= Ahal =

Ahal may refer to:

- Ahal Province, in Turkmenistan
- Ahel, a city in Fars Province, Iran
- Ahal FK, a Turkmen football club
- Ahal, Raebareli, a village in Uttar Pradesh, India
