= Nigohi =

Nigohi may refer to:

- Nigohi, Shahjahanpur, a town in Shahjahanpur District, Uttar Pradesh, India
- Nigohi, Raebareli, a village in Raebareli District, Uttar Pradesh, India
