= Kiya, Raebareli =

Kiya Kia
- Village
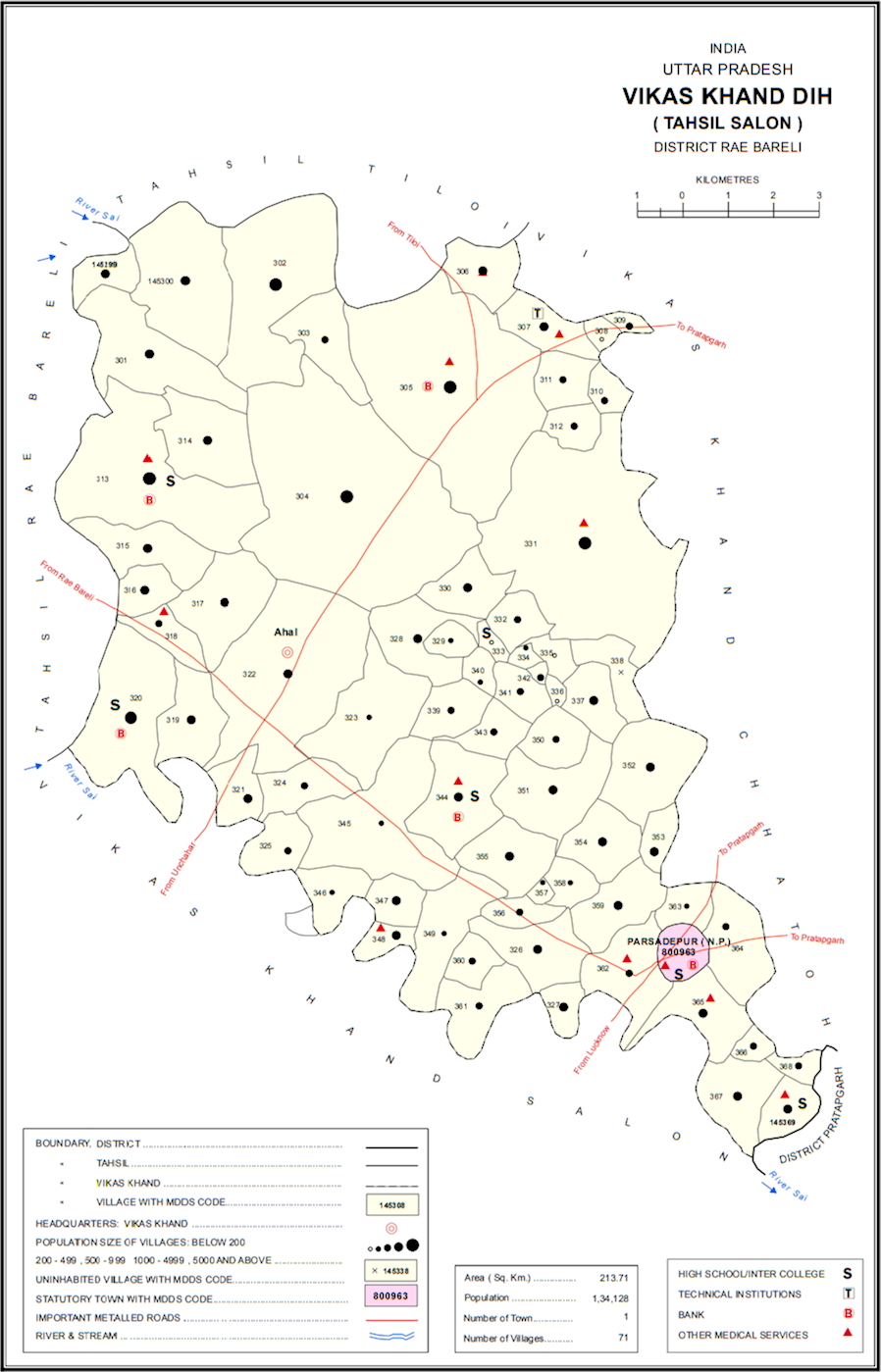
- Map showing Kiya (#310) in Dih CD block

- Location in Uttar Pradesh, India
- Coordinates: 26.193108°N 81.482923°E
- Country: India
- State: Uttar Pradesh
- District: Raebareli

Area
  - Total: 0.928 km^{2} (0.358 sq mi)

Population (2011)
  - Total: 846
  - Density: 912/km^{2} (2,360/sq mi)

Languages
  - Official: Hindi
- Time zone: UTC+5:30 (IST)
- Vehicle registration: UP-35

Kiya is a large village in Dih block of Rae Bareli district, Uttar Pradesh, India. It is located 33 km from Raebareli, the district headquarters. As of 2011, it has a population of 846 people, in 141 households. It has one primary school and no healthcare facilities, and does not host a weekly haat or a permanent market. It belongs to the nyaya panchayat of Mau.

The 1951 census recorded Kiya as comprising 2 hamlets, with a population of 302 people (164 male and 138 female), in 67 households and 67 physical houses. The area of the village was given as 224 acres. 3 residents were literate, all male. The village was listed as belonging to the pargana of Rokha and the thana of Nasirabad.

The 1961 census recorded Kiya as comprising 2 hamlets, with a population of 377 people (191 male and 186 female), in 99 households and 82 physical houses. The area of the village was given as 224 acres.

The 1981 census recorded Kiya as having a population of 470 people, in 157 households, and having an area of 90.65 hectares. The main staple foods were listed as wheat and rice.

The 1991 census recorded Kiya as having a total population of 550 people (301 male and 249 female), in 115 households and 115 physical houses. The area of the village was listed as 107 hectares. Members of the 0-6 age group numbered 103, or 19% of the total; this group was 55% male (57) and 45% female (46). Members of scheduled castes made up 51% of the village's population, while no members of scheduled tribes were recorded. The literacy rate of the village was 20% (88 men and 20 women). 168 people were classified as main workers (all men), while 0 people were classified as marginal workers; the remaining 382 residents were non-workers. The breakdown of main workers by employment category was as follows: 119 cultivators (i.e. people who owned or leased their own land); 49 agricultural labourers (i.e. people who worked someone else's land in return for payment). No workers were engaged in other lines of employment, such as livestock, forestry, fishing, hunting, plantations, orchards, etc., mining, household industry or other manufacturing, processing, etc.
