= Pirhi =

- Village
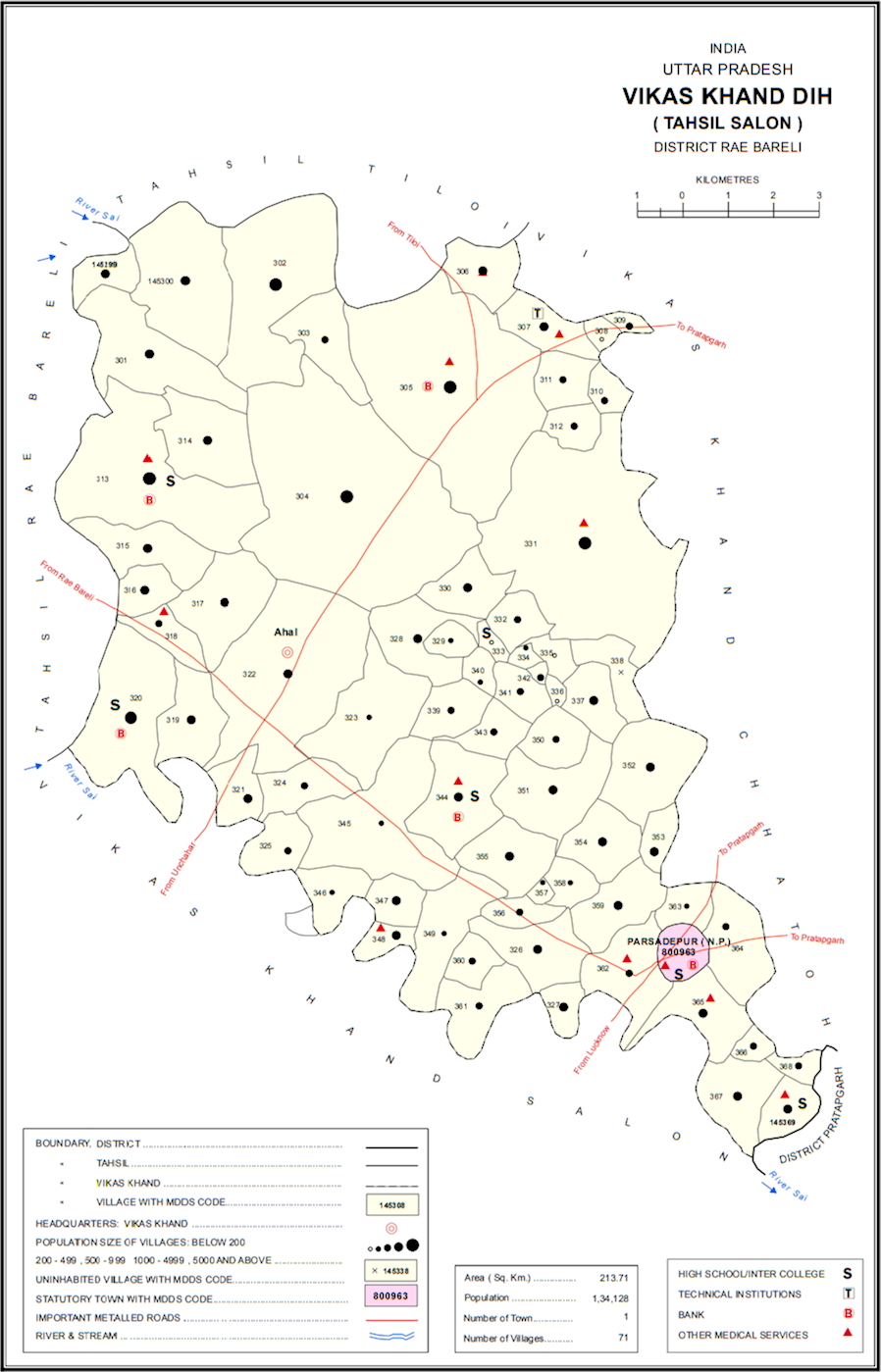
- Map showing Pirhi (#339) in Dih CD block

- Location in Uttar Pradesh, India
- Coordinates: 26.128126°N 81.444042°E
- Country: India
- State: Uttar Pradesh
- District: Raebareli

Area
  - Total: 1.302 km^{2} (0.503 sq mi)

Population (2011)
  - Total: 794
  - Density: 610/km^{2} (1,580/sq mi)

Languages
  - Official: Hindi
- Time zone: UTC+5:30 (IST)
- Vehicle registration: UP-35

Pirhi is a village in Dih block of Rae Bareli district, Uttar Pradesh, India. It is located 21 km from Raebareli, the district headquarters. As of 2011, it has a population of 794 people, in 141 households. It has one primary school and no healthcare facilities, and it does not host a permanent market or a weekly haat. It belongs to the nyaya panchayat of Khetaudhan.

The 1951 census recorded Pirhi as comprising 1 hamlet, with a total population of 356 people (173 male and 183 female), in 73 households and 66 physical houses. The area of the village was given as 322 acres. 19residents were literate, all male. The village was listed as belonging to the pargana of Parshadepur and the thana of Salon.

The 1961 census recorded Pirhi as comprising 2 hamlets, with a total population of 348 people (172 male and 176 female), in 97 households and 97 physical houses. The area of the village was given as 322 acres and it had a post office at that point.

The 1981 census recorded Pirhi as having a population of 302 people, in 103 households. The main staple foods were listed as wheat and rice.

The 1991 census recorded Pirhi as having a total population of 496 people (249 male and 247 female), in 101 households and 101 physical houses. The area of the village was listed as 131 hectares. Members of the 0-6 age group numbered 88, or 18% of the total; this group was 55% male (48) and 45% female (40). Members of scheduled castes made up 29% of the village's population, while no members of scheduled tribes were recorded. The literacy rate of the village was 23% (89 men and 23 women). 148 people were classified as main workers (132 men and 16 women), while 60 people were classified as marginal workers (all women); the remaining 288 residents were non-workers. The breakdown of main workers by employment category was as follows: 105 cultivators (i.e. people who owned or leased their own land); 29 agricultural labourers (i.e. people who worked someone else's land in return for payment); 8 workers in livestock, forestry, fishing, hunting, plantations, orchards, etc.; 0 in mining and quarrying; 1 household industry worker; 0 workers employed in other manufacturing, processing, service, and repair roles; 0 construction workers; 1 employed in trade and commerce; 0 employed in transport, storage, and communications; and 4 in other services.
