= Garwa =

- Village
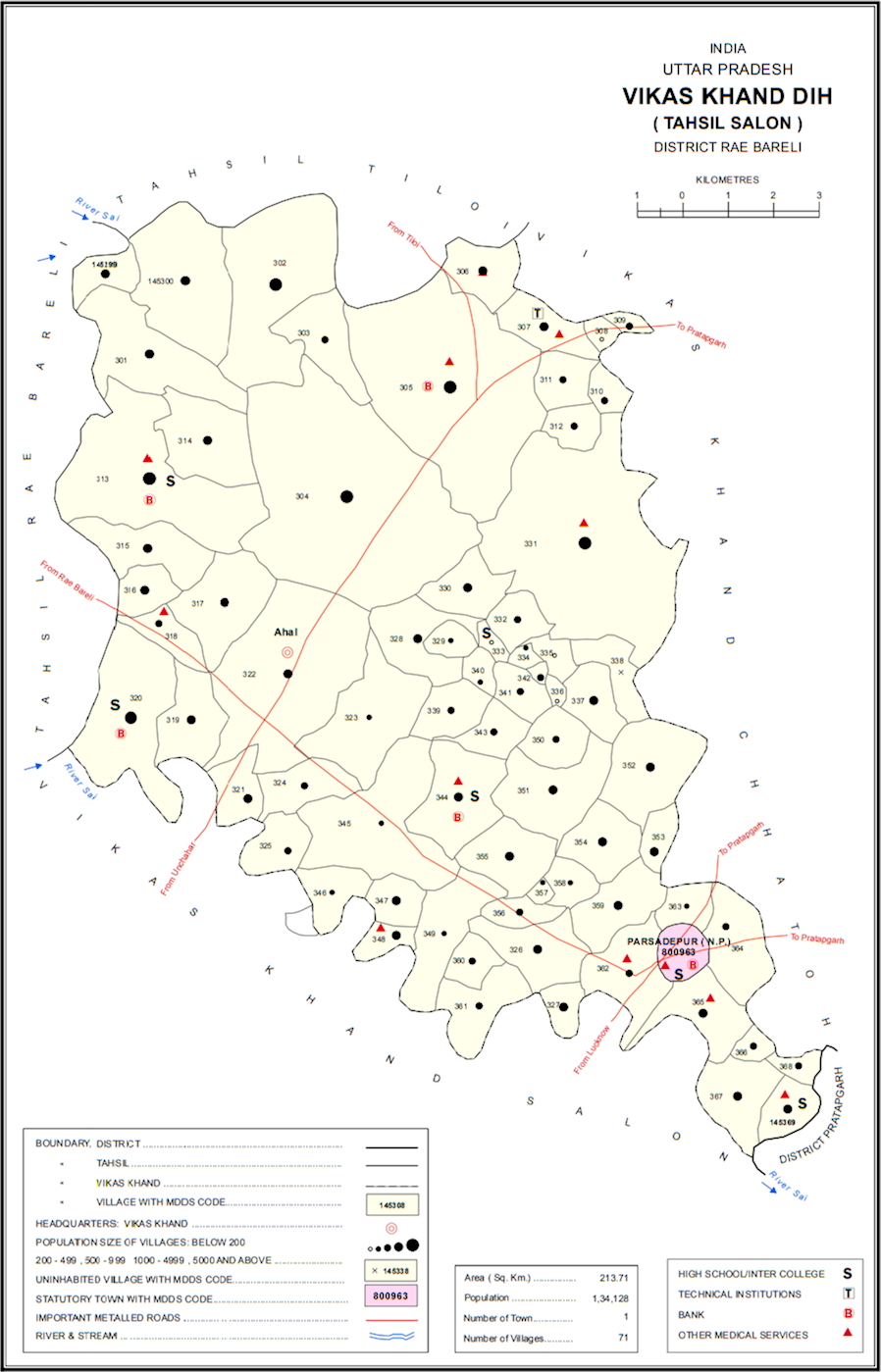
- Map showing Garwa (#316) in Dih CD block

- Location in Uttar Pradesh, India
- Coordinates: 26.157212°N 81.377262°E
- Country: India
- State: Uttar Pradesh
- District: Raebareli

Area
  - Total: 1.50 km^{2} (0.58 sq mi)

Population (2011)
  - Total: 1,485
  - Density: 990/km^{2} (2,560/sq mi)

Languages
  - Official: Hindi
- Time zone: UTC+5:30 (IST)
- Vehicle registration: UP-35

Garwa is a village in Dih block of Rae Bareli district, Uttar Pradesh, India. It is located 18 km from Raebareli, the district headquarters. As of 2011, it has a population of 1,485 people, in 294 households. It has one primary school and no healthcare facilities, and it does not host a permanent market or weekly haat. It belongs to the nyaya panchayat of Tekari Dandu.

The 1951 census recorded Garwa (as "Gadwa") as comprising 4 hamlets, with a total population of 483 people (246 male and 237 female), in 101 households and 85 physical houses. The area of the village was given as 361 acres. 10 residents were literate, all male. The village was listed as belonging to the pargana of Parshadepur and the thana of Nasirabad.

The 1961 census recorded Garwa (as "Gadawa") as comprising 4 hamlets, with a total population of 547 people (274 male and 273 female), in 119 households and 92 physical houses. The area of the village was given as 361 acres.

The 1981 census recorded Garwa (as "Garhwa") as having a population of 653 people, in 164 households, and having an area of 146.10 hectares. The main staple foods were listed as wheat and rice.

The 1991 census recorded Garwa as having a total population of 904 people (474 male and 430 female), in 175 households and 175 physical houses. The area of the village was listed as 149 hectares. Members of the 0-6 age group numbered 236, or 22% of the total; this group was 56% male (109) and 44% female (87). Members of scheduled castes made up 60% of the village's population, while no members of scheduled tribes were recorded. The literacy rate of the village was 18% (149 men and 18 women). 285 people were classified as main workers (244 men and 41 women), while 50 people were classified as marginal workers (all women); the remaining 569 residents were non-workers. The breakdown of main workers by employment category was as follows: 169 cultivators (i.e. people who owned or leased their own land); 80 agricultural labourers (i.e. people who worked someone else's land in return for payment); 0 workers in livestock, forestry, fishing, hunting, plantations, orchards, etc.; 0 in mining and quarrying; 1 household industry worker; 20 workers employed in other manufacturing, processing, service, and repair roles; 0 construction workers; 5 employed in trade and commerce; 0 employed in transport, storage, and communications; and 9 in other services.
