= Kachnawan =

Kachnawan Kachnawān
- Village
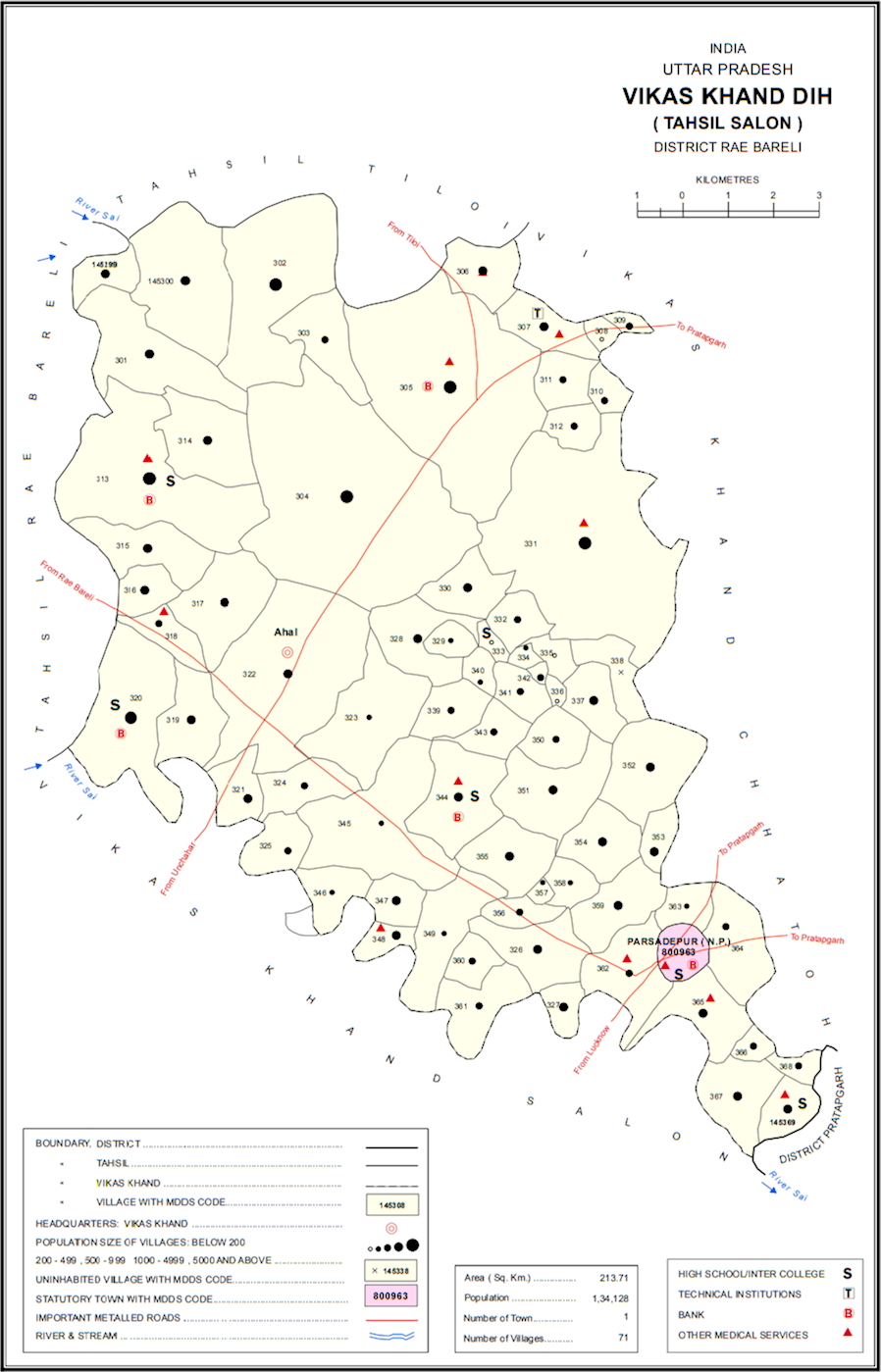
- Map showing Kachnawan (#326) in Dih CD block

- Location in Uttar Pradesh, India
- Coordinates: 26.126779°N 81.375895°E
- Country: India
- State: Uttar Pradesh
- District: Raebareli

Area
  - Total: 3.447 km^{2} (1.331 sq mi)

Population (2011)
  - Total: 3,340
  - Density: 969/km^{2} (2,510/sq mi)

Languages
  - Official: Hindi
- Time zone: UTC+5:30 (IST)
- Vehicle registration: UP-35

Kachnawan is a village in Dih block of Rae Bareli district, Uttar Pradesh, India. It is located 21 km from Raebareli, the district headquarters. As of 2011, it has a population of 3,340 people, in 595 households. It has one primary school and no healthcare facilities, and it does not host a permanent market or weekly haat. It belongs to the nyaya panchayat of Dih.

The 1951 census recorded Kachnawan as comprising 9 hamlets, with a total population of 1,022 people (533 male and 489 female), in 224 households and 119 physical houses. The area of the village was given as 1,509 acres. 61 residents were literate, 59 male and 2 female. The village was listed as belonging to the pargana of Parshadepur and the thana of Nasirabad.

The 1961 census recorded Kachnawan as comprising 7 hamlets, with a total population of 1,181 people (601 male and 590 female), in 343 households and 343 physical houses. The area of the village was given as 1,509 acres.

The 1981 census recorded Kachnawan as having a population of 1,687 people, in 411 households, and having an area of 610.69 hectares. The main staple foods were listed as wheat and rice.

The 1991 census recorded Kachnawan as having a total population of 2,029 people (1,059 male and 970 female), in 396 households and 389 physical houses. The area of the village was listed as 620 hectares. Members of the 0-6 age group numbered 473, or 23% of the total; this group was 45% male (211) and 55% female (262). Members of scheduled castes made up 48% of the village's population, while no members of scheduled tribes were recorded. The literacy rate of the village was 18% (315 men and 54 women). 700 people were classified as main workers (507 men and 193 women), while 111 people were classified as marginal workers (38 men and 73 women); the remaining 1,228 residents were non-workers. The breakdown of main workers by employment category was as follows: 604 cultivators (i.e. people who owned or leased their own land); 36 agricultural labourers (i.e. people who worked someone else's land in return for payment); 2 workers in livestock, forestry, fishing, hunting, plantations, orchards, etc.; 0 in mining and quarrying; 10 household industry workers; 17 workers employed in other manufacturing, processing, service, and repair roles; 2 construction workers; 9 employed in trade and commerce; 3 employed in transport, storage, and communications; and 17 in other services.
