= Bikapur, Raebareli =

Bikapur Bīkapur
- Village
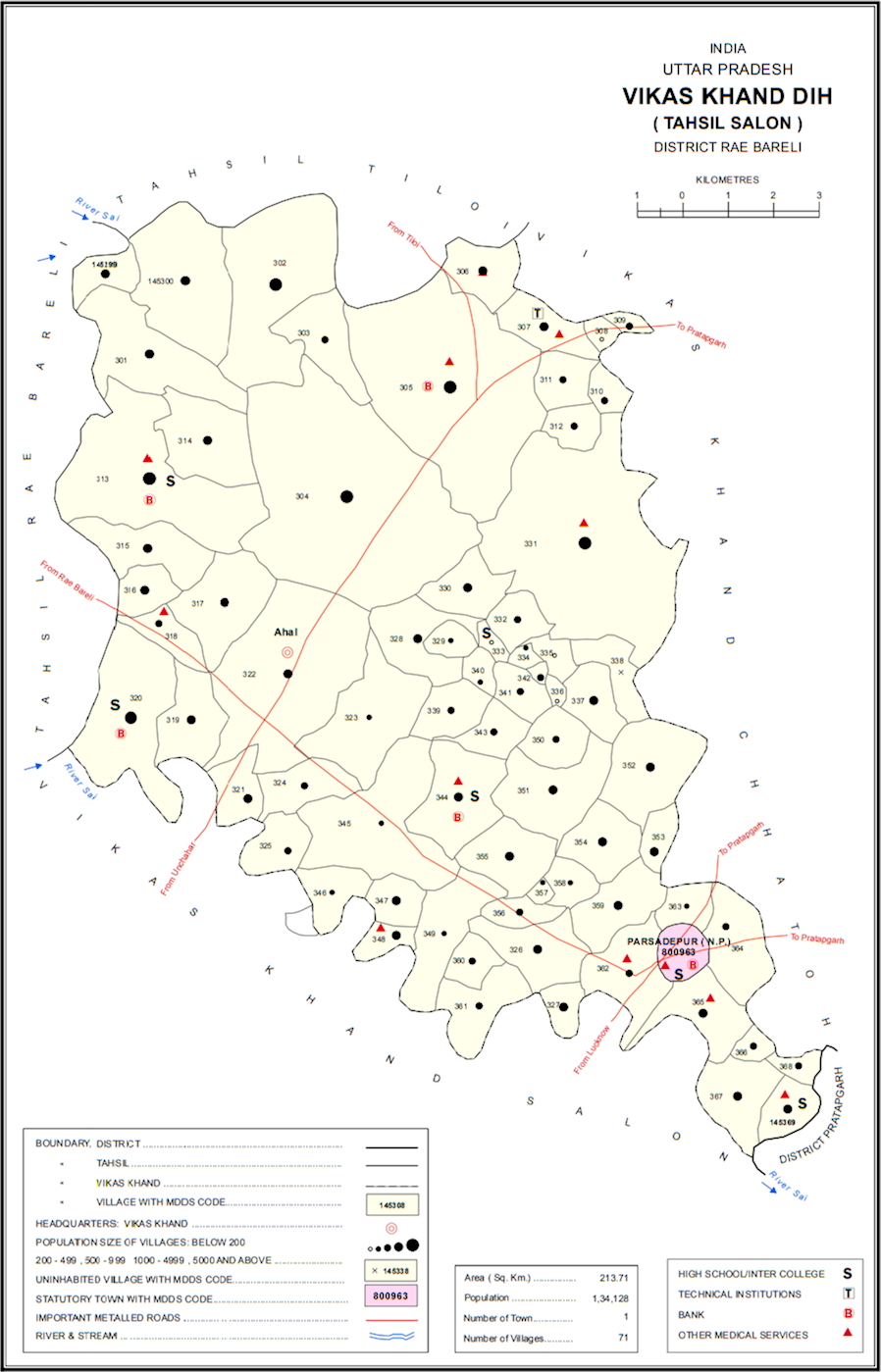
- Map showing Bikapur (#342) in Dih CD block

- Location in Uttar Pradesh, India
- Coordinates: 26.137342°N 81.46994°E
- Country: India
- State: Uttar Pradesh
- District: Raebareli

Area
  - Total: 0.537 km^{2} (0.207 sq mi)

Population (2011)
  - Total: 502
  - Density: 935/km^{2} (2,420/sq mi)

Languages
  - Official: Hindi
- Time zone: UTC+5:30 (IST)
- Vehicle registration: UP-35

Bikapur is a village in Dih block of Rae Bareli district, Uttar Pradesh, India. It is located 27 km from Raebareli, the district headquarters. As of 2011, it has a population of 502 people, in 104 households. It has one primary school and no healthcare facilities, and it does not host a permanent market or a weekly haat. It belongs to the nyaya panchayat of Khetaudhan.

The 1951 census recorded Bikapur as comprising 1 hamlet, with a total population of 204 people (108 male and 96 female), in 44 households and 41 physical houses. The area of the village was given as 131 acres. 1 residents were literate, a male. The village was listed as belonging to the pargana of Rokha and the thana of Nasirabad.

The 1961 census recorded Bikapur as comprising 1 hamlet, with a total population of 199 people (106 male and 99 female), in 42 households and 42 physical houses. The area of the village was given as 131 acres.

The 1981 census recorded Bikapur as having a population of 286 people, in 159 households, and having an area of 53.02 hectares. The main staple foods were listed as wheat and rice.

The 1991 census recorded Bikapur as having a total population of 390 people (206 male and 184 female), in 80 households and 80 physical houses. The area of the village was listed as 54 hectares. Members of the 0-6 age group numbered 92, or 24% of the total; this group was 64% male (59) and 36% female (33). Members of scheduled castes made up 38% of the village's population, while no members of scheduled tribes were recorded. The literacy rate of the village was 14% (53 men and 3 women). 158 people were classified as main workers (91 men and 67 women), while 1 person was classified as a marginal worker (a woman); the remaining 231 residents were non-workers. The breakdown of main workers by employment category was as follows: 146 cultivators (i.e. people who owned or leased their own land); 9 agricultural labourers (i.e. people who worked someone else's land in return for payment); 0 workers in livestock, forestry, fishing, hunting, plantations, orchards, etc.; 0 in mining and quarrying; 0 household industry workers; 0 workers employed in other manufacturing, processing, service, and repair roles; 0 construction workers; 0 employed in trade and commerce; 0 employed in transport, storage, and communications; and 3 in other services.
