= Thauri =

- Village
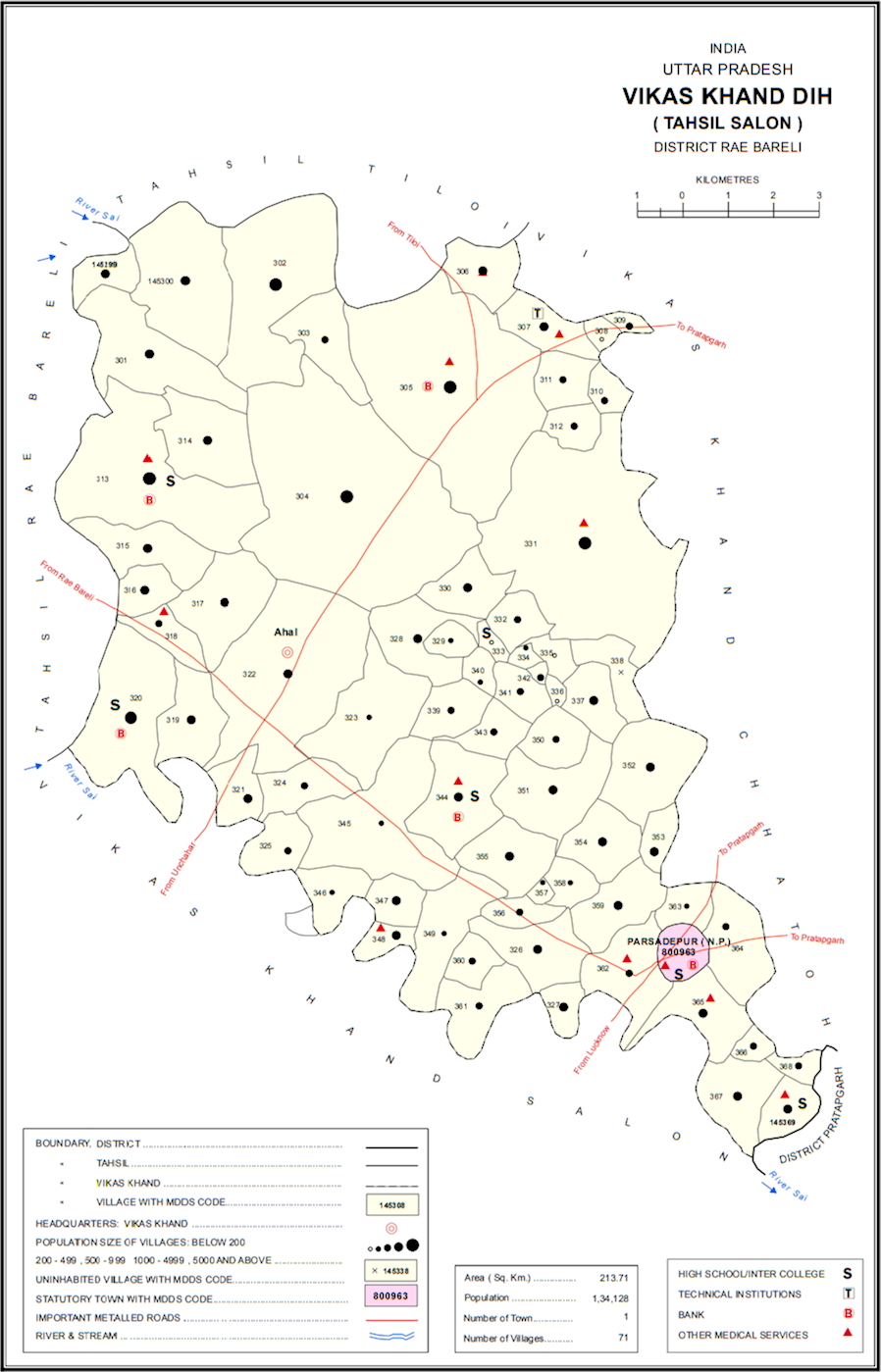
- Map showing Thauri (#307) in Dih CD block

- Location in Uttar Pradesh, India
- Coordinates: 26.209511°N 81.472258°E
- Country India: India
- State: Uttar Pradesh
- District: Raebareli

Area
  - Total: 1.637 km^{2} (0.632 sq mi)

Population (2011)
  - Total: 1,225
  - Density: 748.3/km^{2} (1,938/sq mi)

Languages
  - Official: Hindi
- Time zone: UTC+5:30 (IST)
- Vehicle registration: UP-35

Thauri is a village in Dih block of Rae Bareli district, Uttar Pradesh, India. It is located 24 km from Raebareli, the district headquarters. As of 2011, it has a population of 1,225 people, in 234 households. It has one primary school and one healthcare facility. It belongs to the nyaya panchayat of Mau.

The 1951 census recorded Thauri as comprising 4 hamlets, with a total population of 355 people (180 male and 175 female), in 78 households and 73 physical houses. The area of the village was given as 435 acres. 2 residents were literate, both male. The village was listed as belonging to the pargana of Rokha and the thana of Nasirabad.

The 1961 census recorded Thauri as comprising 5 hamlets, with a total population of 434 people (212 male and 222 female), in 94 households and 93 physical houses. The area of the village was given as 435 acres.

The 1981 census recorded Thauri as having a population of 583 people, in 140 households, and having an area of 164.30 hectares. The main staple foods were given as wheat and rice.

The 1991 census recorded Thauri as having a total population of 754 people (388 male and 366 female), in 161 households and 161 physical houses. The area of the village was listed as 165 hectares. Members of the 0-6 age group numbered 149, or 20% of the total; this group was 47% male (70) and 53% female (79). Members of scheduled castes made up 77% of the village's population, while no members of scheduled tribes were recorded. The literacy rate of the village was 18% (125 men and 11 women). 222 people were classified as main workers (all men), while 26 people were classified as marginal workers (2 men and 24 women); the remaining 506 residents were non-workers. The breakdown of main workers by employment category was as follows: 162 cultivators (i.e. people who owned or leased their own land); 51 agricultural labourers (i.e. people who worked someone else's land in return for payment); 0 workers in livestock, forestry, fishing, hunting, plantations, orchards, etc.; 0 in mining and quarrying; 0 household industry workers; 1 worker employed in other manufacturing, processing, service, and repair roles; 1 construction worker; 1 employed in trade and commerce; 0 employed in transport, storage, and communications; and 6 in other services.
