= Hajipur, Dih, Raebareli =

Hajipur Hājipur
- Village
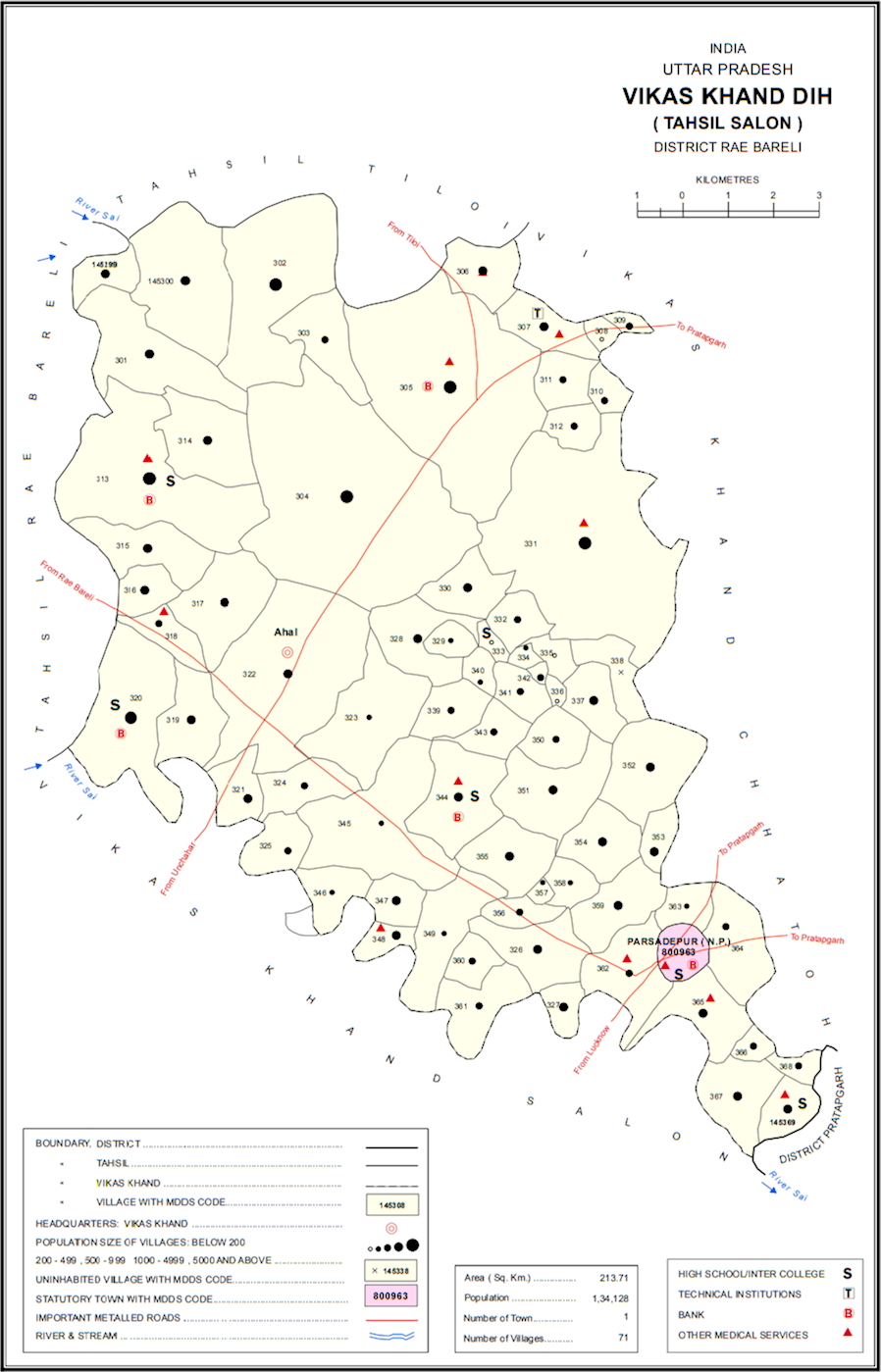
- Map showing Hajipur (#367) in Dih CD block

- Location in Uttar Pradesh, India
- Coordinates: 26.049842°N 81.507116°E
- Country India: India
- State: Uttar Pradesh
- District: Raebareli

Area
  - Total: 2.184 km^{2} (0.843 sq mi)

Population (2011)
  - Total: 1,387
  - Density: 635.1/km^{2} (1,645/sq mi)

Languages
  - Official: Hindi
- Time zone: UTC+5:30 (IST)
- Vehicle registration: UP-35

Hajipur is a village in Dih block of Rae Bareli district, Uttar Pradesh, India. It is located 37 km from Raebareli, the district headquarters. As of 2011, it has a population of 1,387 people, in 246 households. It has one primary school and no healthcare facilities. It belongs to the nyaya panchayat of Ahora Rampur.

The 1951 census recorded Hajipur as comprising 8 hamlets, with a total population of 513 people (252 male and 261 female), in 111 households and 97 physical houses. The area of the village was given as 558 acres. 25 residents were literate, 19 male and 6 female. The village was listed as belonging to the pargana of Parshadepur and the thana of Salon.

The 1961 census recorded Hajipur as comprising 8 hamlets, with a total population of 579 people (285 male and 294 female), in 123 households and 118 physical houses. The area of the village was given as 558 acres.

The 1981 census recorded Hajipur as having a population of 744 people, in 150 households, and having an area of 218.53 hectares. The main staple foods were given as wheat and bajra.

The 1991 census recorded Hajipur as having a total population of 877 people (443 male and 434 female), in 177 households and 177 physical houses. The area of the village was listed as 219 hectares. Members of the 0-6 age group numbered 195, or 22% of the total; this group was 50% male (97) and 50% female (98). Members of scheduled castes made up 16% of the village's population, while no members of scheduled tribes were recorded. The literacy rate of the village was 32% (216 men and 64 women). 231 people were classified as main workers (199 men and 32 women), while 80 people were classified as marginal workers (1 man and 79 women); the remaining 566 residents were non-workers. The breakdown of main workers by employment category was as follows: 198 cultivators (i.e. people who owned or leased their own land); 7 agricultural labourers (i.e. people who worked someone else's land in return for payment); 2 workers in livestock, forestry, fishing, hunting, plantations, orchards, etc.; 0 in mining and quarrying; 4 household industry workers; 6 workers employed in other manufacturing, processing, service, and repair roles; 0 construction workers; 0 employed in trade and commerce; 1 employed in transport, storage, and communications; and 13 in other services.
