= Dela, Raebareli =

Dela
- Village
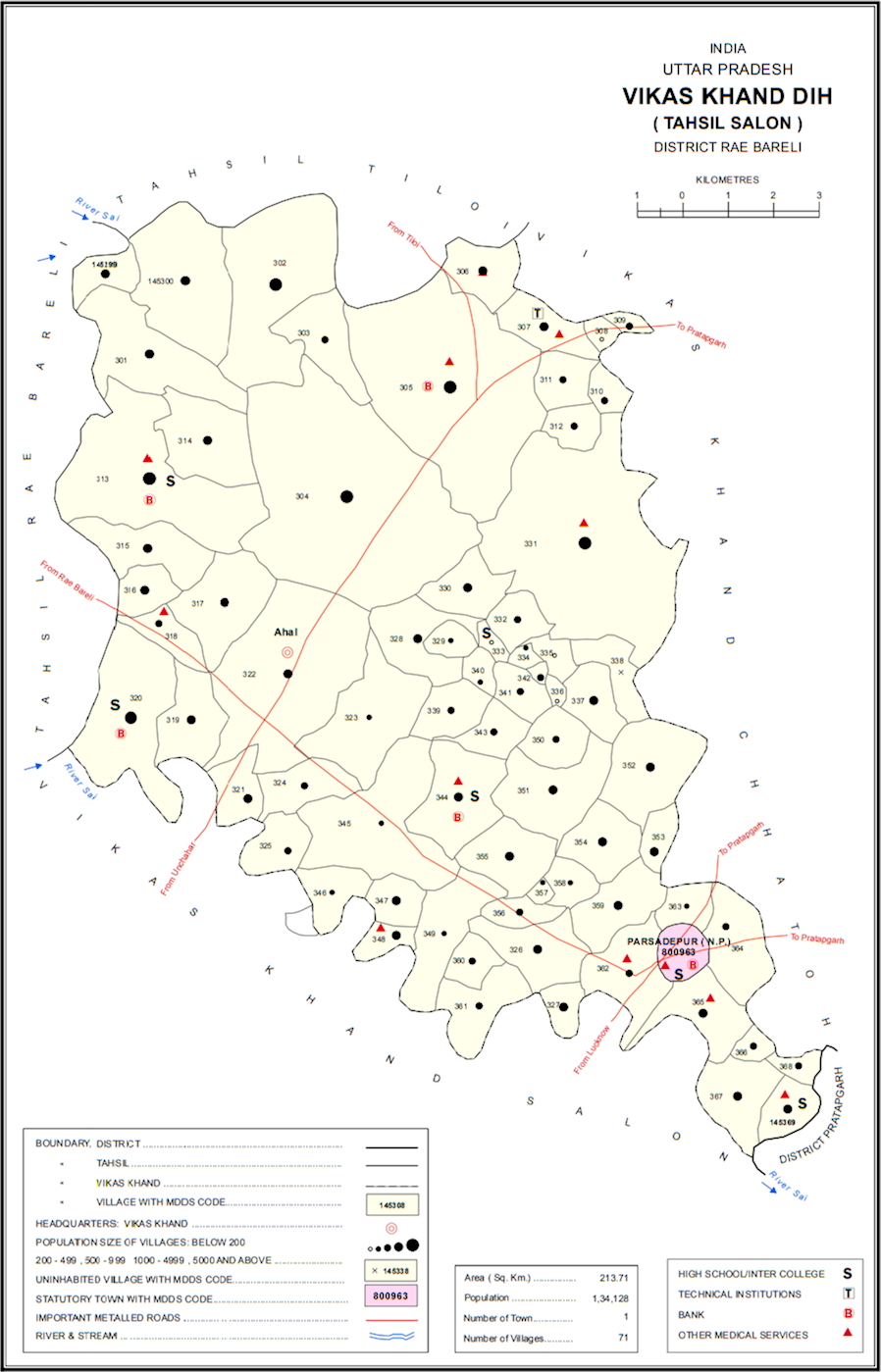
- Map showing Dela (#317) in Dih CD block

- Location in Uttar Pradesh, India
- Coordinates: 26.144673°N 81.399903°E
- Country: India
- State: Uttar Pradesh
- District: Raebareli

Area
  - Total: 3.92 km^{2} (1.51 sq mi)

Population (2011)
  - Total: 2,803
  - Density: 715/km^{2} (1,850/sq mi)

Languages
  - Official: Hindi
- Time zone: UTC+5:30 (IST)
- Vehicle registration: UP-35

Dela is a village in Dih block of Rae Bareli district, Uttar Pradesh, India. It is located 19 km from Raebareli, the district headquarters. As of 2011, it has a population of 2,803 people, in 548 households. It has two primary schools and no healthcare facilities. It belongs to the nyaya panchayat of Tekari Dandu.

The 1951 census recorded Dela as comprising 10 hamlets, with a total population of 1,070 people (567 male and 503 female), in 238 households and 205 physical houses. The area of the village was given as 927 acres. 89 residents were literate, 86 male and 3 female. The village was listed as belonging to the pargana of Parshadepur and the thana of Nasirabad.

The 1961 census recorded Dela as comprising 6 hamlets, with a total population of 1,224 people (639 male and 585 female), in 253 households and 238 physical houses. The area of the village was given as 927 acres.

The 1981 census recorded Dela as having a population of 1,715 people, in 369 households, and having an area of 391.74 hectares. The main staple foods were given as wheat and juwar.

The 1991 census recorded Dela as having a total population of 1,889 people (1,003 male and 886 female), in 369 households and 369 physical houses. The area of the village was listed as 339 hectares. Members of the 0-6 age group numbered 356, or 19% of the total; this group was 52% male (184) and 48% female (172). Members of scheduled castes made up 28% of the village's population, while no members of scheduled tribes were recorded. The literacy rate of the village was 31% (455 men and 127 women). 587 people were classified as main workers (513 men and 74 women), while 13 people were classified as marginal workers (all women); the remaining 1,289 residents were non-workers. The breakdown of main workers by employment category was as follows: 360 cultivators (i.e. people who owned or leased their own land); 140 agricultural labourers (i.e. people who worked someone else's land in return for payment); 0 workers in livestock, forestry, fishing, hunting, plantations, orchards, etc.; 0 in mining and quarrying; 6 household industry workers; 6 workers employed in other manufacturing, processing, service, and repair roles; 2 construction workers; 31 employed in trade and commerce; 1 employed in transport, storage, and communications; and 41 in other services.
