= Rashidpur, Raebareli =

Rashidpur Rashīdpur
- Village
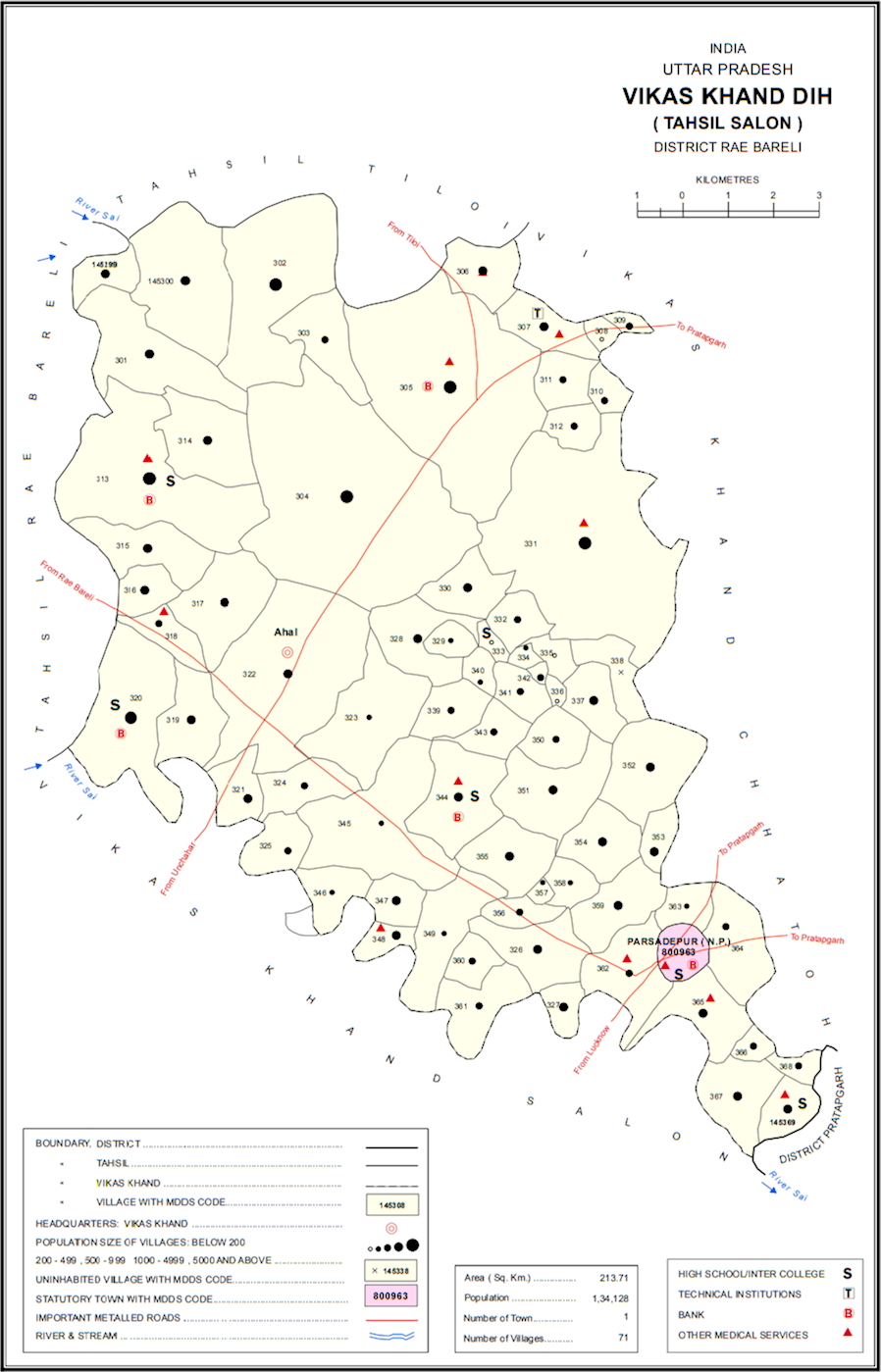
- Map showing Rashidpur (#351) in Dih CD block

- Location in Uttar Pradesh, India
- Coordinates: 26.112521°N 81.473674°E
- Country: India
- State: Uttar Pradesh
- District: Raebareli

Area
  - Total: 9.115 km^{2} (3.519 sq mi)

Population (2011)
  - Total: 1,633
  - Density: 179.2/km^{2} (464.0/sq mi)

Languages
  - Official: Hindi
- Time zone: UTC+5:30 (IST)
- PIN: 229129
- Vehicle registration: UP-35

Rashidpur is a village in Dih block of Rae Bareli district, Uttar Pradesh, India. It is located 28 km from Raebareli, the district headquarters. As of 2011, it has a population of 1,633 people, in 300 households. It has one primary school and no healthcare facilities, as well as a sub post office, and it does not host a permanent market or a weekly haat. It belongs to the nyaya panchayat of Atawan.

The 1951 census recorded Rashidpur as comprising 3 hamlets, with a total population of 785 people (385 male and 400 female), in 155 households and 150 physical houses. The area of the village was given as 823 acres. 42 residents were literate, all male. The village was listed as belonging to the pargana of Parshadepur and the thana of Salon.

The 1961 census recorded Rashidpur as comprising 3 hamlets, with a total population of 772 people (348 male and 424 female), in 162 households and 158 physical houses. The area of the village was given as 823 acres.

The 1981 census recorded Rashidpur as having a population of 963 people, in 97 households, and having an area of 384.45 hectares. The main staple foods were listed as wheat and rice.

The 1991 census recorded Rashidpur (as "Rasidpur") as having a total population of 1,089 people (597 male and 492 female), in 211 households and 211 physical houses. The area of the village was listed as 336 hectares. Members of the 0-6 age group numbered 178, or 16% of the total; this group was 61% male (108) and 39% female (70). Members of scheduled castes made up 26% of the village's population, while no members of scheduled tribes were recorded. The literacy rate of the village was 26% (224 men and 61 women). 413 people were classified as main workers (318 men and 95 women), while 1 person were classified as marginal workers (a woman); the remaining 675 residents were non-workers. The breakdown of main workers by employment category was as follows: 297 cultivators (i.e. people who owned or leased their own land); 105 agricultural labourers (i.e. people who worked someone else's land in return for payment); 1 worker in livestock, forestry, fishing, hunting, plantations, orchards, etc.; 0 in mining and quarrying; 1 household industry worker; 0 workers employed in other manufacturing, processing, service, and repair roles; 0 construction workers; 1 employed in trade and commerce; 0 employed in transport, storage, and communications; and 8 in other services.
