= Parsadepur =

Parsadepur Parshadepur
- Town
- Nickname: Bhagwan Parashuram ki Taposthali
- Location in Uttar Pradesh, India
- Coordinates: 26°04′55″N 81°30′20″E
- Country: India
- State: Uttar Pradesh
- District: Rae Bareli

Area
  - Total: 6 km^{2} (2.3 sq mi)

Population (2011)
  - Total: 11,853
  - Density: 2,000/km^{2} (5,100/sq mi)

Languages
  - Official: Hindi, Urdu
  - Regional: Awadhi (Baiswari dialect)
- Time zone: UTC+5:30 (IST)
- PIN: 229129
- Vehicle registration: UP-33
- Website: https://raebareli.nic.in/public-utility/nagar-panchayat-parsadepur/

Parsadepur, also spelled Parshadepur, is a town and a nagar panchayat in Rae Bareli district in the Indian state of Uttar Pradesh. It is located on the north bank of the Sai river, at the crossroads between the road from Salon to Jais and the smaller road from Raebareli to Ateha. Historically noted for its large weaving industry, Parsadepur served as the headquarters of a pargana since the late 18th century. As of 2011, its population is 11,853 people, in 1,738 households.

Parsadepur has a mixed population of Hindus and Muslims. There is an ancient temple known as "midhurin mata" dedicated to Durga maa of Hindu tradition. There is also a beautiful garden and park on the banks of the Sai river nearby. Ansar Chowk is located within Parsadepur. Currently, no railway station is located in Parsadepur. It comes within the jurisdiction of Deeh police station, and under the administrative jurisdiction of the Lucknow bench of the High Court of Judicature at Allahabad.

Parshadepur hosts two different markets. The smaller one is held on Mondays and Fridays and the larger one is held on Tuesdays and Saturdays. At both markets, vendors mostly sell items like cloth, grain, gur, ornaments, and vegetables.

Parsadepur has the following wards: Poore Kazi Paschimi, Poore Kazi Poorvi, Zilla, Zuma Maszid, Kaziana, Garhi, Katra Bazar, Shuklana, and Ram Sagar. It is located 30km from Raebareli, the district headquarters, and 7km from Salon, the tehsil headquarters. It does not have its own fire department and is instead covered by the fire department in Salon.

== History ==
Parshadepur originated as an agglomeration of four villages: Ahora Rampur, Sunsari, Sunga, and Phagupur. According to legend, it was founded by a Bhar named Pars, but this is likely spurious. Around 1783, it was granted as a jagir to Bahu Begum, under whom it became the seat of a pargana. Under the Nawabs of Awadh, Parshadepur was the site of a British military station, which was abandoned during the Indian Rebellion of 1857 and later destroyed by the Kanhpurias of Nain.

At the turn of the 20th century, Parshadepur was described as having "a large number of weavers", as well as a post office, an upper primary school, and two bazars: one in Sunsari called Sheoganj and one in Sunga called Qazi-ka-Bazar. The four constituent villages of Parshadepur were held by different zamindars: Ahora Rampur by Gautam Rajputs and Brahmans, Sunsari and part of Phagupur by the Gautams, and Sunga and the rest of Phagupur by Sayyids and Pathans. The population as of 1901 was 3,260 people, including 1,685 Muslims.

== Demographics ==
Historical population
Year	Pop.	±%
1991	7,191	—
2001	9,739	+35.4%
2011	11,853	+21.7%
Source: 2011 Census of India

As of the 2001 Census of India, Parsadepur had a population of 9,614. Males constitute 51% of the population and females 49%. Parsadepur has an average literacy rate of 47%, lower than the national average of 59.5%: male literacy is 56%, and female literacy is 37%. In Parsadepur, 18% of the population is under 6 years of age.

According to the 2011 census, Parsadepur has a population of 11,853 people, in 1,738 households. The town's sex ratio is 965 females to every 1000 males; 6,033 of Parsadepur's residents are male (50.9%) and 5,820 are female (49.1%). The 0–6 age group makes up about 15.1% of the town's population; the sex ratio for this group is 938, which is higher than the district urban average for this group. Members of Scheduled Castes make up 18.98% of the town's population, while members of Scheduled Tribes make up 0.45%. Parsadepur's literacy rate was 65.8% (counting only people age 7 and up); literacy was higher among men and boys (73.59%) than among women and girls (57.77%). The scheduled castes literacy rate is 48.33% (58.52% among men and boys, and 37.51% among women and girls), which is the lowest value for towns in Raebareli district.

In terms of employment, 21.31% of Parsadepur residents were classified as main workers (i.e. people employed for at least 6 months per year) in 2011. Marginal workers (i.e. people employed for less than 6 months per year) made up 9.90%, and the remaining 68.79% were non-workers. Employment status varied significantly according to gender, with 47.90% of men being either main or marginal workers, compared to only 13.90% of women.

40.07% of Parsadepur residents live in slum conditions as of 2011. There are 4 slum areas in Parsadepur: Ram Sagar, Pure Qazi West, Qaziyana, and Pure Qazi East (the largest). These range in size from about 168 to 195 households and have between 16 and 46 tap water access points. The number of toilets installed in people's homes ranges from 1 in Qaziyana to 3 in Pure Qazi East. All 6 areas are serviced by open sewers, as is the rest of the city.
