= Sadipur Kotwa =

Sadipur Kotwa Sādipur Kotwa
- Village
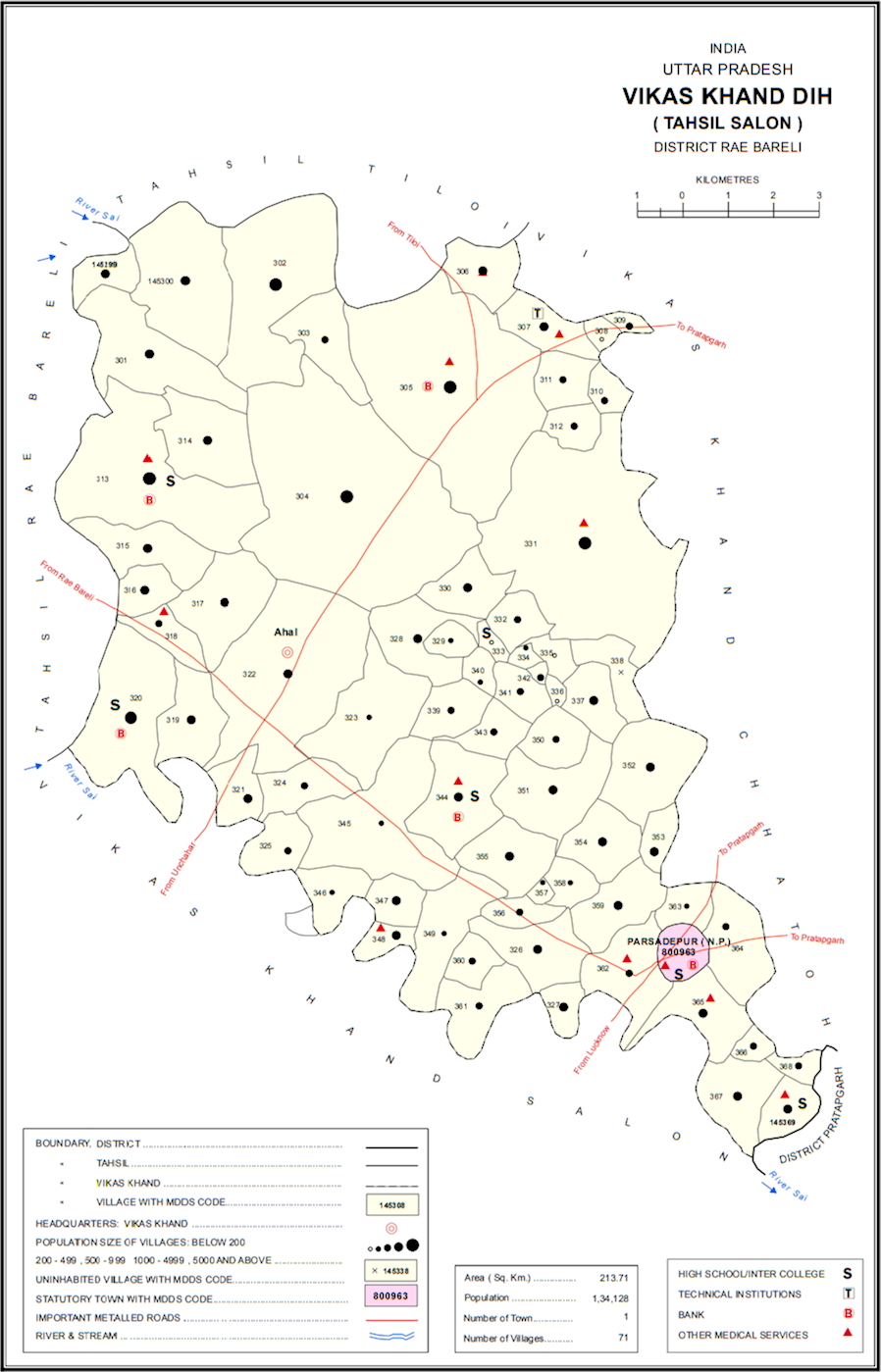
- Map showing Sadipur Kotwa (#327) in Dih CD block

- Location in Uttar Pradesh, India
- Coordinates: 26.126084°N 81.384388°E
- Country: India
- State: Uttar Pradesh
- District: Raebareli

Area
  - Total: 1.734 km^{2} (0.670 sq mi)

Population (2011)
  - Total: 1,850
  - Density: 1,070/km^{2} (2,760/sq mi)

Languages
  - Official: Hindi
- Time zone: UTC+5:30 (IST)
- Vehicle registration: UP-35

Sadipur Kotwa is a village in Dih block of Rae Bareli district, Uttar Pradesh, India. It is located 20 km from Raebareli, the district headquarters. As of 2011, it has a population of 1,850 people, in 320 households. It has one primary school and no healthcare facilities, and it does not host a permanent market or weekly haat. It belongs to the nyaya panchayat of Dih.

The 1951 census recorded Sadipur Kotwa as comprising 5 hamlets, with a total population of 600 people (312 male and 288 female), in 120 households and 110 physical houses. The area of the village was given as 559 acres. 17 residents were literate, 16 male and 1 female. The village was listed as belonging to the pargana of Parshadepur and the thana of Nasirabad.

The 1961 census recorded Sadipur Kotwa as comprising 4 hamlets, with a total population of 638 people (337 male and 301 female), in 130 households and 122 physical houses. The area of the village was given as 559 acres.

The 1981 census recorded Sadipur Kotwa as having a population of 904 people, in 241 households, and having an area of 234.32 hectares. The main staple foods were listed as wheat and rice.

The 1991 census recorded Sadipur Kotwa as having a total population of 1,054 people (549 male and 505 female), in 211 households and 209 physical houses. The area of the village was listed as 234 hectares. Members of the 0-6 age group numbered 179, or 17% of the total; this group was 50% male (90) and 50% female (89). Members of scheduled castes made up 22% of the village's population, while no members of scheduled tribes were recorded. The literacy rate of the village was 18% (173 men and 18 women). 323 people were classified as main workers (300 men and 23 women), while 0 people were classified as marginal workers; the remaining 731 residents were non-workers. The breakdown of main workers by employment category was as follows: 303 cultivators (i.e. people who owned or leased their own land); 6 agricultural labourers (i.e. people who worked someone else's land in return for payment); 0 workers in livestock, forestry, fishing, hunting, plantations, orchards, etc.; 0 in mining and quarrying; 1 household industry worker; 1 worker employed in other manufacturing, processing, service, and repair roles; 0 construction workers; 3 employed in trade and commerce; 1 employed in transport, storage, and communications; and 8 in other services.
