= Hamiri Patti =

- Village
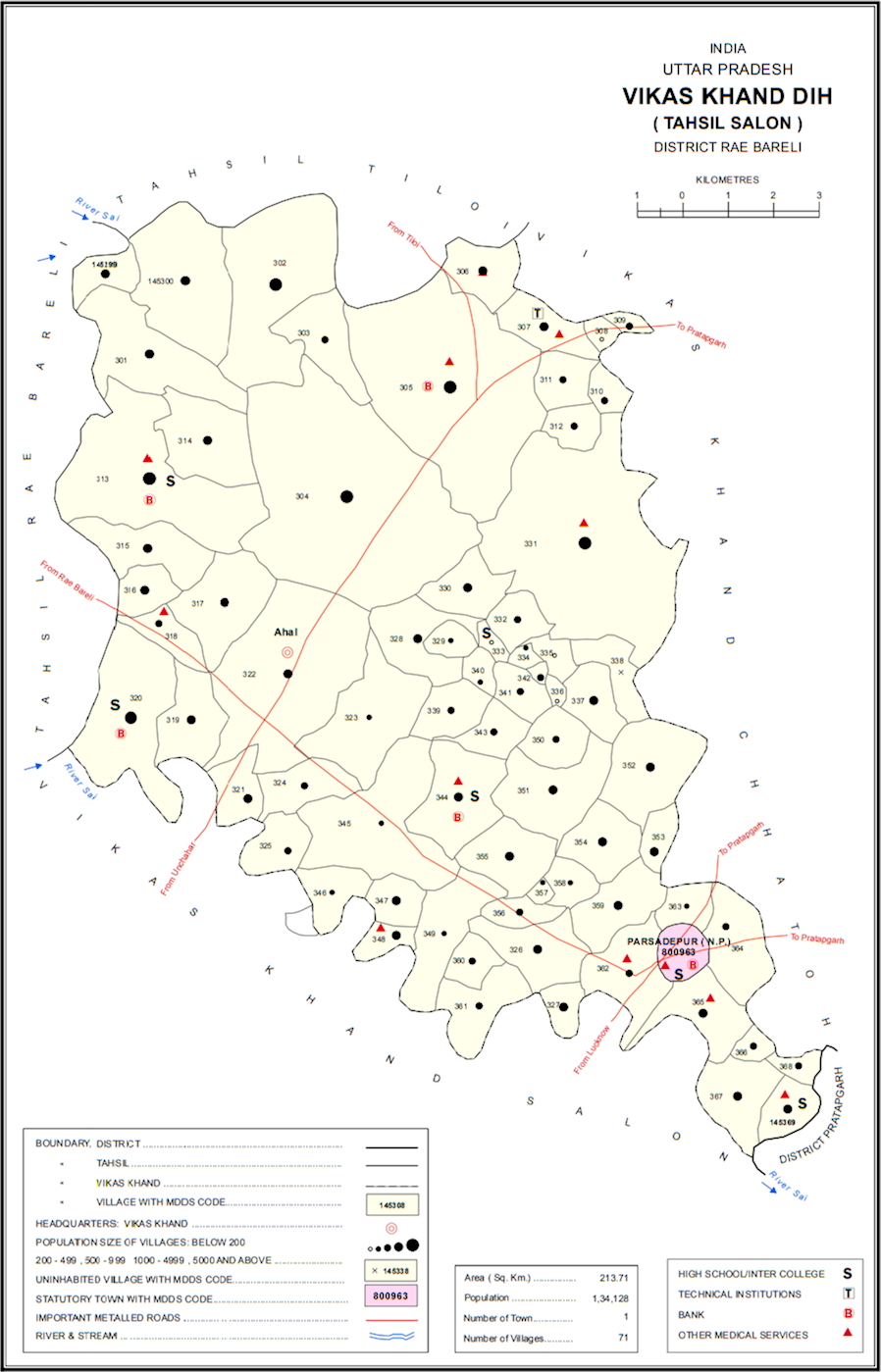
- Map showing Hamiri Patti (#329) in Dih CD block

- Location in Uttar Pradesh, India
- Coordinates: 26.142573°N 81.453311°E
- Country: India
- State: Uttar Pradesh
- District: Raebareli

Area
  - Total: 0.496 km^{2} (0.192 sq mi)

Population (2011)
  - Total: 242
  - Density: 488/km^{2} (1,260/sq mi)

Languages
  - Official: Hindi
- Time zone: UTC+5:30 (IST)
- Vehicle registration: UP-35

Hamiri Patti is a village in Dih block of Rae Bareli district, Uttar Pradesh, India. It is located 25 km from Raebareli, the district headquarters. As of 2011, it has a population of 242 people, in 56 households. It has no schools and no healthcare facilities, and it does not host a permanent market or a weekly haat. It belongs to the nyaya panchayat of Birnawan.

The 1951 census recorded Hamiri Patti (as "Hamiripatti") as comprising 1 hamlet, with a total population of 108 people (59 male and 49 female), in 26 households and 25 physical houses. The area of the village was given as 107 acres. 4 residents were literate, all male. The village was listed as belonging to the pargana of Rokha and the thana of Nasirabad.

The 1961 census recorded Hamiri Patti as comprising 1 hamlet, with a total population of 227 people (115 male and 112 female), in 54 households and 54 physical houses. The area of the village was given as 107 acres.

The 1981 census recorded Hamiri Patti as having a population of 133 people, in 31 households, and having an area of 43.30 hectares. The main staple foods were listed as wheat and rice.

The 1991 census recorded Hamiri Patti as having a total population of 376 people (194 male and 182 female), in 64 households and 64 physical houses. The area of the village was listed as 50 hectares. Members of the 0-6 age group numbered 93, or 25% of the total; this group was 48% male (45) and 52% female (48). Members of scheduled castes made up 7% of the village's population, while no members of scheduled tribes were recorded. The literacy rate of the village was 15% (55 men and 0 women). 108 people were classified as main workers (all men), while 79 people were classified as marginal workers (all women); the remaining 189 residents were non-workers. The breakdown of main workers by employment category was as follows: 103 cultivators (i.e. people who owned or leased their own land); 5 agricultural labourers (i.e. people who worked someone else's land in return for payment); 0 workers in livestock, forestry, fishing, hunting, plantations, orchards, etc.; 0 in mining and quarrying; 0 household industry workers; 0 workers employed in other manufacturing, processing, service, and repair roles; 0 construction workers; 0 employed in trade and commerce; 0 employed in transport, storage, and communications; and 0 in other services.
