= Jagdishpur, Dih, Raebareli =

Jagdishpur
- Village
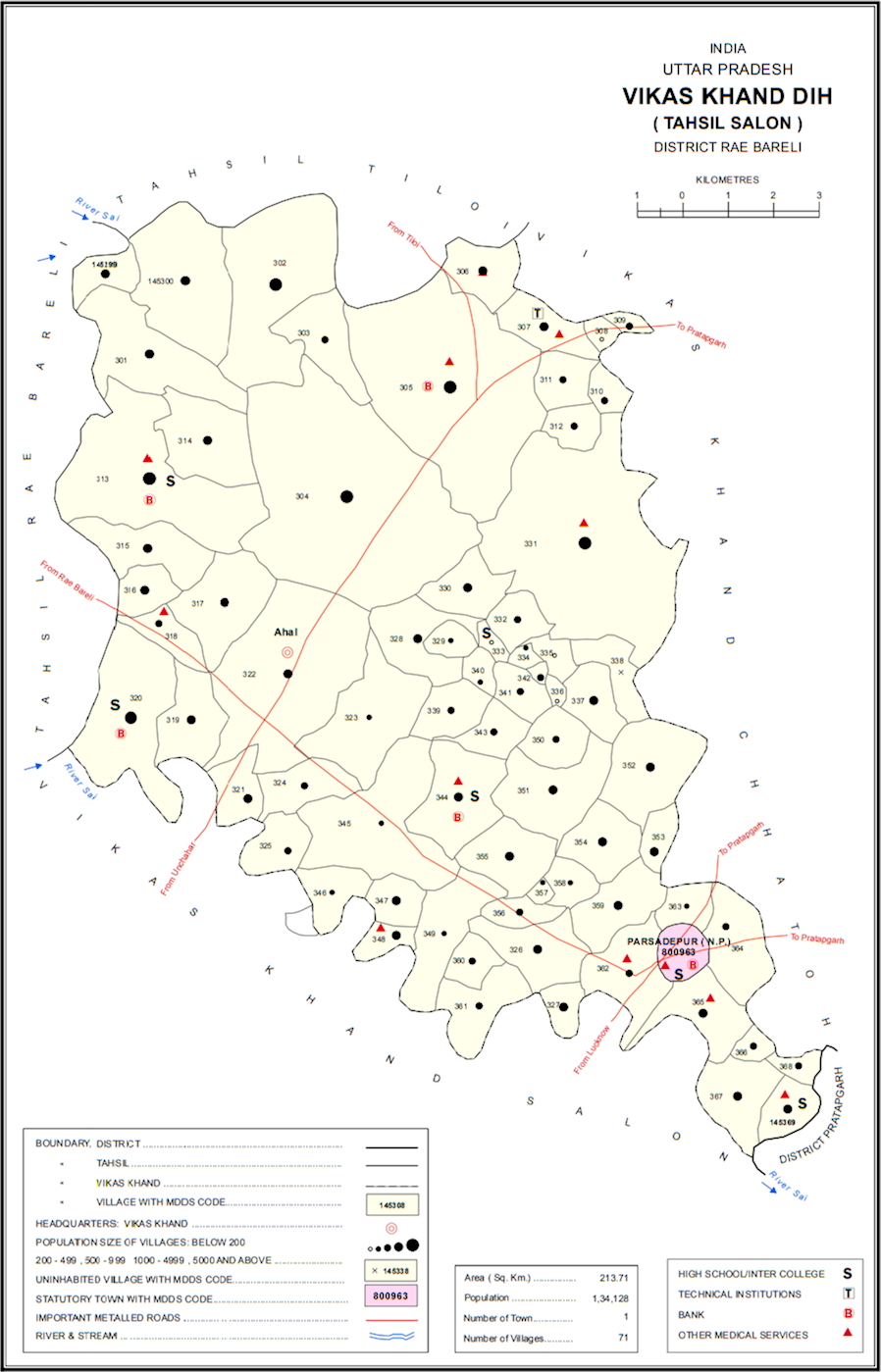
- Map showing Jagdishpur (#319) in Dih CD block

- Location in Uttar Pradesh, India
- Coordinates: 26.13221°N 81.437585°E
- Country: India
- State: Uttar Pradesh
- District: Raebareli

Area
  - Total: 5.514 km^{2} (2.129 sq mi)

Population (2011)
  - Total: 4,538
  - Density: 823.0/km^{2} (2,132/sq mi)

Languages
  - Official: Hindi
- Time zone: UTC+5:30 (IST)
- Vehicle registration: UP-35

Jagdishpur is a village in Dih block of Rae Bareli district, Uttar Pradesh, India. It is located 21 km from Raebareli, the district headquarters. As of 2011, it has a population of 4,538 people, in 840 households. It belongs to the nyaya panchayat of Dih.

The 1951 census recorded Jagdishpur as comprising 22 hamlets, with a total population of 1,797 people (908 male and 889 female), in 428 households and 385 physical houses. The area of the village was given as 1,317 acres. 81 residents were literate, 74 male and 7 female. The village was listed as belonging to the pargana of Parshadepur and the thana of Nasirabad.

The 1961 census recorded Jagdishpur as comprising 18 hamlets, with a total population of 1,743 people (930 male and 813 female), in 449 households and 439 physical houses. The area of the village was given as 1,317 acres.

The 1981 census recorded Jagdishpur as having a population of 2,788 people, in 716 households, and having an area of 554.84 hectares. The main staple foods were listed as wheat and rice.

The 1991 census recorded Jagdishpur as having a total population of 3,203 people (1,695 male and 1,508 female), in 638 households and 633 physical houses. The area of the village was listed as 555 hectares. Members of the 0-6 age group numbered 611, or 19% of the total; this group was 54% male (327) and 46% female (284). Members of scheduled castes made up 36% of the village's population, while no members of scheduled tribes were recorded. The literacy rate of the village was 25% (648 men and 151 women). 918 people were classified as main workers (853 men and 65 women), while 305 people were classified as marginal workers (all women); the remaining 1,980 residents were non-workers. The breakdown of main workers by employment category was as follows: 746 cultivators (i.e. people who owned or leased their own land); 94 agricultural labourers (i.e. people who worked someone else's land in return for payment); 1 worker in livestock, forestry, fishing, hunting, plantations, orchards, etc.; 0 in mining and quarrying; 0 household industry workers; 14 workers employed in other manufacturing, processing, service, and repair roles; 3 construction workers; 6 employed in trade and commerce; 1 employed in transport, storage, and communications; and 53 in other services.
