= Satanpur, Dih, Raebareli =

Satanpur Sātānpur
- Village
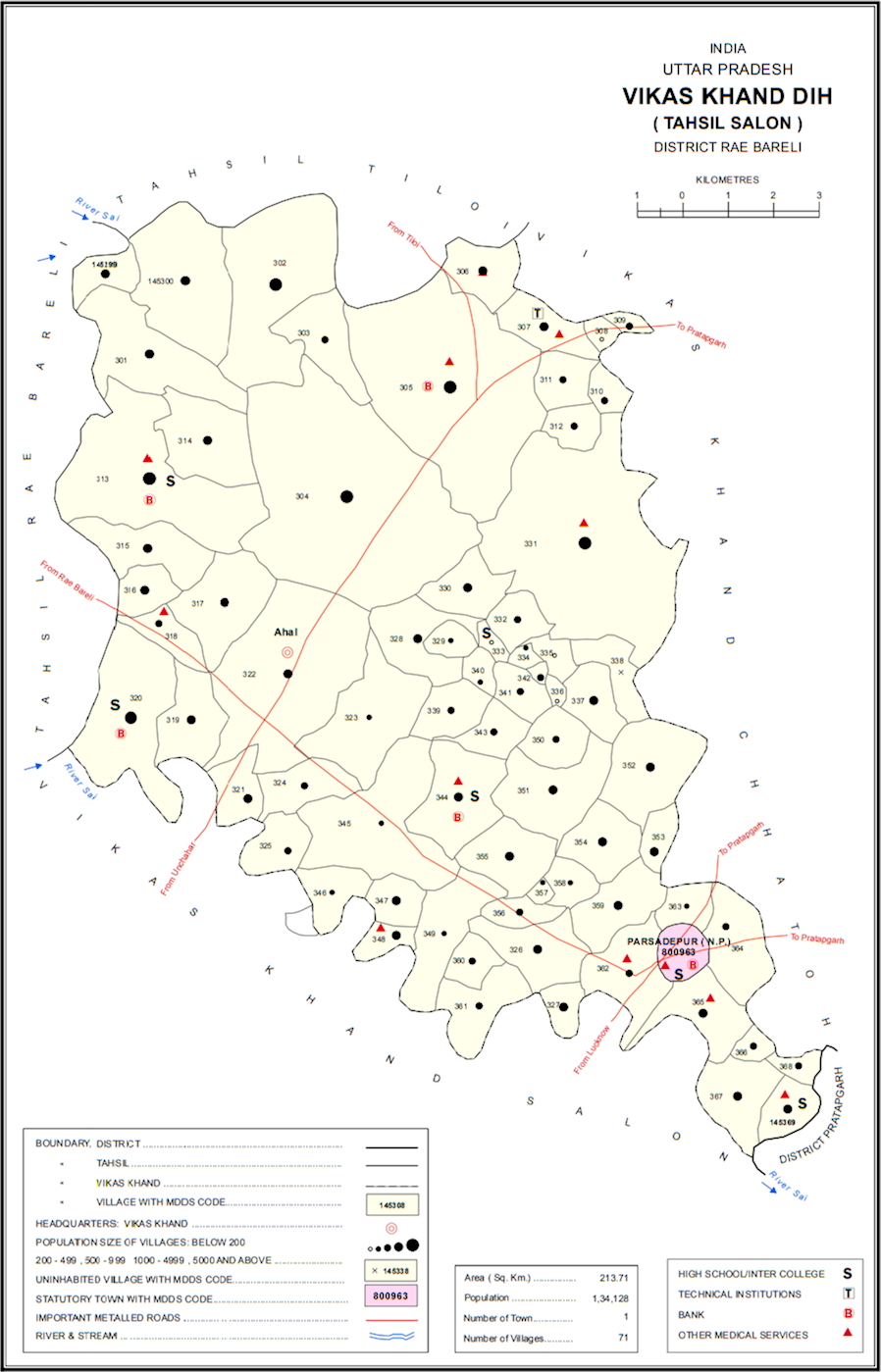
- Map showing Satanpur (#340) in Dih CD block

- Location in Uttar Pradesh, India
- Coordinates: 26.137027°N 81.457539°E
- Country: India
- State: Uttar Pradesh
- District: Raebareli

Area
  - Total: 0.425 km^{2} (0.164 sq mi)

Population (2011)
  - Total: 241
  - Density: 567/km^{2} (1,470/sq mi)

Languages
  - Official: Hindi
- Time zone: UTC+5:30 (IST)
- Vehicle registration: UP-35

Satanpur is a village in Dih block of Rae Bareli district, Uttar Pradesh, India. It is located 25 km from Raebareli, the district headquarters. As of 2011, it has a population of 241 people, in 41 households. It has no schools and no healthcare facilities, and it does not host a permanent market or a weekly haat. It belongs to the nyaya panchayat of Khetaudhan.

The 1951 census recorded Satanpur as comprising 1 hamlet, with a total population of 109 people (58 male and 51 female), in 20 households and 20 physical houses. The area of the village was given as 114 acres. 2 residents were literate, both male. The village was listed as belonging to the pargana of Rokha and the thana of Nasirabad.

The 1961 census recorded Satanpur as comprising 1 hamlet, with a total population of 100 people (51 male and 49 female), in 18 households and 18 physical houses. The area of the village was given as 114 acres.

The 1981 census recorded Satanpur as having a population of 134 people, in 31 households, and having an area of 46.14 hectares. The main staple foods were listed as wheat and rice.

The 1991 census recorded Satanpur as having a total population of 160 people (76 male and 84 female), in 28 households and 28 physical houses. The area of the village was listed as 42 hectares. Members of the 0-6 age group numbered 34, or 21% of the total; this group was 44% male (15) and 56% female (19). Members of scheduled castes made up 56% of the village's population, while no members of scheduled tribes were recorded. The literacy rate of the village was 24% (32 men and 7 women). 42 people were classified as main workers (40 men and 2 women), while 21 people were classified as marginal workers (all women); the remaining 97 residents were non-workers. The breakdown of main workers by employment category was as follows: 40 cultivators (i.e. people who owned or leased their own land); 2 agricultural labourers (i.e. people who worked someone else's land in return for payment); 0 workers in livestock, forestry, fishing, hunting, plantations, orchards, etc.; 0 in mining and quarrying; 0 household industry workers; 0 workers employed in other manufacturing, processing, service, and repair roles; 0 construction workers; 0 employed in trade and commerce; 0 employed in transport, storage, and communications; and 0 in other services.
