= Kol, Raebareli =

Kol
- Village
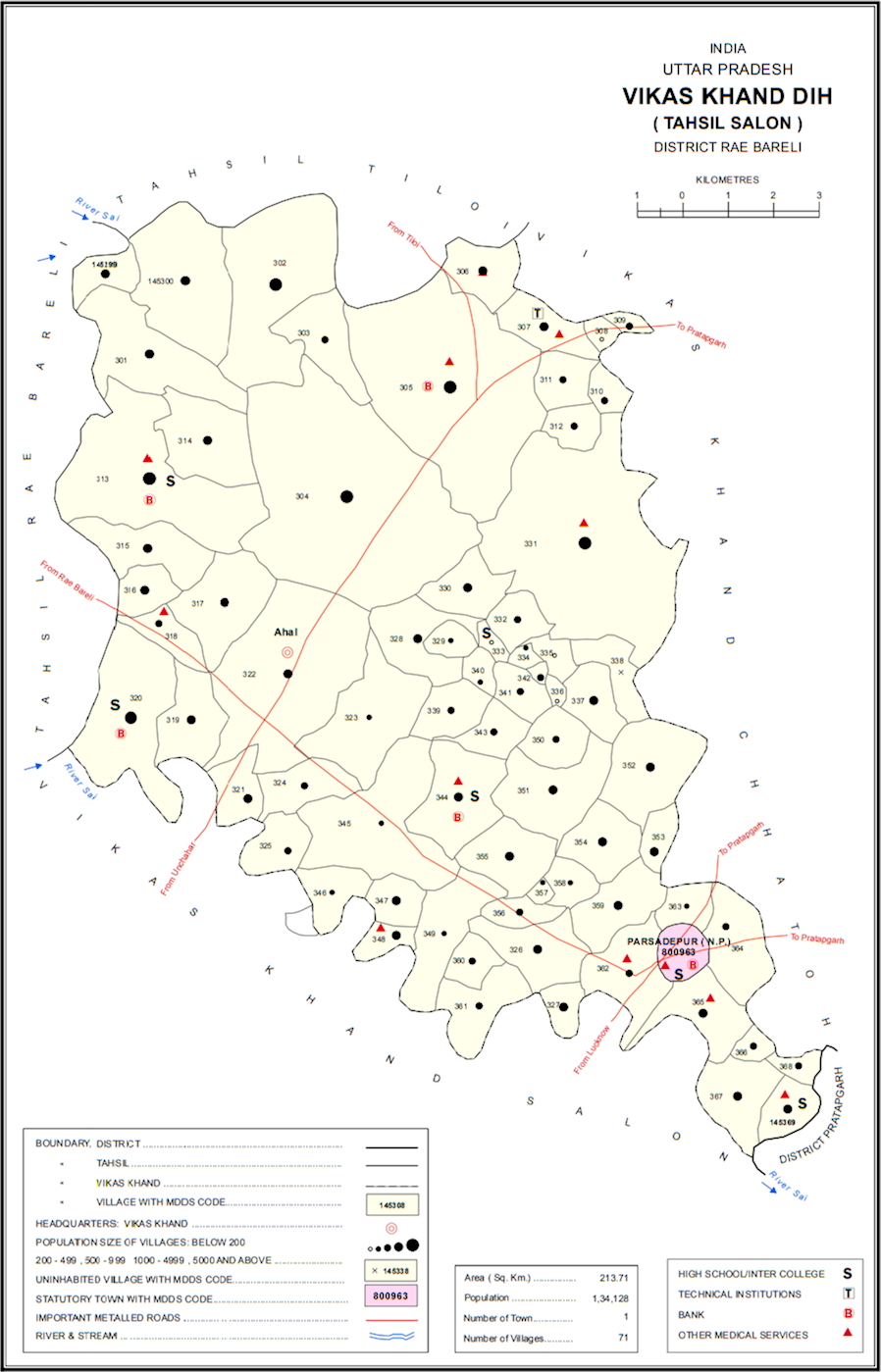
- Map showing Kol (#323) in Dih CD block

- Location in Uttar Pradesh, India
- Coordinates: 26.106625°N 81.398444°E
- Country: India
- State: Uttar Pradesh
- District: Raebareli

Area
  - Total: 0.65 km^{2} (0.25 sq mi)

Population (2011)
  - Total: 216
  - Density: 330/km^{2} (860/sq mi)

Languages
  - Official: Hindi
- Time zone: UTC+5:30 (IST)
- Vehicle registration: UP-35

Kol is a village in Dih block of Rae Bareli district, Uttar Pradesh, India. It is located 23 km from Raebareli, the district headquarters. As of 2011, it has a population of 216 people, in 44 households. It has no schools and no healthcare facilities, and it does not host a permanent market or weekly haat. It belongs to the nyaya panchayat of Dih.

The 1951 census recorded Kol as comprising 1 hamlet, with a total population of 86 people (47 male and 39 female), in 21 households and 16 physical houses. The area of the village was given as 313 acres. 3 residents were literate, all male. The village was listed as belonging to the pargana of Parshadepur and the thana of Salon.

The 1961 census recorded Kol as comprising 1 hamlet, with a total population of 98 people (54 male and 44 female), in 22 households and 21 physical houses. The area of the village was given as 313 acres.

The 1981 census recorded Kol as having a population of 146 people, in 31 households, and having an area of 128.29 hectares. The main staple foods were listed as wheat and barley.

The 1991 census recorded Kol as having a total population of 189 people (88 male and 101 female), in 39 households and 39 physical houses. The area of the village was listed as 128 hectares. Members of the 0-6 age group numbered 42, or 22% of the total; this group was 50% male (21) and 50% female (21). Members of scheduled castes made up 11% of the village's population, while no members of scheduled tribes were recorded. The literacy rate of the village was 32% (39 men and 21 women). 48 people were classified as main workers (47 men and 1 woman), while 39 people were classified as marginal workers (all women); the remaining 102 residents were non-workers. The breakdown of main workers by employment category was as follows: 45 cultivators (i.e. people who owned or leased their own land); 1 agricultural labourer (i.e. people who worked someone else's land in return for payment); 1 worker in livestock, forestry, fishing, hunting, plantations, orchards, etc.; 0 in mining and quarrying; 0 household industry workers; 0 workers employed in other manufacturing, processing, service, and repair roles; 0 construction workers; 0 employed in trade and commerce; 0 employed in transport, storage, and communications; and 1 in other services.
