= Dilawalpur, Raebareli =

Dilawalpur Dilāwalpur
- Village
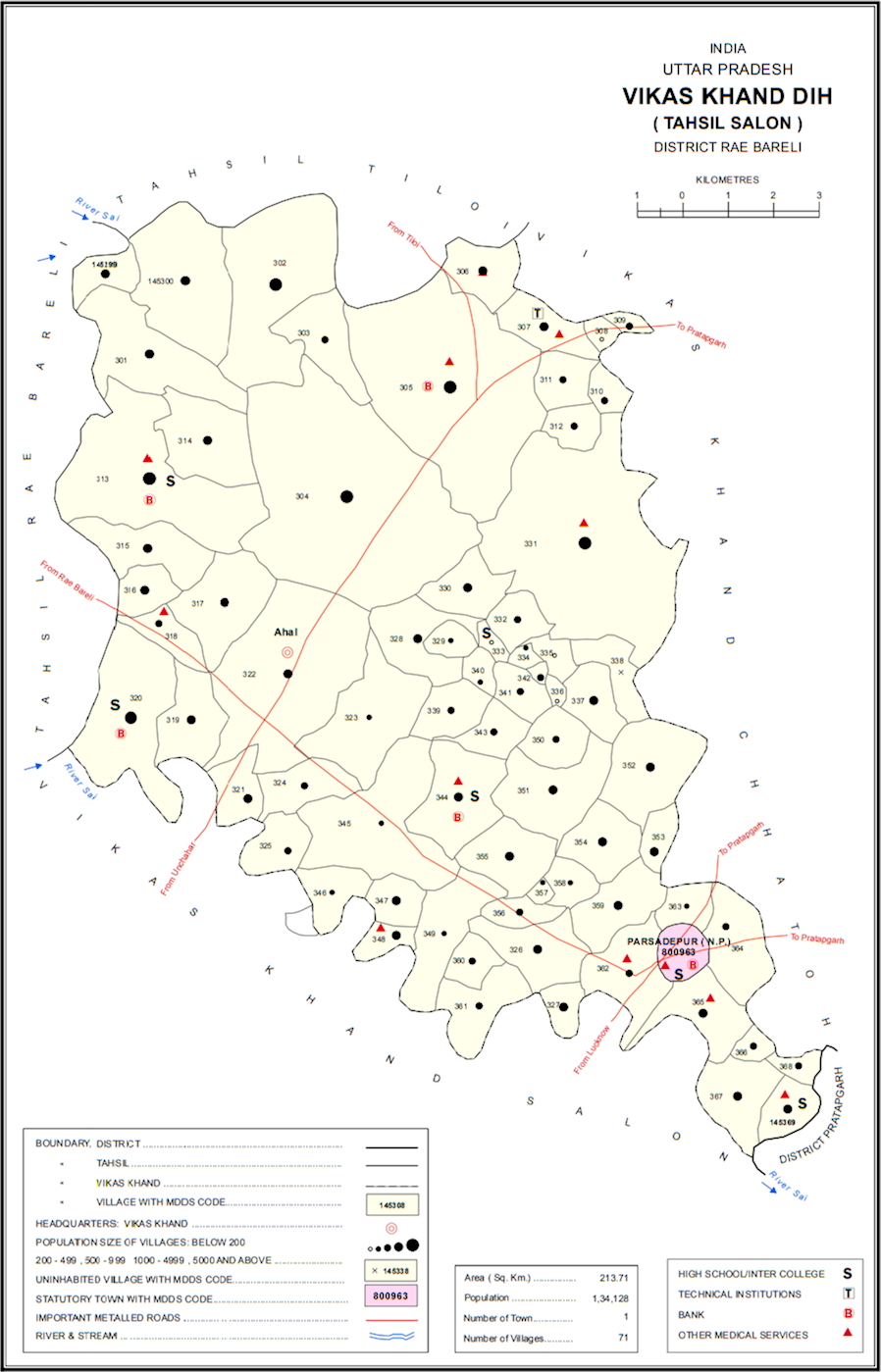
- Map showing Dilawalpur (#355) in Dih CD block

- Location in Uttar Pradesh, India
- Coordinates: 26.100882°N 81.469404°E
- Country: India
- State: Uttar Pradesh
- District: Raebareli

Area
  - Total: 3.191 km^{2} (1.232 sq mi)

Population (2011)
  - Total: 1,683
  - Density: 527.4/km^{2} (1,366/sq mi)

Languages
  - Official: Hindi
- Time zone: UTC+5:30 (IST)
- Vehicle registration: UP-35

Dilawalpur is a village in Dih block of Rae Bareli district, Uttar Pradesh, India. It is located 28 km from Raebareli, the district headquarters. As of 2011, it has a population of 1,683 people, in 305 households. It has 2 primary schools and no healthcare facilities, and it does not host a permanent market or a weekly haat. It belongs to the nyaya panchayat of Atawan.

The 1951 census recorded Dilawalpur as comprising 7 hamlets, with a total population of 738 people (373 male and 365 female), in 181 households and 160 physical houses. The area of the village was given as 822 acres. 6 residents were literate, 5 male and 1 female. The village was listed as belonging to the pargana of Parshadepur and the thana of Salon.

The 1961 census recorded Dilawalpur (as "Dilawarpur") as comprising 7 hamlets, with a total population of 802 people (400 male and 402 female), in 195 households and 190 physical houses. The area of the village was given as 822 acres.

The 1981 census recorded Dilawalpur as having a population of 1,146 people, in 242 households, and having an area of 332.65 hectares. The main staple foods were listed as wheat and rice.

The 1991 census recorded Dilawalpur as having a total population of 1,460 people (778 male and 682 female), in 264 households and 264 physical houses. The area of the village was listed as 326 hectares. Members of the 0-6 age group numbered 307, or 21% of the total; this group was 52% male (161) and 48% female (146). Members of scheduled castes made up 32% of the village's population, while no members of scheduled tribes were recorded. The literacy rate of the village was 19% (238 men and 39 women). 394 people were classified as main workers (387 men and 7 women), while 0 people were classified as marginal workers; the remaining 1,066 residents were non-workers. The breakdown of main workers by employment category was as follows: 344 cultivators (i.e. people who owned or leased their own land); 28 agricultural labourers (i.e. people who worked someone else's land in return for payment); 1 worker in livestock, forestry, fishing, hunting, plantations, orchards, etc.; 0 in mining and quarrying; 0 household industry workers; 15 workers employed in other manufacturing, processing, service, and repair roles; 0 construction workers; 1 employed in trade and commerce; 0 employed in transport, storage, and communications; and 5 in other services.
