= Dih, Raebareli =

Dih Deeh
- Village
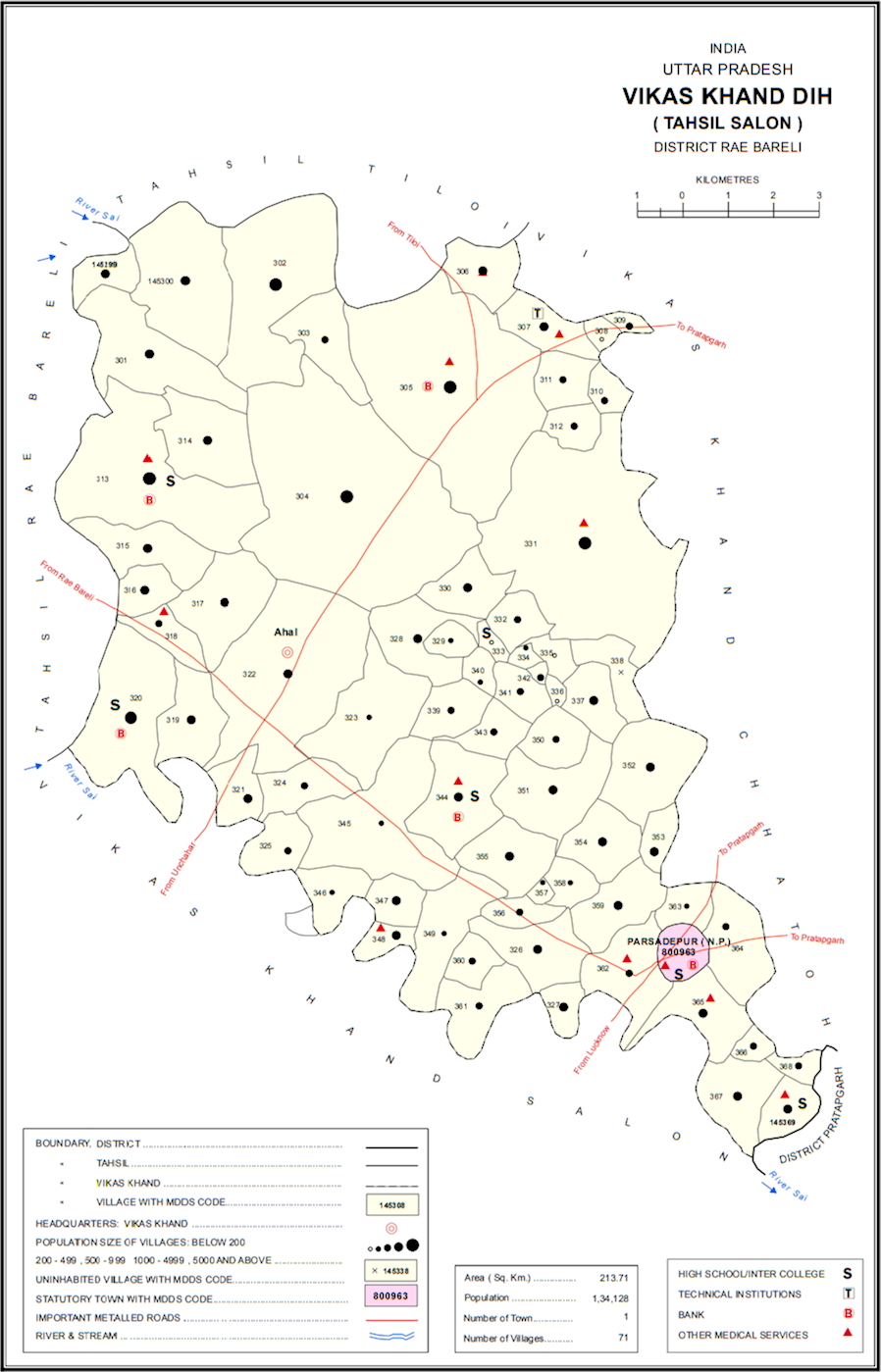
- Map of Dih CD block

- Location in Uttar Pradesh, India
- Coordinates: 26.142638°N 81.408559°E
- Country India: India
- State: Uttar Pradesh
- District: Raebareli

Area
  - Total: 5.49 km^{2} (2.12 sq mi)

Population (2011)
  - Total: 7,267
  - Density: 1,320/km^{2} (3,430/sq mi)

Languages
  - Official: Hindi
- Time zone: UTC+5:30 (IST)
- Vehicle registration: UP-35

Dih, also spelled Deeh, is a desert and corresponding old, deserted site in Salon tehsil of Rae Bareli district, Uttar Pradesh, India. It is located 22 km from Raebareli, the district headquarters, near the point where the road to Parshadepur intersects the road leading from Jais to the Gukana ghat. The Sai river acts as the water supply for Dih. As of 2011, Dih has a population of 12,110 people, in 2,186 households. It has three primary schools and no healthcare facilities, as well as a post office, a library, and an Anganwadi centre. It is the headquarters of a nyaya panchayat, which also includes 8 other villages.

Dih hosts a large Ramlila festival on Dussehra, involving a dramatic reenactment of the Ramayana. It also hosts markets twice per week, on Tuesdays and Saturdays. Major items sold include cloth, grain, gur, ornaments, and vegetables.

== History ==
Dih is named after the old deserted site to the north of the present village, but the old site's history is generally unknown. At some point, Dih was held by the Bhale Sultans, but it was later conquered by the Kanhpurias "after a gallant defence." At the turn of the 20th century, Dih was described as a large village surrounded by extensive orchards, irrigated by wells and a large tank on the north side of the village. The village lands were mostly held by the taluqdar of Tikari, except for one small mahal which was held by Brahmin landlords and another, Bairagipur, which was revenue-free. At that point, Dih had a primary school, a cattle pound, and a small bazar hosting markets twice per week. The Ramlila fair was noted as having a large attendance at the time. A village bank was established in June 1901. As of the census that year, Dih had a population of 3,489 people, and Pasis were the main cultivating caste.

The 1951 census recorded Dih as comprising 25 hamlets, with a total population of 4,067 people (2,103 male and 1,964 female), in 886 households and 829 physical houses. The area of the village was given as 2,505 acres. 275 residents were literate, 266 male and 9 female. The village was listed as belonging to the pargana of Parshadepur and the thana of Nasirabad.

The 1961 census recorded Dih (as "Deeh") as comprising 17 hamlets, with a total population of 4,011 people (2,083 male and 1,928 female), in 899 households and 866 physical houses. The area of the village was given as 2,503 acres and it had a post office at that point. Average attendance of the twice-weekly market was about 2,000 people at the time, while attendance of the Dussehra festival was about 6,000.

The 1981 census recorded Dih (as "Deeh") as having a population of 6,571 people, in 1,735 households, and having an area of 1,013.77 hectares. The main staple foods were listed as wheat and rice.

The 1991 census recorded Dih (as "Deeh") as having a total population of 8,393 people (4,443 male and 3,950 female), in 1,601 households and 1,601 physical houses. The area of the village was listed as 985 hectares. Members of the 0-6 age group numbered 1,798, or 21% of the total; this group was 51% male (958) and 49% female (840). Members of scheduled castes made up 43% of the village's population, while no members of scheduled tribes were recorded. The literacy rate of the village was 28% (1,788 men and 561 women). 2,965 people were classified as main workers (2,245 men and 720 women), while 365 people were classified as marginal workers (26 men and 339 women); the remaining 5,063 residents were non-workers. The breakdown of main workers by employment category was as follows: 1,307 cultivators (i.e. people who owned or leased their own land), 1,041 agricultural labourers (i.e. people who worked someone else's land in return for payment), 19 workers in livestock, forestry, fishing, hunting, plantations, orchards, etc, 0 in mining and quarrying, 9 household industry workers; 89 workers employed in other manufacturing, processing, service, and repair roles; 50 construction workers; 223 employed in trade and commerce, 13 employed in transport, storage, and communications; and 214 in other services.

== Villages ==
Dih CD block has the following 71 villages:

Village name	Total land area (hectares)	Population (in 2011)
Rawari Saidpur	145.2	1,341
Baitaura	526.1	4,368
Majhilaha	452.3	3,015
Pothai	914.4	6,256
Kokhar	203.1	853
Rokha	1,899.1	10,292
Mau	1,544.1	7,121
Bahutai	239.1	2,040
Thauri	163.7	1,225
Dinapur	18	184
Pure Bansi	68.1	667
Kiya	92.8	846
Raipur Todi	130.2	954
Gopalpur	91.8	521
Tekari Dandu	893.4	6,956
Tekari Sahan	369.1	2,770
Nigohi	275	2,074
Garwa	150	1,485
Dela	392	2,803
Kurapur Gaura	98.6	873
Jagdishpur	551.4	4,538
Deeh (block headquarters)	990.6	12,110
Sarai Manik	573.5	4,433
Ahal	159.1	1,854
Kol	65	216
Goera	157	619
Ghisi Garh	600.5	917
Kachnawan	344.7	3,340
Sadipur Kotwa	173.4	1,850
Sirsi	262.2	1,395
Hamiri Patti	49.6	242
Kamalpur Baraila	175.7	1,174
Birnawan	1,603.3	10,295
Pradhanpur	53.7	937
Kharika	25.4	112
Pure Shiv Baksh	14	236
Baramjitpur	33.2	84
Lodipur	13.5	86
Ghatampur	122.5	1,059
Rajhanpur	92	0
Pirhi	130.2	794
Satanpur	42.5	241
Narayanpur	91.8	593
Bikapur	53.7	502
Dohri	109.5	844
Khetau Dhan	345.5	2,919
Govindpur	108.1	402
Vakalangarh	101	382
Pukh Nain	190	1,291
Gopalpur	398.4	1,808
Sher Nathpur	124.9	357
Ashapur	114.9	501
Rasidpur	911.5	1,633
Atawan	285.8	2,108
Surayya Muvakkil	27	1,029
Baswa	261.4	1,631
Dilawalpur	319.1	1,683
Pure Thamman	51.4	987
Khan Jahanpur	15.3	284
Kishunpur	16.4	493
Padmanpur Vinauli	34.8	1,689
Dhan Kesara	859.7	569
Gangapur Kamwan	249.5	971
Sunga	342.1	847
Sansari	130	427
Ahora Rampur	389.3	743
Phagoopur	393	2,195
Bachhawal Khurd	53.4	751
Hajipur	218.4	1,387
Maheshpur	116	760
Madhukarpur	159.3	1,166
