= Sarai Manik =

Sarai Manik Sarāi Mānik
- Village
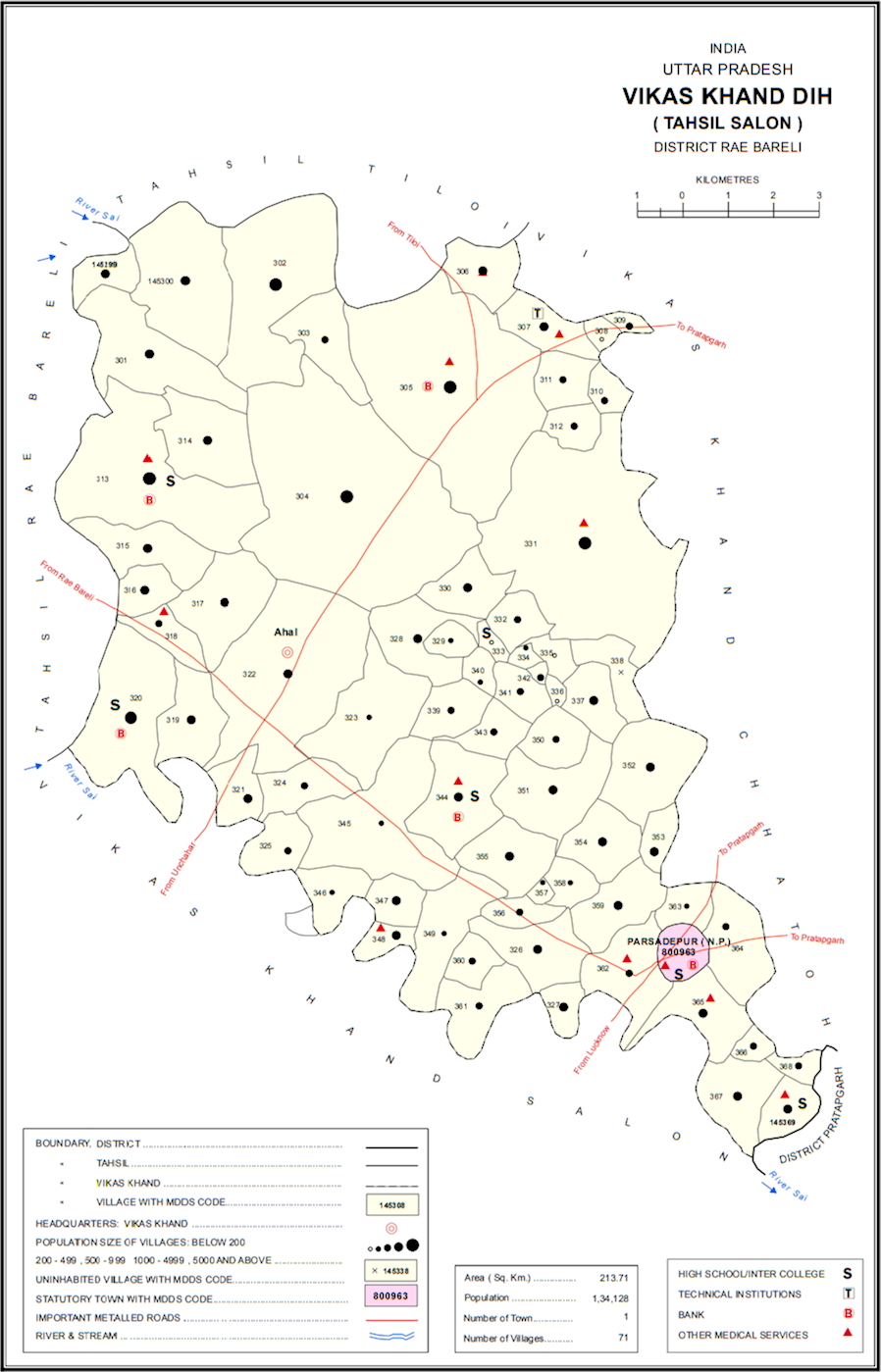
- Map showing Sarai Manik (#321) in Dih CD block

- Location in Uttar Pradesh, India
- Coordinates: 26.096777°N 81.421509°E
- Country: India
- State: Uttar Pradesh
- District: Raebareli

Area
  - Total: 5.735 km^{2} (2.214 sq mi)

Population (2011)
  - Total: 4,433
  - Density: 773.0/km^{2} (2,002/sq mi)

Languages
  - Official: Hindi
- Time zone: UTC+5:30 (IST)
- Vehicle registration: UP-35

Sarai Manik is a village in Dih block of Rae Bareli district, Uttar Pradesh, India. It is located 23 km from Raebareli, the district headquarters. As of 2011, it has a population of 4,433 people, in 878 households. It has two primary schools. However, the village has no healthcare facilities, permanent market or weekly haat. It belongs to the nyaya panchayat of Dih.

The 1951 census recorded Sarai Manik as comprising 18 hamlets, with a total population of 1,607 people (811 male and 796 female), in 346 households and 320 physical houses. The area of the village was given as 1,447 acres. 27 residents were literate, all male. The village was listed as belonging to the pargana of Parshadepur and the thana of Salon.

The 1961 census recorded Sarai Manik as comprising 21 hamlets, with a total population of 1,776 people (925 male and 851 female), in 362 households and 362 physical houses. The area of the village was given as 1,448 acres.

The 1981 census recorded Sarai Manik as having a population of 2,484 people, in 583 households, and having an area of 577.10 hectares. The main staple foods were listed as wheat and bajra.

The 1991 census recorded Sarai Manik as having a total population of 2,825 people (1,521 male and 1,304 female), in 614 households and 604 physical houses. The area of the village was listed as 576 hectares. Members of the 0-6 age group numbered 648, or 23% of the total; this group was 50% male (323) and 50% female (325). Members of scheduled castes made up 25% of the village's population, while no members of scheduled tribes were recorded. The literacy rate of the village was 14% (348 men and 54 women). 1,386 people were classified as main workers (902 men and 484 women), while 138 people were classified as marginal workers (all women); the remaining 1,301 residents were non-workers. The breakdown of main workers by employment category was as follows: 1,155 cultivators (i.e. people who owned or leased their own land); 196 agricultural labourers (i.e. people who worked someone else's land in return for payment); 2 workers in livestock, forestry, fishing, hunting, plantations, orchards, etc.; 0 in mining and quarrying; 5 household industry workers; 19 workers employed in other manufacturing, processing, service, and repair roles; 5 construction workers; 6 employed in trade and commerce; 1 employed in transport, storage, and communications; and 21 in other services.
