= Pure Thamman =

Pure Thamman Pura Thamman
- Village
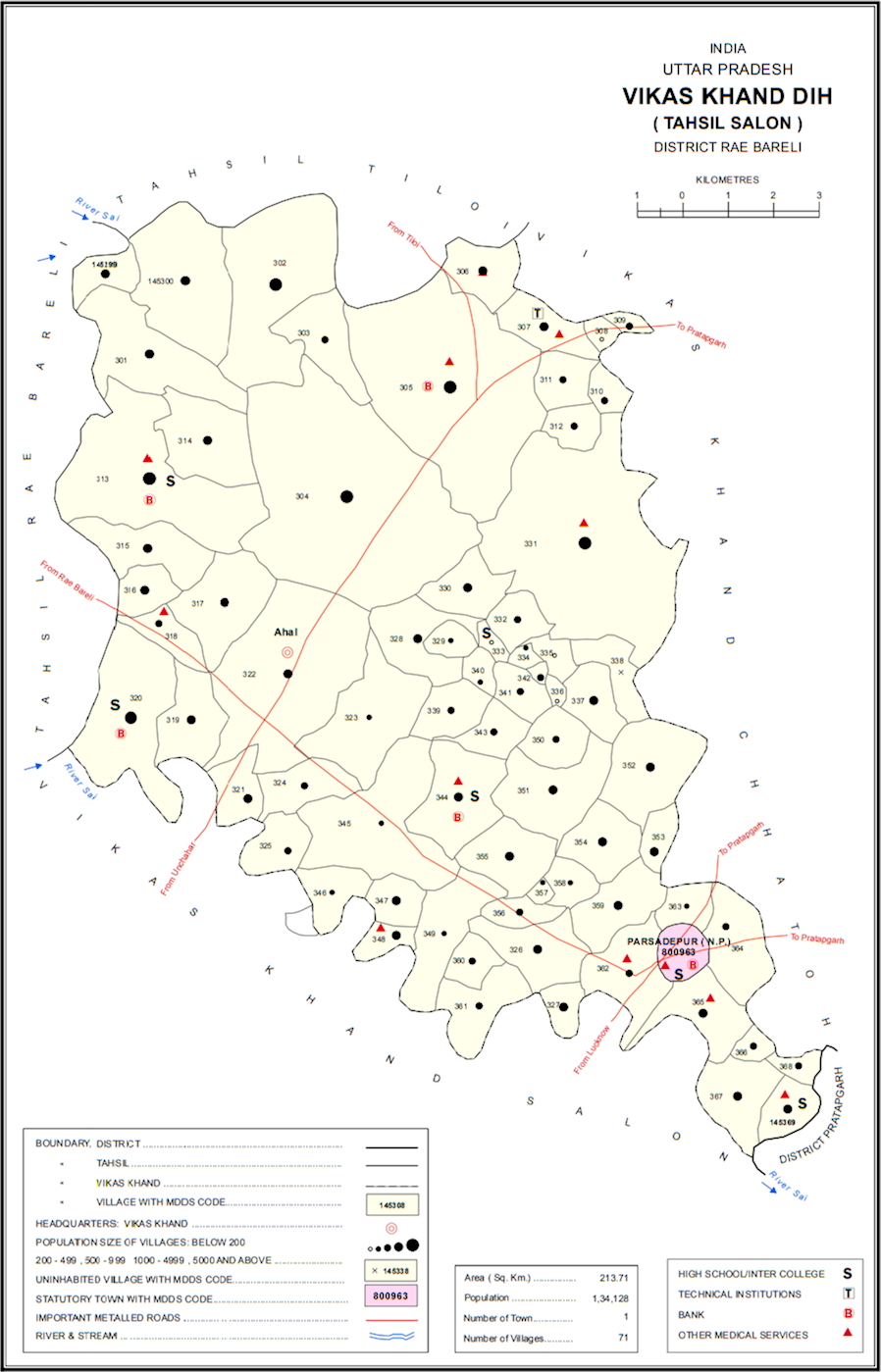
- Map showing Pure Thamman (#356) in Dih CD block

- Location in Uttar Pradesh, India
- Coordinates: 26.091016°N 81.473868°E
- Country: India
- State: Uttar Pradesh
- District: Raebareli

Area
  - Total: 0.514 km^{2} (0.198 sq mi)

Population (2011)
  - Total: 987
  - Density: 1,920/km^{2} (4,970/sq mi)

Languages
  - Official: Hindi
- Time zone: UTC+5:30 (IST)
- Vehicle registration: UP-35

Pure Thamman is a village in Dih block of Rae Bareli district, Uttar Pradesh, India. It is located 28 km from Salon, the tehsil headquarters. As of 2011, it has a population of 987 people, in 187 households. It has one primary school and no healthcare facilities, and it does not host a permanent market or a weekly haat. It belongs to the nyaya panchayat of Atawan.

The 1951 census recorded Pure Thamman as comprising 2 hamlets, with a total population of 379 people (184 male and 195 female), in 73 households and 65 physical houses. The area of the village was given as 128 acres. 31 residents were literate, all male. The village was listed as belonging to the pargana of Parshadepur and the thana of Salon.

The 1961 census recorded Pure Thamman as comprising 2 hamlets, with a total population of 351 people (172 male and 179 female), in 84 households and 80 physical houses. The area of the village was given as 128 acres.

The 1981 census recorded Pure Thamman as having a population of 459 people, in 109 households, and having an area of 50.99 hectares. The main staple foods were listed as wheat and rice.

The 1991 census recorded Pure Thamman as having a total population of 588 people (293 male and 295 female), in 126 households and 126 physical houses. The area of the village was listed as 51 hectares. Members of the 0-6 age group numbered 121, or 21% of the total; this group was 57% male (69) and 43% female (52). Members of scheduled castes made up 20% of the village's population, while no members of scheduled tribes were recorded. The literacy rate of the village was 37% (156 men and 62 women). 192 people were classified as main workers (138 men and 54 women), while 17 people were classified as marginal workers (4 men and 13 women); the remaining 379 residents were non-workers. The breakdown of main workers by employment category was as follows: 162 cultivators (i.e. people who owned or leased their own land); 13 agricultural labourers (i.e. people who worked someone else's land in return for payment); 2 workers in livestock, forestry, fishing, hunting, plantations, orchards, etc.; 0 in mining and quarrying; 0 household industry workers; 4 workers employed in other manufacturing, processing, service, and repair roles; 0 construction workers; 1 employed in trade and commerce; 0 employed in transport, storage, and communications; and 10 in other services.
