= Pure Bansi =

Pure Bansi Pura Bansi
- Village
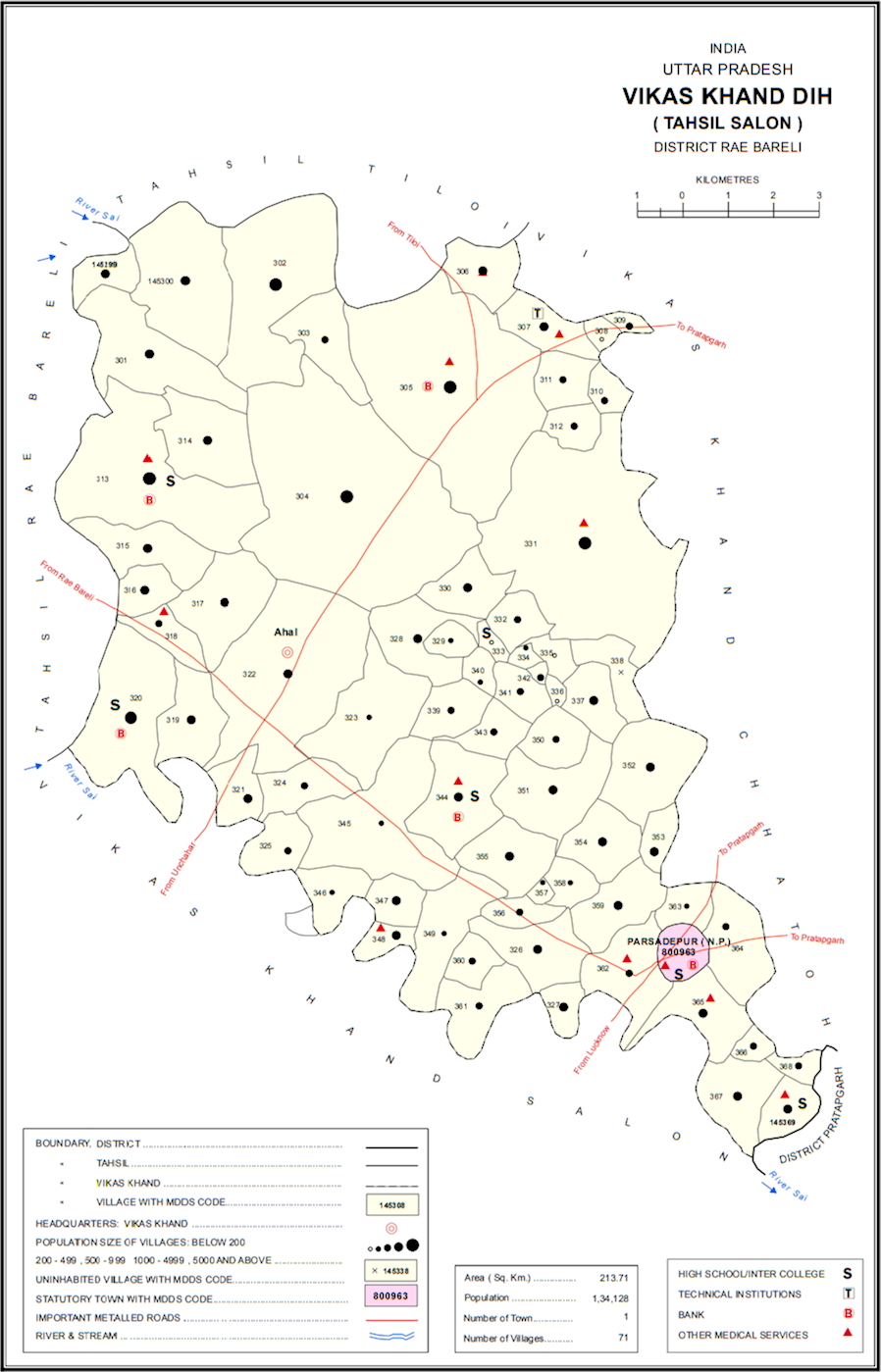
- Map showing Pure Bansi (#309) in Dih CD block

- Location in Uttar Pradesh, India
- Coordinates: 26.209801°N 81.490157°E
- Country: India
- State: Uttar Pradesh
- District: Raebareli

Area
  - Total: 0.618 km^{2} (0.239 sq mi)

Population (2011)
  - Total: 667
  - Density: 1,080/km^{2} (2,800/sq mi)

Languages
  - Official: Hindi
- Time zone: UTC+5:30 (IST)
- Vehicle registration: UP-35

Pure Bansi is a large village in Dih block of Rae Bareli district, Uttar Pradesh, India. It is located 21 km from Raebareli, the district headquarters. As of 2011, it has a population of 667 people, in 123 households. It has one primary school and no healthcare facilities. It hosts a permanent market but not a weekly haat. Pure Bansi belongs to the nyaya panchayat of Mau.

The 1951 census recorded Pure Bansi as comprising 2 hamlets, with a population of 224 people (102 male and 122 female), in 45 households and 44 physical houses. The area of the village was given as 179 acres. 1 resident was literate, a male. The village was listed as belonging to the pargana of Rokha and the thana of Nasirabad.

The 1961 census recorded Pure Bansi (as "Pure Banshi") as comprising 1 hamlet, with a total population of 258 people (134 male and 124 female), in 50 households and 50 physical houses. The area of the village was given as 179 acres.

The 1981 census recorded Pure Bansi as having a population of 363 people, in 109 households. The main staple foods were listed as wheat and rice.

The 1991 census recorded Pure Bansi as having a total population of 448 people (231 male and 217 female), in 87 households and 87 physical houses. The area of the village was listed as 69 hectares. Members of the 0-6 age group numbered 97, or 22% of the total; this group was 57% male (55) and 43% female (42). Members of scheduled castes made up 57% of the village's population, while no members of scheduled tribes were recorded. The literacy rate of the village was 11% (49 men and 1 woman). 130 people were classified as main workers (all men), while 46 people were classified as marginal workers (3 men and 43 women); the remaining 272 residents were non-workers. The breakdown of main workers by employment category was as follows: 112 cultivators (i.e. people who owned or leased their own land); 15 agricultural labourers (i.e. people who worked someone else's land in return for payment); 0 workers in livestock, forestry, fishing, hunting, plantations, orchards, etc.; 0 in mining and quarrying; 0 household industry workers; 0 workers employed in other manufacturing, processing, service, and repair roles; 2 construction workers; 0 employed in trade and commerce; 1 employed in transport, storage, and communications; and 0 in other services.
