= Narayanpur, Dih, Raebareli =

Narayanpur Narāyanpur
- Village
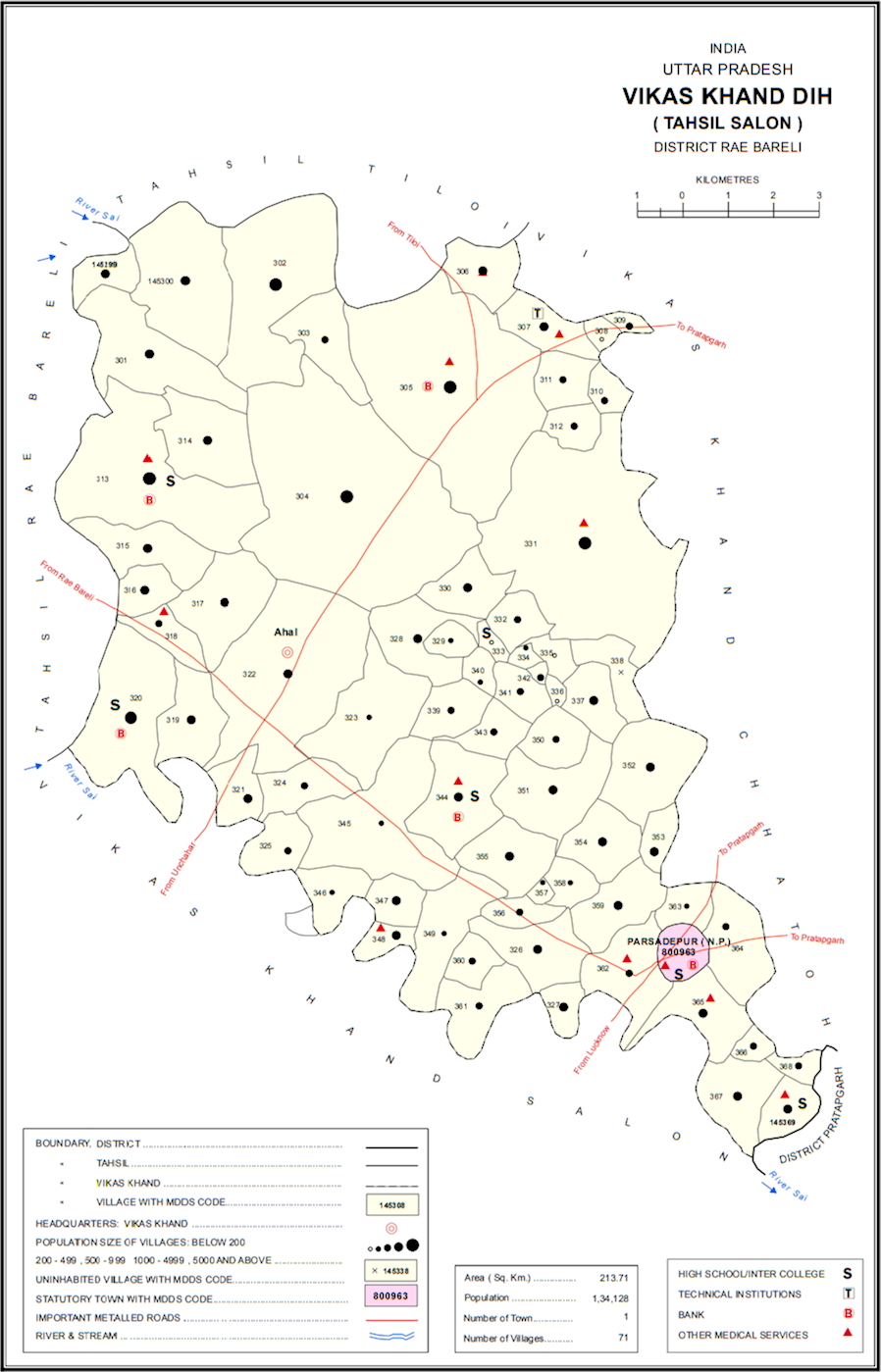
- Map showing Narayanpur (#341) in Dih CD block

- Location in Uttar Pradesh, India
- Coordinates: 26.136526°N 81.46183°E
- Country: India
- State: Uttar Pradesh
- District: Raebareli

Area
  - Total: 0.918 km^{2} (0.354 sq mi)

Population (2011)
  - Total: 593
  - Density: 646/km^{2} (1,670/sq mi)

Languages
  - Official: Hindi
- Time zone: UTC+5:30 (IST)
- Vehicle registration: UP-35

Narayanpur is a village in Dih block of Rae Bareli district, Uttar Pradesh, India. It is located 26 km from Raebareli, the district headquarters. As of 2011, it has a population of 593 people, in 125 households. It has one primary school and no healthcare facilities, and it does not host a permanent market or a weekly haat. It belongs to the nyaya panchayat of Khetaudhan.

The 1951 census recorded Narayanpur (as "Narainpur") as comprising 1 hamlet, with a total population of 265 people (134 male and 131 female), in 60 households and 55 physical houses. The area of the village was given as 228 acres. 20 residents were literate, 18 male and 2 female. The village was listed as belonging to the pargana of Rokha and the thana of Nasirabad.

The 1961 census recorded Narayanpur (as "Narainpur") as comprising 2 hamlets, with a total population of 294 people (160 male and 134 female), in 68 households and 68 physical houses. The area of the village was given as 228 acres.

The 1981 census recorded Narayanpur (as "Narainpur") as having a population of 376 people, in 87 households, and having an area of 92.26 hectares. The main staple foods were listed as wheat and rice.

The 1991 census recorded Narayanpur as having a total population of 482 people (240 male and 242 female), in 88 households and 88 physical houses. The area of the village was listed as 92 hectares. Members of the 0-6 age group numbered 108, or 22% of the total; this group was 53% male (57) and 47% female (51). Members of scheduled castes made up 31% of the village's population, while no members of scheduled tribes were recorded. The literacy rate of the village was 25% (95 men and 25 women). 128 people were classified as main workers (all men), while 97 people were classified as a marginal worker (4 men and 93 women); the remaining 257 residents were non-workers. The breakdown of main workers by employment category was as follows: 119 cultivators (i.e. people who owned or leased their own land); 0 agricultural labourers (i.e. people who worked someone else's land in return for payment); 0 workers in livestock, forestry, fishing, hunting, plantations, orchards, etc.; 0 in mining and quarrying; 2 household industry workers; 0 workers employed in other manufacturing, processing, service, and repair roles; 0 construction workers; 0 employed in trade and commerce; 0 employed in transport, storage, and communications; and 7 in other services.
