= Goera, Raebareli =

Goera
- Village
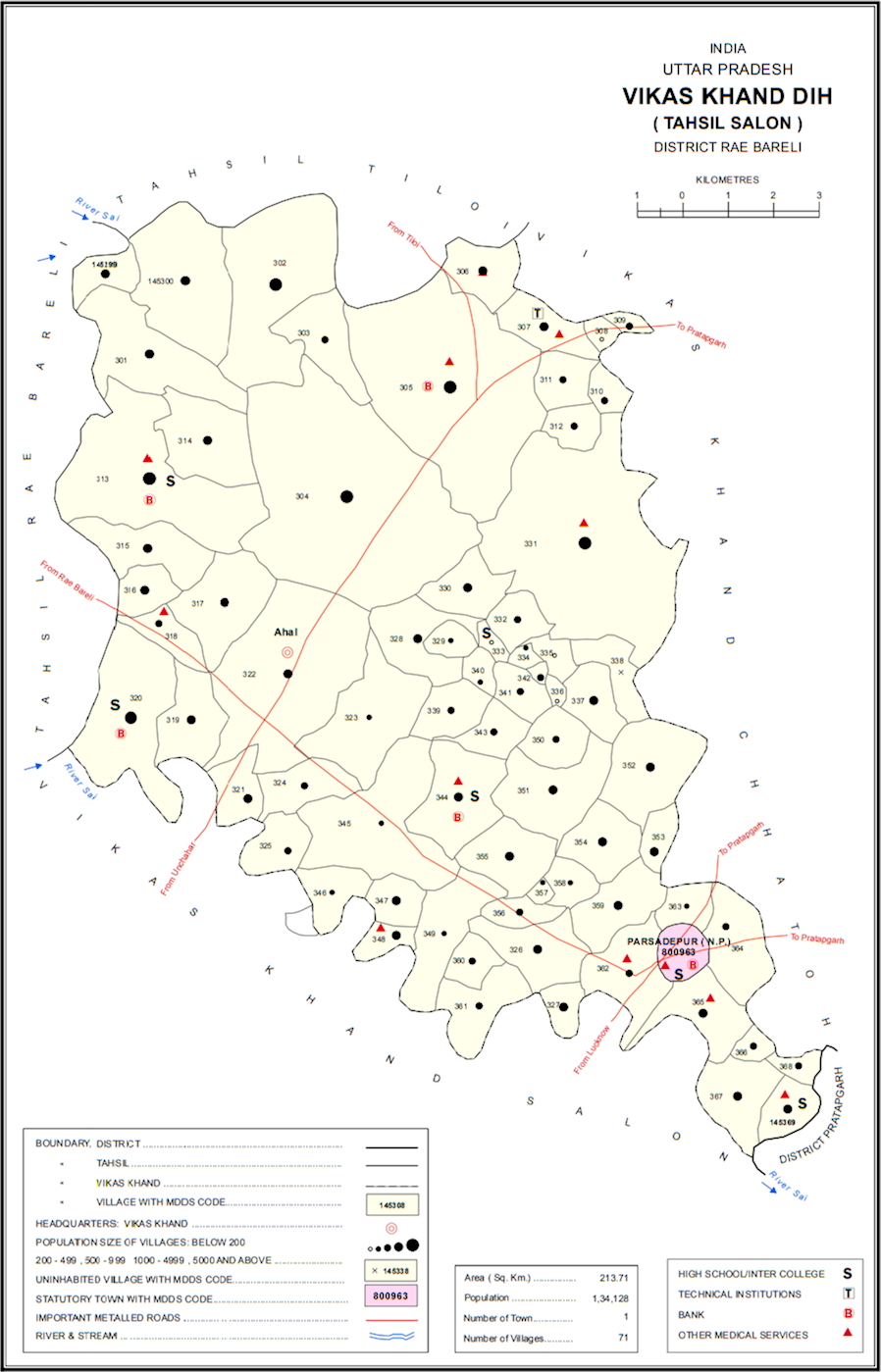
- Map showing Goera (#324) in Dih CD block

- Location in Uttar Pradesh, India
- Coordinates: 26.103734°N 81.410206°E
- Country: India
- State: Uttar Pradesh
- District: Raebareli

Area
  - Total: 1.57 km^{2} (0.61 sq mi)

Population (2011)
  - Total: 619
  - Density: 394/km^{2} (1,020/sq mi)

Languages
  - Official: Hindi
- Time zone: UTC+5:30 (IST)
- Vehicle registration: UP-35

Goera is a village in Dih block of Rae Bareli district, Uttar Pradesh, India. It is located 21 km from Raebareli, the district headquarters. As of 2011, it has a population of 619 people, in 142 households. It has no schools and no healthcare facilities, and it does not host a permanent market or weekly haat. It belongs to the nyaya panchayat of Dih.

The 1951 census recorded Goera (as "Goira") as comprising 1 hamlet, with a total population of 267 people (134 male and 133 female), in 58 households and 53 physical houses. The area of the village was given as 401 acres. 13 residents were literate, all male. The village was listed as belonging to the pargana of Parshadepur and the thana of Salon.

The 1961 census recorded Goera (as "Goira") as comprising 2 hamlets, with a total population of 289 people (141 male and 148 female), in 61 households and 60 physical houses. The area of the village was given as 401 acres.

The 1981 census recorded Goera as having a population of 324 people, in 96 households, and having an area of 157.83 hectares. The main staple foods were listed as wheat and barley.

The 1991 census recorded Goera as having a total population of 505 people (250 male and 255 female), in 104 households and 104 physical houses. The area of the village was listed as 158 hectares. Members of the 0-6 age group numbered 116, or 23% of the total; this group was 51% male (49) and 55% female (57). Members of scheduled castes made up 42% of the village's population, while no members of scheduled tribes were recorded. The literacy rate of the village was 18% (71 men and 18 women). 141 people were classified as main workers (135 men and 6 women), while 37 people were classified as marginal workers (all women); the remaining 304 residents were non-workers. The breakdown of main workers by employment category was as follows: 114 cultivators (i.e. people who owned or leased their own land); 22 agricultural labourers (i.e. people who worked someone else's land in return for payment); 0 workers in livestock, forestry, fishing, hunting, plantations, orchards, etc.; 0 in mining and quarrying; 0 household industry workers; 0 workers employed in other manufacturing, processing, service, and repair roles; 0 construction workers; 0 employed in trade and commerce; 0 employed in transport, storage, and communications; and 5 in other services.
