= Ahal, Raebareli =

Ahal
- Village
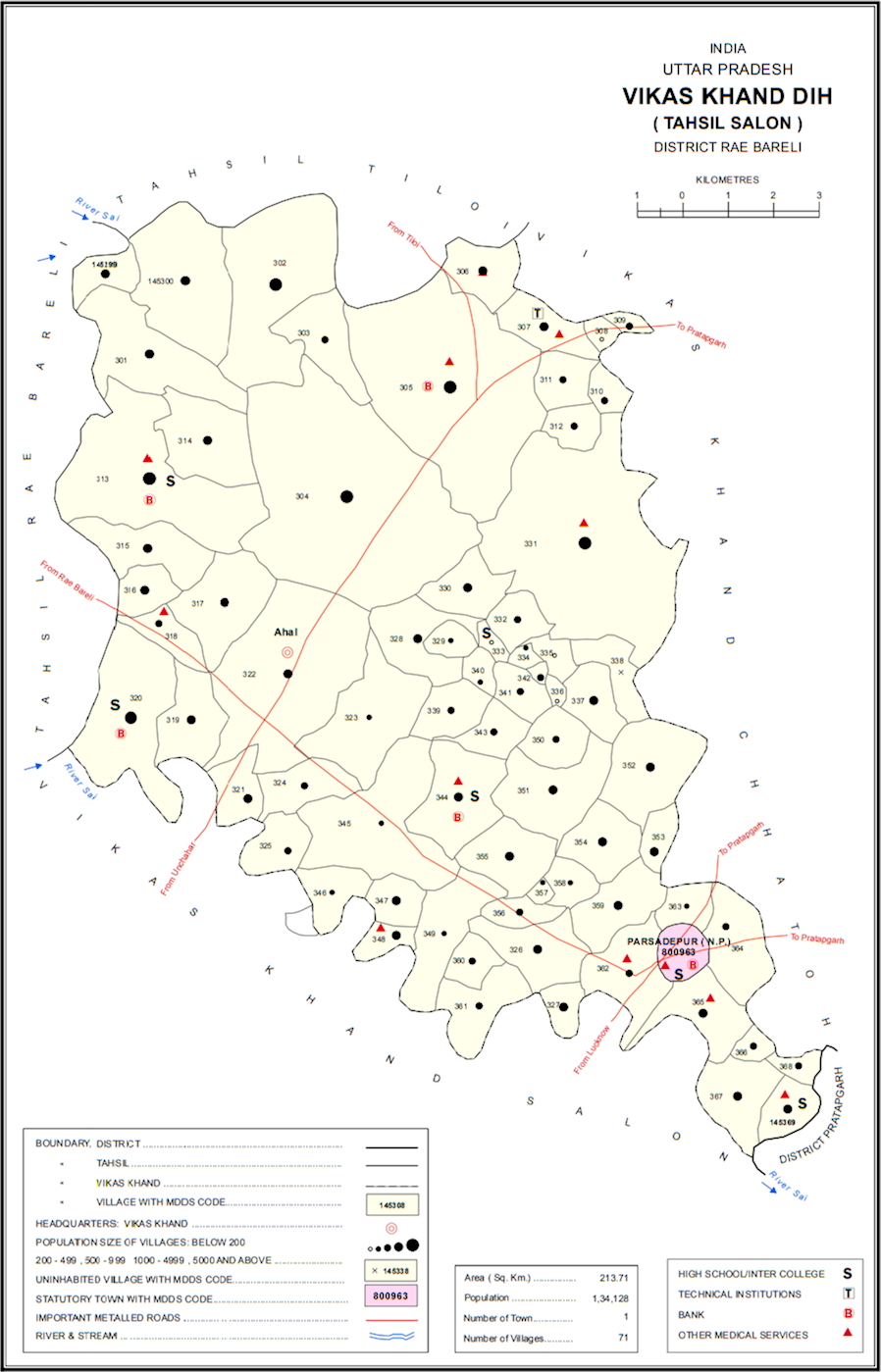
- Map showing Ahal (#322) in Dih CD block

- Location in Uttar Pradesh, India
- Coordinates: 26.110922°N 81.409922°E
- Country: India
- State: Uttar Pradesh
- District: Raebareli

Area
  - Total: 1.591 km^{2} (0.614 sq mi)

Population (2011)
  - Total: 1,854
  - Density: 1,165/km^{2} (3,018/sq mi)

Languages
  - Official: Hindi
- Time zone: UTC+5:30 (IST)
- Vehicle registration: UP-35

Ahal is a village in Dih block of Rae Bareli district, Uttar Pradesh, India. It is located 25 km from Raebareli, the district headquarters. As of 2011, it has a population of 1,854 people, in 355 households. It has one primary school and no healthcare facilities, and it does not host a permanent market or weekly haat. It belongs to the Nyaya panchayat of Dih.

The 1951 census recorded Ahal as comprising 4 hamlets, with a total population of 608 people (309 male and 299 female), in 131 households and 120 physical houses. The area of the village was given as 506 acres. 23 residents were literate, all male. The village was listed as belonging to the pargana of Parshadepur and the thana of Salon.

The 1961 census recorded Ahal as comprising 4 hamlets, with a total population of 727 people (353 male and 374 female), in 150 households and 135 physical houses. The area of the village was given as 506 acres.

The 1981 census recorded Ahal as having a population of 893 people, in 219 households, and having an area of 204.78 hectares. The main staple foods were listed as wheat and rice.

The 1991 census recorded Ahal as having a total population of 1,142 people (597 male and 545 female), in 215 households and 212 physical houses. The area of the village was listed as 212 hectares. Members of the 0-6 age group numbered 234, or 20% of the total; this group was 45% male (114) and 55% female (120). Members of scheduled castes made up 56% of the village's population, while no members of scheduled tribes were recorded. The literacy rate of the village was 20% (207 men and 27 women). 365 people were classified as main workers (327 men and 38 women), while 238 people were classified as marginal workers (15 men and 223 women); the remaining 539 residents were non-workers. The breakdown of main workers by employment category was as follows: 281 cultivators (i.e. people who owned or leased their own land); 61 agricultural labourers (i.e. people who worked someone else's land in return for payment); 0 workers in livestock, forestry, fishing, hunting, plantations, orchards, etc.; 0 in mining and quarrying; 10 household industry workers; 10 workers employed in other manufacturing, processing, service, and repair roles; 2 construction workers; 1 employed in trade and commerce; 0 employed in transport, storage, and communications; and 9 in other services.
