= Nigohi, Raebareli =

Nigohi
- Village
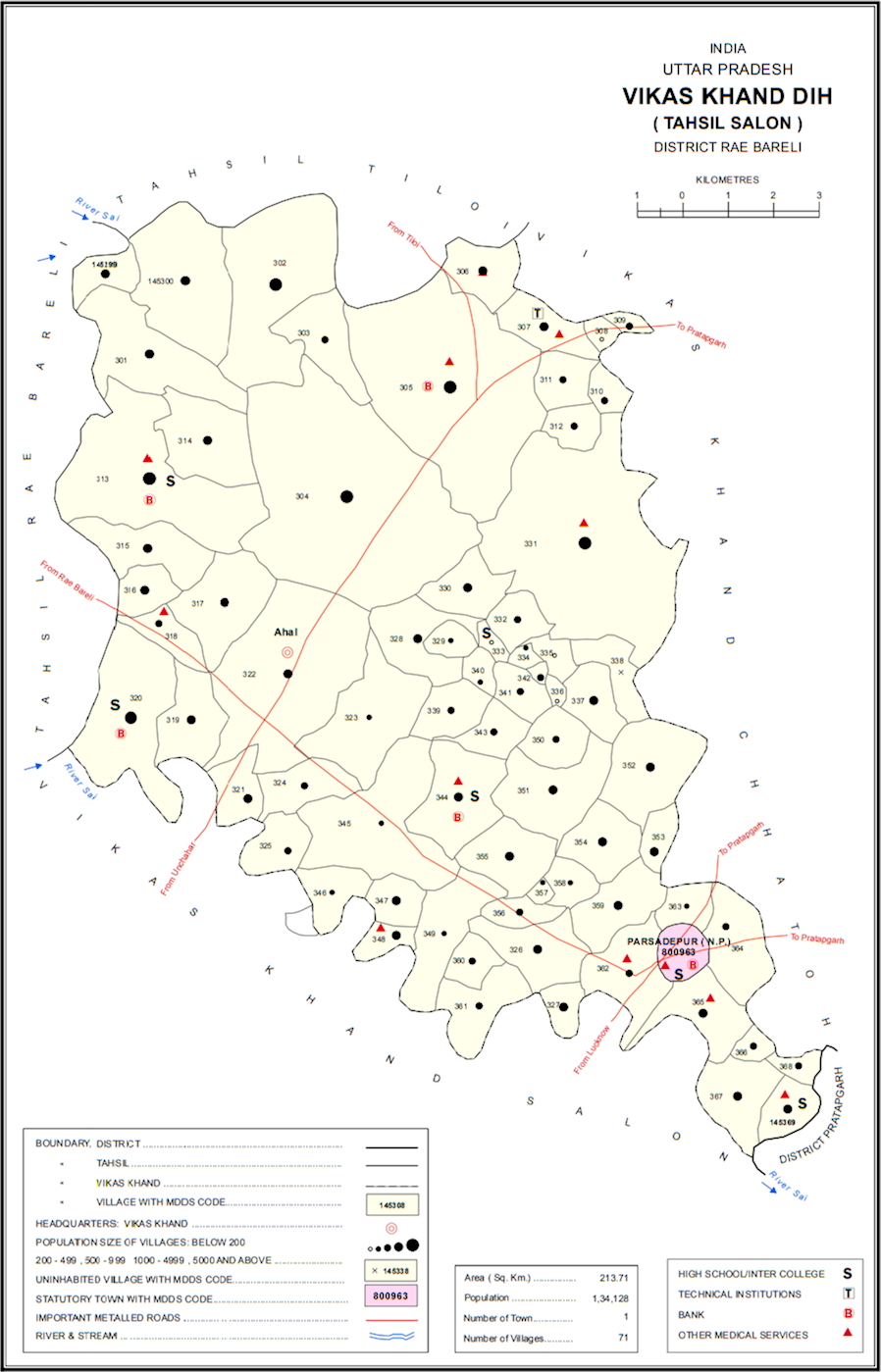
- Map showing Nigohi (#315) in Dih CD block

- Location in Uttar Pradesh, India
- Coordinates: 26.161141°N 81.376687°E
- Country: India
- State: Uttar Pradesh
- District: Raebareli

Area
  - Total: 2.75 km^{2} (1.06 sq mi)

Population (2011)
  - Total: 2,074
  - Density: 754/km^{2} (1,950/sq mi)

Languages
  - Official: Hindi
- Time zone: UTC+5:30 (IST)
- Vehicle registration: UP-35

Nigohi is a village in Dih block of Rae Bareli district, Uttar Pradesh, India. It is located 18 km from Raebareli, the district headquarters. As of 2011, it has a population of 2,074 people, in 369 households. It has two primary schools and no healthcare facilities, and it does not host a permanent market or weekly haat. It belongs to the nyaya panchayat of Tekari Dandu.

The 1951 census recorded Nigohi (as "Nighohi") as comprising 6 hamlets, with a total population of 805 people (405 male and 400 female), in 179 households and 162 physical houses. The area of the village was given as 685 acres. 36 residents were literate, all male. The village was listed as belonging to the pargana of Parshadepur and the thana of Nasirabad.

The 1961 census recorded Nigohi as comprising 6 hamlets, with a total population of 786 people (410 male and 376 female), in 185 households and 172 physical houses. The area of the village was given as 685 acres.

The 1981 census recorded Nigohi as having a population of 1,171 people, in 258 households, and having an area of 277.21 hectares. The main staple foods were listed as wheat and rice.

The 1991 census recorded Nigohi as having a total population of 1,387 people (731 male and 656 female), in 289 households and 270 physical houses. The area of the village was listed as 275 hectares. Members of the 0-6 age group numbered 236, or 17% of the total; this group was 51% male (120) and 49% female (116). Members of scheduled castes made up 28% of the village's population, while no members of scheduled tribes were recorded. The literacy rate of the village was 28% (319 men and 68 women). 493 people were classified as main workers (434 men and 59 women), while 82 people were classified as marginal workers (11 men and 71 women); the remaining 812 residents were non-workers. The breakdown of main workers by employment category was as follows: 316 cultivators (i.e. people who owned or leased their own land); 86 agricultural labourers (i.e. people who worked someone else's land in return for payment); 0 workers in livestock, forestry, fishing, hunting, plantations, orchards, etc.; 0 in mining and quarrying; 0 household industry workers; 71 workers employed in other manufacturing, processing, service, and repair roles; 0 construction workers; 11 employed in trade and commerce; 0 employed in transport, storage, and communications; and 9 in other services.
