= Ninawan =

Ninawan Ninawān
- Village
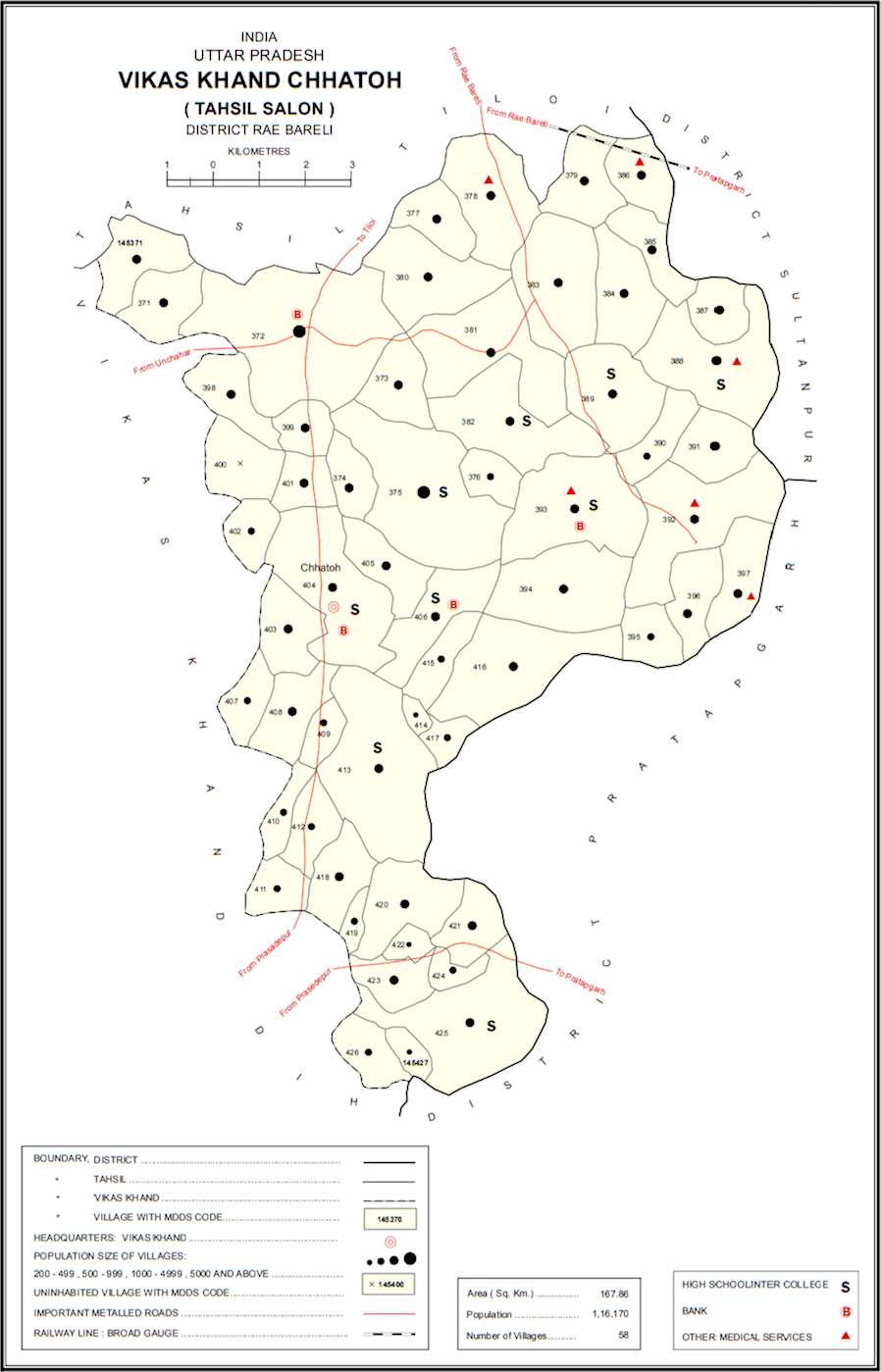
- Map showing Ninawan (#423) in Chhatoh CD block

- Location in Uttar Pradesh, India
- Coordinates: 26.078779°N 81.530707°E
- Country India: India
- State: Uttar Pradesh
- District: Raebareli

Area
  - Total: 0.436 km^{2} (0.168 sq mi)

Population (2011)
  - Total: 1,077
  - Density: 2,470/km^{2} (6,400/sq mi)

Languages
  - Official: Hindi
- Time zone: UTC+5:30 (IST)
- PIN: 229307
- Vehicle registration: UP-35

Ninawan is a village in Chhatoh block of Rae Bareli district, Uttar Pradesh, India. It is located 12 km from Salon, the tehsil headquarters. As of 2011, Ninawan has a population of 1,077 people, in 187 households. It has one primary school and no healthcare facilities. The village belongs to the nyaya panchayat of Bara.

The 1951 census recorded Ninawan as comprising 3 hamlets, with a total population of 349 people (165 male and 184 female), in 71 households and 68 physical houses. The area of the village was given as 396 acres. 18 residents were literate, all male. The village was listed as belonging to the pargana of Parshadepur and the thana of Salon.

The 1961 census recorded Ninawan as comprising 4 hamlets, with a total population of 412 people (204 male and 208 female), in 91 households and 91 physical houses. The area of the village was given as 396 acres.

The 1981 census recorded Ninawan (as "Ninawa") as having a population of 578 people, in 133 households, and having an area of 163.89 hectares. The main staple foods were listed as wheat and rice.

The 1991 census recorded Ninawan as having a total population of 799 people (403 male and 396 female), in 177 households and 158 physical houses. The area of the village was listed as 232 hectares. Members of the 0-6 age group numbered 196, or 24.5% of the total; this group was 53% male (103) and 47% female (93). Members of scheduled castes made up 40.8% of the village's population, while no members of scheduled tribes were recorded. The literacy rate of the village was 29% (164 men and 71 women). 200 people were classified as main workers (177 men and 23 women), while 16 people were classified as marginal workers (1 man and 15 women); the remaining 583 residents were non-workers. The breakdown of main workers by employment category was as follows: 99 cultivators (i.e. people who owned or leased their own land); 48 agricultural labourers (i.e. people who worked someone else's land in return for payment); 2 workers in livestock, forestry, fishing, hunting, plantations, orchards, etc.; 0 in mining and quarrying; 0 household industry workers; 35 workers employed in other manufacturing, processing, service, and repair roles; 0 construction workers; 0 employed in trade and commerce; 0 employed in transport, storage, and communications; and 16 in other services.
