= Barkhurdarpur =

Barkhurdarpur Barkhurdārpur
- Village
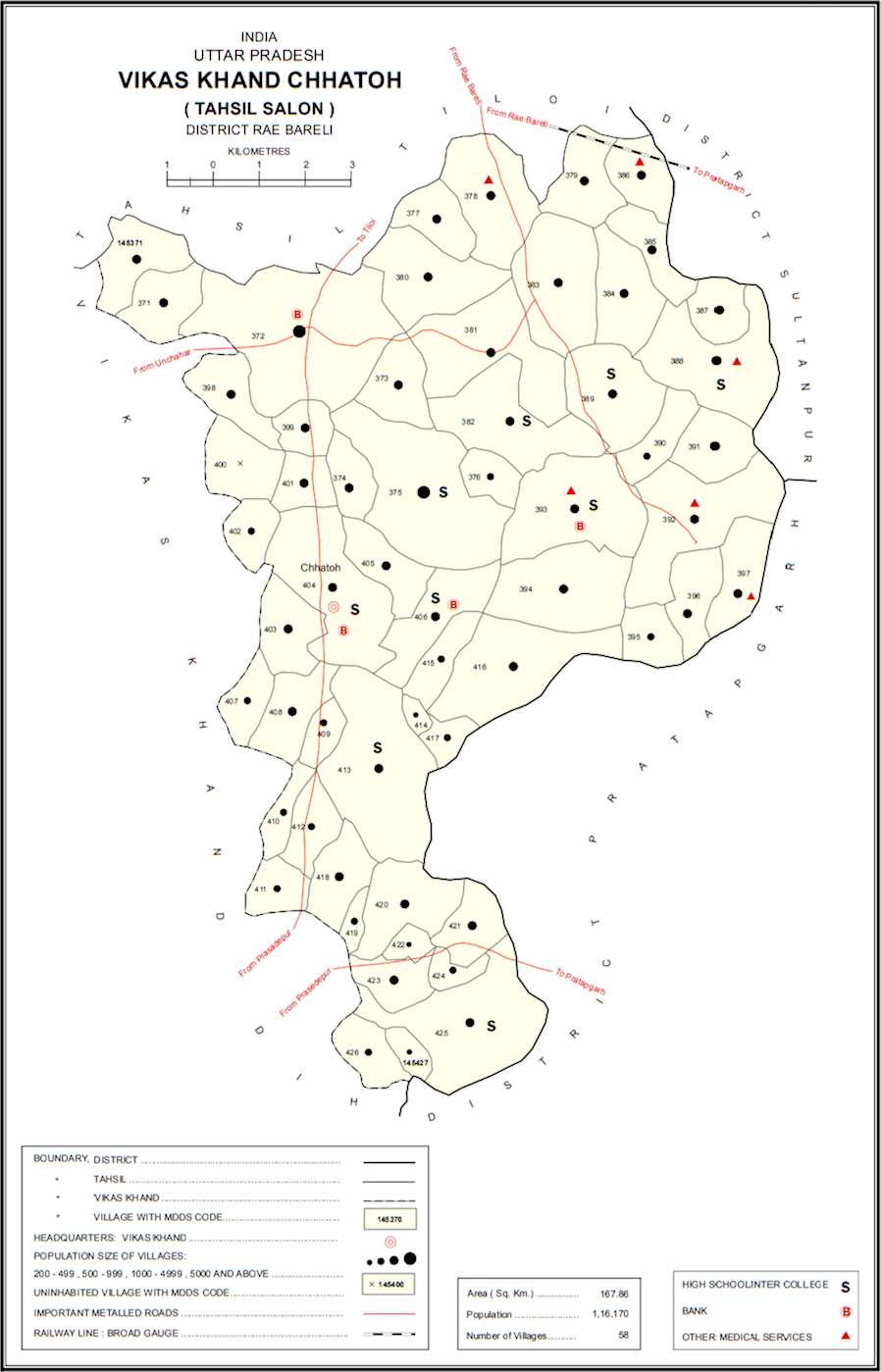
- Map showing Barkhurdarpur(#377) in Chhatoh CD block

- Location in Uttar Pradesh, India
- Coordinates: 26.230508°N 81.539953°E
- Country India: India
- State: Uttar Pradesh
- District: Raebareli

Area
  - Total: 1.771 km^{2} (0.684 sq mi)

Population (2011)
  - Total: 1,642
  - Density: 927.2/km^{2} (2,401/sq mi)

Languages
  - Official: Hindi
- Time zone: UTC+5:30 (IST)
- PIN: 229307
- Vehicle registration: UP-35

Barkhurdarpur is a village in Chhatoh block of Rae Bareli district, Uttar Pradesh, India. It is located 12 km from Jais, the nearest town. As of 2011, Barkhurdarpur has a population of 1,642 people, in 299 households. It has one primary school and no healthcare facilities. It belongs to the nyaya panchayat of Ashrafpur.

The 1951 census recorded Barkhurdarpur as comprising 1 hamlet, with a total population of 668 people (317 male and 351 female), in 159 households and 154 physical houses. The area of the village was given as 442 acres. 21 residents were literate, all male. The village was listed as belonging to the pargana of Rokha and the thana of Nasirabad.

The 1961 census recorded Barkhurdarpur as comprising 1 hamlet, with a total population of 733 people (347 male and 386 female), in 155 households and 149 physical houses. The area of the village was given as 442 acres and it had a post office at that point.

The 1981 census recorded Barkhurdarpur as having a population of 1,043 people, in 300 households, and having an area of 178.87 hectares. The main staple foods were listed as wheat and rice.

The 1991 census recorded Barkhurdarpur as having a total population of 1,428 people (747 male and 681 female), in 230 households and 230 physical houses. The area of the village was listed as 179 hectares. Members of the 0-6 age group numbered 273, or 19.1% of the total; this group was 53% male (145) and 47% female (128). Members of scheduled castes made up 12.5% of the village's population, while no members of scheduled tribes were recorded. The literacy rate of the village was 19% (256 men and 27 women). 603 people were classified as main workers (434 men and 169 women), while 5 people were classified as marginal workers (all women); the remaining 820 residents were non-workers. The breakdown of main workers by employment category was as follows: 531 cultivators (i.e. people who owned or leased their own land); 4 agricultural labourers (i.e. people who worked someone else's land in return for payment); 2 workers in livestock, forestry, fishing, hunting, plantations, orchards, etc.; 0 in mining and quarrying; 2 household industry workers; 25 workers employed in other manufacturing, processing, service, and repair roles; 0 construction workers; 11 employed in trade and commerce; 6 employed in transport, storage, and communications; and 22 in other services.
