= Birpur, Raebareli =

Birpur Bīrpur
- Village
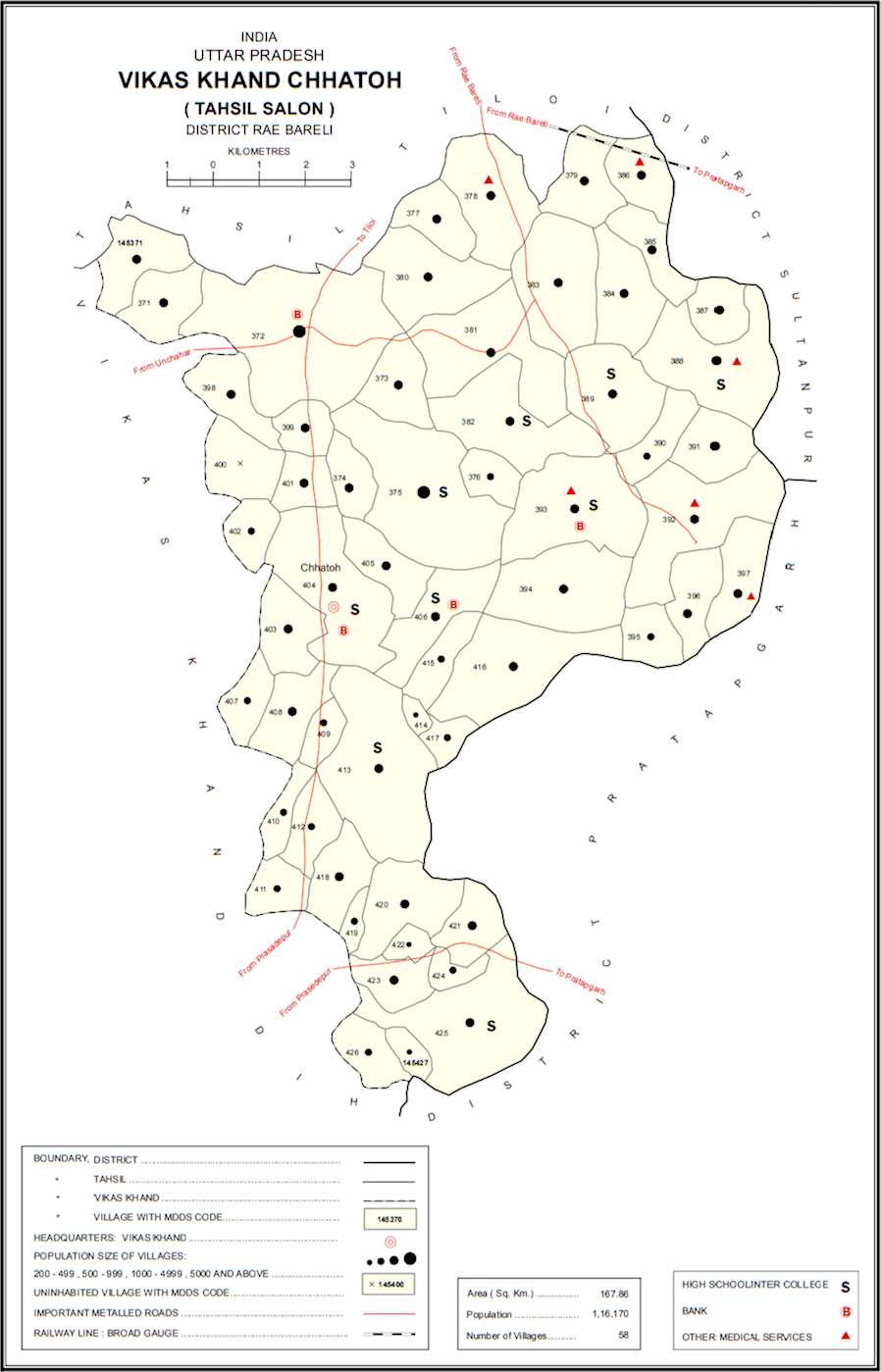
- Map showing Birpur (#422) in Chhatoh CD block

- Location in Uttar Pradesh, India
- Coordinates: 26.084773°N 81.530301°E
- Country: India
- State: Uttar Pradesh
- District: Raebareli

Area
  - Total: 0.344 km^{2} (0.133 sq mi)

Population (2011)
  - Total: 493
  - Density: 1,430/km^{2} (3,710/sq mi)

Languages
  - Official: Hindi
- Time zone: UTC+5:30 (IST)
- Vehicle registration: UP-35

Birpur is a village in Chhatoh block of Rae Bareli district, Uttar Pradesh, India. It is located 9 km from Salon, which is the tehsil headquarters. As of 2011, Birpur has a population of 493 people, in 103 households. It has no schools and no healthcare facilities, and it does not host a permanent market or a weekly haat. It belongs to the nyaya panchayat of Bara.

The 1951 census recorded Birpur as comprising 2 hamlets, with a total population of 296 people (149 male and 147 female), in 73 households and 70 physical houses. The area of the village was given as 186 acres. 7 residents were literate, all male. The village was listed as belonging to the pargana of Parshadepur and the thana of Salon. As of that year, Birpur had a primary school with 32 students.

The 1961 census recorded Birpur as comprising 2 hamlets, with a total population of 476 people (215 male and 261 female), in 66 households and 56 physical houses. The area of the village was given as 186 acres.

The 1981 census recorded Birpur as having a population of 328 people, in 97 households, and having an area of 75.68 hectares. The main staple foods were listed as wheat and rice.

The 1991 census recorded Birpur as having a total population of 403 people (205 male and 198 female), in 93 households and 92 physical houses. The area of the village was listed as 71 hectares. Members of the 0-6 age group numbered 105, or 26.1% of the total; this group was 52% male (55) and 48% female (50). Members of scheduled castes made up 26.1% of the village's population, while no members of scheduled tribes were recorded. The literacy rate of the village was 19% (71 men and 4 women). 97 people were classified as main workers (90 men and 7 women), while 0 people were classified as marginal workers; the remaining 306 residents were non-workers. The breakdown of main workers by employment category was as follows: 60 cultivators (i.e. people who owned or leased their own land); 31 agricultural labourers (i.e. people who worked someone else's land in return for payment); 0 workers in livestock, forestry, fishing, hunting, plantations, orchards, etc.; 0 in mining and quarrying; 0 household industry workers; 2 workers employed in other manufacturing, processing, service, and repair roles; 0 construction workers; 1 employed in trade and commerce; 0 employed in transport, storage, and communications; and 3 in other services.
