= Abdu Mau =

Abdu Mau Abdumau
- Village
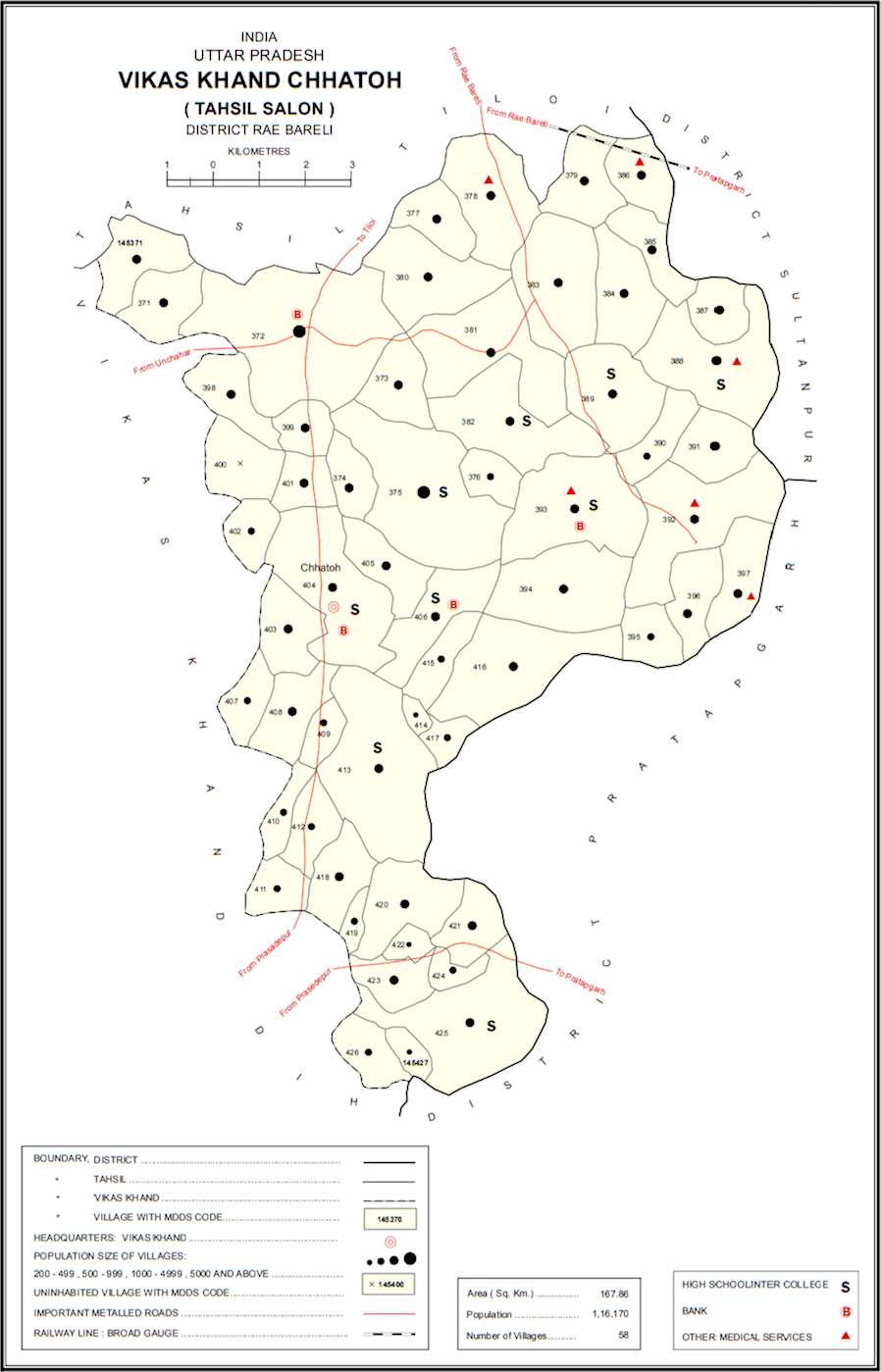
- Map showing Abdu Mau (#391) in Chhatoh CD block

- Location in Uttar Pradesh, India
- Coordinates: 26.189893°N 81.602565°E
- Country India: India
- State: Uttar Pradesh
- District: Raebareli

Area
  - Total: 2.882 km^{2} (1.113 sq mi)

Population (2011)
  - Total: 1,339
  - Density: 464.6/km^{2} (1,203/sq mi)

Languages
  - Official: Hindi
- Time zone: UTC+5:30 (IST)
- PIN: 229307
- Vehicle registration: UP-35

Abdu Mau, also spelled Abdumau, is a village in Chhatoh block of Rae Bareli district, Uttar Pradesh, India. It is located 48 km from Raebareli, the district headquarters. As of 2011, the village has a population of 1,339 people, in 213 households. It has one primary school and no healthcare facilities. It belongs to the nyaya panchayat of Paraiya Namaksar.

The 1951 census recorded Abdu Mau as comprising 4 hamlets, with a total population of 346 people (181 male and 165 female), in 97 households and 97 physical houses. The area of the village was given as 599 acres. 2 residents were literate, both male. The village was listed as belonging to the pargana of Rokha and the thana of Nasirabad.

The 1961 census recorded Abdu Mau (as "Abdumau") as comprising 4 hamlets, with a total population of 499 people (248 male and 251 female), in 110 households and 110 physical houses. The area of the village was given as 599 acres.

The 1981 census recorded Abdu Mau (as "Abdumau") as having a population of 787 people, in 189 households, and having an area of 237.95 hectares. The main staple foods were listed as wheat and rice.

The 1991 census recorded Abdu Mau as having a total population of 915 people (444 male and 471 female), in 170 households and 170 physical houses. The area of the village was listed as 237 hectares. Members of the 0-6 age group numbered 233, or 25.5% of the total; this group was 58% male (135) and 42% female (98). Members of scheduled castes made up 27.8% of the village's population, while no members of scheduled tribes were recorded. The literacy rate of the village was 15% (131 men and 9 women). 263 people were classified as main workers (226 men and 37 women), while 0 people were classified as marginal workers; the remaining 652 residents were non-workers. The breakdown of main workers by employment category was as follows: 236 cultivators (i.e. people who owned or leased their own land); 19 agricultural labourers (i.e. people who worked someone else's land in return for payment); 0 workers in livestock, forestry, fishing, hunting, plantations, orchards, etc.; 0 in mining and quarrying; 0 household industry workers; 0 workers employed in other manufacturing, processing, service, and repair roles; 0 construction workers; 0 employed in trade and commerce; 3 employed in transport, storage, and communications; and 5 in other services.
