= Digha (disambiguation) =

Digha is a seaside resort town in West Bengal, India

Digha may also refer to:

- Digha, Nadia, a census town in Nadia district, West Bengal
- Digha, Navi Mumbai, a township near Airoli in Navi Mumbai, India
- Digha, North 24 Parganas, a census town in North 24 Parganas district, West Bengal, India
- Digha, Patna, a neighbourhood in Patna, Bihar, India
  - Digha Assembly constituency, a constituency of the Bihar Legislative Assembly
  - Digha–Sonpur Bridge, a rail and road bridge across the Ganges in Saran district, Bihar, India
- Digha, Raebareli, a village in Raebareli district, Uttar Pradesh, India
- Dīgha Nikāya, the first Buddhist scripture collection in the Pāli Canon
