= Barawan =

Barawan Barāwān
- Village
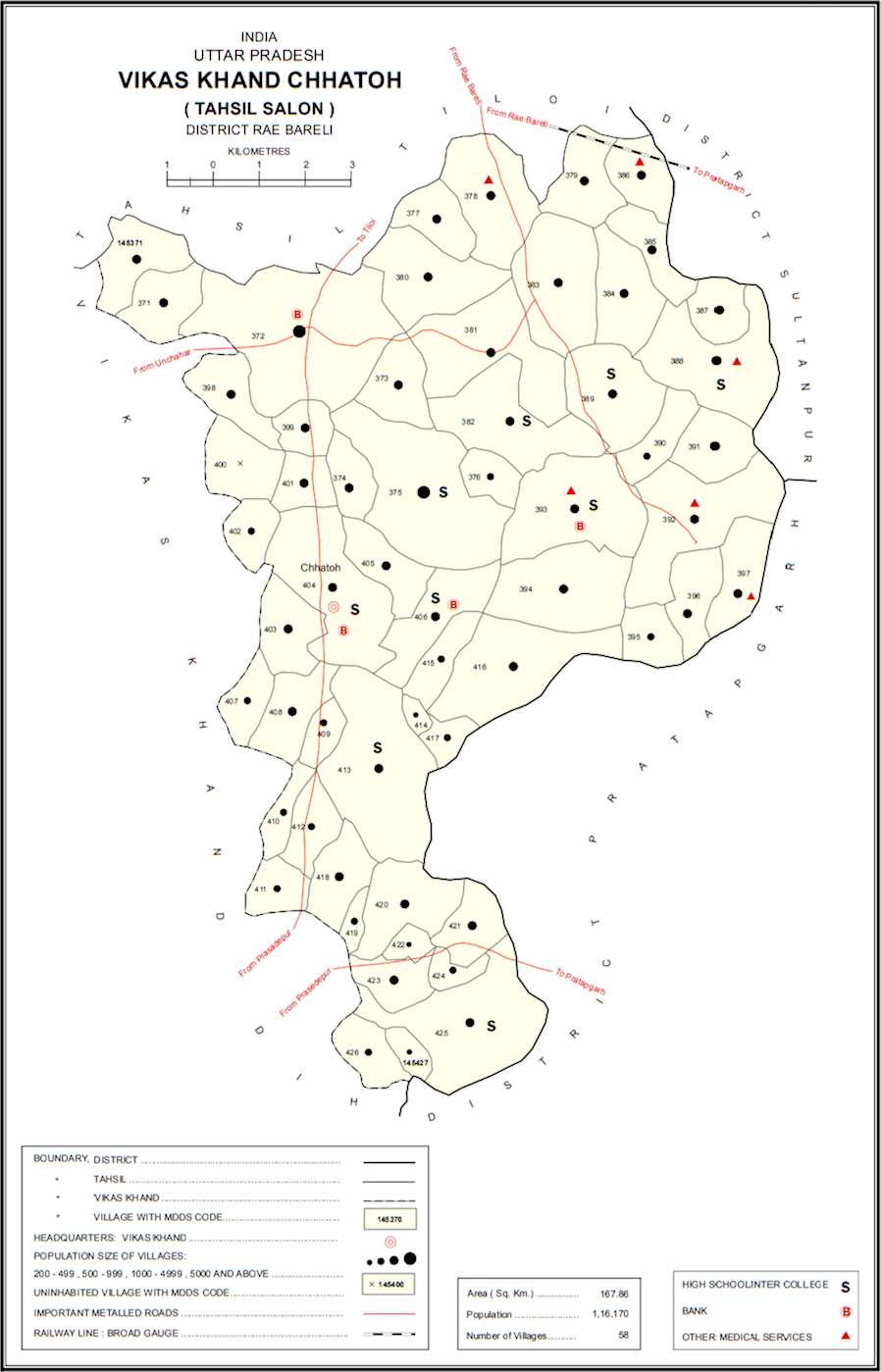
- Map showing Barawan (#420) in Chhatoh CD block

- Location in Uttar Pradesh, India
- Coordinates: 26.090187°N 81.527915°E
- Country India: India
- State: Uttar Pradesh
- District: Raebareli

Area
  - Total: 2.871 km^{2} (1.108 sq mi)

Population (2011)
  - Total: 1,391
  - Density: 484.5/km^{2} (1,255/sq mi)

Languages
  - Official: Hindi
- Time zone: UTC+5:30 (IST)
- PIN: 229307
- Vehicle registration: UP-35

Barawan is a village in Chhatoh block of Rae Bareli district, Uttar Pradesh, India. It is located 9 km from Salon, the tehsil headquarters. As of 2011, Barawan has a population of 1,391 people, in 270 households. It has one primary school but no healthcare facilities. It belongs to the nyaya panchayat of Bara.

The 1951 census recorded Barawan as comprising 5 hamlets, with a population of 522 people (269 male and 253 female), in 127 households and 112 physical houses. The area of the village was given as 702 acres. 8 residents were literate, all male. The village was listed as belonging to the pargana of Parshadepur and the thana of Salon.

The 1961 census recorded Barawan as comprising 6 hamlets, with a total population of 620 people (322 male and 298 female), in 128 households and 112 physical houses. The area of the village was given as 702 acres.

The 1981 census recorded Barawan as having a population of 837 people, in 188 households, and having an area of 290.56 hectares. The main staple foods were listed as wheat and rice.

The 1991 census recorded Barawan as having a total population of 946 people (488 male and 458 female), in 204 households and 204 physical houses. The area of the village was listed as 240 hectares. Members of the 0-6 age group numbered 192, or 20.3% of the total; this group was 52% male (99) and 48% female (93). Members of scheduled castes made up 21.5% of the village's population, while no members of scheduled tribes were recorded. The literacy rate of the village was 19% (146 men and 31 women). 325 people were classified as main workers (250 men and 75 women), while 192 people were classified as marginal workers (all women); the remaining 429 residents were non-workers. The breakdown of main workers by employment category was as follows: 102 cultivators (i.e. people who owned or leased their own land); 213 agricultural labourers (i.e. people who worked someone else's land in return for payment); 1 worker in livestock, forestry, fishing, hunting, plantations, orchards, etc.; 0 in mining and quarrying; 0 household industry workers; 3 workers employed in other manufacturing, processing, service, and repair roles; 1 construction worker; 1 employed in trade and commerce; 0 employed in transport, storage, and communications; and 3 in other services.
