= Itraura =

Itraura Itrāura
- Village
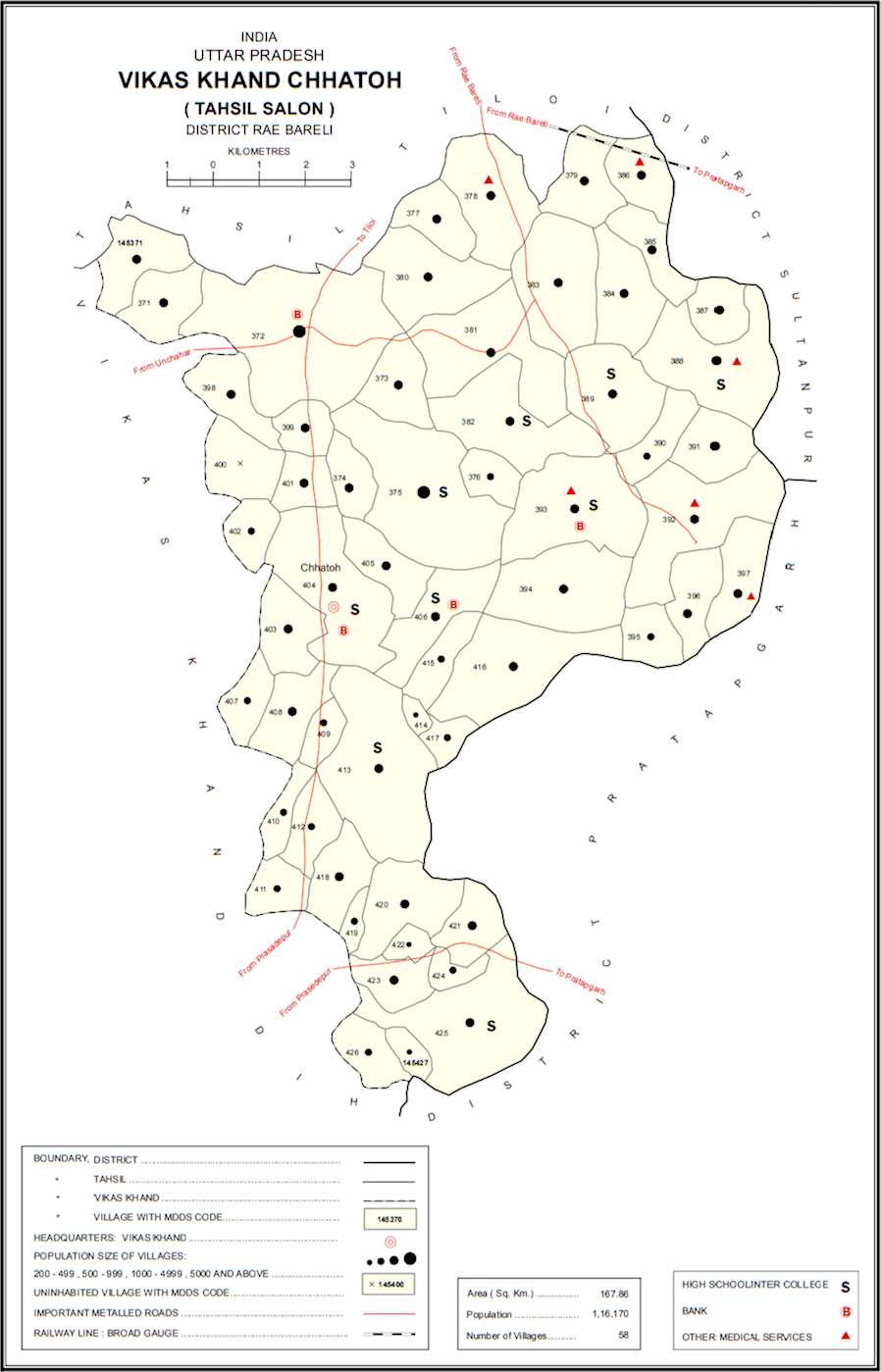
- Map showing Itraura (#390) in Chhatoh CD block

- Location in Uttar Pradesh, India
- Coordinates: 26.184153°N 81.581989°E
- Country India: India
- State: Uttar Pradesh
- District: Raebareli

Area
  - Total: 1.823 km^{2} (0.704 sq mi)

Population (2011)
  - Total: 670
  - Density: 370/km^{2} (950/sq mi)

Languages
  - Official: Hindi
- Time zone: UTC+5:30 (IST)
- Vehicle registration: UP-35

Itraura is a village in Chhatoh block of Rae Bareli district, Uttar Pradesh, India. It is located 47 km from Raebareli, the district headquarters. As of 2011, Itraura has a population of 670 people, in 120 households. It has one primary school and no healthcare facilities. It belongs to the nyaya panchayat of Paraiya Namaksar.

The 1951 census recorded Itraura (as "Itaura") as comprising 3 hamlets, with a total population of 248 people (133 male and 115 female), in 62 households and 59 physical houses. The area of the village was given as 486 acres. 23 residents were literate, all male. The village was listed as belonging to the pargana of Rokha and the thana of Nasirabad.

The 1961 census recorded Itraura as comprising 3 hamlets, with a total population of 299 people (150 male and 149 female), in 75 households and 66 physical houses. The area of the village was given as 396 acres.

The 1981 census recorded Itraura as having a population of 439 people, in 113 households, and having an area of 187.37 hectares. The main staple foods were listed as wheat and rice.

The 1991 census recorded Itraura as having a total population of 516 people (267 male and 249 female), in 102 households and 102 physical houses. The area of the village was listed as 187 hectares. Members of the 0-6 age group numbered 90, or 17.4% of the total; this group was 59% male (53) and 41% female (37). Members of scheduled castes made up 31.8% of the village's population, while no members of scheduled tribes were recorded. The literacy rate of the village was 37% (132 men and 60 women). 187 people were classified as main workers (150 men and 37 women), while 96 people were classified as marginal workers (all women); the remaining 233 residents were non-workers. The breakdown of main workers by employment category was as follows: 186 cultivators (i.e. people who owned or leased their own land); 0 agricultural labourers (i.e. people who worked someone else's land in return for payment); 0 workers in livestock, forestry, fishing, hunting, plantations, orchards, etc.; 0 in mining and quarrying; 0 household industry workers; 0 workers employed in other manufacturing, processing, service, and repair roles; 0 construction workers; 0 employed in trade and commerce; 0 employed in transport, storage, and communications; and 1 in other services.
