= Sandaha =

Sandaha Sandāha
- Village
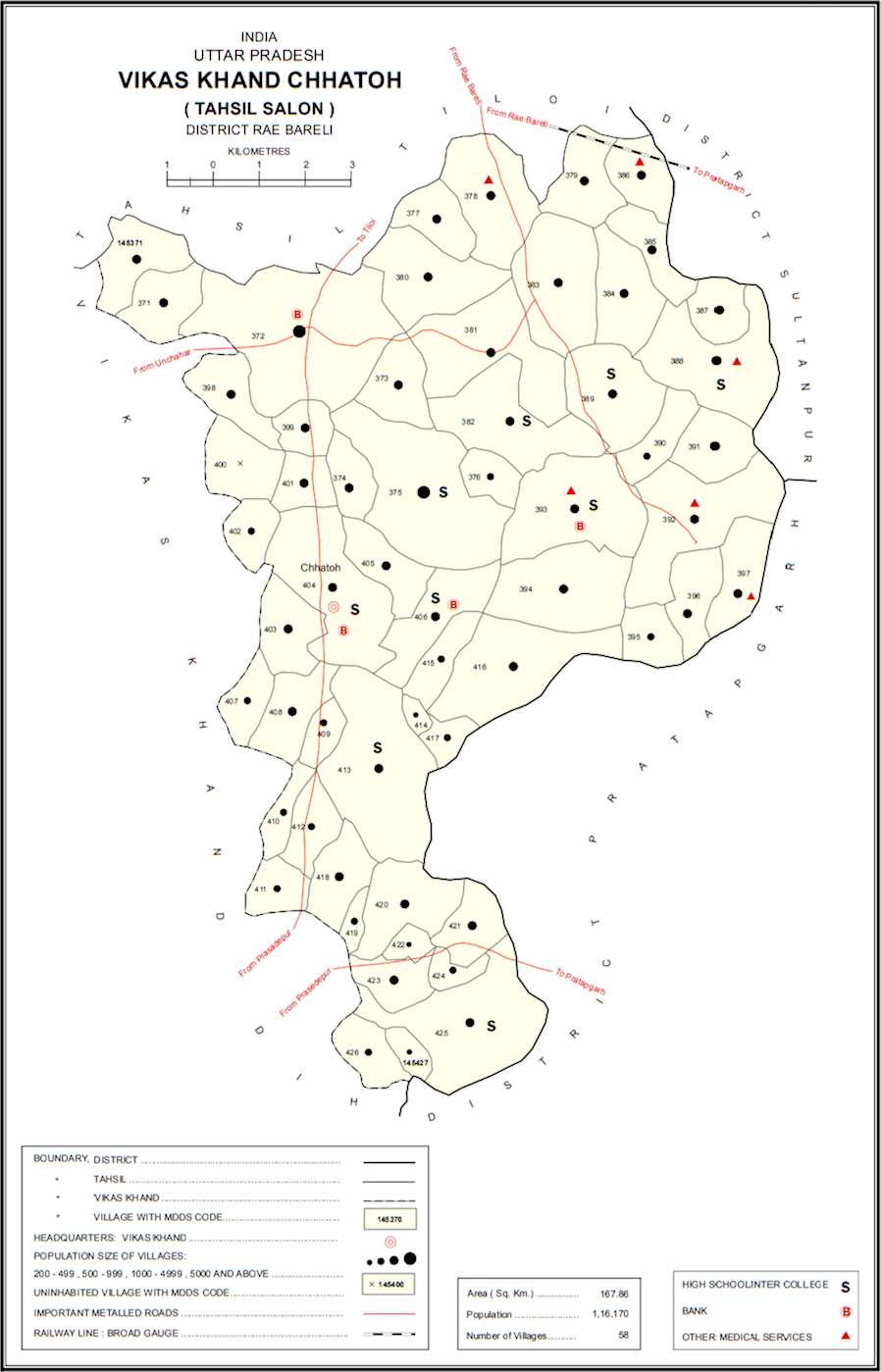
- Map showing Sandaha (#392) in Chhatoh CD block

- Location in Uttar Pradesh, India
- Coordinates: 26.168903°N 81.597179°E
- Country: India
- State: Uttar Pradesh
- District: Raebareli

Area
  - Total: 5.936 km^{2} (2.292 sq mi)

Population (2011)
  - Total: 4,145
  - Density: 698.3/km^{2} (1,809/sq mi)

Languages
  - Official: Hindi
- Time zone: UTC+5:30 (IST)
- Vehicle registration: UP-35

Sandaha is a village in Chhatoh block of Rae Bareli district, Uttar Pradesh, India. It is located 48 km from Raebareli, the district headquarters. As of 2011, Sandaha has a population of 4,145 people, in 764 households. It belongs to the nyaya panchayat of Paraiya Namaksar.

== Demographics ==
The 1951 census recorded Sandaha as comprising 18 hamlets, with a total population of 1,256 people (655 male and 601 female), in 325 households and 301 physical houses. The area of the village was given as 1,550 acres. 14 residents were literate, all male. The village was listed as belonging to the pargana of Rokha and the thana of Nasirabad.

The 1961 census recorded Sandaha as comprising 19 hamlets, with a total population of 1,577 people (810 male and 767 female), in 329 households and 316 physical houses. The area of the village was given as 1,550 acres.

The 1981 census recorded Sandaha as having a population of 2,264 people, in 626 households, and having an area of 509.10 hectares. The main staple foods were listed as wheat and rice.

The 1991 census recorded Sandaha as having a total population of 2,420 people (1,218 male and 1,202 female), in 537 households and 533 physical houses. The area of the village was listed as 387 hectares. Members of the 0-6 age group numbered 442, or 18.3% of the total; this group was 50% male (222) and 50% female (220). Members of scheduled castes made up 33.7% of the village's population, while no members of scheduled tribes were recorded. The literacy rate of the village was 17% (354 men and 67 women).

788 people were classified as main workers (648 men and 140 women), while 48 people were classified as marginal workers (all women); the remaining 1,584 residents were non-workers. The breakdown of main workers by employment category was as follows: 628 cultivators (i.e. people who owned or leased their own land); 137 agricultural labourers (i.e. people who worked someone else's land in return for payment); 2 household industry workers; 4 workers employed in other manufacturing, processing, service, and repair roles; 2 employed in trade and commerce; and 15 in other services.
