= Basupur =

Basupur Bāsupur
- Village
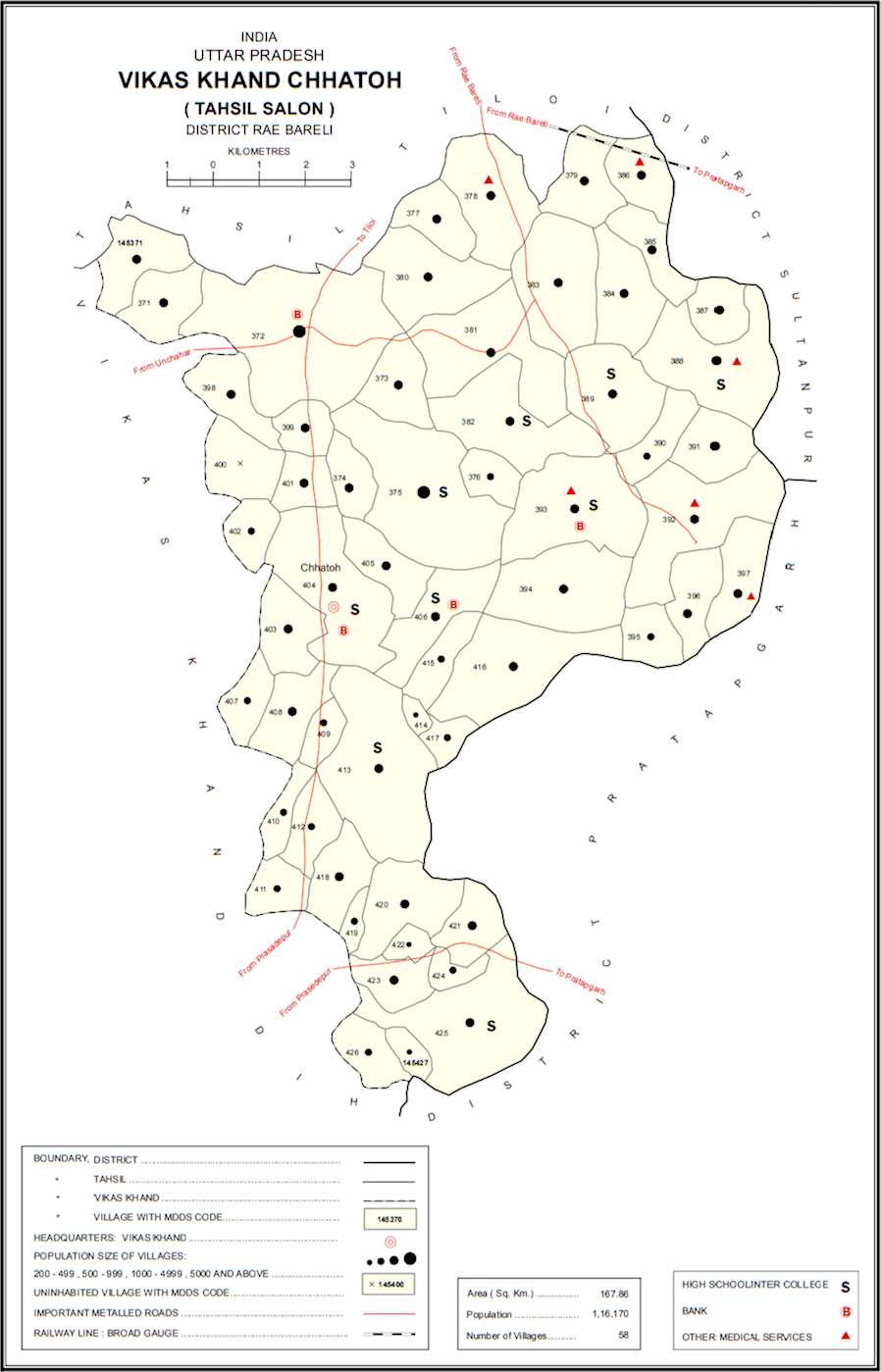
- Map showing Basupur (#402) in Chhatoh CD block

- Location in Uttar Pradesh, India
- Coordinates: 26.166803°N 81.495966°E
- Country: India
- State: Uttar Pradesh
- District: Raebareli

Area
  - Total: 1.282 km^{2} (0.495 sq mi)

Population (2011)
  - Total: 902
  - Density: 704/km^{2} (1,820/sq mi)

Languages
  - Official: Hindi
- Time zone: UTC+5:30 (IST)
- Vehicle registration: UP-33

Basupur is a village in Chhatoh block of Rae Bareli district, Uttar Pradesh, India. It is located 32 km from Raebareli, the district headquarters. As of 2011, Basupur has a population of 902 people, in 184 households. It has one primary school and no healthcare facilities, and it does not host a permanent market or a weekly haat. It belongs to the nyaya panchayat of Chhatoh.

The 1951 census recorded Basupur as comprising 4 hamlets, with a total population of 417 people (230 male and 187 female), in 98 households and 89 physical houses. The area of the village was given as 329 acres. 4 residents were literate, all male. The village was listed as belonging to the pargana of Rokha and the thana of Nasirabad.

The 1961 census recorded Basupur as comprising 4 hamlets, with a total population of 452 people (210 male and 242 female), in 113 households and 113 physical houses. The area of the village was given as 329 acres.

The 1981 census recorded Basupur as having a population of 519 people, in 115 households, and having an area of 133.34 hectares. The main staple foods were listed as wheat and rice.

The 1991 census recorded Basupur as having a total population of 613 people (309 male and 304 female), in 154 households and 154 physical houses. The area of the village was listed as 232 hectares. Members of the 0-6 age group numbered 120, or 19.6% of the total; this group was 46% male (55) and 54% female (65). Members of scheduled castes made up 36.5% of the village's population, while no members of scheduled tribes were recorded. The literacy rate of the village was 13% (76 men and 6 women). 162 people were classified as main workers (149 men and 13 women), while 20 people were classified as marginal workers (all women); the remaining 431 residents were non-workers. The breakdown of main workers by employment category was as follows: 123 cultivators (i.e. people who owned or leased their own land); 38 agricultural labourers (i.e. people who worked someone else's land in return for payment); 0 workers in livestock, forestry, fishing, hunting, plantations, orchards, etc.; 0 in mining and quarrying; 0 household industry workers; 0 workers employed in other manufacturing, processing, service, and repair roles; 0 construction workers; 0 employed in trade and commerce; 0 employed in transport, storage, and communications; and 3 in other services.
