= Kukha =

- Village
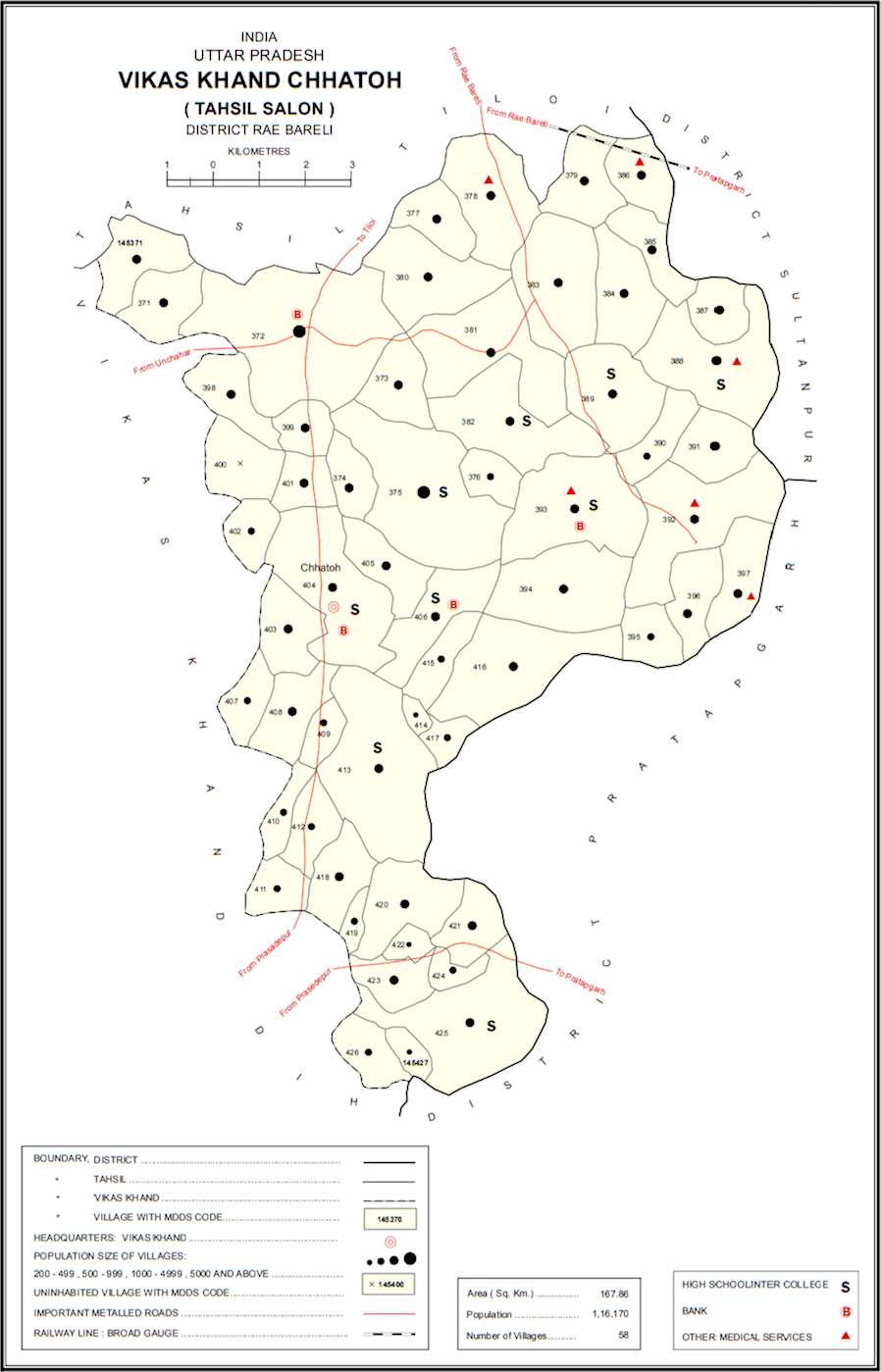
- Map showing Kukha (#400) in Chhatoh CD block

- Location in Uttar Pradesh, India
- Coordinates: 26.186272°N 81.496482°E
- Country: India
- State: Uttar Pradesh
- District: Raebareli

Area
  - Total: 2.847 km^{2} (1.099 sq mi)

Population (2011)
  - Total: 1,643
  - Density: 577.1/km^{2} (1,495/sq mi)

Languages
  - Official: Hindi
- Time zone: UTC+5:30 (IST)
- Vehicle registration: UP-35

Kukha is a village in Chhatoh block of Rae Bareli district, Uttar Pradesh, India. It is located 36 km from Raebareli, the district headquarters. As of 2011, Kukha has a population of 1,643 people, in 354 households. It has one primary school and no healthcare facilities, and it does not host a permanent market or a weekly haat. It belongs to the nyaya panchayat of Chhatoh.

The 1951 census recorded Kukha (as "Kokha") as comprising 5 hamlets, with a total population of 574 people (298 male and 276 female), in 138 households and 129 physical houses. The area of the village was given as 690 acres. 9 residents were literate, all male. The village was listed as belonging to the pargana of Rokha and the thana of Nasirabad.

The 1961 census recorded Kukha (as "Kokaha") as comprising 4 hamlets, with a total population of 680 people (353 male and 327 female), in 147 households and 145 physical houses. The area of the village was given as 690 acres.

The 1981 census recorded Kukha (as "Kukaha") as having a population of 830 people, in 213 households, and having an area of 279.23 hectares. The main staple foods were listed as wheat and rice.

The 1991 census recorded Kukha as having a total population of 1,177 people (596 male and 581 female), in 232 households and 228 physical houses. The area of the village was listed as 254 hectares. Members of the 0-6 age group numbered 219, or 18.6% of the total; this group was 56% male (122) and 44% female (97). Members of scheduled castes made up 43.8% of the village's population, while no members of scheduled tribes were recorded. The literacy rate of the village was 21% (199 men and 46 women). 362 people were classified as main workers (314 men and 48 women), while 0 people were classified as marginal workers; the remaining 835 residents were non-workers. The breakdown of main workers by employment category was as follows: 315 cultivators (i.e. people who owned or leased their own land); 28 agricultural labourers (i.e. people who worked someone else's land in return for payment); 1 worker in livestock, forestry, fishing, hunting, plantations, orchards, etc.; 0 in mining and quarrying; 0 household industry workers; 2 workers employed in other manufacturing, processing, service, and repair roles; 0 construction workers; 2 employed in trade and commerce; 0 employed in transport, storage, and communications; and 14 in other services.
