= Chhatoh =

- Village
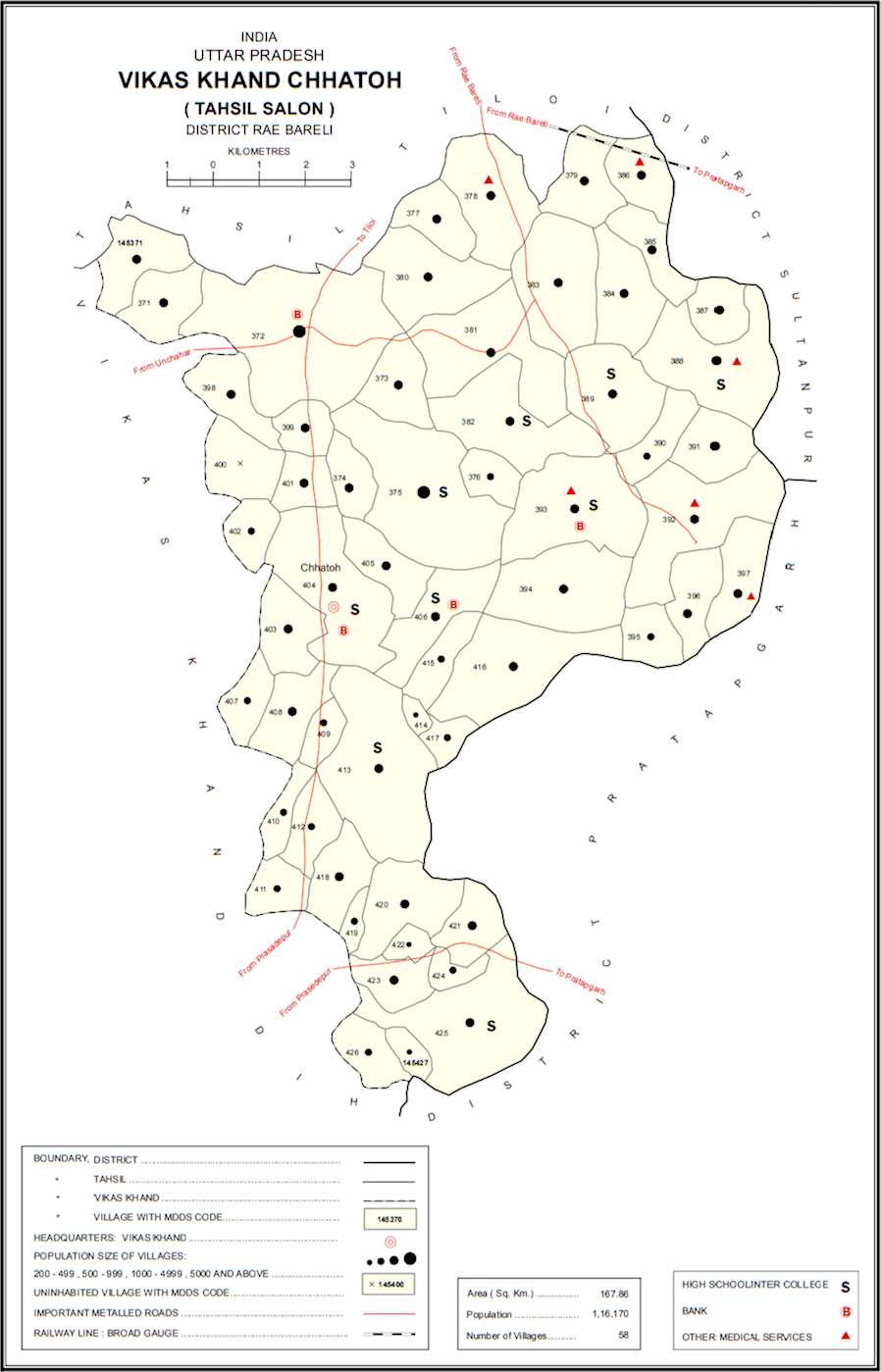
- Map of Chhatoh CD block

- Location in Uttar Pradesh, India
- Coordinates: 26.163419°N 81.518467°E
- Country India: India
- State: Uttar Pradesh
- District: Raebareli

Area
  - Total: 6.067 km^{2} (2.342 sq mi)

Population (2011)
  - Total: 3,999
  - Density: 659.1/km^{2} (1,707/sq mi)

Languages
  - Official: Hindi
- Time zone: UTC+5:30 (IST)
- PIN: 229307
- Vehicle registration: UP-35

Chhatoh is a village and corresponding community development block in Salon tehsil of Rae Bareli district, Uttar Pradesh, India. It is located 43 km from Raebareli, the district headquarters. As of 2011, Chhatoh has a population of 3,999 people, in 749 households. It has 3 primary schools and one veterinary hospital but no healthcare facilities for humans. In addition to being the block headquarters, Chhatoh is also the headquarters of a nyaya panchayat that includes 8 other villages.

The 1951 census recorded Chhatoh as comprising 10 hamlets, with a total population of 1,386 people (682 male and 704 female), in 343 households and 341 physical houses. The area of the village was given as 1,569 acres. 28 residents were literate, 26 male and 2 female. The village was listed as belonging to the pargana of Rokha and the thana of Mustafabad.

The 1961 census recorded Chhatoh as comprising 14 hamlets, with a total population of 1,569 people (770 male and 799 female), in 396 households and 359 physical houses. The area of the village was given as 1,569 acres and it had access to electricity at that point.

The 1981 census recorded Chhatoh as having a population of 2,060 people, in 581 households, and having an area of 613.51 hectares. The main staple foods were listed as wheat and rice.

The 1991 census recorded Chhatoh as having a total population of 2,527 people (1,250 male and 1,277 female), in 556 households and 556 physical houses. The area of the village was listed as 613 hectares. Members of the 0-6 age group numbered 518, or 20.5% of the total; this group was 50% male (257) and 50% female (261). Members of scheduled castes made up 40.4% of the village's population, while no members of scheduled tribes were recorded. The literacy rate of the village was 19% (415 men and 63 women). 765 people were classified as main workers (662 men and 103 women), while 277 people were classified as marginal workers (3 men and 274 women); the remaining 1,485 residents were non-workers. The breakdown of main workers by employment category was as follows: 574 cultivators (i.e. people who owned or leased their own land); 149 agricultural labourers (i.e. people who worked someone else's land in return for payment); 0 workers in livestock, forestry, fishing, hunting, plantations, orchards, etc.; 0 in mining and quarrying; 2 household industry workers; 2 workers employed in other manufacturing, processing, service, and repair roles; 0 construction workers; 3 employed in trade and commerce; 0 employed in transport, storage, and communications; and 35 in other services.

== Villages ==
Chhatoh CD block has the following 58 villages:

Village name	Total land area (hectares)	Population (in 2011)
Jamalpr Hurayya	187.4	1,363
Mahmadpur Namaksar	260.4	1,580
Nasirabad	937.9	13,648
Bedhauna	184	1,392
Alampur	184	0
Kunwar Mau	736.7	5,184
Hari Rampur Tirra	70	502
Barkhurdarpur	177.1	1,642
Kazipur Teliyani	414.4	3,248
Sarain	254.2	1,776
Kolwa	342.8	2,224
Ashrafpur	512.5	4,918
Lahenga	515.6	3,297
Bheliya	454.8	3,000
Kanta	338.1	2,004
Hajipur	172.1	1,080
Bani	170.2	1,682
Tarapur	161.6	1,010
Kurha	555.8	3,412
Digha	463.5	1,536
Itraura	182.3	670
Abdu Mau	288.2	1,339
Sandaha	593.6	4,145
Paraiya Namaksar	529.4	4,506
Basanpur	426.1	3,678
Rajiyapur	171.5	957
Pure Rae	192.5	1,607
Makhdoompur	252.5	1,318
Lakhapur	232.4	2,490
Kondari	139.6	1,182
Kukha	284.7	1,643
Chaturpur	151.5	1,618
Basupur	128.2	902
Kapoorpur	567	1,615
Chhatoh (block headquarters)	606.7	3,999
Medapur	211.6	1,728
Garha	342.7	2,060
Kanakpur	477.6	599
Chandawahipur	226.4	1,045
Pichhwariya	103.7	648
Sarai Doola	89.3	586
Gopalipur	132.5	886
Jagatpur	175.2	792
Bhuwalpur Sisni	739.6	3,291
Bishesherpur	42.9	369
Sujwariya	171.6	863
Bewal	711.7	2,781
Sulaipur	83.2	665
Padumpur	214.2	1,585
Dhanapur	36.8	695
Barawan	287.1	1,391
Dostpur Burhwara	61.5	1,006
Birpur	34.4	493
Ninawan	43.6	1,077
Pachhuwa Bara	29.6	647
Bara	523.2	3,578
Mahanandpur	115.2	590
Bhagawantpur	63.7	461
