= Kanta, Raebareli =

Kanta Kānta
- Village
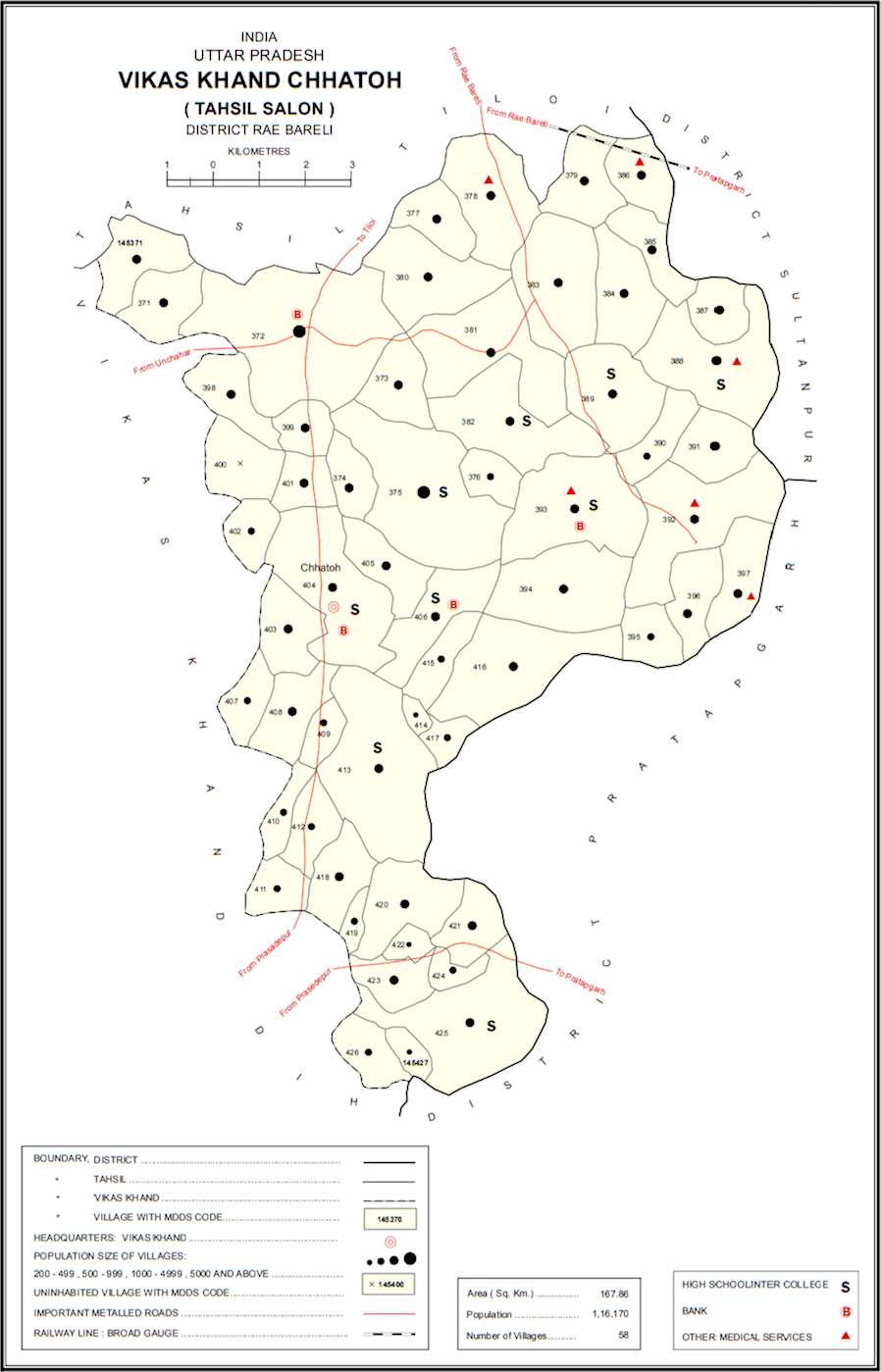
- Map showing Kanta (#384) in Chhatoh CD block

- Location in Uttar Pradesh, India
- Coordinates: 26.222731°N 81.579917°E
- Country: India
- State: Uttar Pradesh
- District: Raebareli

Area
  - Total: 3.381 km^{2} (1.305 sq mi)

Population (2011)
  - Total: 2,004
  - Density: 592.7/km^{2} (1,535/sq mi)

Languages
  - Official: Hindi
- Time zone: UTC+5:30 (IST)
- Vehicle registration: UP-35

Kanta is a village in Chhatoh block of Rae Bareli district, Uttar Pradesh, India. It is located 38 km from Raebareli, the district headquarters. As of 2011, Kanta has a population of 2,004 people, in 311 households. It has one primary school and no healthcare facilities, and it hosts a weekly haat but not a permanent market. It belongs to the nyaya panchayat of Hajipur.

The 1951 census recorded Kanta as comprising 8 hamlets, with a total population of 684 people (337 male and 347 female), in 138 households and 126 physical houses. The area of the village was given as 729 acres. 24 residents were literate, all male. The village was listed as belonging to the pargana of Rokha and the thana of Nasirabad.

The 1961 census recorded Kanta as comprising 8 hamlets, with a total population of 689 people (360 male and 329 female), in 138 households and 137 physical houses. The area of the village was given as 729 acres.

The 1981 census recorded Kanta as having a population of 1,042 people, in 230 households, and having an area of 287.33 hectares. The main staple foods were listed as wheat and rice.

The 1991 census recorded Kanta as having a total population of 1,282 people (672 male and 610 female), in 220 households and 219 physical houses. The area of the village was listed as 288 hectares. Members of the 0-6 age group numbered 238, or 18.6% of the total; this group was 50% male (118) and 50% female (120). Members of scheduled castes made up 26.9% of the village's population, while no members of scheduled tribes were recorded. The literacy rate of the village was 24% (253 men and 49 women). 347 people were classified as main workers (343 men and 4 women), while 0 people were classified as marginal workers; the remaining 935 residents were non-workers. The breakdown of main workers by employment category was as follows: 229 cultivators (i.e. people who owned or leased their own land); 107 agricultural labourers (i.e. people who worked someone else's land in return for payment); 0 workers in livestock, forestry, fishing, hunting, plantations, orchards, etc.; 0 in mining and quarrying; 0 household industry workers; 0 workers employed in other manufacturing, processing, service, and repair roles; 0 construction workers; 3 employed in trade and commerce; 0 employed in transport, storage, and communications; and 8 in other services.
