= Kapurpur, Raebareli =

Kapurpur Kapūrpur
- Village
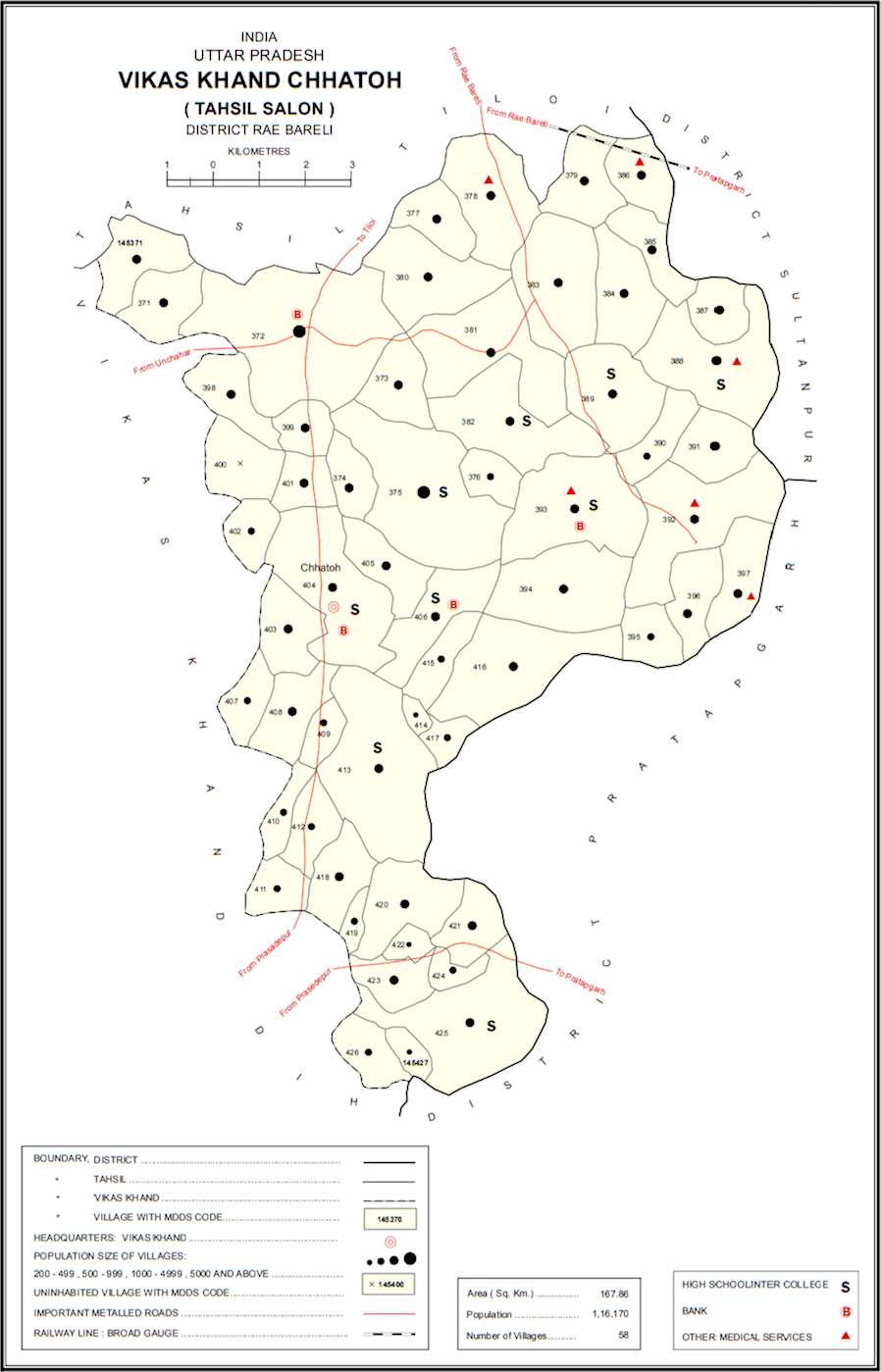
- Map showing Kapurpur (#403) in Chhatoh CD block

- Location in Uttar Pradesh, India
- Coordinates: 26.152243°N 81.505857°E
- Country: India
- State: Uttar Pradesh
- District: Raebareli

Area
  - Total: 5.67 km^{2} (2.19 sq mi)

Population (2011)
  - Total: 1,615
  - Density: 285/km^{2} (738/sq mi)

Languages
  - Official: Hindi
- Time zone: UTC+5:30 (IST)
- Vehicle registration: UP-35

Kapurpur is a village in Chhatoh block of Rae Bareli district, Uttar Pradesh, India. It is located 46 km from Raebareli, the district headquarters. As of 2011, Kapurpur has a population of 1,615 people, in 310 households. It has no schools and no healthcare facilities, and it does not host a permanent market or a weekly haat. It belongs to the nyaya panchayat of Chhatoh.

The 1951 census recorded Kapurpur (as "Kapoorpur") as comprising 4 hamlets, with a total population of 570 people (273 male and 297 female), in 127 households and 115 physical houses. The area of the village was given as 591 acres. 10 residents were literate (8 male and 2 female). The village was listed as belonging to the pargana of Rokha and the thana of Nasirabad.

The 1961 census recorded Kapurpur as comprising 3 hamlets, with a total population of 624 people (297 male and 327 female), in 143 households and 142 physical houses. The area of the village was given as 591 acres.

The 1981 census recorded Kapurpur (as "Kapoorpur") as having a population of 853 people, in 230 households, and having an area of 237.15 hectares. The main staple foods were listed as wheat and rice.

The 1991 census recorded Kapurpur (as "Kapoorpur") as having a total population of 982 people (484 male and 498 female), in 228 households and 228 physical houses. The area of the village was listed as 237 hectares. Members of the 0-6 age group numbered 182, or 18.5% of the total; this group was 52% male (95) and 48% female (87). Members of scheduled castes made up 50.2% of the village's population, while no members of scheduled tribes were recorded. The literacy rate of the village was 15% (128 men and 18 women). 254 people were classified as main workers (240 men and 14 women), while 0 people were classified as marginal workers; the remaining 728 residents were non-workers. The breakdown of main workers by employment category was as follows: 123 cultivators (i.e. people who owned or leased their own land); 118 agricultural labourers (i.e. people who worked someone else's land in return for payment); 3 workers in livestock, forestry, fishing, hunting, plantations, orchards, etc.; 0 in mining and quarrying; 6 household industry workers; 0 workers employed in other manufacturing, processing, service, and repair roles; 0 construction workers; 0 employed in trade and commerce; 0 employed in transport, storage, and communications; and 4 in other services.
