= Kunwarmau =

- Village
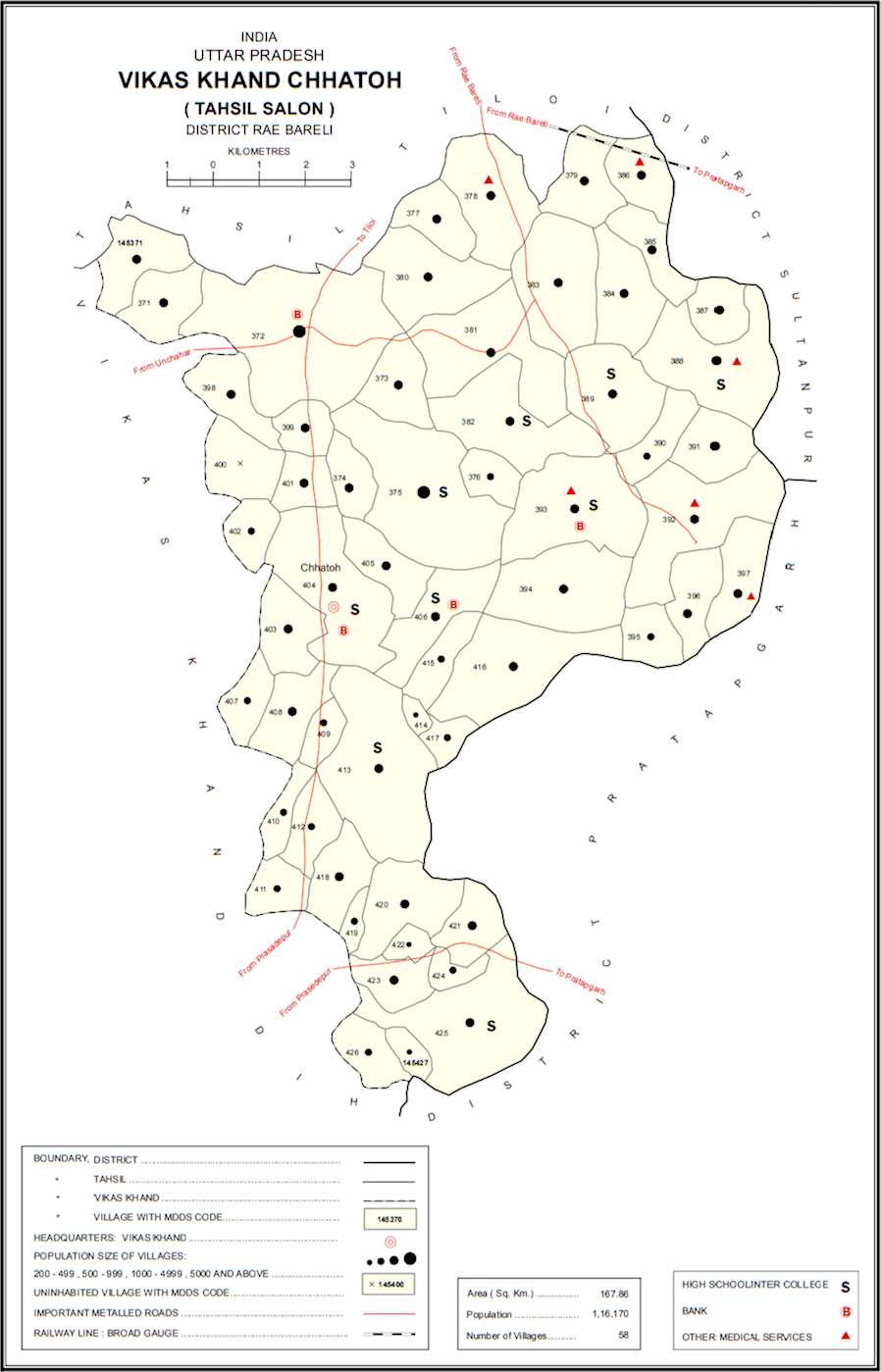
- Map showing Kunwarmau (#375) in Chhatoh CD block

- Location in Uttar Pradesh, India
- Coordinates: 26.174955°N 81.532562°E
- Country India: India
- State: Uttar Pradesh
- District: Raebareli

Area
  - Total: 7.367 km^{2} (2.844 sq mi)

Population (2011)
  - Total: 5,184
  - Density: 703.7/km^{2} (1,823/sq mi)

Languages
  - Official: Hindi
- Time zone: UTC+5:30 (IST)
- Vehicle registration: UP-35

Kunwarmau is a village in Chhatoh block of Rae Bareli district, Uttar Pradesh, India. It is located 11 km from Jais, the nearest large town. As of 2011, Kunwarmau has a population of 5,184 people, in 992 households. It has one primary school and no healthcare facilities.

The 1951 census recorded Kunwarmau (as "Kunwar Mau") as comprising 30 hamlets, with a total population of 2,278 people (1,186 male and 1,092 female), in 494 households and 448 physical houses. The area of the village was given as 1,540 acres. 129 residents were literate, all male. The village was listed as belonging to the pargana of Rokha and the thana of Nasirabad.

The 1961 census recorded Kunwarmau as comprising 26 hamlets, with a total population of 2,420 people (1,121 male and 1,299 female), in 526 households and 500 physical houses. The area of the village was given as 1,540 acres.

The 1981 census recorded Kunwarmau (as "Kuawarmau") as having a population of 3,095 people, in 1,080 households. The main staple foods were listed as wheat and rice.

The 1991 census recorded Kunwarmau (as "Kunwar Mau") as having a total population of 3,457 people (1,742 male and 1,715 female), in 718 households and 614 physical houses. The area of the village was listed as 232 hectares. Members of the 0-6 age group numbered 706, or 20.4% of the total; this group was 50% male (360) and 50% female (356). Members of scheduled castes made up 25.8% of the village's population, while no members of scheduled tribes were recorded. The literacy rate of the village was 25% (696 men and 152 women). 949 people were classified as main workers (900 men and 49 women), while 59 people were classified as marginal workers (all women); the remaining 2,449 residents were non-workers. The breakdown of main workers by employment category was as follows: 734 cultivators (i.e. people who owned or leased their own land); 159 agricultural labourers (i.e. people who worked someone else's land in return for payment); 0 workers in livestock, forestry, fishing, hunting, plantations, orchards, etc.; 0 in mining and quarrying; 13 household industry workers; 6 workers employed in other manufacturing, processing, service, and repair roles; 0 construction workers; 17 employed in trade and commerce; 3 employed in transport, storage, and communications; and 17 in other services.
