= Lakhapur, Raebareli =

Lakhapur
- Village
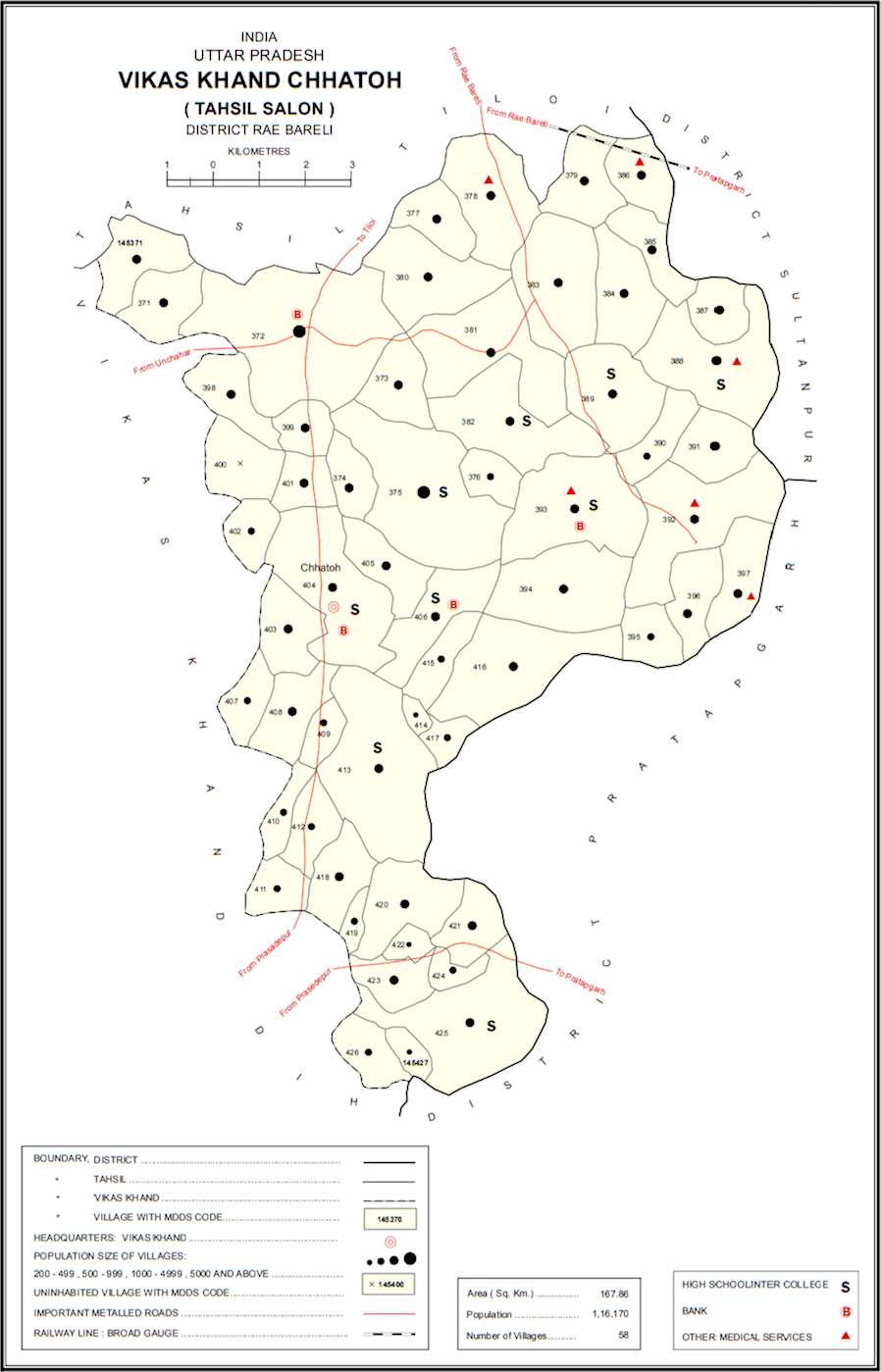
- Map showing Lakhapur (#398) in Chhatoh CD block

- Location in Uttar Pradesh, India
- Coordinates: 26.194243°N 81.496958°E
- Country: India
- State: Uttar Pradesh
- District: Raebareli

Area
  - Total: 2.324 km^{2} (0.897 sq mi)

Population (2011)
  - Total: 2,490
  - Density: 1,070/km^{2} (2,770/sq mi)

Languages
  - Official: Hindi
- Time zone: UTC+5:30 (IST)
- Vehicle registration: UP-35

Lakhapur is a village in Chhatoh block of Rae Bareli district, Uttar Pradesh, India. It is located 32 km from Raebareli, the district headquarters. As of 2011, Lakhapur has a population of 2,490 people, in 426 households. It has one primary school and no healthcare facilities, and it does not host a permanent market or a weekly haat. It belongs to the nyaya panchayat of Chhatoh.

The 1951 census recorded Lakhapur as comprising 5 hamlets, with a total population of 748 people (405 male and 343 female), in 169 households and 156 physical houses. The area of the village was given as 794 acres. 26 residents were literate, all male. The village was listed as belonging to the pargana of Rokha and the thana of Nasirabad.

The 1961 census recorded Lakhapur as comprising 6 hamlets, with a total population of 920 people (469 male and 451 female), in 163 households and 163 physical houses. The area of the village was given as 615 acres.

The 1981 census recorded Lakhapur as having a population of 1,233 people, in 327 households, and having an area of 248.88 hectares. The main staple foods were listed as wheat and rice.

The 1991 census recorded Lakhapur as having a total population of 1,480 people (723 male and 757 female), in 306 households and 295 physical houses. The area of the village was listed as 232 hectares. Members of the 0-6 age group numbered 290, or 19.6% of the total; this group was 44% male (128) and 56% female (162). Members of scheduled castes made up 45.7% of the village's population, while no members of scheduled tribes were recorded. The literacy rate of the village was 16% (200 men and 37 women). 490 people were classified as main workers (396 men and 99 women), while 262 people were classified as marginal workers (18 men and 244 women); the remaining 725 residents were non-workers. The breakdown of main workers by employment category was as follows: 275 cultivators (i.e. people who owned or leased their own land); 179 agricultural labourers (i.e. people who worked someone else's land in return for payment); 2 workers in livestock, forestry, fishing, hunting, plantations, orchards, etc.; 0 in mining and quarrying; 2 household industry workers; 2 workers employed in other manufacturing, processing, service, and repair roles; 1 construction worker; 10 employed in trade and commerce; 3 employed in transport, storage, and communications; and 22 in other services.
