= Ashrafpur, Chhatoh =

Ashrafpur
- Village
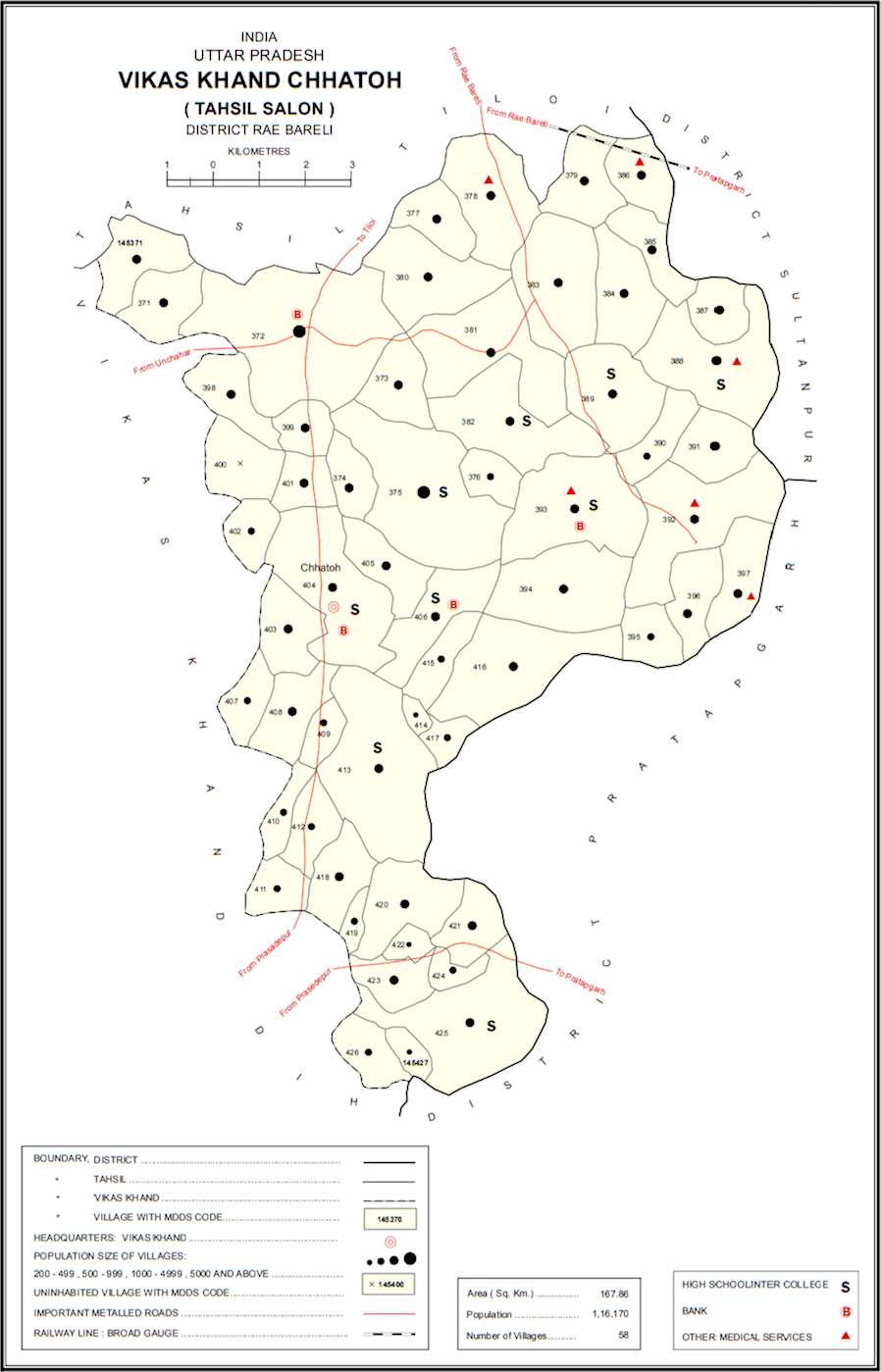
- Map showing Ashrafpur (#381) in Chhatoh CD block

- Location in Uttar Pradesh, India
- Coordinates: 26.212713°N 81.541434°E
- Country India: India
- State: Uttar Pradesh
- District: Raebareli

Area
  - Total: 5.125 km^{2} (1.979 sq mi)

Population (2011)
  - Total: 4,918
  - Density: 959.6/km^{2} (2,485/sq mi)

Languages
  - Official: Hindi
- Time zone: UTC+5:30 (IST)
- PIN: 229307
- Vehicle registration: UP-35

Ashrafpur is a village in the Chhatoh block of Rae Bareli district, Uttar Pradesh, India. It is located 5 km from Jais, the nearest town. As of 2011, Ashrafpur has a population of 4,918 people, in 807 households. It has one primary school and no healthcare facilities. Ashrafpur is the headquarters of a nyaya panchayat that also includes 5 other villages.

The 1951 census recorded Ashrafpur as comprising 12 hamlets, with a total population of 1,535 people (791 male and 744 female), in 342 households and 342 physical houses. The area of the village was given as 1,328 acres. 38 residents were literate, 37 male and 1 female. The village was listed as belonging to the pargana of Rokha and the thana of Nasirabad. As of 1951, Ashrafpur had a primary school with 55 students.

The 1961 census recorded Ashrafpur as comprising 8 hamlets, with a total population of 1,882 people (947 male and 935 female), in 409 households and 379 physical houses. The area of the village was given as 1,328 acres and it had access to electricity at that point.

The 1981 census recorded Ashrafpur as having a population of 2,439 people, in 604 households, and an area of 537.42 hectares. The main staple foods were listed as wheat and rice.

The 1991 census recorded Ashrafpur as having a total population of 2,919 people (1,503 male and 1,416 female), in 620 households and 620 physical houses. The area of the village was listed as 511 hectares. Members of the 0-6 age group numbered 607, or 20.8% of the total; this group was 52% male (313) and 48% female (294). Members of scheduled castes made up 37.7% of the village's population, while no members of scheduled tribes were recorded. The literacy rate of the village was 16% (374 men and 84 women). 968 people were classified as main workers (764 men and 204 women), while 17 people were classified as marginal workers (all women); the remaining 1,934 residents were non-workers. The breakdown of main workers by employment category was as follows: 708 cultivators (i.e. people who owned or leased their own land); 196 agricultural labourers (i.e. people who worked someone else's land in return for payment); 0 workers in livestock, forestry, fishing, hunting, plantations, orchards, etc.; 0 in mining and quarrying; 1 household industry worker; 9 workers employed in other manufacturing, processing, service, and repair roles; 5 construction workers; 16 employed in trade and commerce; 1 employed in transport, storage, and communications; and 32 in other services.
