= Chaturpur =

- Village
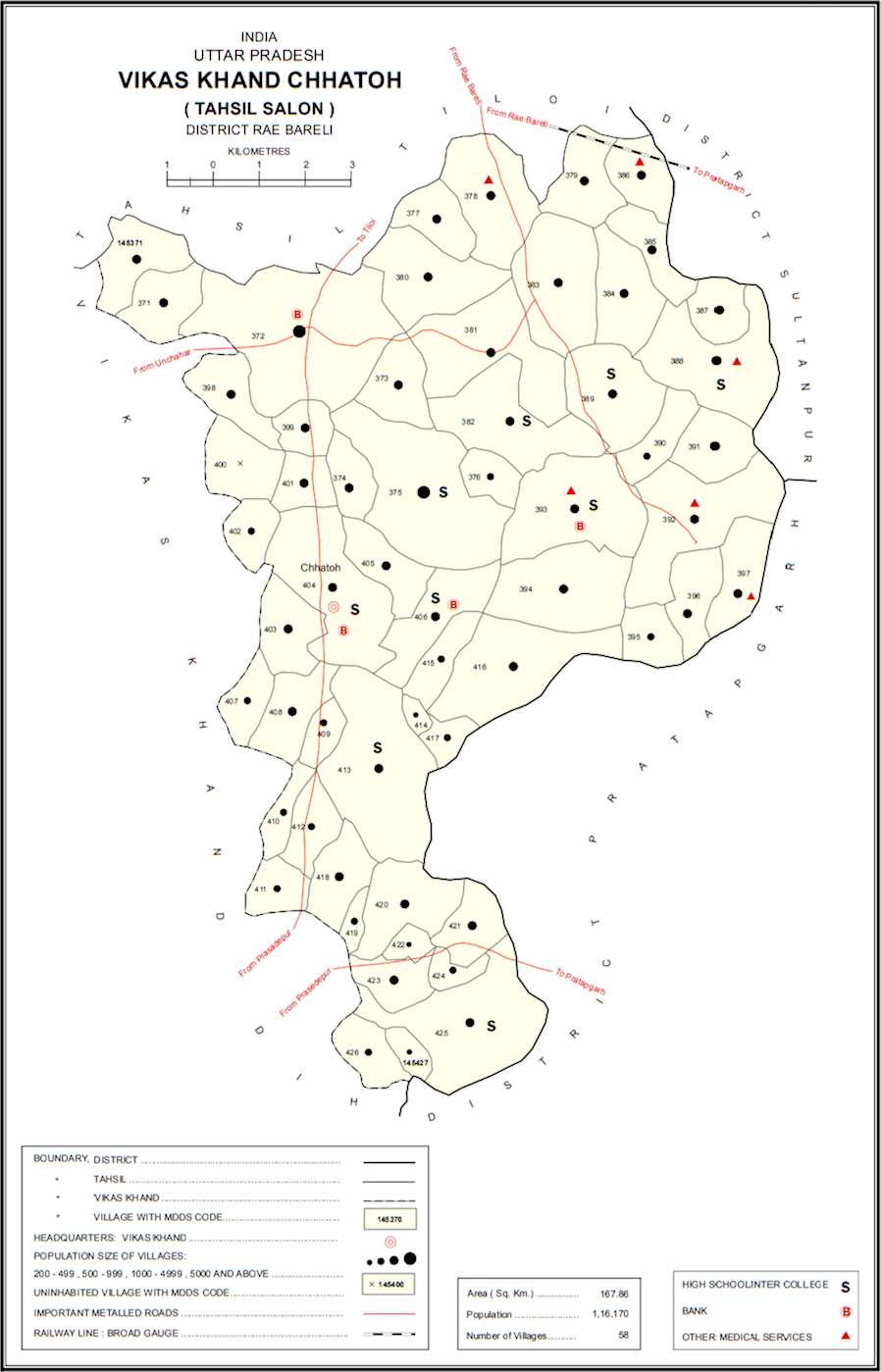
- Map showing Chaturpur (#401) in Chhatoh CD block

- Location in Uttar Pradesh, India
- Coordinates: 26.181723°N 81.508012°E
- Country: India
- State: Uttar Pradesh
- District: Raebareli

Area
  - Total: 1.515 km^{2} (0.585 sq mi)

Population (2011)
  - Total: 1,618
  - Density: 1,068/km^{2} (2,766/sq mi)

Languages
  - Official: Hindi
- Time zone: UTC+5:30 (IST)
- Vehicle registration: UP-35

Chaturpur is a village in Chhatoh block of Rae Bareli district, Uttar Pradesh, India. It is located 36 km from Raebareli, the district headquarters. As of 2011, Chaturpur has a population of 1,618 people, in 337 households. It has one primary school. The village hosts no healthcare facilities, permanent market or a weekly haat. It belongs to the nyaya panchayat of Chhatoh.

The 1951 census recorded Chaturpur as comprising 2 hamlets, with a population of 528 people (284 male and 244 female), in 137 households and 131 physical houses. The area of the village was given as 384 acres. 7 residents were literate, all male. The village was listed as belonging to the pargana of Rokha and the thana of Nasirabad.

The 1961 census recorded Chaturpur as comprising 2 hamlets, with a total population of 624 people (278 male and 346 female), in 156 households and 154 physical houses. The area of the village was given as 384 acres.

The 1981 census recorded Chaturpur as having a population of 896 people, in 244 households, and having an area of 155.40 hectares. The main staple foods were listed as wheat and rice.

The 1991 census recorded Chaturpur as having a total population of 1,127 people (604 male and 523 female), in 234 households and 233 physical houses. The area of the village was listed as 152 hectares. Members of the 0-6 age group numbered 181, or 16.1% of the total; this group was 49% male (89) and 51% female (92). Members of scheduled castes made up 25.0% of the village's population, while no members of scheduled tribes were recorded. The literacy rate of the village was 28% (286 men and 28 women). 346 people were classified as main workers (340 men and 6 women), while 90 people were classified as marginal workers (3 men and 87 women); the remaining 691 residents were non-workers. The breakdown of main workers by employment category was as follows: 239 cultivators (i.e. people who owned or leased their own land); 99 agricultural labourers (i.e. people who worked someone else's land in return for payment); 0 workers in livestock, forestry, fishing, hunting, plantations, orchards, etc.; 0 in mining and quarrying; 0 household industry workers; 0 workers employed in other manufacturing, processing, service, and repair roles; 0 construction workers; 0 employed in trade and commerce; 0 employed in transport, storage, and communications; and 8 in other services.
