= Gopalipur =

Gopalipur Gopālipur
- Village
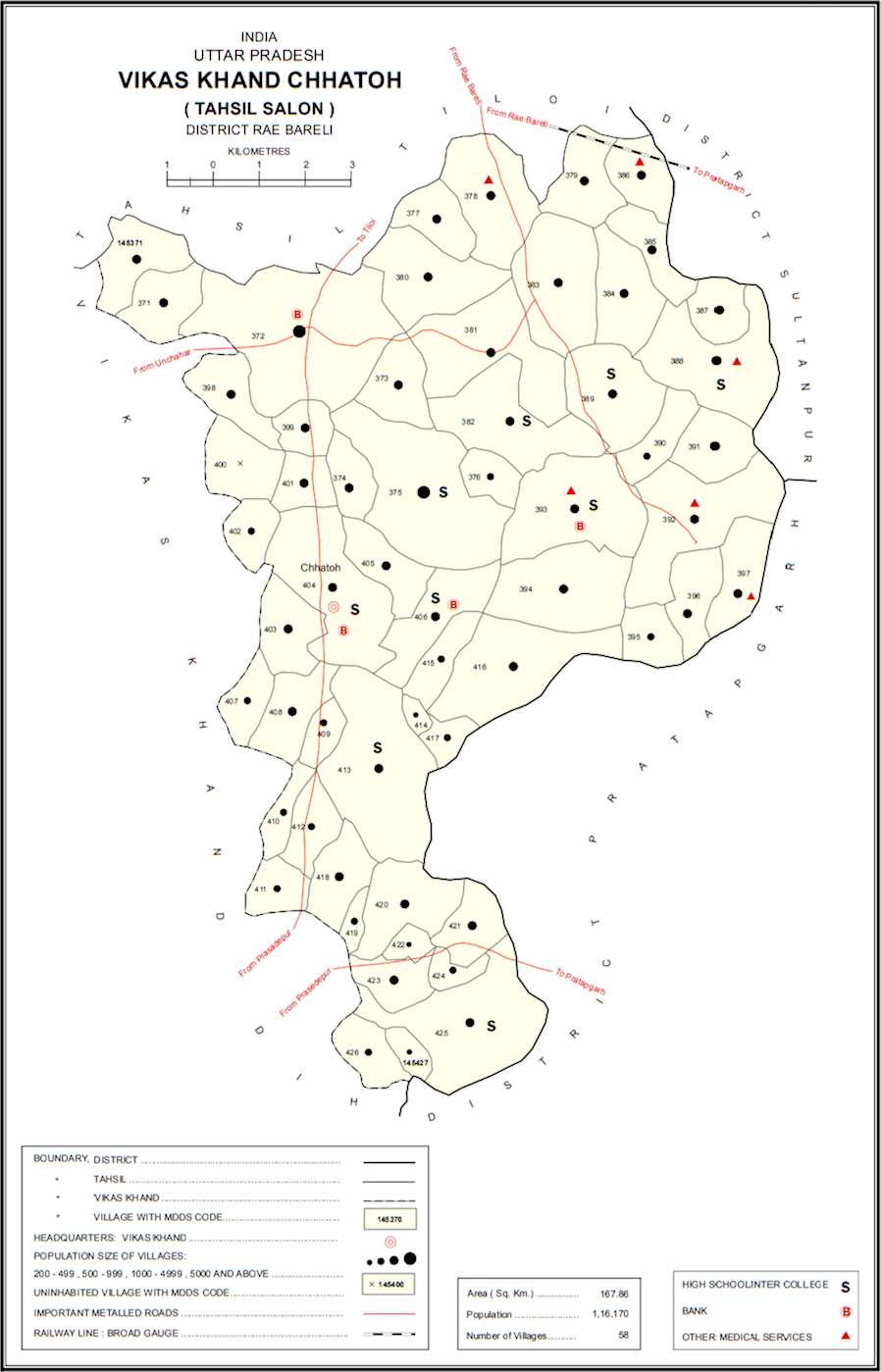
- Map showing Gopalipur (#411) in Chhatoh CD block

- Location in Uttar Pradesh, India
- Coordinates: 26.094797°N 81.502522°E
- Country: India
- State: Uttar Pradesh
- District: Raebareli

Area
  - Total: 1.325 km^{2} (0.512 sq mi)

Population (2011)
  - Total: 886
  - Density: 669/km^{2} (1,730/sq mi)

Languages
  - Official: Hindi
- Time zone: UTC+5:30 (IST)
- Vehicle registration: UP-35

Gopalipur is a village in Chhatoh block of Rae Bareli district, Uttar Pradesh, India. As of 2011, it has a population of 886 people, in 152 households. It has one primary school and no healthcare facilities, and it does not host a permanent market or a weekly haat.

The 1961 census recorded Gopalipur as comprising 2 hamlets, with a total population of 347 people (166 male and 181 female), in 87 households and 87 physical houses. The area of the village was given as 332 acres.

The 1981 census recorded Gopalipur as having a population of 482 people, in 118 households, and having an area of 134.76 hectares. The main staple foods were listed as wheat and rice.
