= Bewal, Raebareli =

Bewal
- Village
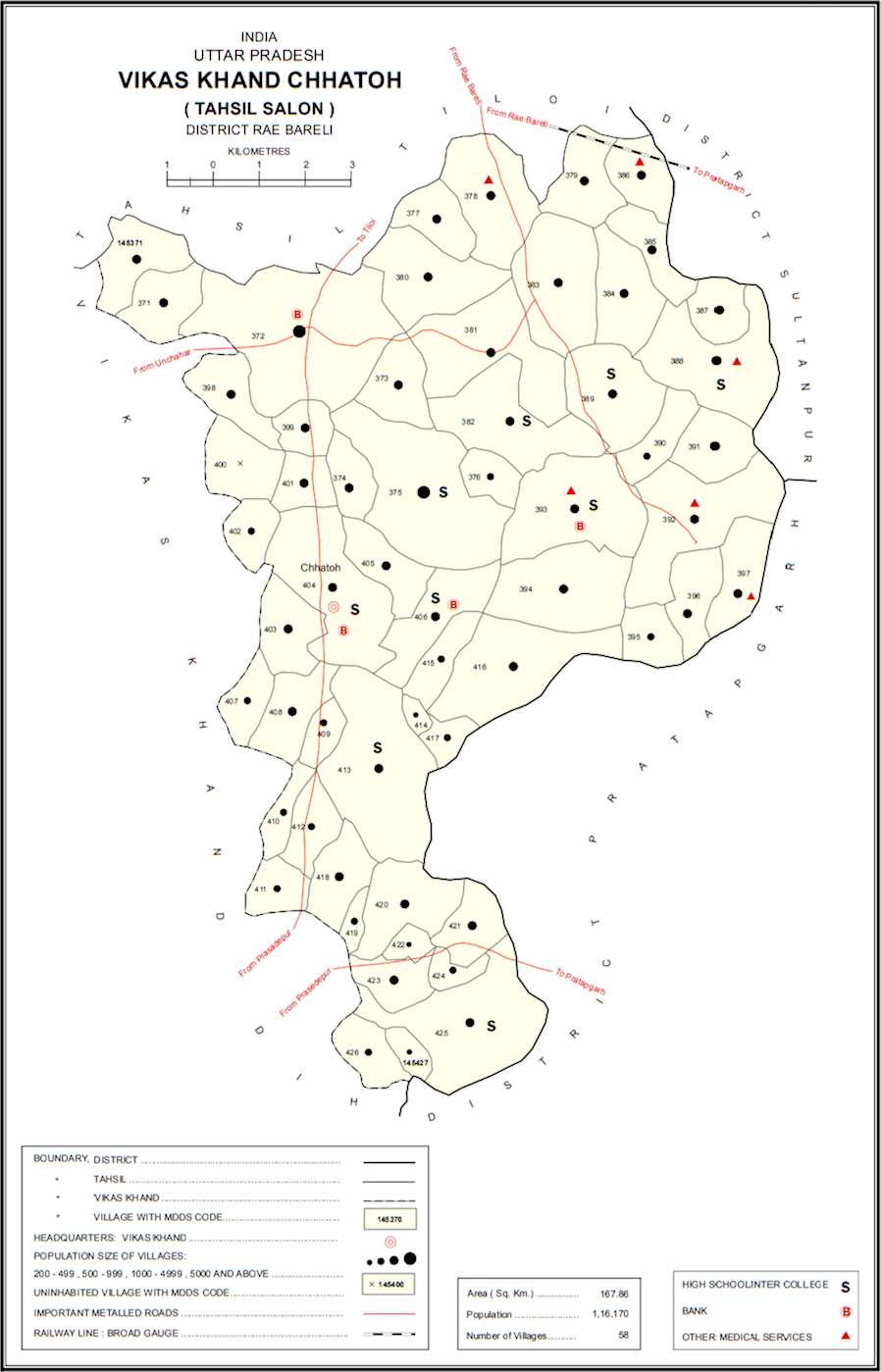
- Map showing Bewal (#416) in Chhatoh CD block

- Location in Uttar Pradesh, India
- Coordinates: 26.144264°N 81.558063°E
- Country: India
- State: Uttar Pradesh
- District: Raebareli

Area
  - Total: 7.117 km^{2} (2.748 sq mi)

Population (2011)
  - Total: 2,781
  - Density: 390.8/km^{2} (1,012/sq mi)

Languages
  - Official: Hindi
- Time zone: UTC+5:30 (IST)
- Vehicle registration: UP-35

Bewal is a village in Chhatoh block of Rae Bareli district, Uttar Pradesh, India. It is located 32 km from Raebareli, the district headquarters. As of 2011, Bewal has a population of 2,781 people, in 485 households. It has 4 primary schools and no healthcare facilities, and it hosts a weekly haat but not a permanent market. It belongs to the nyaya panchayat of Bhuwalpur Sisni.

The 1951 census recorded Bewal as comprising 23 hamlets, with a total population of 1,183 people (605 male and 578 female), in 298 households and 247 physical houses. The area of the village was given as 1,421 acres. 15 residents were literate, all male. The village was listed as belonging to the pargana of Parshadepur and the thana of Nasirabad. As of 1951, Bewal had a primary school with 103 students.

The 1961 census recorded Bewal as comprising 26 hamlets, with a total population of 1,455 people (686 male and 769 female), in 298 households and 287 physical houses. The area of the village was given as 1,429 acres.

The 1981 census recorded Bewal as having a population of 1,940 people, in 457 households, and having an area of 575.06 hectares. The main staple foods were listed as wheat and rice.

The 1991 census recorded Bewal as having a total population of 2,292 people (1,179 male and 1,113 female), in 434 households and 433 physical houses. The area of the village was listed as 468 hectares. Members of the 0-6 age group numbered 392, or 17.1% of the total; this group was 56% male (221) and 44% female (171). Members of scheduled castes made up 16.7% of the village's population, while no members of scheduled tribes were recorded. The literacy rate of the village was 16% (318 men and 53 women). 675 people were classified as main workers (537 men and 138 women), while 298 people were classified as marginal workers (47 men and 251 women); the remaining 1,319 residents were non-workers. The breakdown of main workers by employment category was as follows: 564 cultivators (i.e. people who owned or leased their own land); 78 agricultural labourers (i.e. people who worked someone else's land in return for payment); 6 workers in livestock, forestry, fishing, hunting, plantations, orchards, etc.; 0 in mining and quarrying; 0 household industry workers; 0 workers employed in other manufacturing, processing, service, and repair roles; 0 construction workers; 3 employed in trade and commerce; 0 employed in transport, storage, and communications; and 24 in other services.

== History ==
Bewal was a Jamindari before independence, which was ruled by Kanhpuria Kshatriya ( Rajputs ), who was a part/family of Tekari Raj, about 200 years old Kot/palace is still situated in Bewal.
