= Bani, Chhatoh =

Bani
- Village
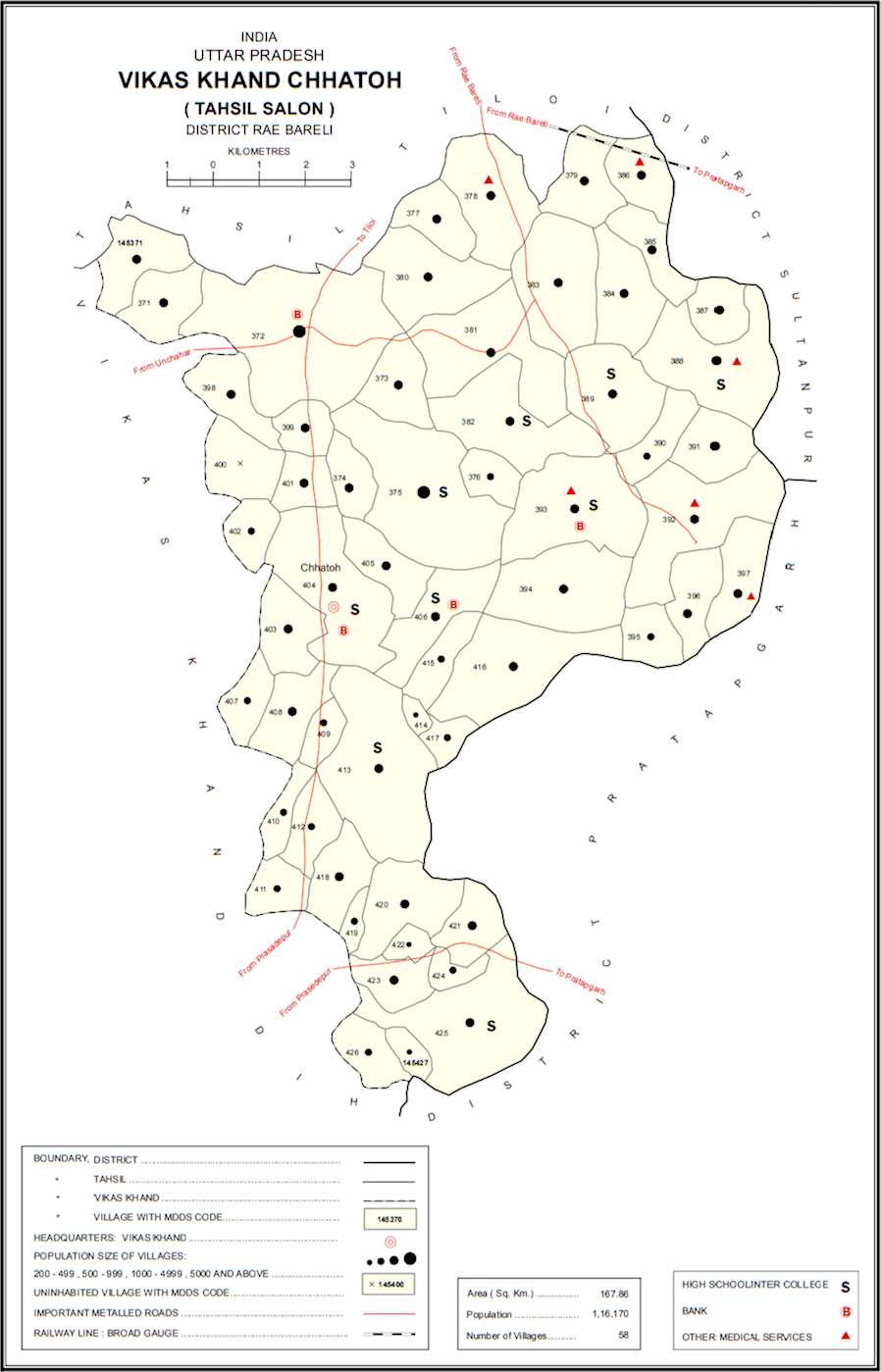
- Map showing Bani (#386) in Chhatoh CD block

- Location in Uttar Pradesh, India
- Coordinates: 26.242971°N 81.583556°E
- Country India: India
- State: Uttar Pradesh
- District: Raebareli

Area
  - Total: 1.702 km^{2} (0.657 sq mi)

Population (2011)
  - Total: 1,682
  - Density: 988.2/km^{2} (2,560/sq mi)

Languages
  - Official: Hindi
- Time zone: UTC+5:30 (IST)
- PIN: 229307
- Vehicle registration: UP-35

Bani is a village in Chhatoh block of Rae Bareli district, Uttar Pradesh, India. It is located 4 km from Jais, the nearest town. As of 2011, Bani has a population of 1,682 people, in 325 households. It has no schools and one mobile health clinic. It belongs to the nyaya panchayat of Hajipur.

The 1951 census recorded Bani as comprising 4 hamlets, with a population of 490 people (257 male and 233 female), in 101 households and 87 physical houses. The village spans 388 acres. 17 residents were literate, all male. The village was listed as belonging to the pargana of Rokha and the thana of Nasirabad.

The 1961 census recorded Bani as comprising 4 hamlets, with a total population of 537 people (275 male and 262 female), in 107 households and 107 physical houses. The area of the village was given as 388 acres.

The 1981 census recorded Bani as having a population of 856 people, in 180 households, and having an area of 163.08 hectares. The main staple foods were listed as wheat and rice.

The 1991 census recorded Bani as having a total population of 1,092 people (537 male and 555 female), in 219 households and 213 physical houses. The area of the village was listed as 163 hectares. Members of the 0-6 age group numbered 223, or 20.4% of the total; this group was 48% male (106) and 52% female (117). Members of scheduled castes made up 32.9% of the village's population, while no members of scheduled tribes were recorded. The literacy rate of the village was 17% (151 men and 36 women). 424 people were classified as main workers (289 men and 135 women), while 0 people were classified as marginal workers; the remaining 668 residents were non-workers. The breakdown of main workers by employment category was as follows: 311 cultivators (i.e. people who owned or leased their own land); 46 agricultural labourers (i.e. people who worked someone else's land in return for payment); 0 workers in livestock, forestry, fishing, hunting, plantations, orchards, etc.; 0 in mining and quarrying; 0 household industry workers; 21 workers employed in other manufacturing, processing, service, and repair roles; 3 construction workers; 8 employed in trade and commerce; 0 employed in transport, storage, and communications; and 35 in other services.
