= Bedhauna =

- Village
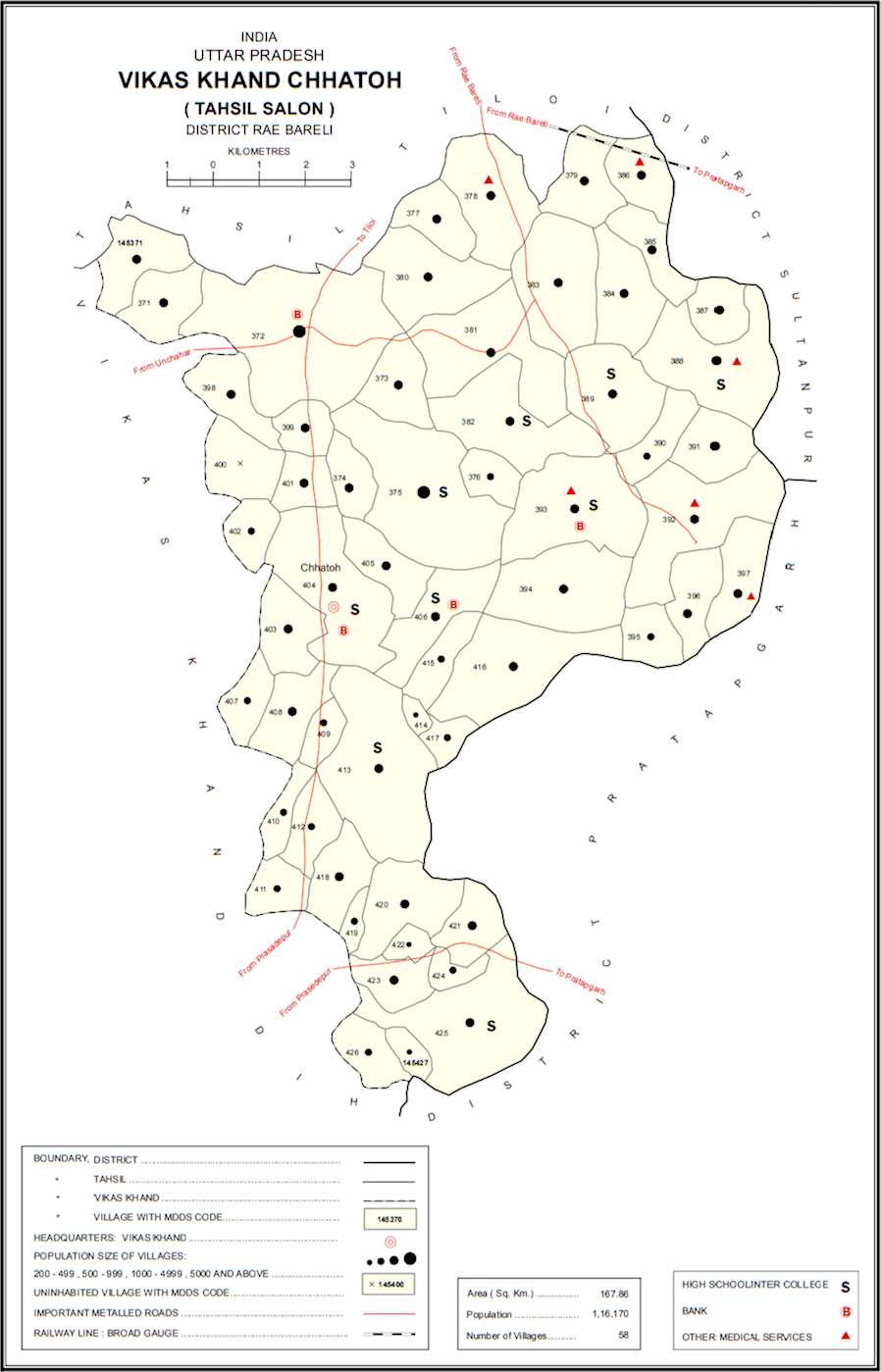
- Map showing Bedhauna (#373) in Chhatoh CD block

- Location in Uttar Pradesh, India
- Coordinates: 26.199679°N 81.531385°E
- Country: India
- State: Uttar Pradesh
- District: Raebareli

Area
  - Total: 2.137 km^{2} (0.825 sq mi)

Population (2011)
  - Total: 2,167
  - Density: 1,014/km^{2} (2,626/sq mi)

Languages
  - Official: Hindi
- Time zone: UTC+5:30 (IST)
- PIN: 229307
- Vehicle registration: UP-35

Bedhauna is a village in Chhatoh block of Rae Bareli district, Uttar Pradesh, India. As of 2011, it has a population of 2,167 people, in 389 households. It has two primary schools and no healthcare facilities. It belongs to the nyaya panchayat of Nasirabad.

The 1961 census recorded Bedhauna (as "Barhauna") as comprising 8 hamlets, with a total population of 863 people (407 male and 456 female), in 185 households and 182 physical houses. The area of the village was given as 558 acres.

The 1991 census recorded Bedhauna (as "Bethauna") as having a total population of 1,370 people (714 male and 656 female), in 277 households and 275 physical houses. The area of the village was listed as 214 hectares. Members of the 0-6 age group numbered 288, or 21.0% of the total; this group was 55% male (158) and 45% female (130). Members of scheduled castes made up 64.3% of the village's population, while no members of scheduled tribes were recorded. The literacy rate of the village was 16% (193 men and 24 women). 356 people were classified as main workers (349 men and 7 women), while 0 people were classified as marginal workers; the remaining 1,014 residents were non-workers. The breakdown of main workers by employment category was as follows: 278 cultivators (i.e. people who owned or leased their own land); 64 agricultural labourers (i.e. people who worked someone else's land in return for payment); 0 workers in livestock, forestry, fishing, hunting, plantations, orchards, etc.; 0 in mining and quarrying; 7 household industry workers; 1 worker employed in other manufacturing, processing, service, and repair roles; 0 construction worker; 0 employed in trade and commerce; 0 employed in transport, storage, and communications; and 6 in other services.
