= Tarapur, Raebareli =

Tarapur Tārāpur
- Village
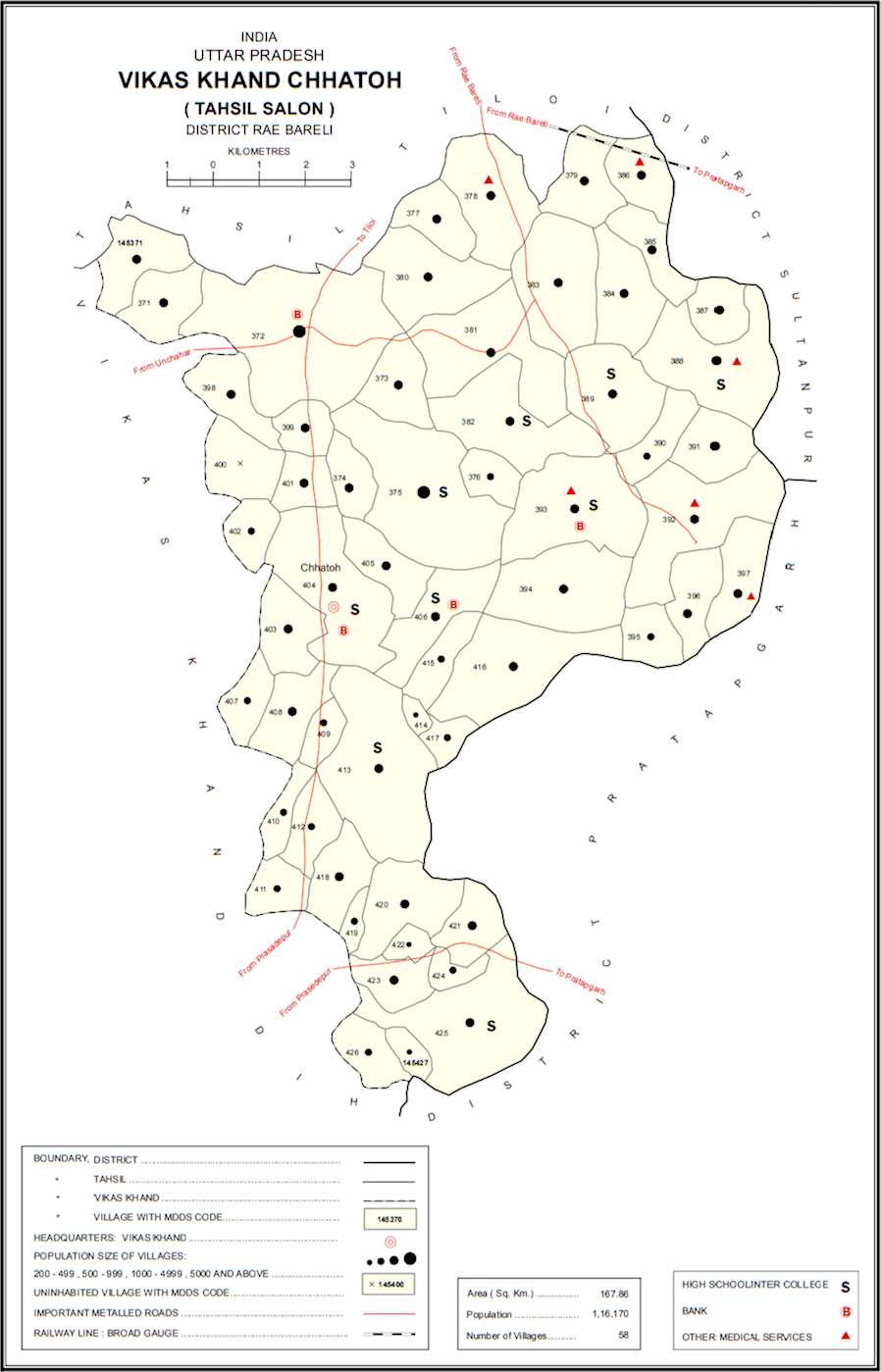
- Map showing Tarapur (#387) in Chhatoh CD block

- Location in Uttar Pradesh, India
- Coordinates: 26.210319°N 81.602653°E
- Country: India
- State: Uttar Pradesh
- District: Raebareli

Area
  - Total: 1.616 km^{2} (0.624 sq mi)

Population (2011)
  - Total: 1,010
  - Density: 625/km^{2} (1,620/sq mi)

Languages
  - Official: Hindi
- Time zone: UTC+5:30 (IST)
- Vehicle registration: UP-35

Tarapur is a village in Chhatoh block of Rae Bareli district, Uttar Pradesh, India. As of 2011, Tarapur has a population of 1,010 people, in 183 households. It has one primary school and no healthcare facilities. It belongs to the nyaya panchayat of Hajipur.

The 1951 census recorded Tarapur as comprising 3 hamlets, with a total population of 282 people (162 male and 120 female), in 68 households and 62 physical houses. The area of the village was given as 421 acres. 1 resident was literate. The village was listed as belonging to the pargana of Rokha and the thana of Nasirabad.

The 1961 census recorded Tarapur as comprising 3 hamlets, with a total population of 317 people (159 male and 158 female), in 76 households and 76 physical houses. The area of the village was given as 421 acres.

The 1981 census recorded Tarapur as having a population of 513 people, in 121 households, and having an area of 161.46 hectares. The main staple foods were listed as wheat and rice.

The 1991 census recorded Tarapur as having a total population of 585 people (300 male and 285 female), in 115 households and 115 physical houses. The area of the village was listed as 161 hectares. Members of the 0-6 age group numbered 120, or 20.5% of the total; this group was 53% male (63) and 47% female (57). Members of scheduled castes made up 32.3% of the village's population, while no members of scheduled tribes were recorded. The literacy rate of the village was 9% (49 men and 5 women). 163 people were classified as main workers (152 men and 11 women), while 2 people were classified as marginal workers (both men); the remaining 320 residents were non-workers. The breakdown of main workers by employment category was as follows: 121 cultivators (i.e. people who owned or leased their own land); 36 agricultural labourers (i.e. people who worked someone else's land in return for payment); 0 workers in livestock, forestry, fishing, hunting, plantations, orchards, etc.; 0 in mining and quarrying; 0 household industry workers; 0 workers employed in other manufacturing, processing, service, and repair roles; 0 construction workers; 1 employed in trade and commerce; 0 employed in transport, storage, and communications; and 5 in other services.
