= Digha, Raebareli =

Digha Dīgha
- Village
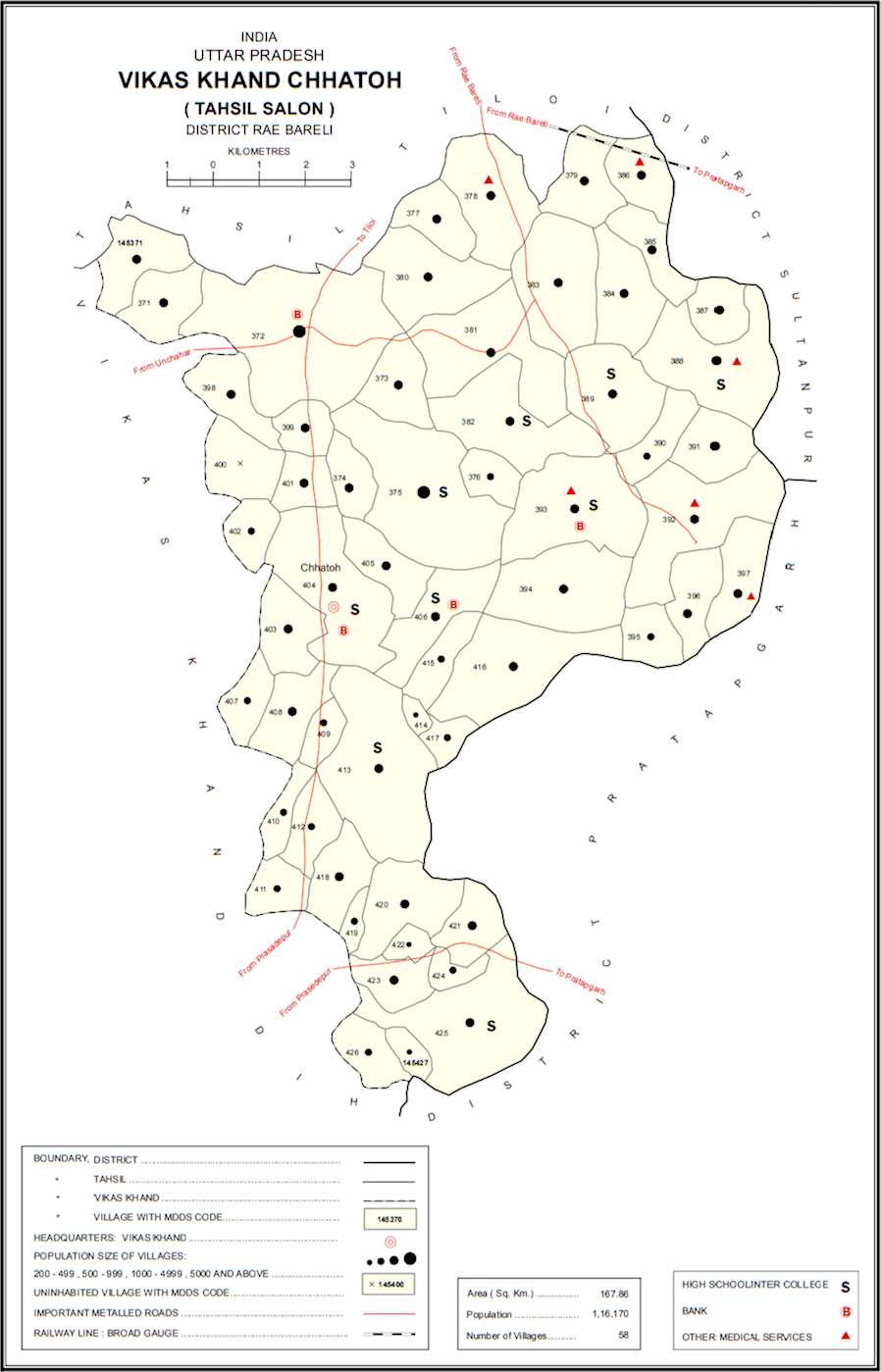
- Map showing Digha (#389) in Chhatoh CD block

- Location in Uttar Pradesh, India
- Coordinates: 26.195607°N 81.578838°E
- Country India: India
- State: Uttar Pradesh
- District: Raebareli

Area
  - Total: 4.635 km^{2} (1.790 sq mi)

Population (2011)
  - Total: 1,536
  - Density: 331.4/km^{2} (858.3/sq mi)

Languages
  - Official: Hindi
- Time zone: UTC+5:30 (IST)
- Vehicle registration: UP-35

Digha is a village in Chhatoh block of Rae Bareli district, Uttar Pradesh, India. It is located 7 km from Jais, the nearest town. As of 2011, Digha has a population of 1,536 people, in 288 households. It has one primary school and no healthcare facilities. It belongs to the nyaya panchayat of Paraiya Namaksar.

The 1951 census recorded Digha as comprising 5 hamlets, with a total population of 480 people (227 male and 253 female), in 46 households and 41 physical houses. The area of the village was given as 920 acres. 11 residents were literate, all male. The village was listed as belonging to the pargana of Rokha and the thana of Nasirabad.

The 1961 census recorded Digha as comprising 5 hamlets, with a total population of 574 people (277 male and 297 female), in 142 households and 121 physical houses. The area of the village was given as 920 acres.

The 1981 census recorded Digha (as "Deegha") as having a population of 698 people, in 135 households, and having an area of 356.13 hectares. The main staple foods were listed as wheat and rice.

The 1991 census recorded Digha as having a total population of 874 people (472 male and 402 female), in 189 households and 189 physical houses. The area of the village was listed as 351 hectares. Members of the 0-6 age group numbered 138, or 15.8% of the total; this group was 50% male (69) and 50% female (69). Members of scheduled castes made up 43.1% of the village's population, while no members of scheduled tribes were recorded. The literacy rate of the village was 13% (100 men and 11 women). 324 people were classified as main workers (274 men and 50 women), while 0 people were classified as marginal workers; the remaining 550 residents were non-workers. The breakdown of main workers by employment category was as follows: 294 cultivators (i.e. people who owned or leased their own land); 25 agricultural labourers (i.e. people who worked someone else's land in return for payment); 0 workers in livestock, forestry, fishing, hunting, plantations, orchards, etc.; 0 in mining and quarrying; 0 household industry workers; 2 workers employed in other manufacturing, processing, service, and repair roles; 0 construction workers; 0 employed in trade and commerce; 0 employed in transport, storage, and communications; and 3 in other services.
