= Ashrafpur =

- Location in Bangladesh
- Coordinates: 23°55′04″N 90°59′10″E
- Country: Bangladesh
- Division: Chittagong Division
- District: Brahmanbaria District
- Time zone: UTC+6 (Bangladesh Time)

Ashrafpur is a village in Nabinagar Upazila, Brahmanbaria District in the Chittagong Division of eastern Bangladesh. It has an area of 1.8 square kilometres (0.69 sq mi) and a population of 1400. There are two mosques, one school and one madrasah.
