= Bara, Raebareli =

Bara Bāra
- Village
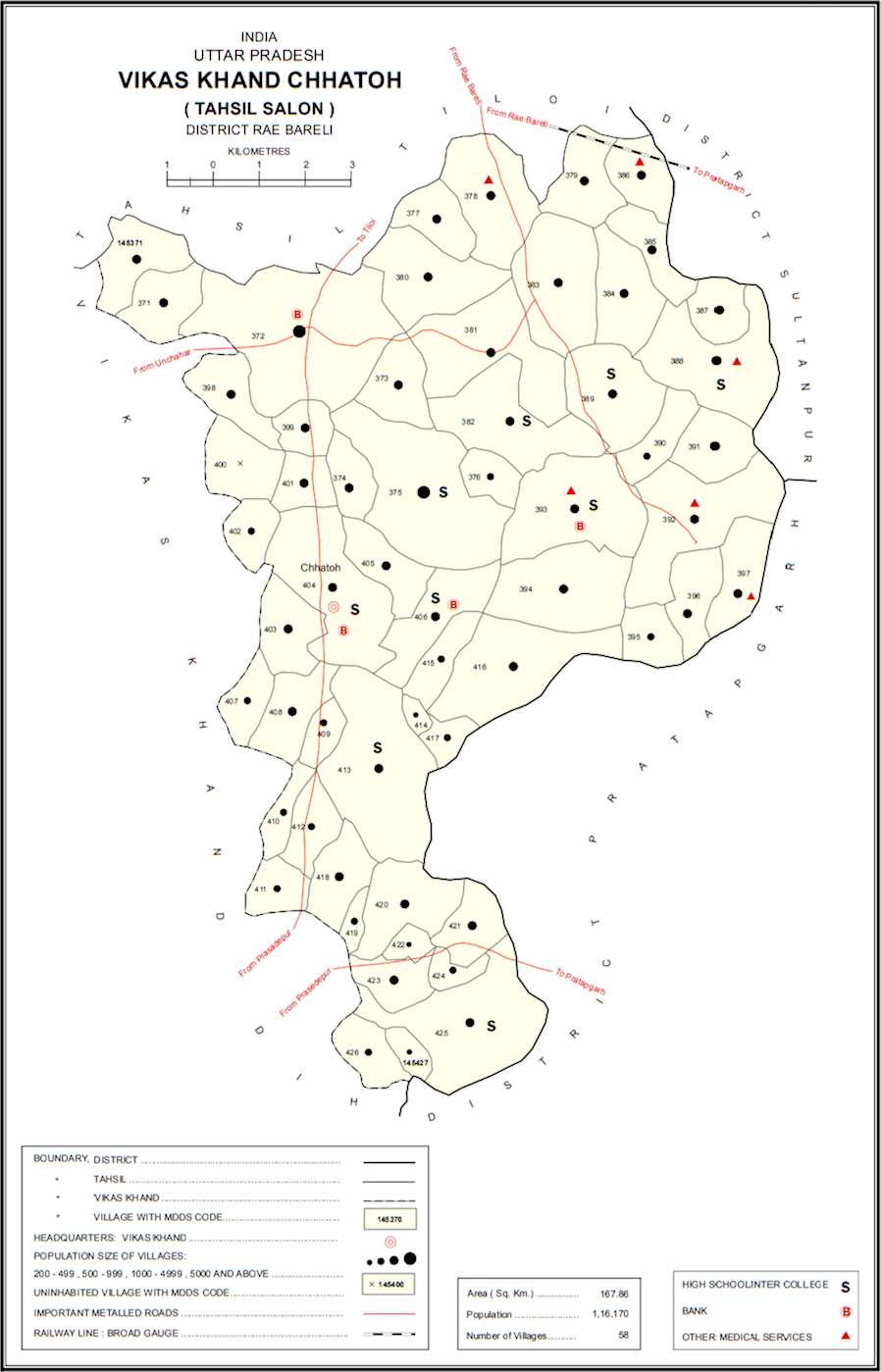
- Map showing Bara (#425) in Chhatoh CD block

- Location in Uttar Pradesh, India
- Coordinates: 26.07223°N 81.54914°E
- Country India: India
- State: Uttar Pradesh
- District: Raebareli

Area
  - Total: 5.232 km^{2} (2.020 sq mi)

Population (2011)
  - Total: 3,578
  - Density: 683.9/km^{2} (1,771/sq mi)

Languages
  - Official: Hindi
- Time zone: UTC+5:30 (IST)
- PIN: 229307
- Vehicle registration: UP-35

Bara is a village in Chhatoh block of Rae Bareli district, Uttar Pradesh, India. It is located 13 km from Salon, the tehsil headquarters. As of 2011, Bara has a population of 3,578 people, in 708 households. It has two primary schools and no healthcare facilities. It is the headquarters of a nyaya panchayat which also includes 9 other villages.

The 1951 census recorded Bara as comprising 15 hamlets, with a total population of 1,576 people (780 male and 796 female), in 344 households and 316 physical houses. The area of the village was given as 1,722 acres. 67 residents were literate, 55 male and 12 female. The village was listed as belonging to the pargana of Parshadepur and the thana of Salon. Bara at that point had a primary school with 85 students.

The 1961 census recorded Bara as comprising 13 hamlets, with a total population of 1,649 people (818 male and 831 female), in 348 households and 328 physical houses. The area of the village was given as 1,722 acres and it had a medical practitioner and electrical access at that point.

The 1981 census recorded Bara as having a population of 2,302 people, in 507 households, and having an area of 627.26 hectares. The main staple foods were listed as wheat and rice.

The 1991 census recorded Bara as having a total population of 2,880 people (1,494 male and 1,386 female), in 555 households and 555 physical houses. The area of the village was listed as 700 hectares. Members of the 0-6 age group numbered 576, or 20.0% of the total; this group was 51% male (291) and 49% female (285). Members of scheduled castes made up 30.0% of the village's population, while no members of scheduled tribes were recorded. The literacy rate of the village was 30% (671 men and 206 women). 969 people were classified as main workers (782 men and 187 women), while 14 people were classified as marginal workers (all women); the remaining 1,897 residents were non-workers. The breakdown of main workers by employment category was as follows: 496 cultivators (i.e. people who owned or leased their own land); 390 agricultural labourers (i.e. people who worked someone else's land in return for payment); 0 workers in livestock, forestry, fishing, hunting, plantations, orchards, etc.; 0 in mining and quarrying; 27 household industry workers; 2 workers employed in other manufacturing, processing, service, and repair roles; 0 construction workers; 4 employed in trade and commerce; 0 employed in transport, storage, and communications; and 50 in other services.
