= Paraiya Namaksar =

- Village
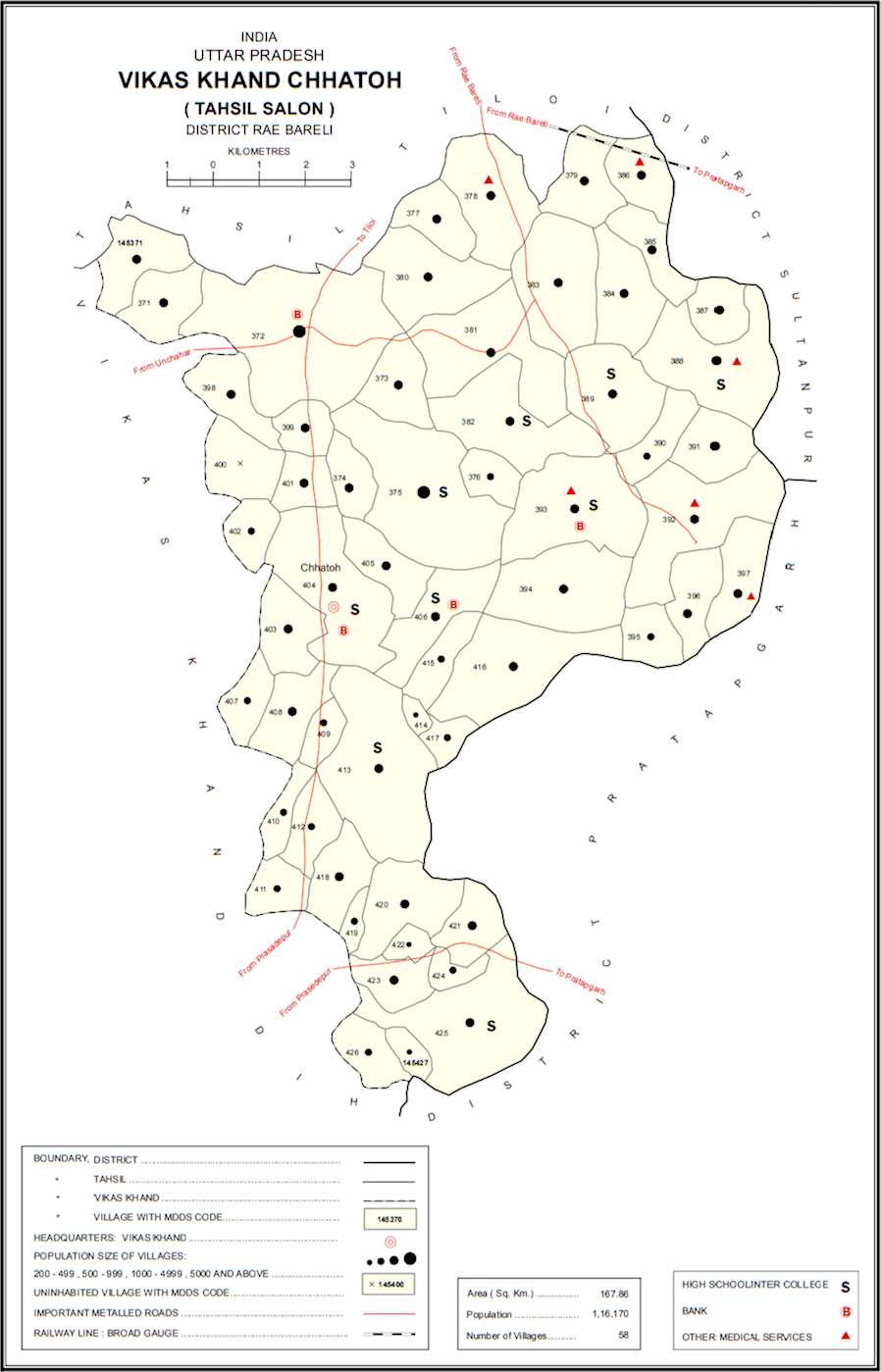
- Map showing Paraiya Namaksar (#393) in Chhatoh CD block

- Location in Uttar Pradesh, India
- Coordinates: 26.173308°N 81.574391°E
- Country: India
- State: Uttar Pradesh
- District: Raebareli

Area
  - Total: 5.294 km^{2} (2.044 sq mi)

Population (2011)
  - Total: 4,506
  - Density: 851.2/km^{2} (2,204/sq mi)

Languages
  - Official: Hindi
- Time zone: UTC+5:30 (IST)
- Vehicle registration: UP-35

Paraiya Namaksar is a village in Chhatoh block of Rae Bareli district, Uttar Pradesh, India. It is located 14 km from Jais, the nearest large town. As of 2011, Paraiya Namaksar has a population of 4,506 people, in 820 households. It has four primary schools and one primary health sub centre. It hosts a market twice per week, on Tuesdays and Saturdays. Grain, vegetables, and cloth are the main items traded. Paraiya Namaksar is also the headquarters of a nyaya panchayat which also covers 8 other villages.

The 1951 census recorded Paraiya Namaksar (as "Poraiya Namaksar") as comprising 9 hamlets, with a total population of 1,732 people (857 male and 875 female), in 485 households and 417 physical houses. The area of the village was given as 1,378 acres. 103 residents were literate, 101 male and 2 female. The village was listed as belonging to the pargana of Rokha and the thana of Nasirabad. As of 1951, Paraiya Namaksar had a primary school with 109 students.

The 1961 census recorded Paraiya Namaksar as comprising 11 hamlets, with a total population of 1,904 people (950 male and 954 female), in 437 households and 357 physical houses. The area of the village was given as 2,101 acres and it had a post office at that point. Average attendance of the twice-weekly market was about 500 people.

The 1981 census recorded Paraiya Namaksar (as "Paraiya Namaksare") as having a population of 2,627 people, in 714 households, and having an area of 557.65 hectares. The main staple foods were listed as wheat and rice.

The 1991 census recorded Paraiya Namaksar as having a total population of 3,133 people (1,579 male and 1,554 female), in 612 households and 609 physical houses. The area of the village was listed as 524 hectares. Members of the 0-6 age group numbered 634, or 20.2% of the total; this group was 50% male (318) and 50% female (316). Members of scheduled castes made up 33.6% of the village's population, while no members of scheduled tribes were recorded. The literacy rate of the village was 26% (673 men and 152 women). 839 people were classified as main workers (800 men and 39 women), while 473 people were classified as marginal workers (4 men and 469 women); the remaining 1,821 residents were non-workers. The breakdown of main workers by employment category was as follows: 581 cultivators (i.e. people who owned or leased their own land); 172 agricultural labourers (i.e. people who worked someone else's land in return for payment); 1 worker in livestock, forestry, fishing, hunting, plantations, orchards, etc.; 0 in mining and quarrying; 3 household industry workers; 12 workers employed in other manufacturing, processing, service, and repair roles; 0 construction workers; 10 employed in trade and commerce; 4 employed in transport, storage, and communications; and 56 in other services.
