= Tila =

Tila may refer to:

== Places ==
- Tila, Chiapas, a town in southern Mexico
- Tila, Israel, a planned city in southern Israel
- Tila, Jumla, rural municipality in Karnali province, Nepal
- Tila, Raebareli, a village in Uttar Pradesh, India

== Other ==
- Tila (moth), a genus of moth in the family Gelechiidae
- Tila Nguyen, internet celebrity and model better known as Tila Tequila
- Truth in Lending Act, United States law commonly abbreviated TILA
