= Ugabhad =

Ugabhad Ugābhād
- Village
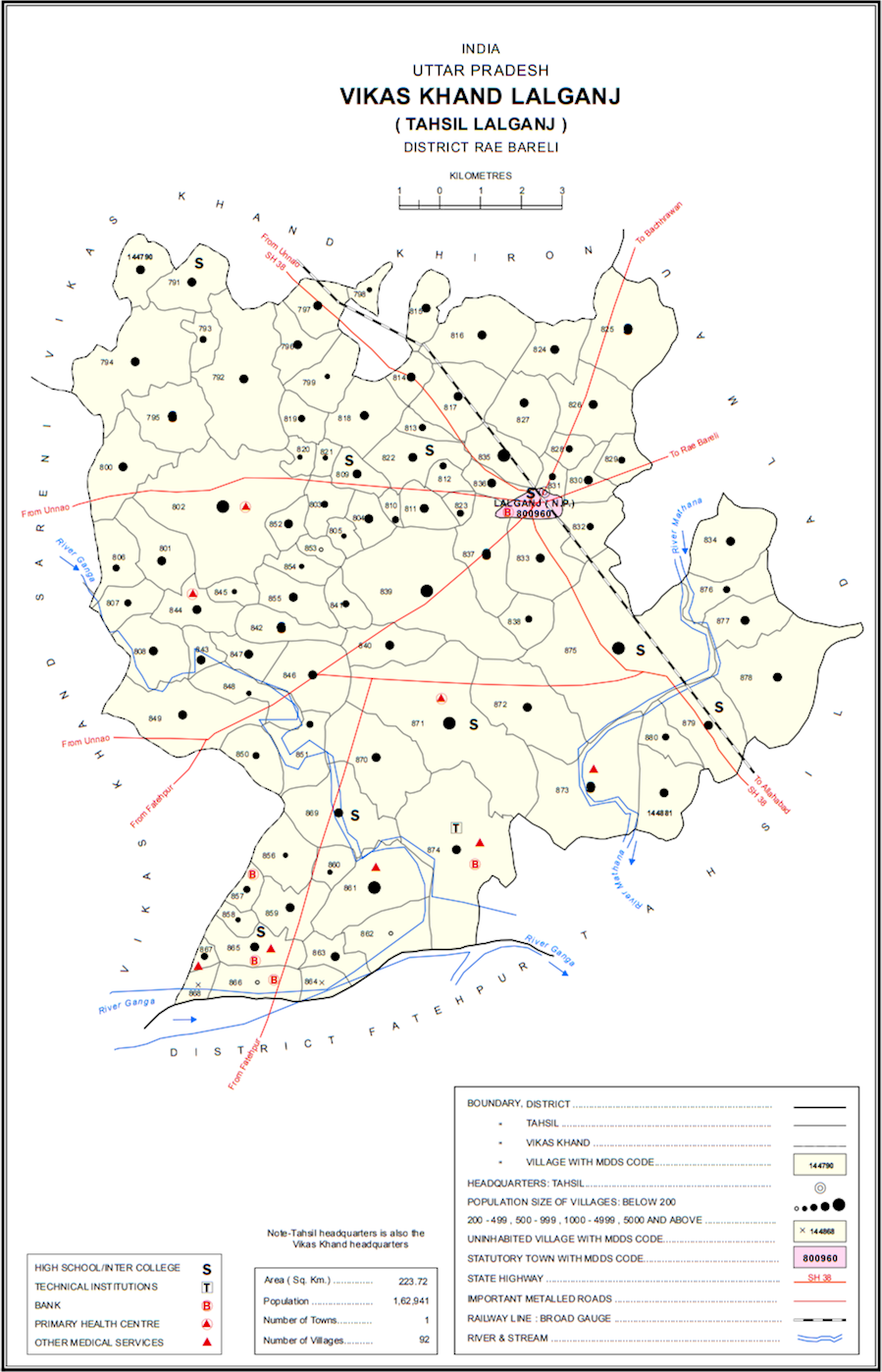
- Map showing Ugabhad (#816) in Lalganj CD block

- Location in Uttar Pradesh, India
- Coordinates: 26.200709°N 80.958396°E
- Country: India
- State: Uttar Pradesh
- District: Raebareli

Area
  - Total: 3.698 km^{2} (1.428 sq mi)

Population (2011)
  - Total: 1,633
  - Density: 441.6/km^{2} (1,144/sq mi)

Languages
  - Official: Hindi
- Time zone: UTC+5:30 (IST)
- Vehicle registration: UP-35

Ugabhad is a village in Lalganj block of Rae Bareli district, Uttar Pradesh, India. It is located 3 km from Lalganj, the block and tehsil headquarters. As of 2011, it has a population of 1,633 people, in 325 households. It has no formal healthcare facilities and hosts a weekly haat but not a permanent market. It belongs to the nyaya panchayat of Mubarakpur.

The 1951 census recorded Ugabhad as comprising 3 hamlets, with a population of 555 people (271 male and 284 female), in 119 households and 105 physical houses. The area of the village was given as 957 acres. 67 residents were literate, 64 male and 3 female. The village was listed as belonging to the pargana of Khiron and the thana of Gurbakshganj.

The 1961 census recorded Ugabhad as comprising 3 hamlets, with a total population of 658 people (327 male and 331 female), in 132 households and 115 physical houses. The area of the village was given as 957 acres.

The 1981 census recorded Ugabhad as having a population of 926 people, in 166 households, and having an area of 391.33 hectares. The main staple foods were listed as wheat and rice.

The 1991 census recorded Ugabhad (as "Uga Bhad") as having a total population of 1,082 people (499 male and 583 female), in 123 households and 123 physical houses. The area of the village was listed as 387 hectares. Members of the 0-6 age group numbered 220, or 20% of the total; this group was 48% male (106) and 52% female (114). Members of scheduled castes made up 42% of the village's population, while no members of scheduled tribes were recorded. The literacy rate of the village was 27.5% (204 men and 94 women). 367 people were classified as main workers (238 men and 129 women), while 65 people were classified as marginal workers (13 men and 52 women); the remaining 650 residents were non-workers. The breakdown of main workers by employment category was as follows: 177 cultivators (i.e. people who owned or leased their own land); 147 agricultural labourers (i.e. people who worked someone else's land in return for payment); 0 workers in livestock, forestry, fishing, hunting, plantations, orchards, etc.; 0 in mining and quarrying; 10 household industry workers; 3 workers employed in other manufacturing, processing, service, and repair roles; 0 construction workers; 0 employed in trade and commerce; 0 employed in transport, storage, and communications; and 40 in other services.
