= Khamauli =

- Village
- Location in Uttar Pradesh, India Khamauli (India)
- Coordinates: 25°53′21″N 82°52′30″E
- Country: India
- State: Uttar Pradesh
- Division: Lalganj
- Established: 2008

Government
  - Type: Democracy

Area
  - Total: 1,993 km^{2} (770 sq mi)

Population (2011)
  - Total: 3,053
  - Density: 1.532/km^{2} (3.968/sq mi)

Languages
  - Official: Hindi
- Time zone: UTC+5:30 (IST)
- ISO 3166 code: IN-UP-KN
- Literacy: 62.3%
- Website: www.kanshiramnagar.nic.in

Khamauli is a village in the Azamgarh district of Uttar Pradesh, India.
