= Madudpur =

- Village
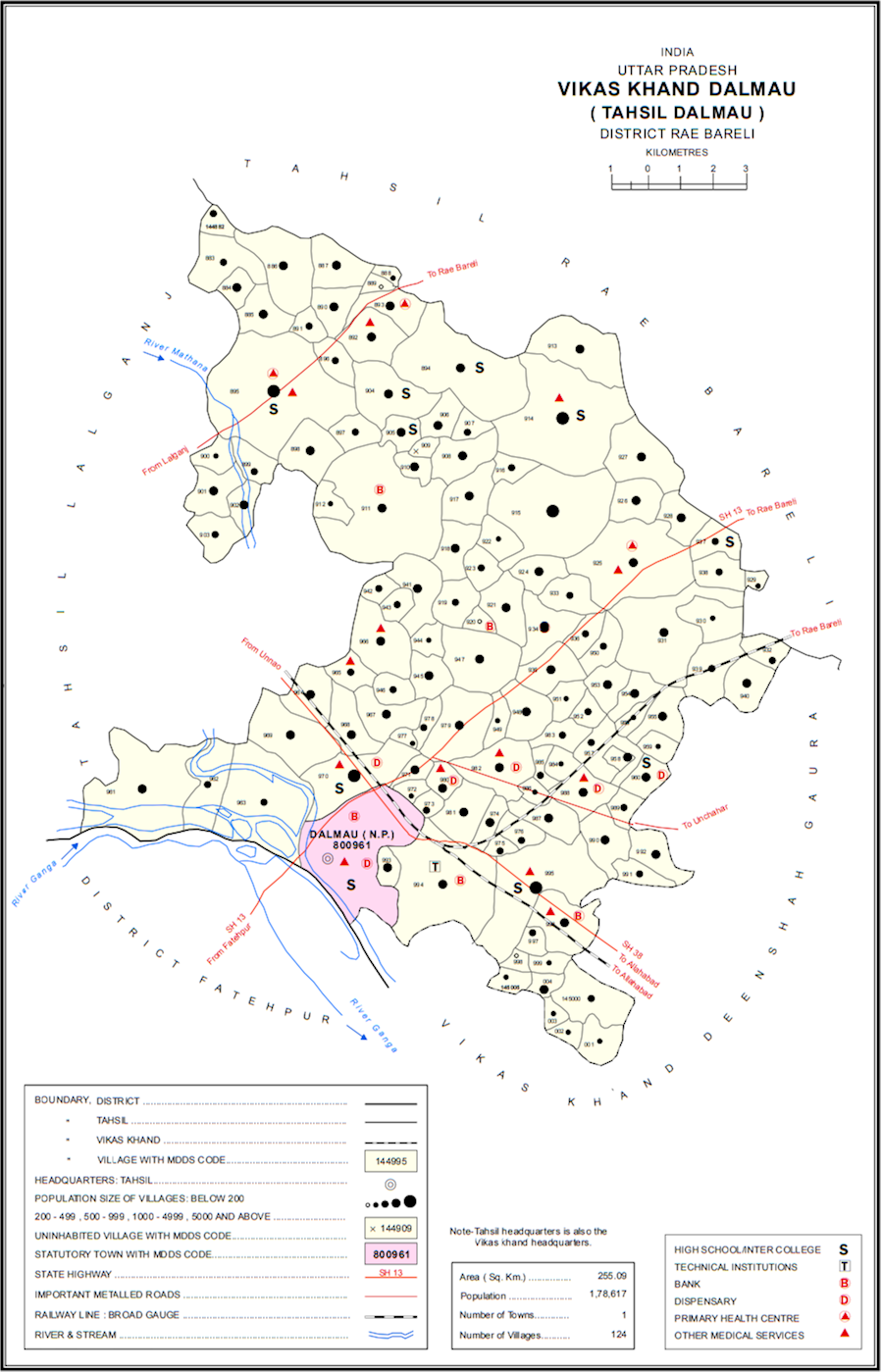
- Map showing Madudpur (#907) in Dalmau CD block

- Location in Uttar Pradesh, India
- Coordinates: 26.174464°N 81.079884°E
- Country India: India
- State: Uttar Pradesh
- District: Raebareli

Area
  - Total: 0.886 km^{2} (0.342 sq mi)

Population (2011)
  - Total: 984
  - Density: 1,110/km^{2} (2,880/sq mi)

Languages
  - Official: Hindi
- Time zone: UTC+5:30 (IST)
- Vehicle registration: UP-35

Madudpur is a village in Dalmau block of Rae Bareli district, Uttar Pradesh, India. The nearest large town is Lalganj, which is 11 km away. As of 2011, it has a population of 984 people, in 178 households. It has one primary school and no healthcare facilities.

The 1961 census recorded Madudpur as comprising 2 hamlets, with a total population of 347 people (152 male and 195 female), in 71 households and 59 physical houses. The area of the village was given as 216 acres.

The 1981 census recorded Madudpur (as "Maddupur") as having a population of 529 people, in 99 households, and having an area of 88.63 hectares. The main staple foods were listed as wheat and rice.
