= Tikran =

Tikran Tikrān
- Village
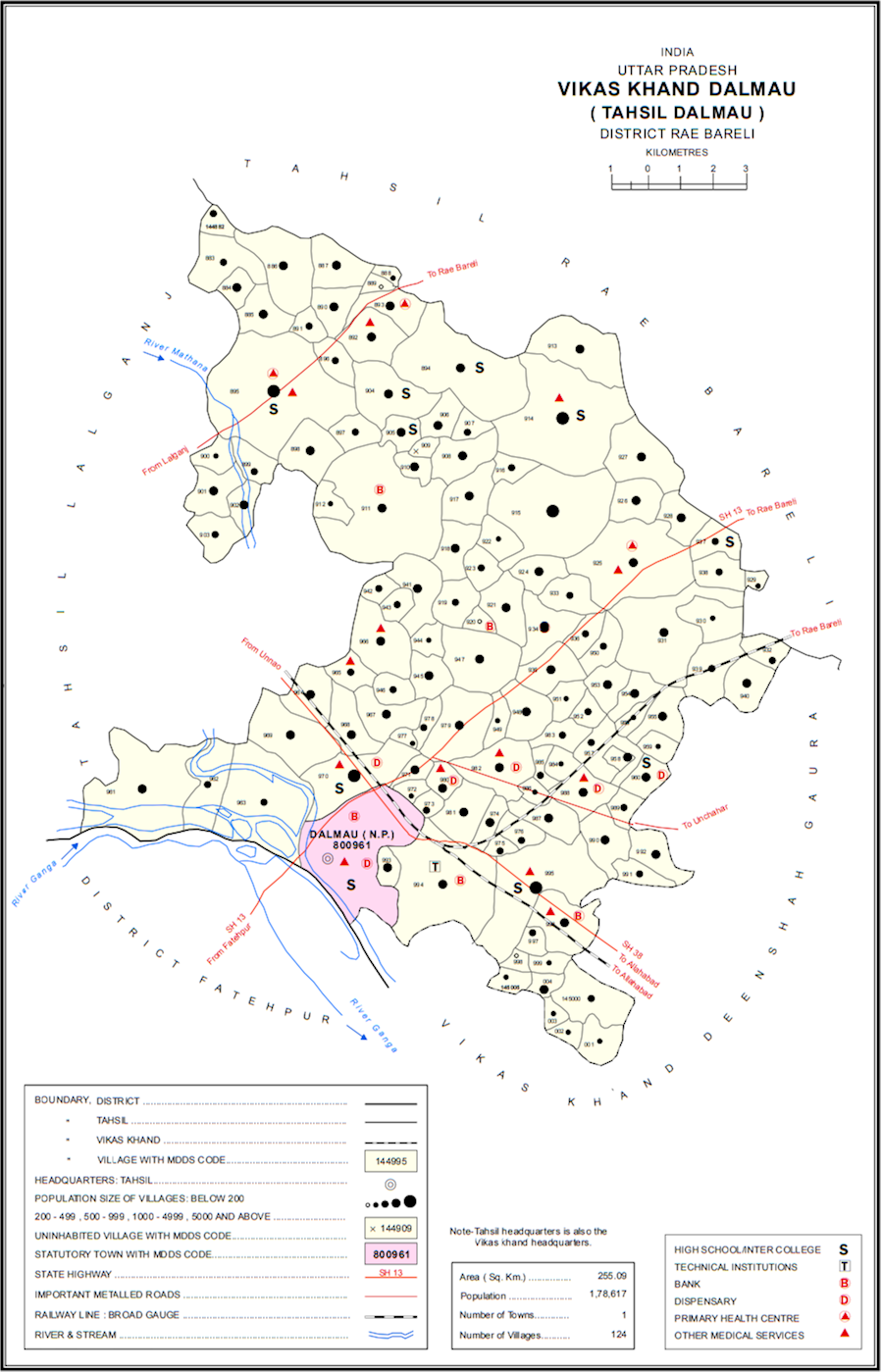
- Map showing Tikran (#884) in Dalmau CD block

- Location in Uttar Pradesh, India
- Coordinates: 26.220369°N 81.008962°E
- Country: India
- State: Uttar Pradesh
- District: Raebareli

Area
  - Total: 1.235 km^{2} (0.477 sq mi)

Population (2011)
  - Total: 1,011
  - Density: 818.6/km^{2} (2,120/sq mi)

Languages
  - Official: Hindi
- Time zone: UTC+5:30 (IST)
- Vehicle registration: UP-35

Tikran is a village in Dalmau block of Rae Bareli district, Uttar Pradesh, India. It is located 8 km from Lalganj, the nearest large town. As of 2011, it has a population of 1,011 people, in 181 households. It has one primary school. The village lacks healthcare facilities, weekly haat or permanent market. It belongs to the nyaya panchayat of Madhukarpur.

The 1951 census recorded Tikran as comprising 3 hamlets, with a population of 317 people (164 male and 153 female), in 67 households and 61 physical houses. The area of the village was given as 299 acres. 11 residents were literate, all male. The village was listed as belonging to the pargana of Dalmau and the thana of Dalmau.

The 1961 census recorded Tikran (as "Tikaran") as comprising 3 hamlets, with a total population of 371 people (191 male and 180 female), in 14 [sic] households and 64 physical houses. The area of the village was given as 299 acres.

The 1981 census recorded Tikran (as "Tikaran") as having a population of 507 people, in 103 households, and having an area of 121.41 hectares. The main staple foods were listed as wheat and rice.

The 1991 census recorded Tikran as having a total population of 558 people (285 male and 273 female), in 105 households and 104 physical houses. The area of the village was listed as 121 hectares. Members of the 0-6 age group numbered 137, or 25% of the total; this group was 62% male (85) and 38% female (52). Members of scheduled castes numbered 355, or 64% of the village's total population, while no members of scheduled tribes were recorded. The literacy rate of the village was 30% (130 men and 39 women). 245 people were classified as main workers (133 men and 112 women), while 0 people were classified as marginal workers; the remaining 313 residents were non-workers. The breakdown of main workers by employment category was as follows: 205 cultivators (i.e. people who owned or leased their own land); 2 agricultural labourers (i.e. people who worked someone else's land in return for payment); 0 workers in livestock, forestry, fishing, hunting, plantations, orchards, etc.; 0 in mining and quarrying; 0 household industry workers; 9 workers employed in other manufacturing, processing, service, and repair roles; 8 construction workers; 13 employed in trade and commerce; 2 employed in transport, storage, and communications; and 6 in other services.
