= Dostpur, Lalganj =

Dostpur
- Village
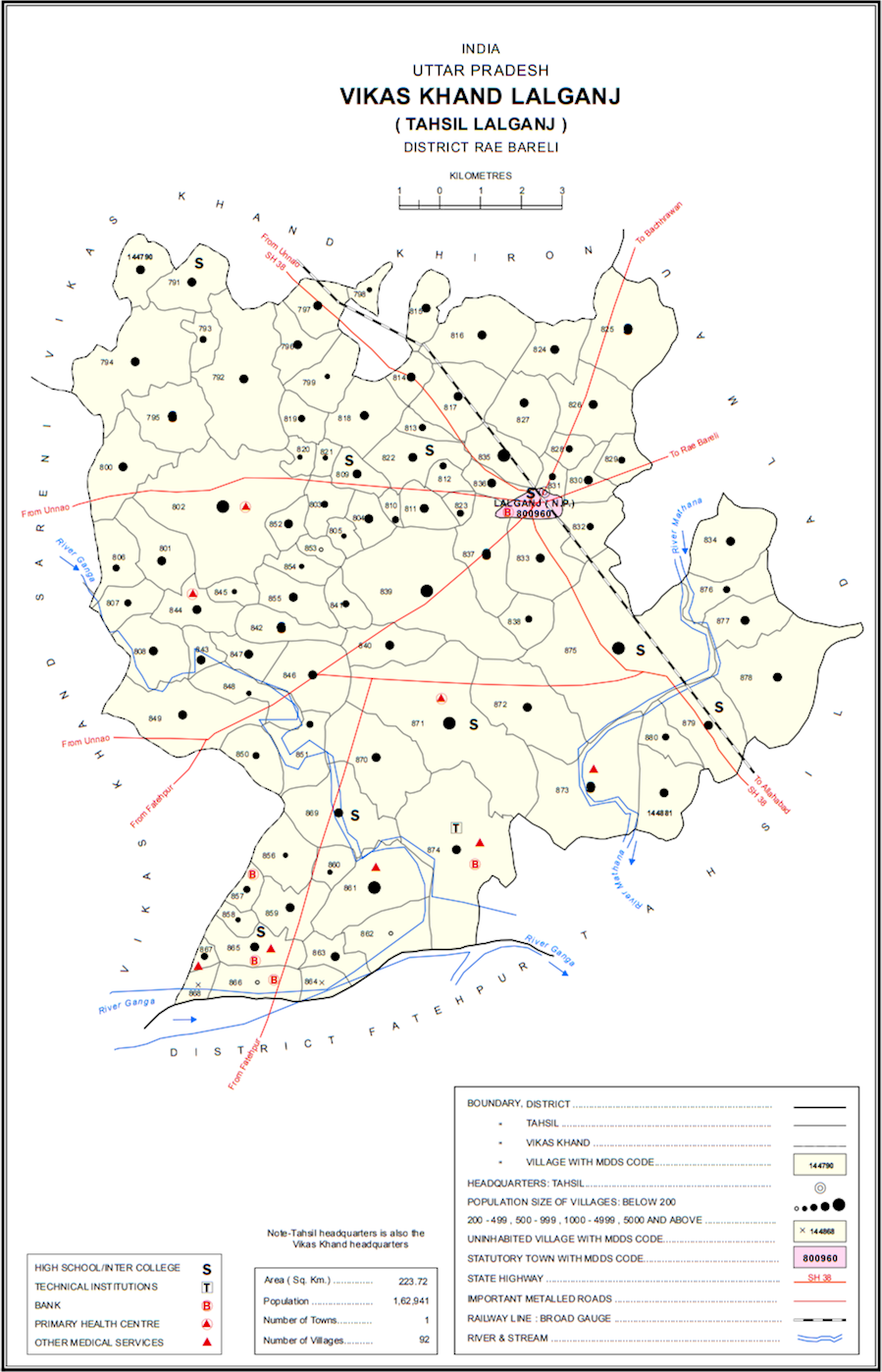
- Map showing Dostpur (#820) in Lalganj CD block

- Location in Uttar Pradesh, India
- Coordinates: 26.178383°N 80.918293°E
- Country India: India
- State: Uttar Pradesh
- District: Raebareli

Area
  - Total: 0.489 km^{2} (0.189 sq mi)

Population (2011)
  - Total: 295
  - Density: 603/km^{2} (1,560/sq mi)

Languages
  - Official: Hindi
- Time zone: UTC+5:30 (IST)
- Vehicle registration: UP-35

Dostpur is a village in Lalganj block of Rae Bareli district, Uttar Pradesh, India. It is located 6 km from Lalganj, the block and tehsil headquarters. As of 2011, it has a population of 295 people, in 59 households. It has one primary school and no healthcare facilities.

The 1961 census recorded Dostpur as comprising 1 hamlet, with a total population of 187 people (94 male and 93 female), in 31 households and 25 physical houses. The area of the village was given as 128 acres.

The 1981 census recorded Dostpur as having a population of 248 people, in 40 households, and having an area of 51.81 hectares. The main staple foods were listed as wheat and rice.
