= Gaura Rupai Pir Alipur =

- Village
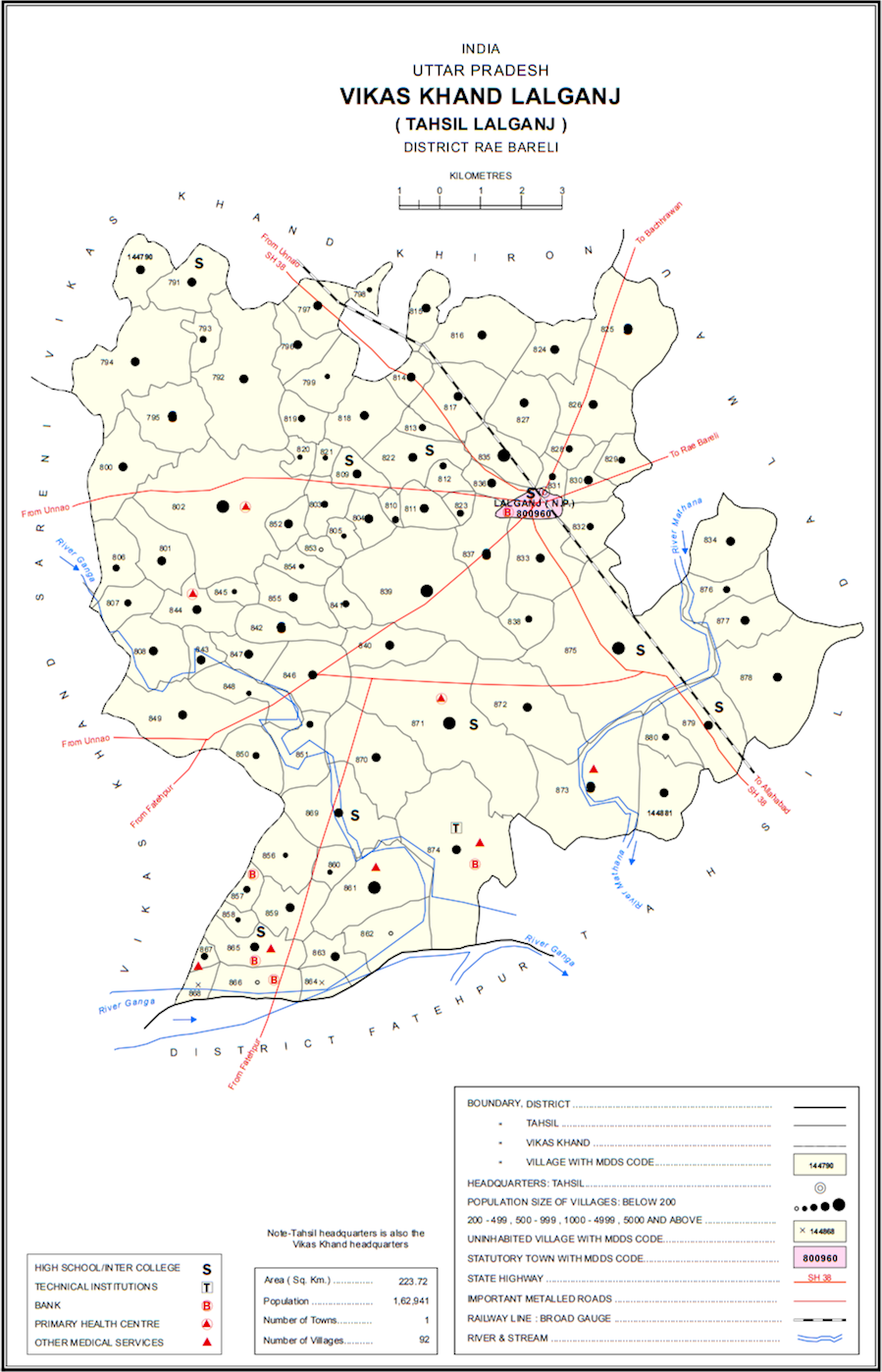
- Map showing Gaura Rupai Pir Alipur (#870) in Lalganj CD block

- Location in Uttar Pradesh, India
- Coordinates: 26.111823°N 80.944265°E
- Country India: India
- State: Uttar Pradesh
- District: Raebareli

Area
  - Total: 4.457 km^{2} (1.721 sq mi)

Population (2011)
  - Total: 3,097
  - Density: 694.9/km^{2} (1,800/sq mi)

Languages
  - Official: Hindi
- Time zone: UTC+5:30 (IST)
- Vehicle registration: UP-35

Gaura Rupai Pir Alipur is a village in Lalganj block of Rae Bareli district, Uttar Pradesh, India. It is located 6 km from Lalganj, the block and tehsil headquarters. As of 2011, it has a population of 3,097 people, in 551 households. It has three primary school and no healthcare facilities.

The 1961 census recorded Gaura Rupai Pir Alipur as comprising 6 hamlets, with a total population of 1,590 people (793 male and 797 female), in 301 households and 271 physical houses. The area of the village was given as 1,108 acres.

The 1981 census recorded Gaura Rupai Pir Alipur (as "Gaura Rupaipeer Alipur") as having a population of 2,034 people, in 376 households, and having an area of 612.70 hectares. The main staple foods were listed as wheat and rice.
