= Kankapur =

Kankapur Kankāpur
- Village
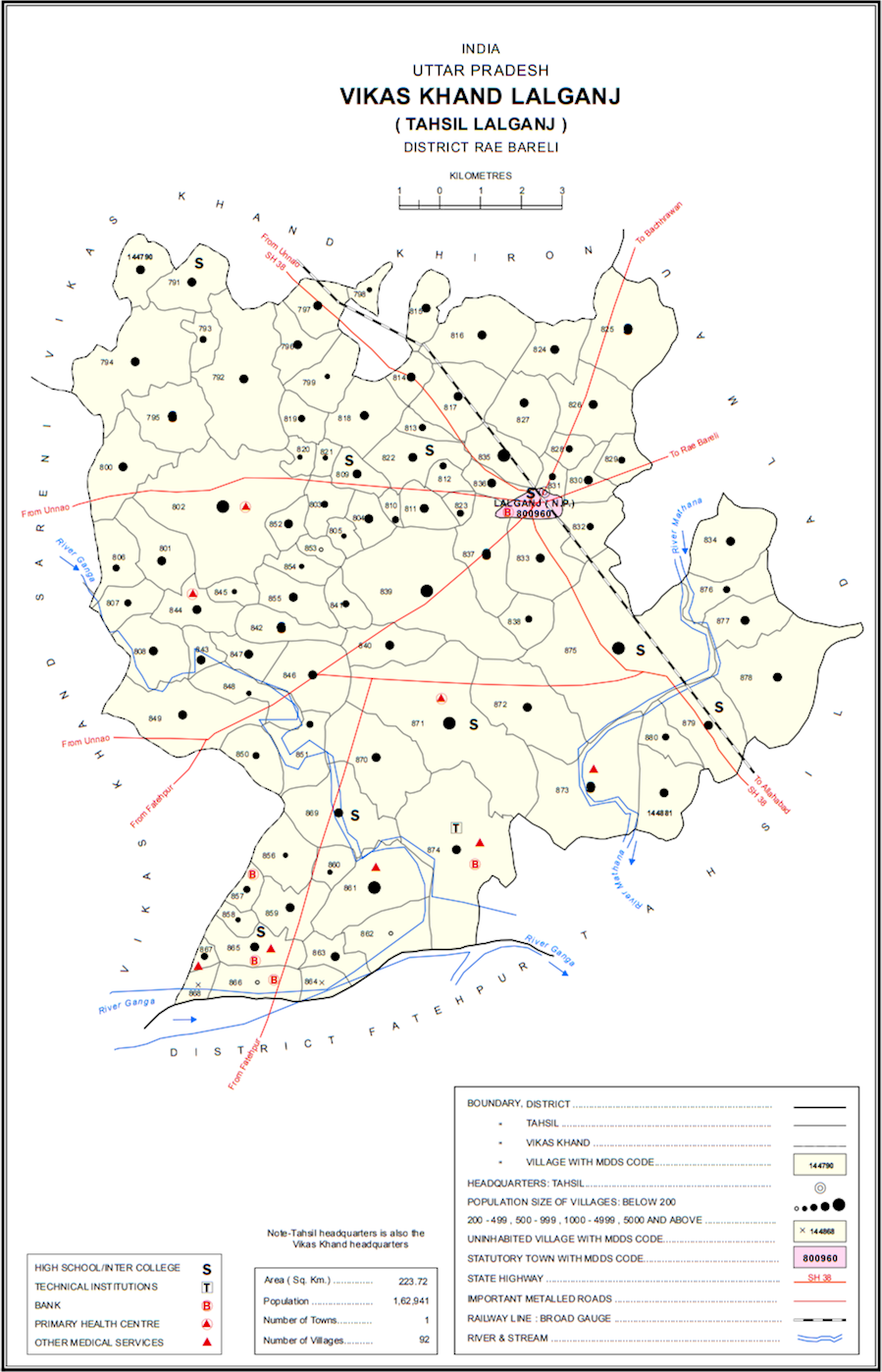
- Map showing Kankapur (#850) in Lalganj CD block

- Location in Uttar Pradesh, India
- Coordinates: 26.110155°N 80.909514°E
- Country India: India
- State: Uttar Pradesh
- District: Raebareli

Area
  - Total: 1.498 km^{2} (0.578 sq mi)

Population (2011)
  - Total: 516
  - Density: 344/km^{2} (892/sq mi)

Languages
  - Official: Hindi
- Time zone: UTC+5:30 (IST)
- Vehicle registration: UP-35

Kankapur is a village in Lalganj block of Rae Bareli district, Uttar Pradesh, India. It is located 9 km from Lalganj, the block and tehsil headquarters. As of 2011, it has a population of 516 people, in 78 households. It has one primary school and no healthcare facilities.

The 1961 census recorded Kankapur as comprising 1 hamlet, with a total population of 286 people (133 male and 153 female), in 48 households and 48 physical houses. The area of the village was given as 379 acres.

The 1981 census recorded Kankapur as having a population of 418 people, in 62 households, and having an area of 153.37 hectares. The main staple foods were listed as wheat and rice.
