= Golhamau =

Golhamau Golhāmau
- Village
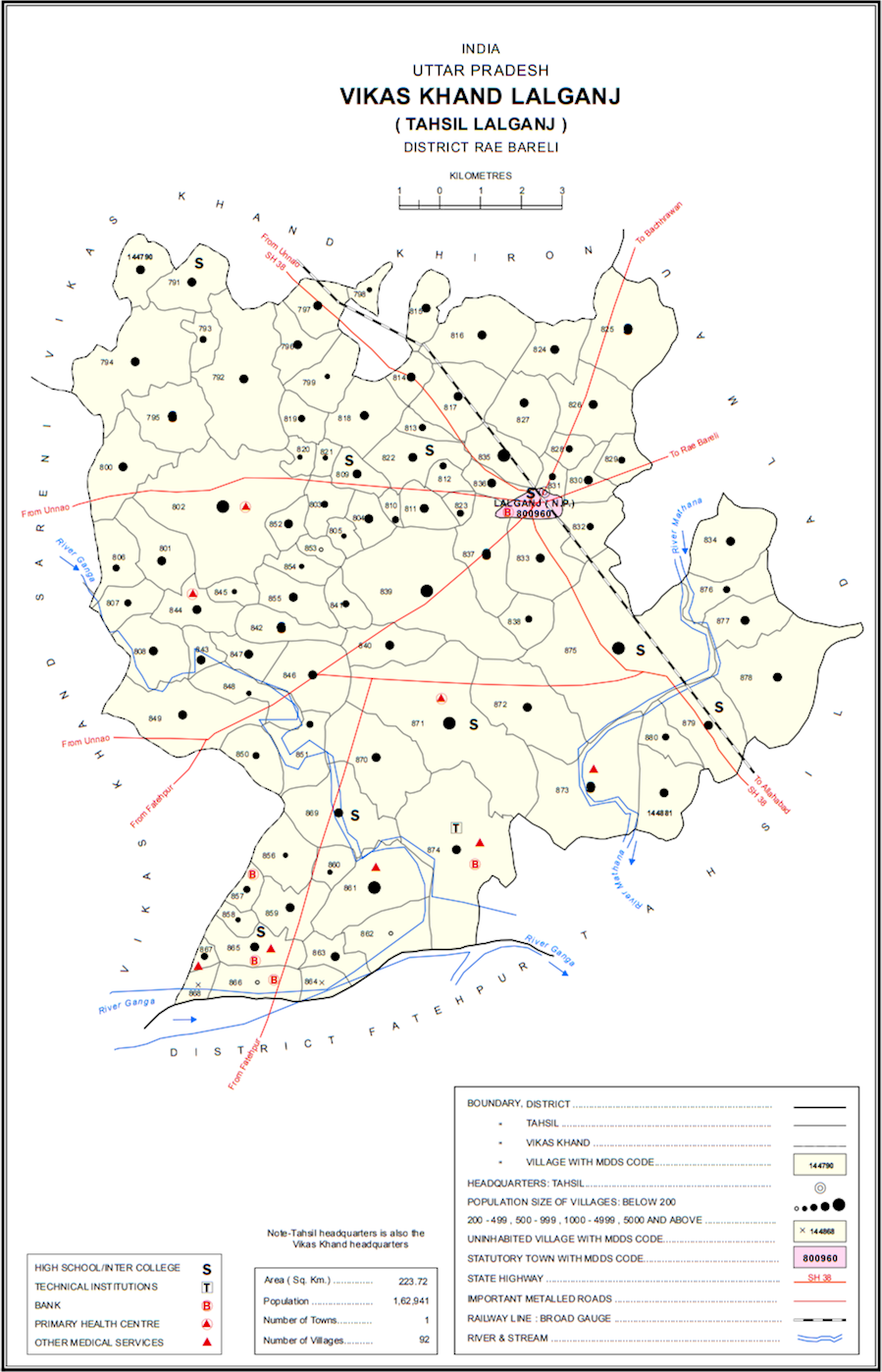
- Map showing Golhamau (#854) in Lalganj CD block

- Location in Uttar Pradesh, India
- Coordinates: 26.155235°N 80.914805°E
- Country: India
- State: Uttar Pradesh
- District: Raebareli

Area
  - Total: 0.741 km^{2} (0.286 sq mi)

Population (2011)
  - Total: 360
  - Density: 490/km^{2} (1,300/sq mi)

Languages
  - Official: Hindi
- Time zone: UTC+5:30 (IST)
- Vehicle registration: UP-35

Golhamau is a village in Lalganj block of Rae Bareli district, Uttar Pradesh, India. It is located 6 km from Lalganj, the block and tehsil headquarters. As of 2011, it has a population of 360 people, in 61 households. The village has no school, healthcare facilities, permanent market or weekly haat. It belongs to the nyaya panchayat of Bahuria Khera.

The 1951 census recorded Golhamau (as "Golha Mau") as comprising 3 hamlets, with a population of 142 people (66 male and 76 female), in 25 households and 18 physical houses. The area of the village was given as 170 acres. 1 resident was literate, a male. The village was listed as belonging to the pargana of Sareni and the thana of Sareni .

The 1961 census recorded Golhamau as comprising 2 hamlets, with a total population of 174 people (79 male and 95 female), in 30 households and 25 physical houses. The area of the village was given as 170 acres.

The 1981 census recorded Golhamau as having a population of 202 people, in 40 households, and having an area of 74.06 hectares. The main staple foods were listed as wheat and rice.

The 1991 census recorded Golhamau (as "Golha Mau") as having a total population of 192 people (86 male and 106 female), in 33 households and 33 physical houses. The area of the village was listed as 74 hectares. Members of the 0-6 age group numbered 42, or 22% of the total; this group was 45% male (19) and 55% female (23). No members of scheduled castes or scheduled tribes were recorded. The literacy rate of the village was 25% (32 men and 16 women). 53 people were classified as main workers (50 men and 3 women), while 1 person was classified as a marginal worker (a woman); the remaining 138 residents were non-workers. The breakdown of main workers by employment category was as follows: 39 cultivators (i.e. people who owned or leased their own land); 5 agricultural labourers (i.e. people who worked someone else's land in return for payment); 5 workers in livestock, forestry, fishing, hunting, plantations, orchards, etc.; 0 in mining and quarrying; 0 household industry workers; 2 workers employed in other manufacturing, processing, service, and repair roles; 1 construction worker; 0 employed in trade and commerce; 0 employed in transport, storage, and communications; and 1 in other services.
