= Bannamau =

Bannamau Bannāmau
- Village
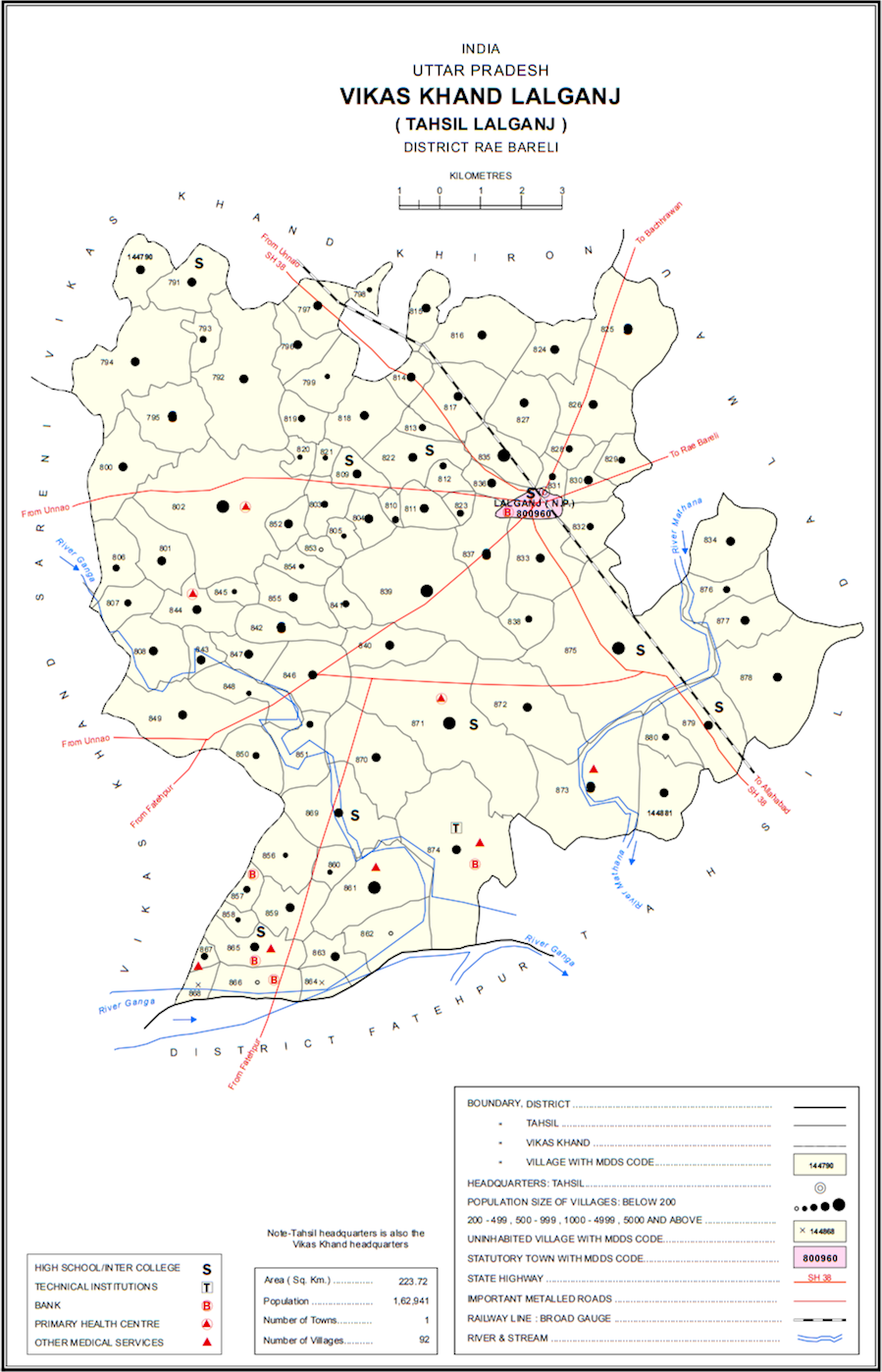
- Map showing Bannamau (#826) in Lalganj CD block

- Location in Uttar Pradesh, India
- Coordinates: 26.192286°N 80.983793°E
- Country India: India
- State: Uttar Pradesh
- District: Raebareli

Area
  - Total: 2.46 km^{2} (0.95 sq mi)

Population (2011)
  - Total: 1,862
  - Density: 757/km^{2} (1,960/sq mi)

Languages
  - Official: Hindi
- Time zone: UTC+5:30 (IST)
- Vehicle registration: UP-35

Bannamau is a village in Lalganj block of Rae Bareli district, Uttar Pradesh, India. It is located 2 km from Lalganj, the block and tehsil headquarters. As of 2011, it has a population of 1,862 people, in 363 households. It has one primary school and no healthcare facilities.

The 1961 census recorded Bannamau as comprising 5 hamlets, with a total population of 745 people (330 male and 415 female), in 140 households and 121 physical houses. The area of the village was given as 644 acres.

The 1981 census recorded Bannamau as having a population of 1,035 people, in 186 households, and having an area of 248.05 hectares. The main staple foods were listed as wheat and rice.
