= Tila capsophilella =

Scientific classification
- Domain: Eukaryota
- Kingdom: Animalia
- Phylum: Arthropoda
- Class: Insecta
- Order: Lepidoptera
- Family: Gelechiidae
- Genus: Tila
- Species: T. capsophilella

Binomial name
- Tila capsophilella (Chrétien, 1900)

Synonyms
- Lita capsophilella Chrétien, 1900

Species of moth

Tila capsophilella is a moth in the family Gelechiidae. It was described by Pierre Chrétien in 1900. It is found in the Alps of Austria, Switzerland and France, as well as in southern Germany.

The wingspan is 10–11 mm.

The larvae feed on Gypsophila repens.
