= Rajauli, Raebareli =

Rajauli
- Village
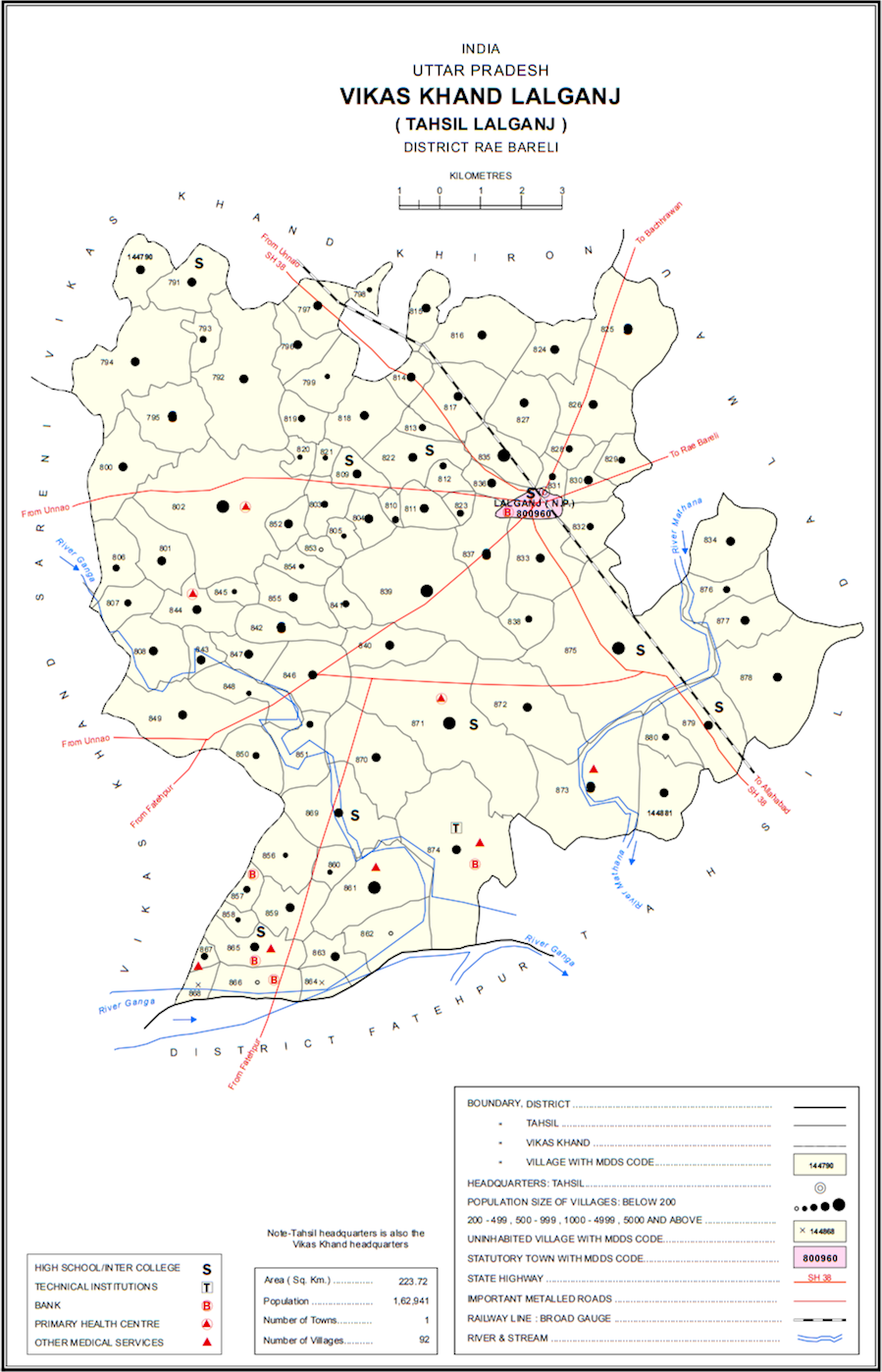
- Map showing Rajauli (#144881) in Lalganj CD block

- Location in Uttar Pradesh, India
- Coordinates: 26.10622°N 80.004513°E
- Country India: India
- State: Uttar Pradesh
- District: Raebareli

Area
  - Total: 0.876 km^{2} (0.338 sq mi)

Population (2011)
  - Total: 1,915
  - Density: 2,190/km^{2} (5,660/sq mi)

Languages
  - Official: Hindi
- Time zone: UTC+5:30 (IST)
- Vehicle registration: UP-35

Rajauli is a village in the Lalganj block of Rae Bareli district, Uttar Pradesh, India. As of 2011, it has a population of 1,915 people, in 338 households. Rajauli has no schools, healthcare facilities, weekly haat or a permanent market. It belongs to the nyaya panchayat of Bahai.

The 1951 census recorded Rajauli as comprising 7 hamlets, with a population of 689 people (344 male and 345 female), in 128 households and 126 physical houses. The area of the village was given as 745 acres. 34 residents were literate, all male. The village was listed as belonging to the pargana of Dalmau and the thana of Dalmau.

The 1961 census recorded Rajauli as comprising 7 hamlets, with a total population of 860 people (443 male and 417 female), in 163 households and 156 physical houses. The area of the village was given as 745 acres.

The 1981 census recorded Rajauli as having a population of 1,140 people, in 215 households, and having an area of 212.45 hectares. The main staple foods were listed as wheat and rice.

The 1991 census recorded Rajauli as having a total population of 1,383 people (648 male and 735 female), in 255 households and 253 physical houses. The area of the village was listed as 298 hectares. Members of the 0-6 age group numbered 314, or 23% of the total; this group was 47% male (147) and 53% female (167). Members of scheduled castes made up 25% of the village's population, while no members of scheduled tribes were recorded. The literacy rate of the village was 25% (238 men and 114 women). 382 people were classified as main workers (326 men and 56 women), while 296 people were classified as marginal workers (all women); the remaining 705 residents were non-workers. The breakdown of main workers by employment category was as follows: 267 cultivators (i.e. people who owned or leased their own land); 61 agricultural labourers (i.e. people who worked someone else's land in return for payment); 3 workers in livestock, forestry, fishing, hunting, plantations, orchards, etc.; 0 in mining and quarrying; 0 household industry workers; 17 workers employed in other manufacturing, processing, service, and repair roles; 0 construction workers; 10 employed in trade and commerce; 4 employed in transport, storage, and communications; and 20 in other services.
