= Maidemau =

- Village
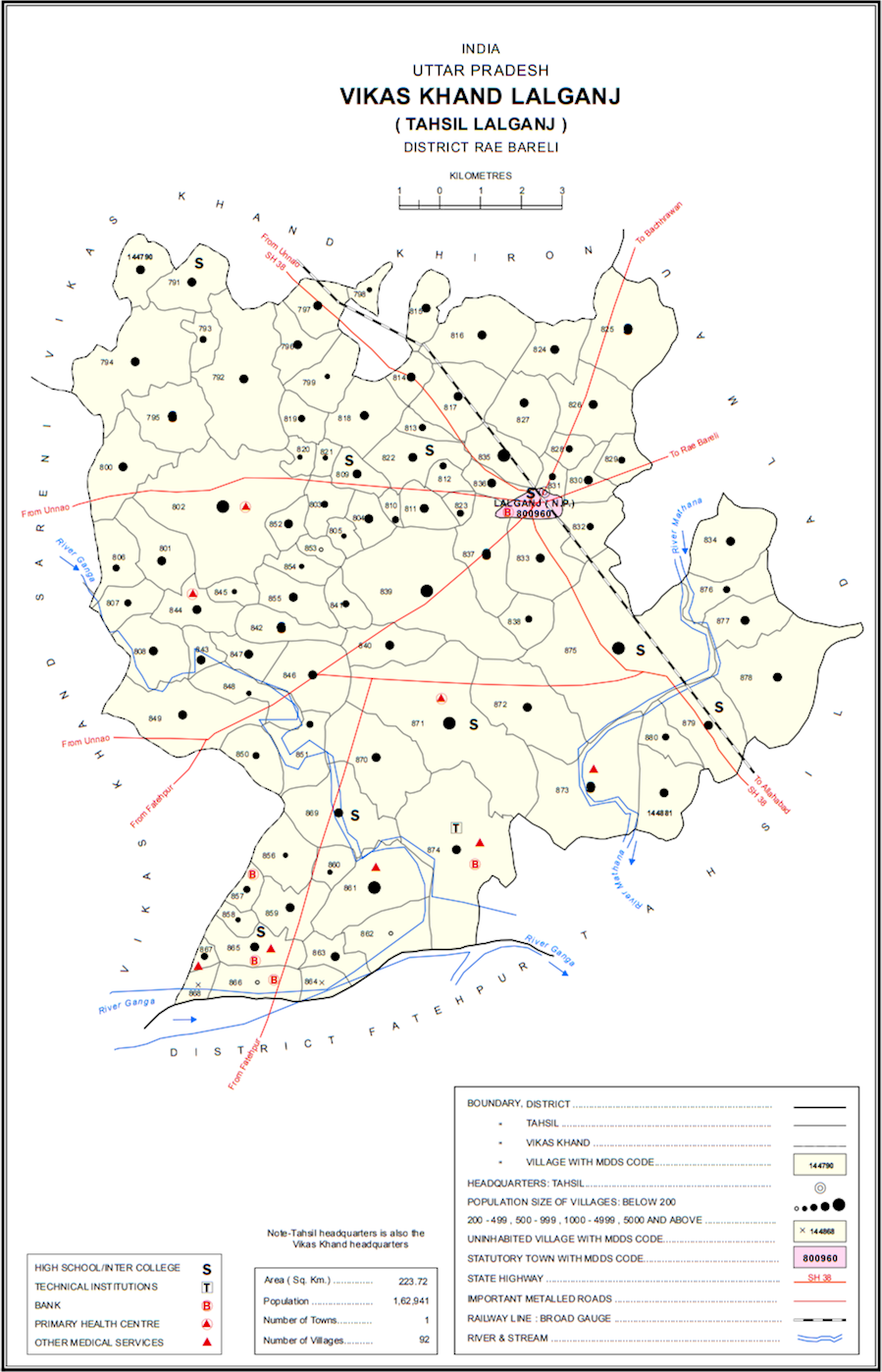
- Map showing Maidemau (#847) in Lalganj CD block

- Location in Uttar Pradesh, India
- Coordinates: 26.134094°N 80.901537°E
- Country India: India
- State: Uttar Pradesh
- District: Raebareli

Area
  - Total: 1.572 km^{2} (0.607 sq mi)

Population (2011)
  - Total: 1,027
  - Density: 653.3/km^{2} (1,692/sq mi)

Languages
  - Official: Hindi
- Time zone: UTC+5:30 (IST)
- Vehicle registration: UP-35

Maidemau is a village in Lalganj block of Rae Bareli district, Uttar Pradesh, India. It is located 9 km from Lalganj, the block and tehsil headquarters. As of 2011, it has a population of 1,027 people, in 186 households. It has one primary school and no healthcare facilities.

The 1961 census recorded Maidemau as comprising 3 hamlets, with a total population of 562 people (263 male and 299 female), in 93 households and 71 physical houses. The area of the village was given as 360 acres and it had a library at that point.

The 1981 census recorded Maidemau as having a population of 740 people, in 125 households, and having an area of 146.09 hectares. The main staple foods were listed as wheat and rice.
