= Sandi, Raebareli =

Sandi Sāndi
- Village
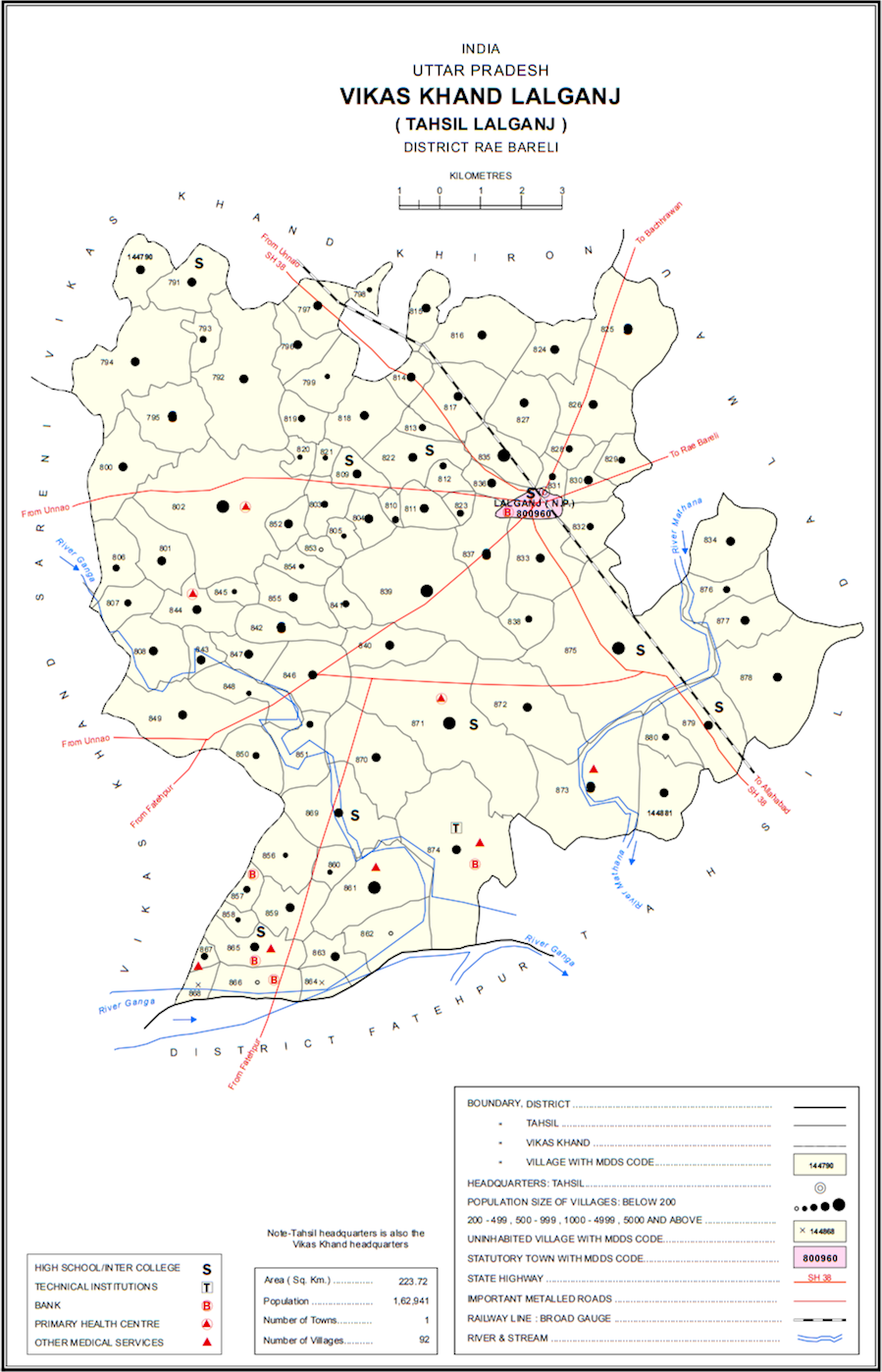
- Map showing Sandi (#845) in Lalganj CD block

- Location in Uttar Pradesh, India
- Coordinates: 26.14724°N 80.903549°E
- Country India: India
- State: Uttar Pradesh
- District: Raebareli

Area
  - Total: 0.501 km^{2} (0.193 sq mi)

Population (2011)
  - Total: 228
  - Density: 455/km^{2} (1,180/sq mi)

Languages
  - Official: Hindi and English
- Time zone: UTC+5:30 (IST)
- Vehicle registration: UP-33

Sandi is a village in Lalganj block of Rae Bareli district, Uttar Pradesh, India. It is located 10 km from Lalganj, the block and tehsil headquarters. As of 2011, it has a population of 228 people, in 39 households. It has one school and no healthcare facilities.

The 1961 census recorded Sandi as comprising 1 hamlet, with a total population of 116 people (57 male and 59 female), in 30 households and 23 physical houses. The area of the village was given as 125 acres and it had a medical practitioner at that point.

The 1981 census recorded Sandi as having a population of 145 people, in 20 households, and having an area of 50.58 hectares. The main staple foods were listed as wheat and rice.
