= Chanda Tikar =

Chanda Tikar Chānda Tikar
- Village
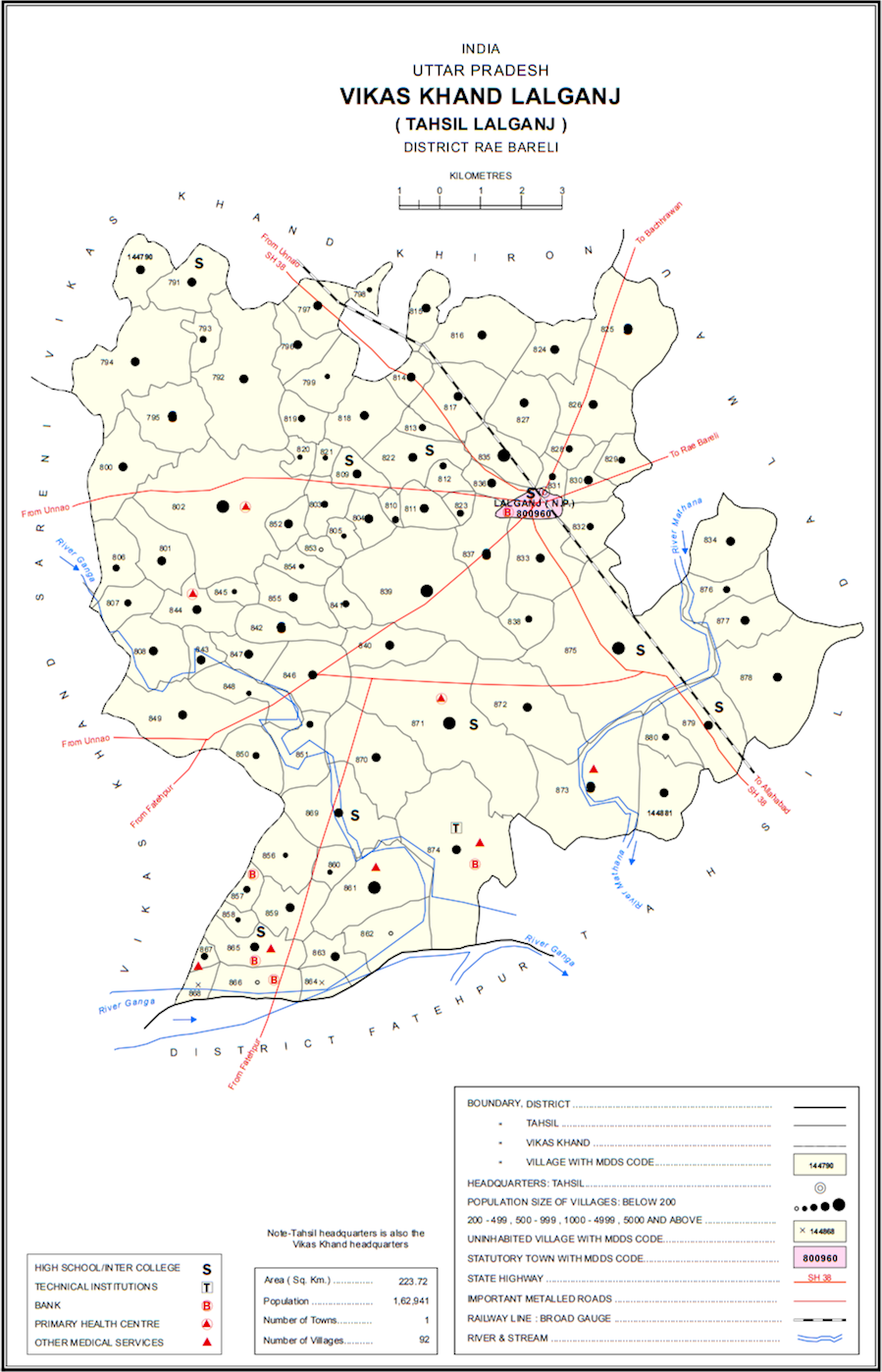
- Map showing Chanda Tikar (#879) in Lalganj CD block

- Location in Uttar Pradesh, India
- Coordinates: 26.120391°N 81.011316°E
- Country India: India
- State: Uttar Pradesh
- District: Raebareli

Area
  - Total: 3.009 km^{2} (1.162 sq mi)

Population (2011)
  - Total: 2,156
  - Density: 716.5/km^{2} (1,856/sq mi)

Languages
  - Official: Hindi
- Time zone: UTC+5:30 (IST)
- Vehicle registration: UP-35

Chanda Tikar is a village in Lalganj block of Rae Bareli district, Uttar Pradesh, India. As of 2011, it has a population of 2,156 people, in 377 households. It has one primary school and no healthcare facilities.

The 1961 census recorded Chanda Tikar as comprising 8 hamlets, with a total population of 991 people (501 male and 490 female), in 178 households and 144 physical houses. The area of the village was given as 709 acres.

The 1981 census recorded Chanda Tikar as having a population of 1,447 people, in 250 households, and having an area of 300.68 hectares. The main staple foods were listed as wheat and rice.
