= Utra Gauri =

- Village
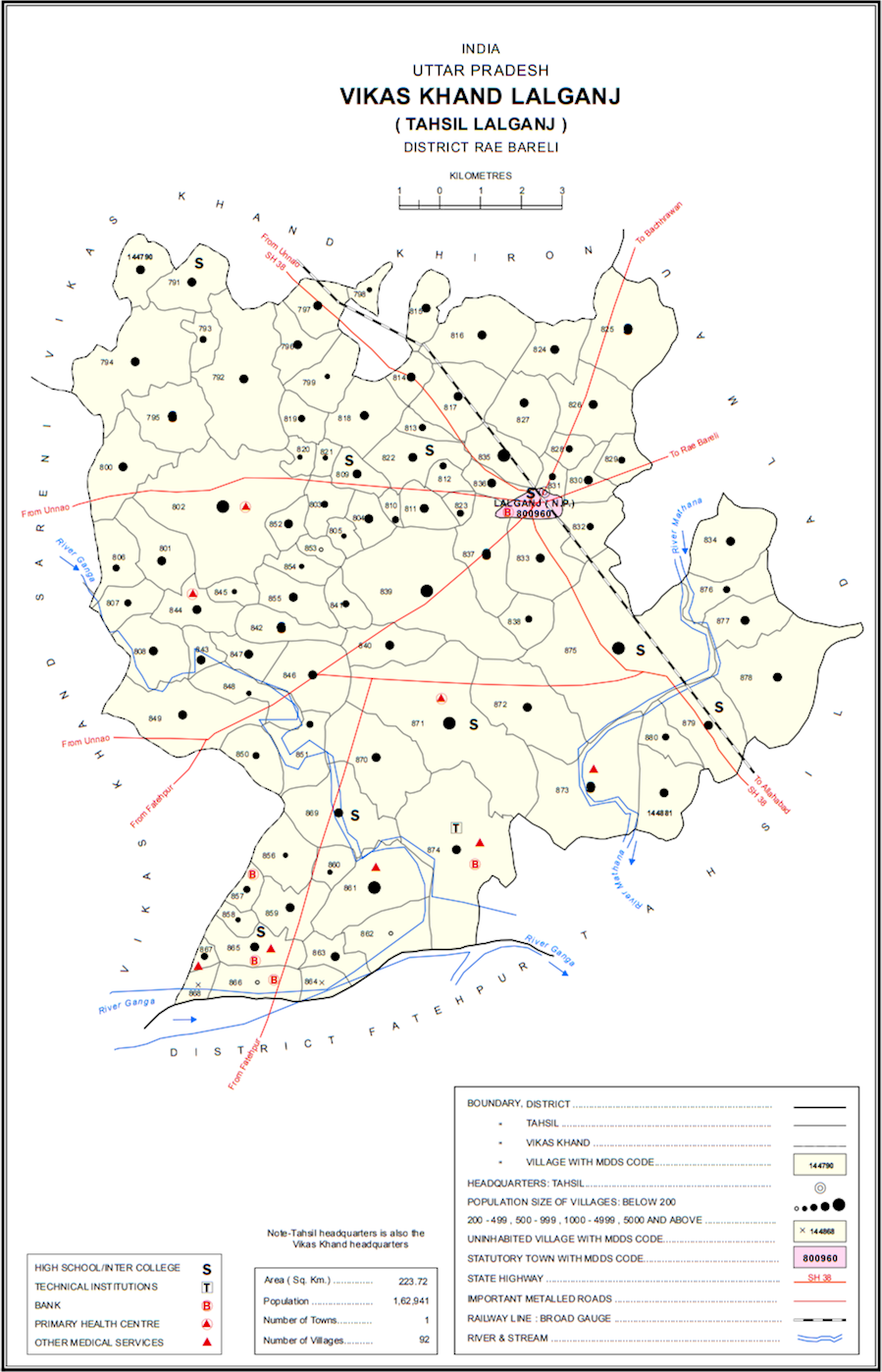
- Map showing Utra Gauri (#872) in Lalganj CD block

- Location in Uttar Pradesh, India
- Coordinates: 26.118279°N 80.9797°E
- Country India: India
- State: Uttar Pradesh
- District: Raebareli

Area
  - Total: 4.88 km^{2} (1.88 sq mi)

Population (2011)
  - Total: 3,630
  - Density: 744/km^{2} (1,930/sq mi)

Languages
  - Official: Hindi
- Time zone: UTC+5:30 (IST)
- Vehicle registration: UP-35

Utra Gauri is a village in Lalganj block of Rae Bareli district, Uttar Pradesh, India. It is located 5 km from Lalganj, the block and tehsil headquarters. As of 2011, it has a population of 3,630 people, in 643 households. It has three primary schools and no healthcare facilities.

The 1961 census recorded Utra Gauri as comprising 6 hamlets, with a total population of 1,787 people (924 male and 863 female), in 309 households and 288 physical houses. The area of the village was given as 1,187 acres.

The 1981 census recorded Utra Gauri as having a population of 2,449 people, in 436 households, and having an area of 484.01 hectares. The main staple foods were listed as wheat and rice.
