= Champatpur =

- Village
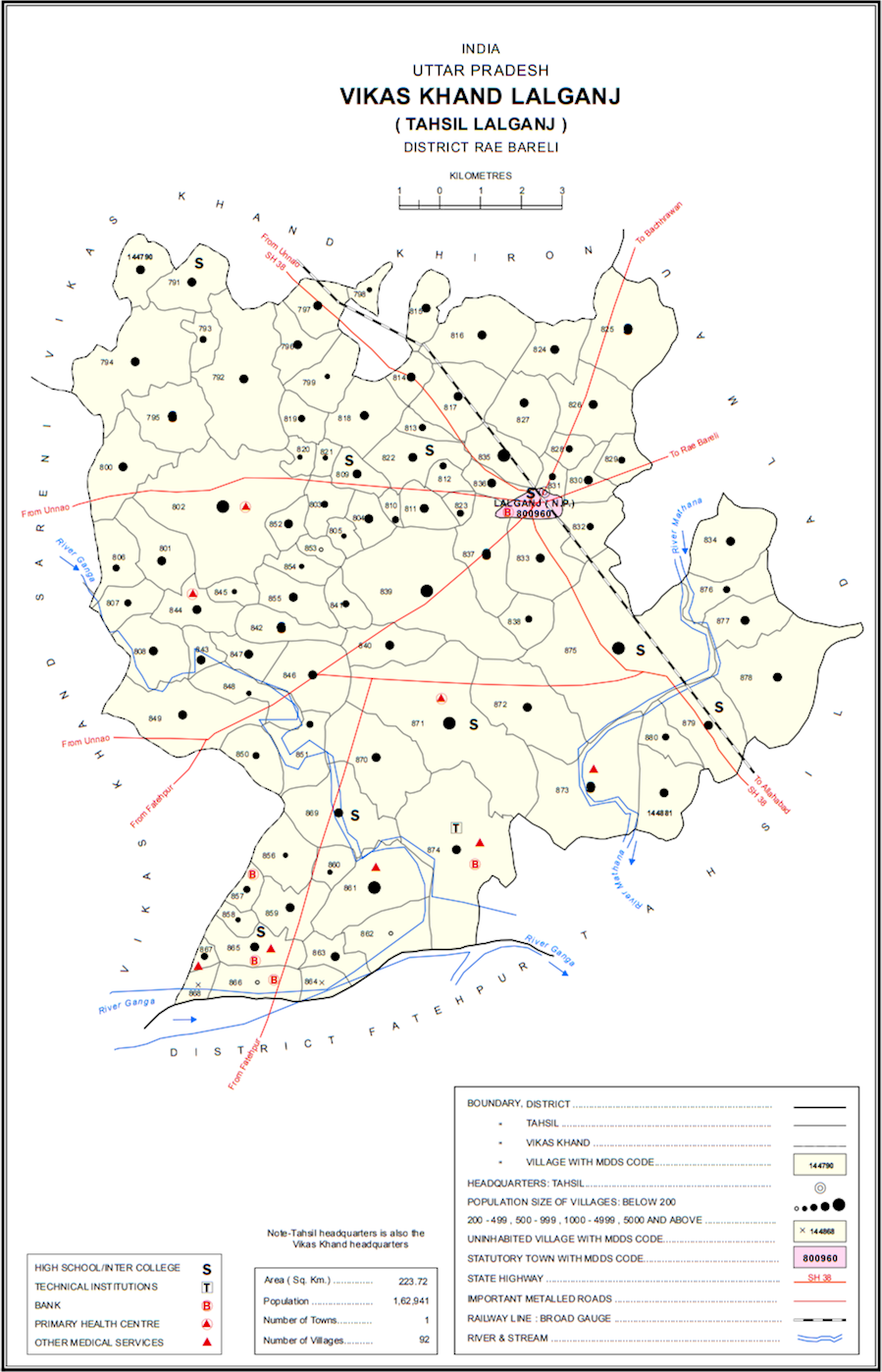
- Map showing Champatpur (#807) in Lalganj CD block

- Location in Uttar Pradesh, India
- Coordinates: 26.143947°N 80.873612°E
- Country: India
- State: Uttar Pradesh
- District: Raebareli

Area
  - Total: 1.338 km^{2} (0.517 sq mi)

Population (2011)
  - Total: 685
  - Density: 512/km^{2} (1,330/sq mi)

Languages
  - Official: Hindi
- Time zone: UTC+5:30 (IST)
- Vehicle registration: UP-35

Champatpur is a village in Lalganj block of Rae Bareli district, Uttar Pradesh, India. It is located 8 km from Lalganj, the block and tehsil headquarters. As of 2011, it has a population of 685 people, in 122 households. It has no healthcare facilities and does not host a permanent market or a weekly haat. It belongs to the nyaya panchayat of Behta Kalan.

The 1951 census recorded Champatpur as comprising 2 hamlets, with a total population of 313 people (148 male and 165 female), in 62 households and 50 physical houses. The area of the village was given as 344 acres. 14 residents were literate, all male. The village was listed as belonging to the pargana of Sareni and the thana of Sareni.

The 1961 census recorded Champatpur as comprising 2 hamlets, with a total population of 381 people (187 male and 194 female), in 68 households and 61 physical houses. The area of the village was given as 344 acres.

The 1981 census recorded Champatpur as having a population of 490 people, in 91 households, and having an area of 134.76 hectares. The main staple foods were listed as wheat and rice.

The 1991 census recorded Champatpur as having a total population of 529 people (272 male and 257 female), in 94 households and 94 physical houses. The area of the village was listed as 135 hectares. Members of the 0-6 age group numbered 89, or 17% of the total; this group was 47% male (42) and 53% female (47). Members of scheduled castes made up 40% of the village's population, while no members of scheduled tribes were recorded. The literacy rate of the village was 46.5% (162 men and 84 women). 142 people were classified as main workers (all men), while 0 people were classified as marginal workers; the remaining 387 residents were non-workers. The breakdown of main workers by employment category was as follows: 78 cultivators (i.e. people who owned or leased their own land); 64 agricultural labourers (i.e. people who worked someone else's land in return for payment); 0 workers in livestock, forestry, fishing, hunting, plantations, orchards, etc.; 0 in mining and quarrying; 0 household industry workers; 0 workers employed in other manufacturing, processing, service, and repair roles; 0 construction workers; 0 employed in trade and commerce; 0 employed in transport, storage, and communications; and 0 in other services.
