= Lalumau =

Lalumau Lālumau
- Village
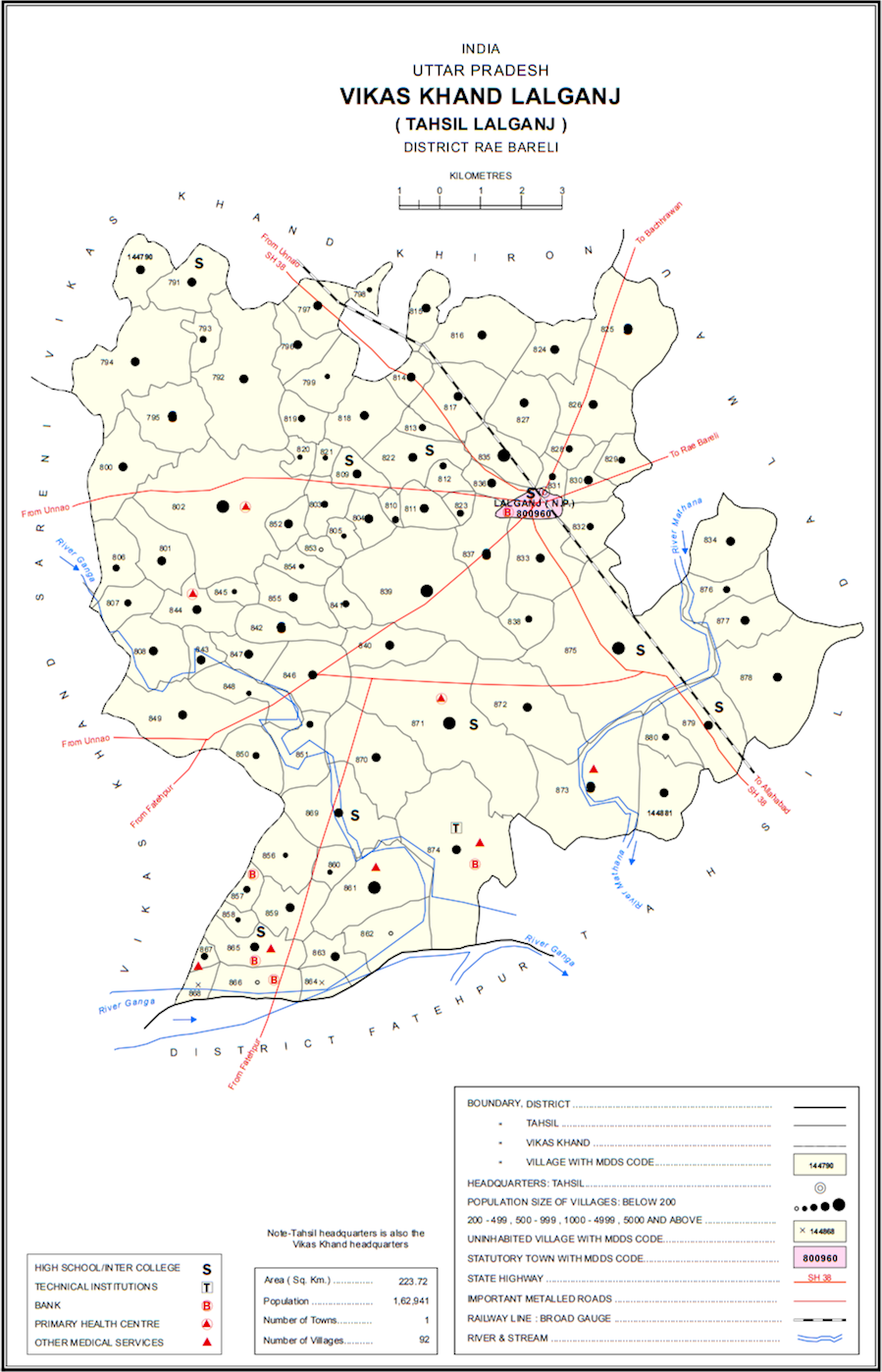
- Map showing Lalumau (#869) in Lalganj CD block

- Location in Uttar Pradesh, India
- Coordinates: 26.10111°N 80.928326°E
- Country India: India
- State: Uttar Pradesh
- District: Raebareli

Area
  - Total: 3.922 km^{2} (1.514 sq mi)

Population (2011)
  - Total: 1,852
  - Density: 472.2/km^{2} (1,223/sq mi)

Languages
  - Official: Hindi
- Time zone: UTC+5:30 (IST)
- Vehicle registration: UP-35

Lalumau is a village in Lalganj block of Rae Bareli district, Uttar Pradesh, India. It is located 6 km from Lalganj, the block and tehsil headquarters. As of 2011, it has a population of 1,852 people, in 336 households. It has two primary schools and no healthcare facilities.

The 1961 census recorded Lalumau as comprising 7 hamlets, with a total population of 740 people (373 male and 367 female), in 139 households and 126 physical houses. The area of the village was given as 970 acres.

The 1981 census recorded Lalumau as having a population of 1,000 people, in 191 households, and having an area of 392.55 hectares. The main staple foods were listed as wheat and juwar.
