= Udwamau =

Udwamau Udwāmau
- Village
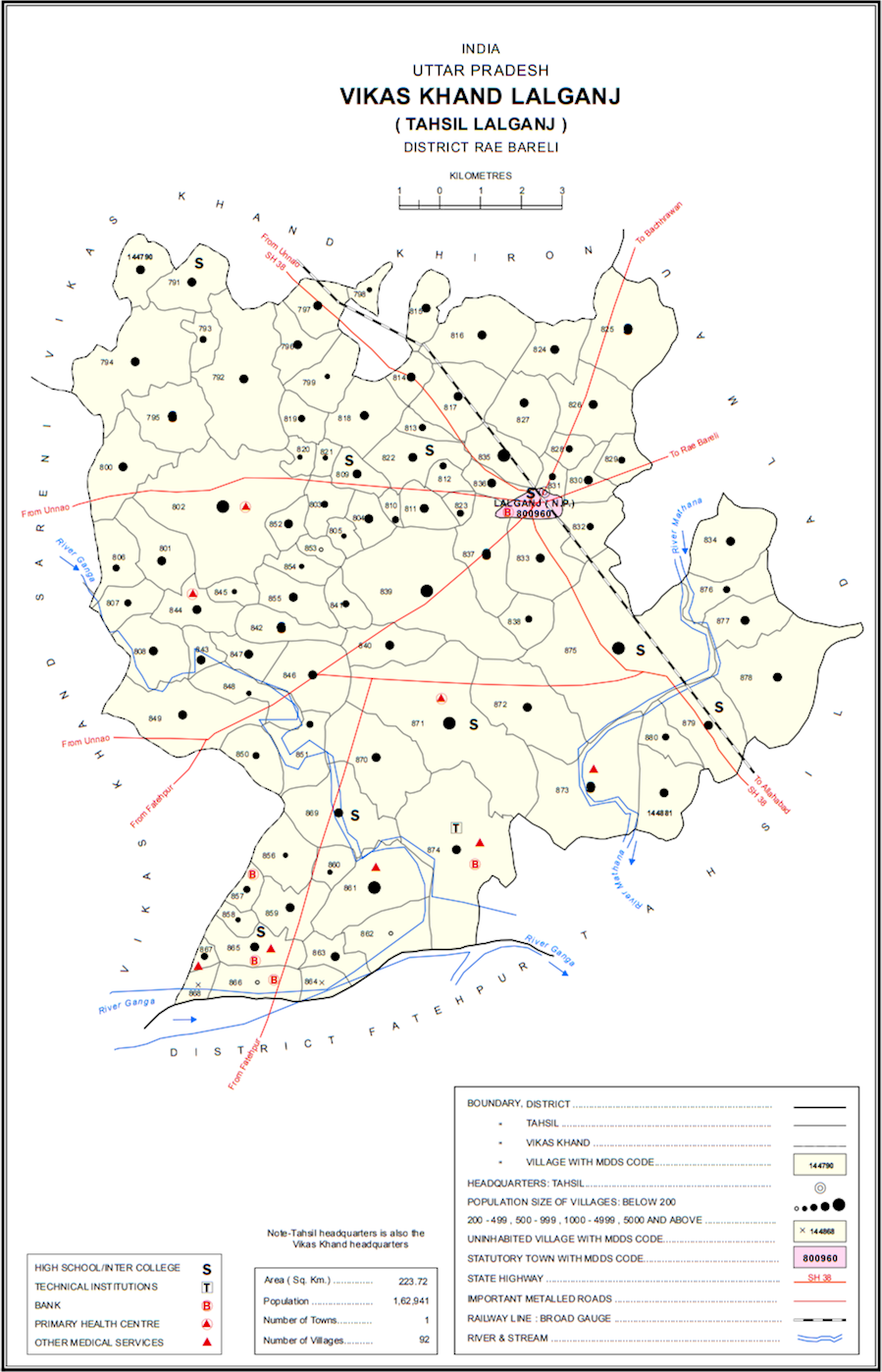
- Map showing Udwamau (#855) in Lalganj CD block

- Location in Uttar Pradesh, India
- Coordinates: 26.146076°N 80.916154°E
- Country India: India
- State: Uttar Pradesh
- District: Raebareli

Area
  - Total: 2.368 km^{2} (0.914 sq mi)

Population (2011)
  - Total: 1,093
  - Density: 461.6/km^{2} (1,195/sq mi)

Languages
  - Official: Hindi
- Time zone: UTC+5:30 (IST)
- Vehicle registration: UP-35

Udwamau is a village in Lalganj block of Rae Bareli district, Uttar Pradesh, India. It is located 5 km from Lalganj, the block and tehsil headquarters. As of 2011, it has a population of 1,093 people, in 205 households. It has one primary school and no healthcare facilities.

The 1961 census recorded Udwamau as comprising 2 hamlets, with a total population of 628 people (312 male and 316 female), in 89 households and 82 physical houses. The area of the village was given as 594 acres.

The 1981 census recorded Udwamau as having a population of 780 people, in 140 households, and having an area of 240.37 hectares. The main staple foods were listed as wheat and rice.
