= Sadipur Bargadha =

Sadipur Bargadha Sādipur Bargadha
- Village
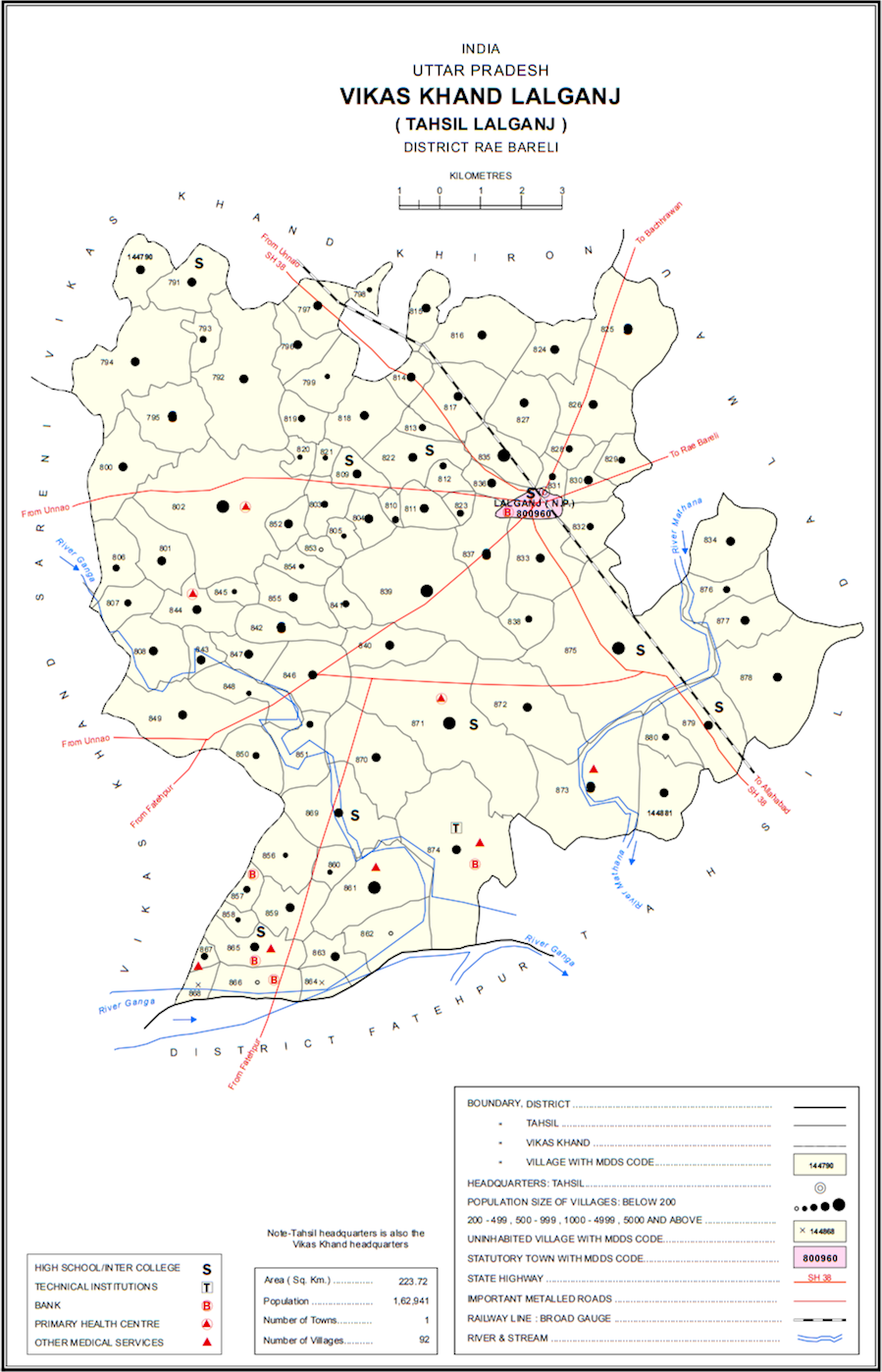
- Map showing Sadipur Bargadha (#858) in Lalganj CD block

- Location in Uttar Pradesh, India
- Coordinates: 26.072722°N 80.903953°E
- Country: India
- State: Uttar Pradesh
- District: Raebareli

Area
  - Total: 0.57 km^{2} (0.22 sq mi)

Population (2011)
  - Total: 352
  - Density: 620/km^{2} (1,600/sq mi)

Languages
  - Official: Hindi
- Time zone: UTC+5:30 (IST)
- Vehicle registration: UP-35

Sadipur Bargadha is a village in Lalganj block of Rae Bareli district, Uttar Pradesh, India. As of 2011, it has a population of 352 people, in 72 households. It has no schools, healthcare facilities, nor hosts a permanent market or a weekly haat. It belongs to the nyaya panchayat of Khajurgaon.

The 1951 census recorded Sadipur Bargadha as comprising 1 hamlet, with a population of 158 people (78 male and 80 female), in 38 households and 37 physical houses. The area of the village was given as 144 acres. 4 residents were literate, all male. The village was listed as belonging to the pargana of Dalmau and the thana of Dalmau.

The 1961 census recorded Sadipur Bargadha (as "Sadipur Bargadaha") as comprising 1 hamlet, with a total population of 175 people (91 male and 84 female), in 39 households and 36 physical houses. The area of the village was given as 144 acres.

The 1981 census recorded Sadipur Bargadha (as "Sadipur Barbadaha") as having a population of 217 people, in 49 households, and having an area of 57.87 hectares. The main staple foods were listed as wheat and rice.

The 1991 census recorded Sadipur Bargadha as having a total population of 260 people (147 male and 113 female), in 45 households and 44 physical houses. The area of the village was listed as 57 hectares. Members of the 0-6 age group numbered 37, or 14% of the total; this group was 51% male (19) and 49% female (18). Members of scheduled castes made up 30% of the village's population, while no members of scheduled tribes were recorded. The literacy rate of the village was 34% (68 men and 21 women). 88 people were classified as main workers (87 men and 1 woman), while 56 people were classified as marginal workers (1 man and 55 women); the remaining 116 residents were non-workers. The breakdown of main workers by employment category was as follows: 43 cultivators (i.e. people who owned or leased their own land); 23 agricultural labourers (i.e. people who worked someone else's land in return for payment); 0 workers in livestock, forestry, fishing, hunting, plantations, orchards, etc.; 0 in mining and quarrying; 0 household industry workers; 7 workers employed in other manufacturing, processing, service, and repair roles; 5 construction workers; 4 employed in trade and commerce; 4 employed in transport, storage, and communications; and 2 in other services.
