= Sarai, Raebareli =

Sarai Sarāi
- Village
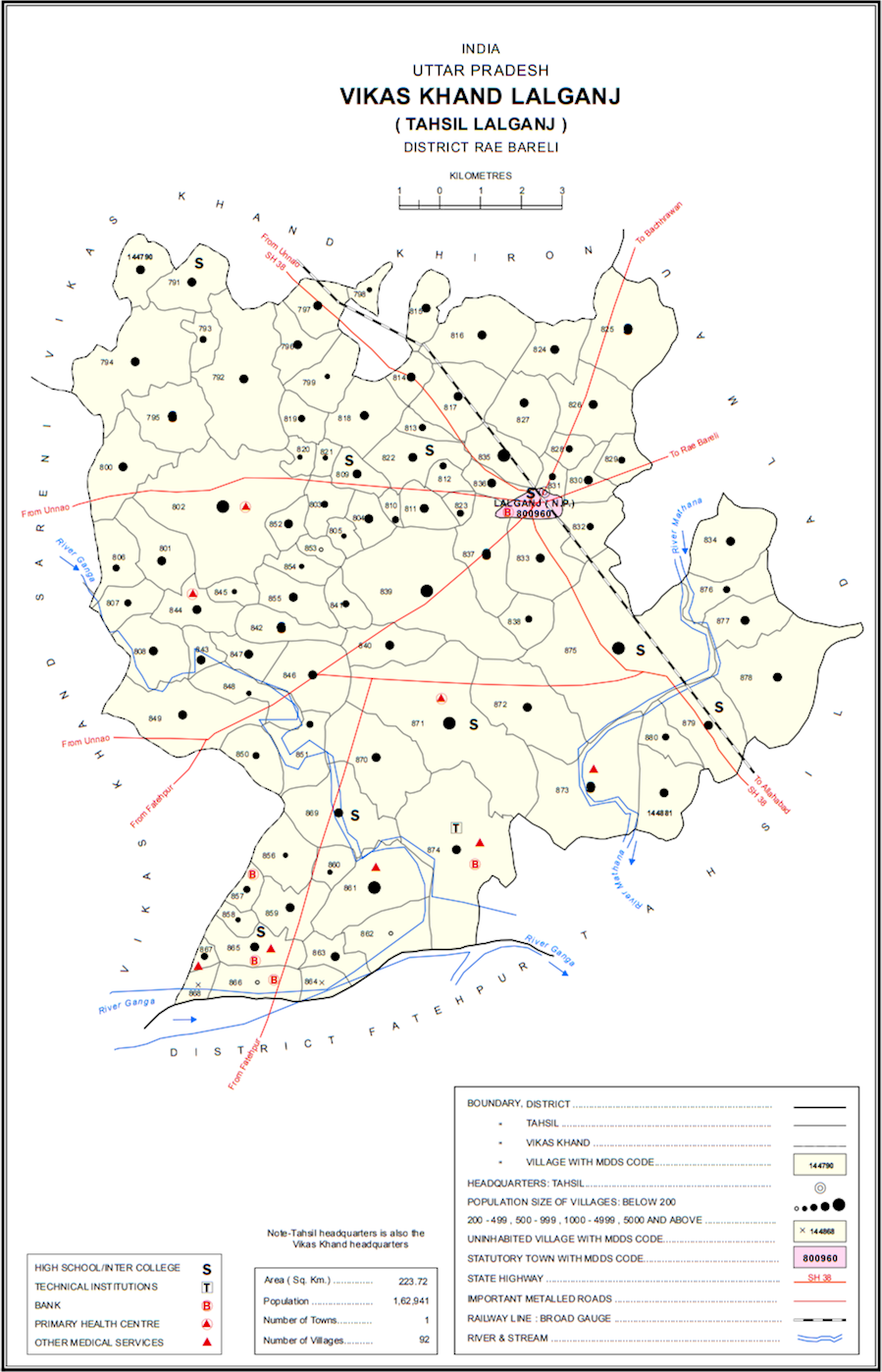
- Map showing Sarai (#793) in Lalganj CD block

- Location in Uttar Pradesh, India
- Coordinates: 26.202845°N 80.898344°E
- Country India: India
- State: Uttar Pradesh
- District: Raebareli

Area
  - Total: 0.776 km^{2} (0.300 sq mi)

Population (2011)
  - Total: 902
  - Density: 1,160/km^{2} (3,010/sq mi)

Languages
  - Official: Hindi
- Time zone: UTC+5:30 (IST)
- Vehicle registration: UP-35

Sarai is a village in Lalganj block of Rae Bareli district, Uttar Pradesh, India. It is located 19 km from Lalganj, the block and tehsil headquarters. As of 2011, it has a population of 902 people, in 173 households. It has one primary school and no healthcare facilities.

The 1961 census recorded Sarai as comprising 2 hamlets, with a total population of 483 people (233 male and 250 female), in 100 households and 90 physical houses. The area of the village was given as 209 acres. It was then part of Khiron block.

The 1981 census recorded Sarai as having a population of 591 people, in 109 households, and having an area of 77.70 hectares. The main staple foods were listed as wheat and rice.
