= Chilaula =

Chilaula Chilāula
- Village
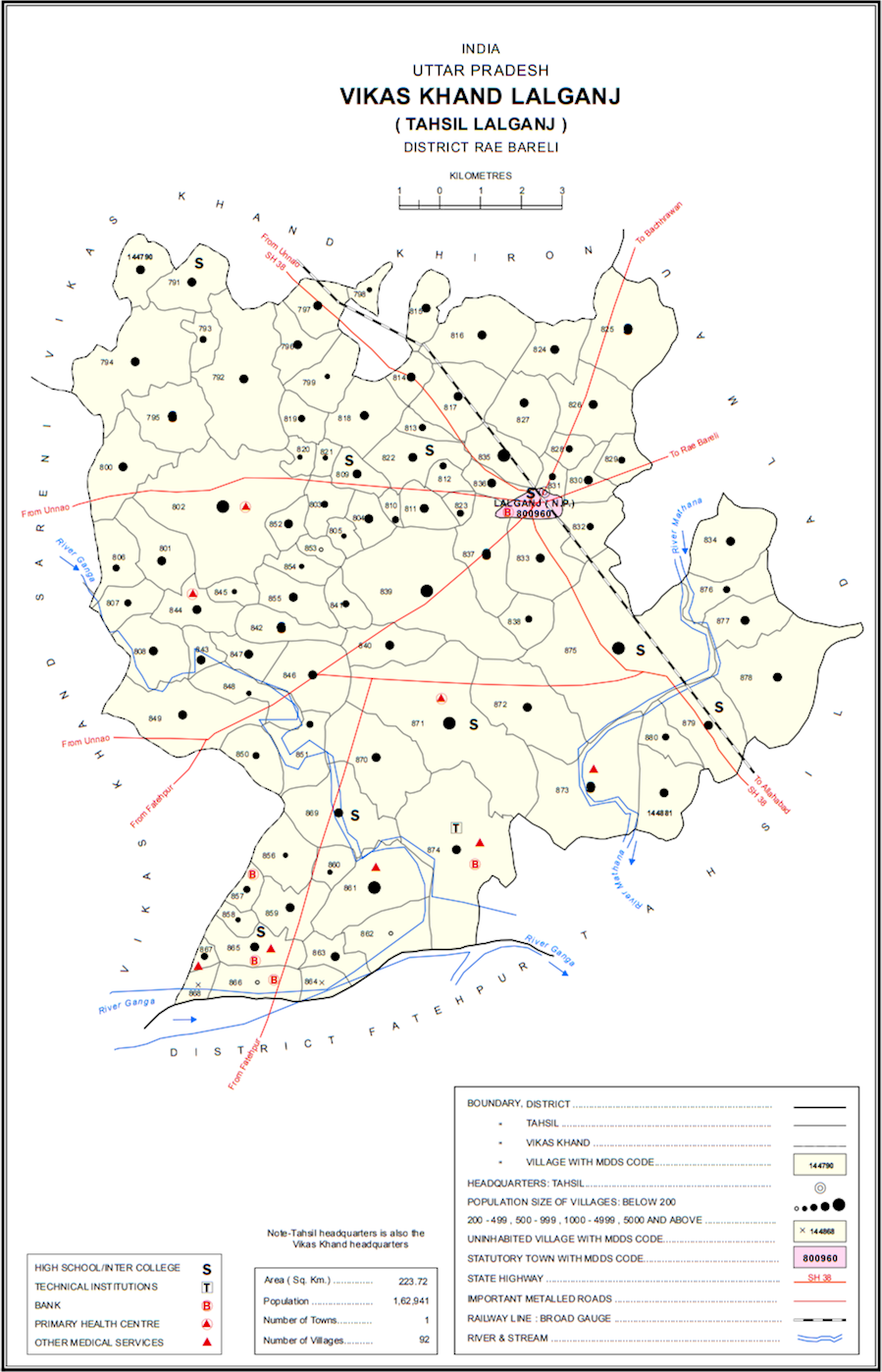
- Map showing Chilaula (#874) in Lalganj CD block

- Location in Uttar Pradesh, India
- Coordinates: 26.093474°N 80.962619°E
- Country India: India
- State: Uttar Pradesh
- District: Raebareli

Area
  - Total: 6.945 km^{2} (2.681 sq mi)

Population (2011)
  - Total: 4,349
  - Density: 626.2/km^{2} (1,622/sq mi)

Languages
  - Official: Hindi
- Time zone: UTC+5:30 (IST)
- Vehicle registration: UP-33

Chilaula is a village in Lalganj block of Rae Bareli district, Uttar Pradesh, India. It is located 7 km from Lalganj, the block and tehsil headquarters. As of 2011, it has a population of 4,349 people, in 749 households. It has two primary schools and one healthcare facility. It has a sub post office and hosts a regular market.

The 1961 census recorded Chilaula as comprising 6 hamlets, with a total population of 2,540 people (1,233 male and 1,307 female), in 462 households and 412 physical houses. The area of the village was given as 1,705 acres and it had a post office at that point.

The 1981 census recorded Chilaula as having a population of 3,289 people, in 589 households, and having an area of 694.45 hectares. The main staple foods were listed as wheat and rice.
