= Tila sequanda =

Scientific classification
- Domain: Eukaryota
- Kingdom: Animalia
- Phylum: Arthropoda
- Class: Insecta
- Order: Lepidoptera
- Family: Gelechiidae
- Genus: Tila
- Species: T. sequanda

Binomial name
- Tila sequanda Povolny, 1974

Species of moth

Tila sequanda is a moth in the family Gelechiidae. It was described by Povolny in 1974. It is found in the Asia Minor.

The length of the forewings is 4–5 mm.
