= Shaistabad Urf Bhurkushpur =

- Village
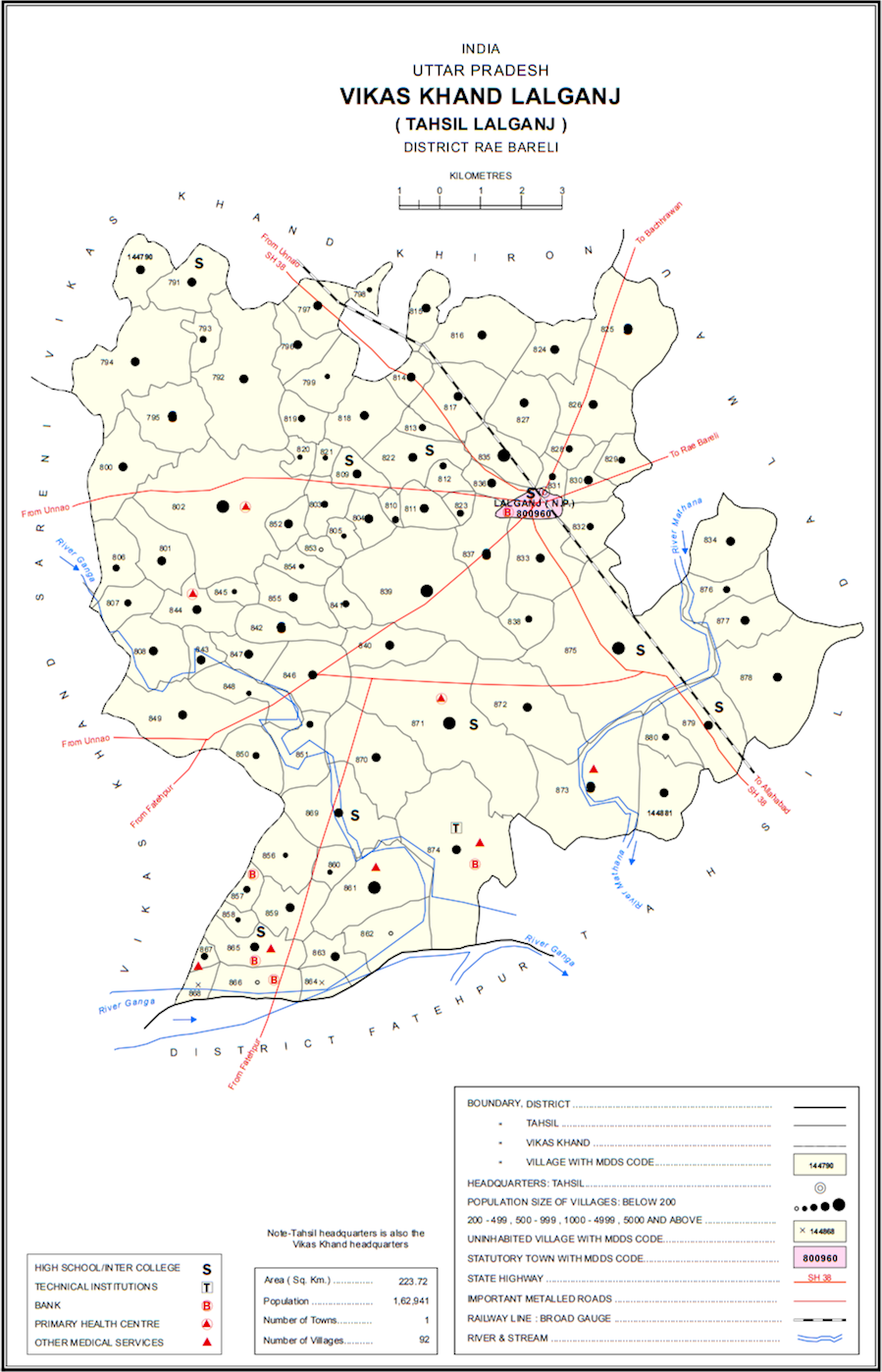
- Map showing Shaistabad Bhurkushpur (#877) in Lalganj CD block

- Location in Uttar Pradesh, India
- Coordinates: 26.141433°N 80.023663°E
- Country India: India
- State: Uttar Pradesh
- District: Raebareli

Area
  - Total: 2.783 km^{2} (1.075 sq mi)

Population (2011)
  - Total: 1,072
  - Density: 385.2/km^{2} (997.7/sq mi)

Languages
  - Official: Hindi
- Time zone: UTC+5:30 (IST)
- Vehicle registration: UP-35

Shaistabad Urf Bhurkushpur is a village in Lalganj block of Rae Bareli district, Uttar Pradesh, India. It is located 8 km from Lalganj, the block and tehsil headquarters. As of 2011, it has a population of 1,072 people, in 199 households. It has one primary school and no healthcare facilities, and it hosts a permanent market but not a weekly haat. It belongs to the nyaya panchayat of Bahai.

The 1951 census recorded Shaistabad Urf Bhurkushpur (as "Shaistabad Bhurkuspur") as comprising 4 hamlets, with a total population of 355 people (185 male and 170 female), in 70 households and 66 physical houses. The area of the village was given as 706 acres. 55 residents were literate, 43 male and 11 female. The village was listed as belonging to the pargana of Dalmau and the thana of Dalmau.

The 1961 census recorded Shaistabad Urf Bhurkushpur (as "Saistabad urf Bhurkushpur") as comprising 3 hamlets, with a total population of 378 people (202 male and 176 female), in 76 households and 72 physical houses. The area of the village was given as 706 acres and it had a railway station, library, and medical practitioner at that point.

The 1981 census recorded Shaistabad Urf Bhurkushpur (as "Saistabad Urf Baurkaspur") as having a population of 610 people, in 107 households, and having an area of 278.42 hectares. The main staple foods were listed as wheat and rice.

The 1991 census recorded Shaistabad Urf Bhurkushpur as having a total population of 685 people (336 male and 349 female), in 124 households and 124 physical houses. The area of the village was listed as 178 hectares. Members of the 0-6 age group numbered 134, or 19.5% of the total; this group was 44% male (59) and 56% female (75). Members of scheduled castes made up 24% of the village's population, while no members of scheduled tribes were recorded. The literacy rate of the village was 29% (154 men and 47 women). 148 people were classified as main workers (all men), while 108 people were classified as marginal workers (1 man and 107 women); the remaining 429 residents were non-workers. The breakdown of main workers by employment category was as follows: 129 cultivators (i.e. people who owned or leased their own land); 5 agricultural labourers (i.e. people who worked someone else's land in return for payment); 0 workers in livestock, forestry, fishing, hunting, plantations, orchards, etc.; 0 in mining and quarrying; 0 household industry workers; 0 workers employed in other manufacturing, processing, service, and repair roles; 0 construction workers; 0 employed in trade and commerce; 0 employed in transport, storage, and communications; and 14 in other services.
