= Chanda, Raebareli =

Chanda Chānda
- Village
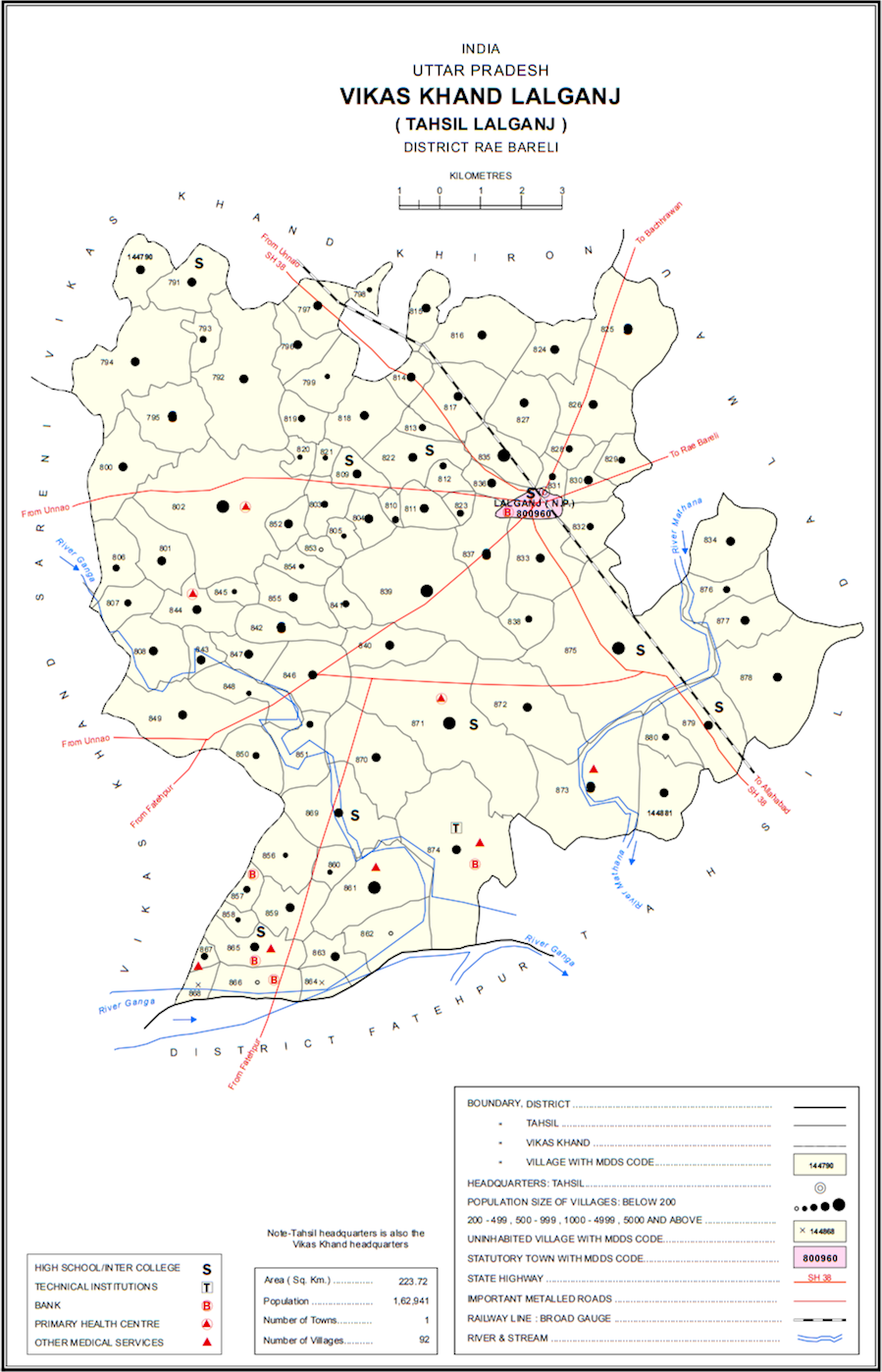
- Map showing Chanda (#824) in Lalganj CD block

- Location in Uttar Pradesh, India
- Coordinates: 26.199226°N 80.983025°E
- Country India: India
- State: Uttar Pradesh
- District: Raebareli

Area
  - Total: 2.259 km^{2} (0.872 sq mi)

Population (2011)
  - Total: 1,246
  - Density: 551.6/km^{2} (1,429/sq mi)

Languages
  - Official: Hindi
- Time zone: UTC+5:30 (IST)
- Vehicle registration: UP-35

Chanda is a village in Lalganj block of Rae Bareli district, Uttar Pradesh, India. It is located 4 km from Lalganj, the block and tehsil headquarters. As of 2011, it has a population of 1,246 people, in 201 households. It has one primary school and no healthcare facilities.

The 1961 census recorded Chanda as comprising 4 hamlets, with a total population of 506 people (254 male and 252 female), in 93 households and 90 physical houses. The area of the village was given as 564 acres.

The 1981 census recorded Chanda as having a population of 756 people, in 130 households. The main staple foods were listed as wheat and rice.
