= Saraila, Raebareli =

Saraila
- Village
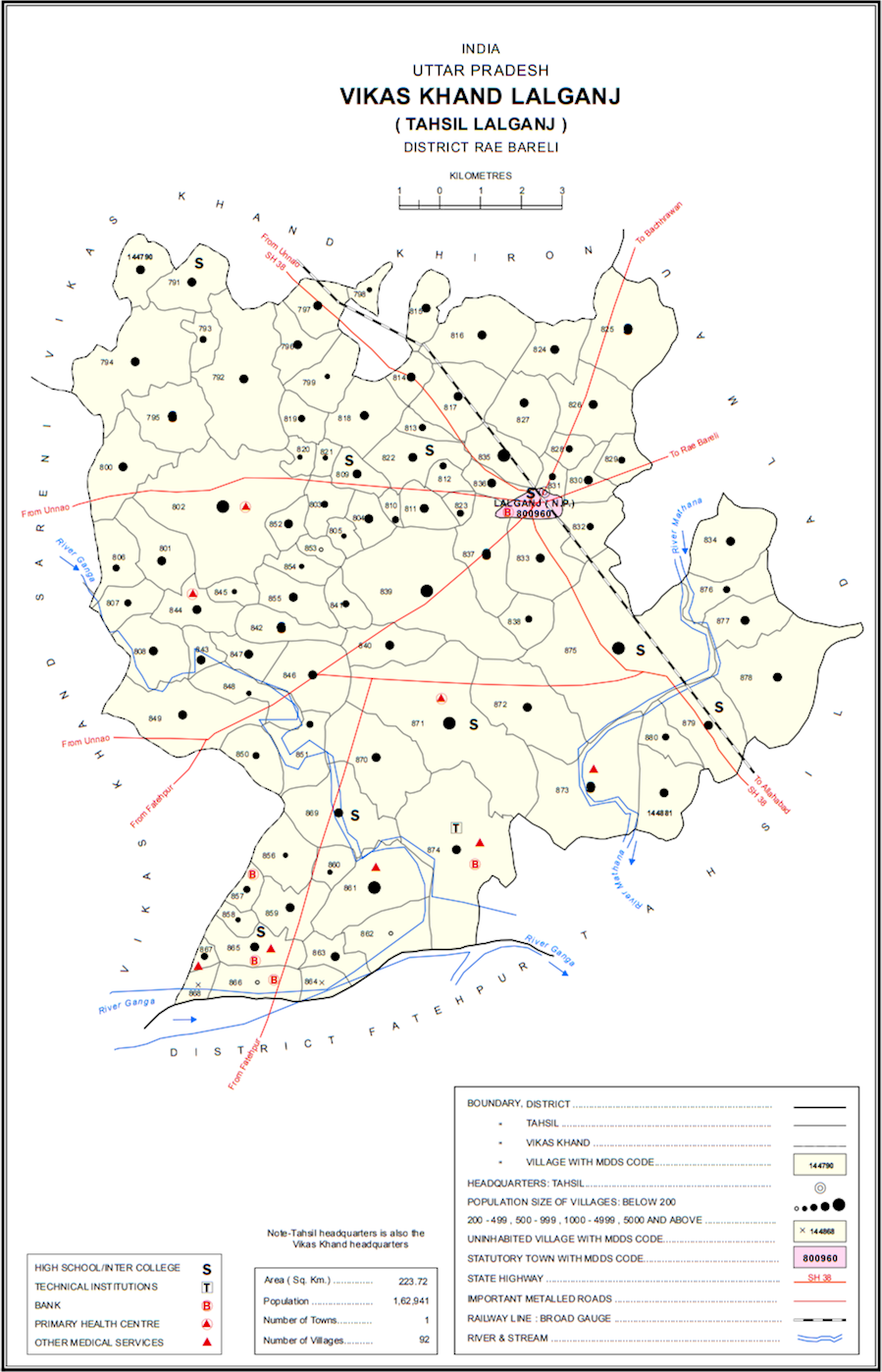
- Map showing Saraila (#860) in Lalganj CD block

- Location in Uttar Pradesh, India
- Coordinates: 26.088814°N 80.927009°E
- Country India: India
- State: Uttar Pradesh
- District: Raebareli

Area
  - Total: 0.756 km^{2} (0.292 sq mi)

Population (2011)
  - Total: 385
  - Density: 509/km^{2} (1,320/sq mi)

Languages
  - Official: Hindi
- Time zone: UTC+5:30 (IST)
- Vehicle registration: UP-35

Saraila is a village in Lalganj block of Rae Bareli district, Uttar Pradesh, India. It is located 11 km from Lalganj, the block and tehsil headquarters. As of 2011, it has a population of 385 people, in 73 households. It has one primary school and no healthcare facilities.

The 1961 census recorded Saraila as comprising 1 hamlet, with a total population of 130 people (71 male and 59 female), in 24 households and 23 physical houses. The area of the village was given as 185 acres.

The 1981 census recorded Saraila as having a population of 218 people, in 41 households, and having an area of 74.86 hectares. The main staple foods were listed as wheat and rice.
