= Fakhruddinpur =

- Village
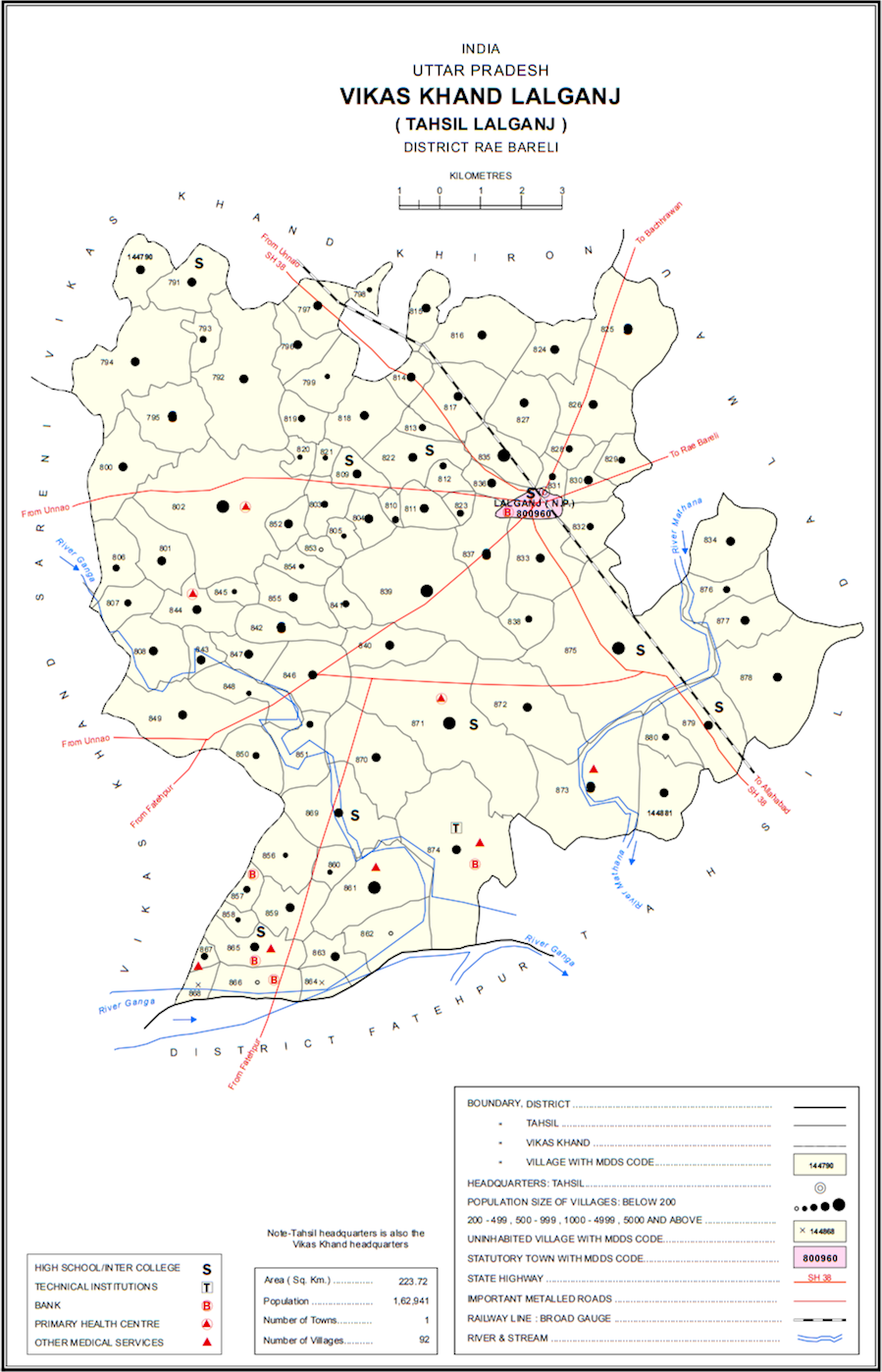
- Map showing Fakhruddinpur (#880) in Lalganj CD block

- Location in Uttar Pradesh, India
- Coordinates: 26.112877°N 80.008569°E
- Country India: India
- State: Uttar Pradesh
- District: Raebareli

Area
  - Total: 2.989 km^{2} (1.154 sq mi)

Population (2011)
  - Total: 823
  - Density: 275/km^{2} (713/sq mi)

Languages
  - Official: Hindi
- Time zone: UTC+5:30 (IST)
- Vehicle registration: UP-35

Fakhruddinpur is a village in Lalganj block of Rae Bareli district, Uttar Pradesh, India. As of 2011, it has a population of 823 people, in 136 households. It has 2 primary schools and no healthcare facilities, and it hosts a permanent market but not a weekly haat. It belongs to the nyaya panchayat of Bahai.

The 1951 census recorded Fakhruddinpur (as "Fakharuddinpur") as comprising 3 hamlets, with a total population of 238 people (117 male and 121 female), in 51 households and 35 physical houses. The area of the village was given as 210 acres. 32 residents were literate, all male. The village was listed as belonging to the pargana of Dalmau and the thana of Dalmau.

The 1961 census recorded Fakhruddinpur (as "Fakharuddinpur") as comprising 3 hamlets, a total population of 293 people (149 male and 144 female), in 52 households and 52 physical houses. The area of the village was given as 210 acres.

The 1981 census recorded Fakhruddinpur (as "Fakharudinpur") as having a population of 448 people, in 94 households, and having an area of 87.42 hectares. The main staple foods were listed as wheat and rice.

The 1991 census recorded Fakhruddinpur (as "Fakruddinpur") as having a total population of 545 people (265 male and 280 female), in 87 households and 85 physical houses. The area of the village was listed as 76 hectares. Members of the 0-6 age group numbered 131, or 24% of the total; this group was 55% male (72) and 45% female (59). Members of scheduled castes made up 34% of the village's population, while no members of scheduled tribes were recorded. The literacy rate of the village was 31% (117 men and 54 women). 114 people were classified as main workers (112 men and 2 women), while 120 people were classified as marginal workers (all women); the remaining 311 residents were non-workers. The breakdown of main workers by employment category was as follows: 70 cultivators (i.e. people who owned or leased their own land); 27 agricultural labourers (i.e. people who worked someone else's land in return for payment); 0 workers in livestock, forestry, fishing, hunting, plantations, orchards, etc.; 0 in mining and quarrying; 0 household industry workers; 4 workers employed in other manufacturing, processing, service, and repair roles; 2 construction workers; 3 employed in trade and commerce; 1 employed in transport, storage, and communications; and 7 in other services.
