= Ambara Pachhim =

Ambara Pachhim Ambāra Pachhim
- Village
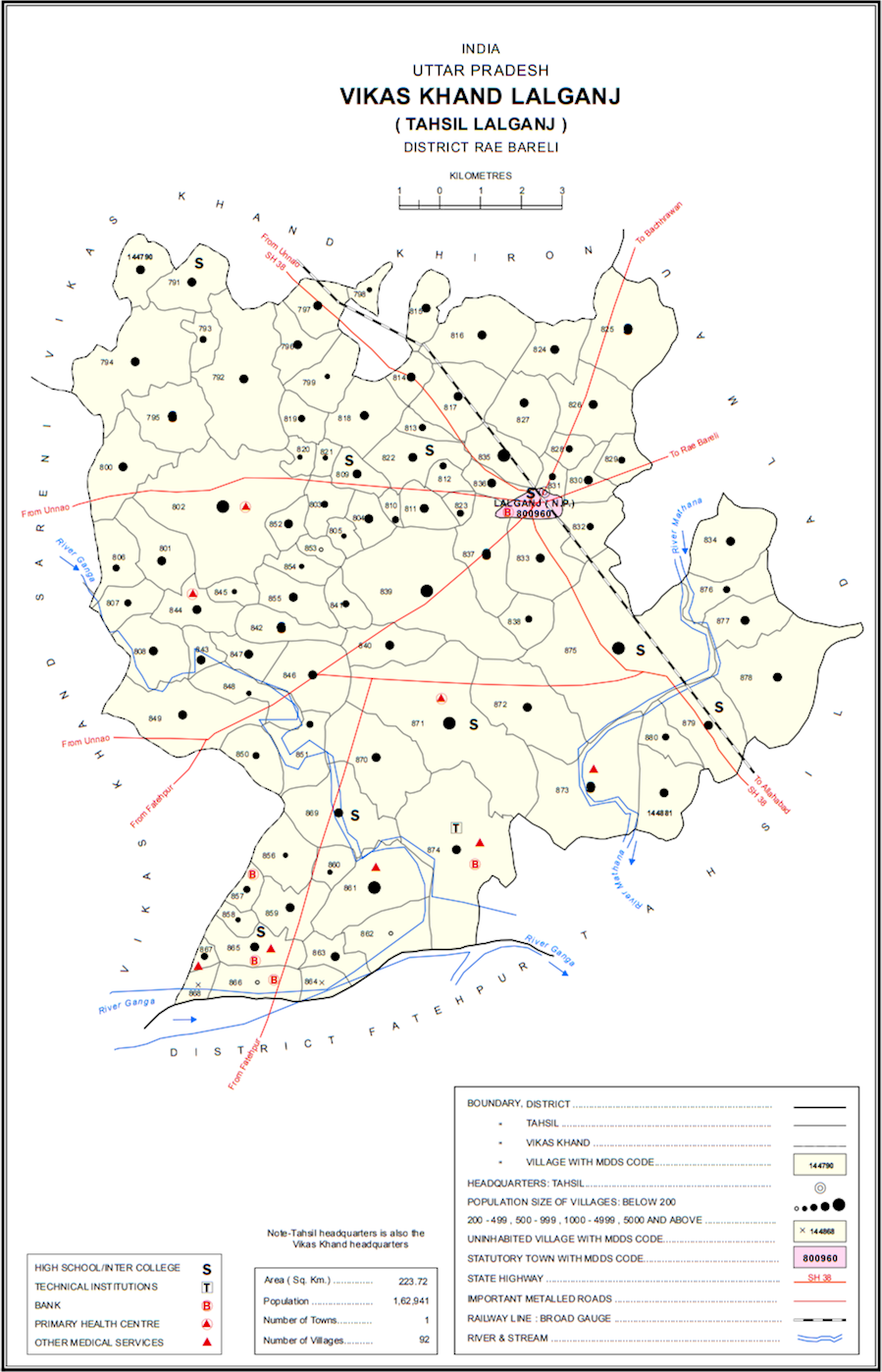
- Map showing Ambara Pachhim (#871) in Lalganj CD block

- Location in Uttar Pradesh, India
- Coordinates: 26.128368°N 80.947028°E
- Country India: India
- State: Uttar Pradesh
- District: Raebareli

Area
  - Total: 8.742 km^{2} (3.375 sq mi)

Population (2011)
  - Total: 5,223
  - Density: 597.5/km^{2} (1,547/sq mi)

Languages
  - Official: Hindi
- Time zone: UTC+5:30 (IST)
- Vehicle registration: UP-35

Ambara Pachhim is a village in Lalganj block of Rae Bareli district, Uttar Pradesh, India. It is located 5 km from Lalganj, the block and tehsil headquarters. As of 2011, it has a population of 5,223 people, in 941 households. It has three primary schools and one medical clinic. Ambara Pachhim hosts a market twice per week, on Mondays and Thursdays; vegetables and cloth are the main items traded.

The 1961 census recorded Ambara Pachhim as comprising 9 hamlets, with a total population of 2,252 people (1,092 male and 1,160 female), in 426 households and 376 physical houses. The area of the village was given as 2,204 acres and it had a post office at that point. Average attendance of the twice-weekly market was about 150 people.

The 1981 census recorded Ambara Pachhim (as "Ambara Paschim") as having a population of 3,151 people, in 558 households, and having an area of 891.93 hectares. The main staple foods were listed as wheat and rice.
