= Tila (moth) =

Scientific classification
- Kingdom: Animalia
- Phylum: Arthropoda
- Clade: Pancrustacea
- Class: Insecta
- Order: Lepidoptera
- Family: Gelechiidae
- Tribe: Gnorimoschemini
- Genus: Tila; Povolný, 1965

Genus of moths

Tila is a genus of moth in the family Gelechiidae.

== Species ==
- Tila capsophilella (Chrétien, 1900)
- Tila sequanda (Povolny, 1974)
