= Mubarakpur, Lalganj =

Mubarakpur Mubārakpur
- Village
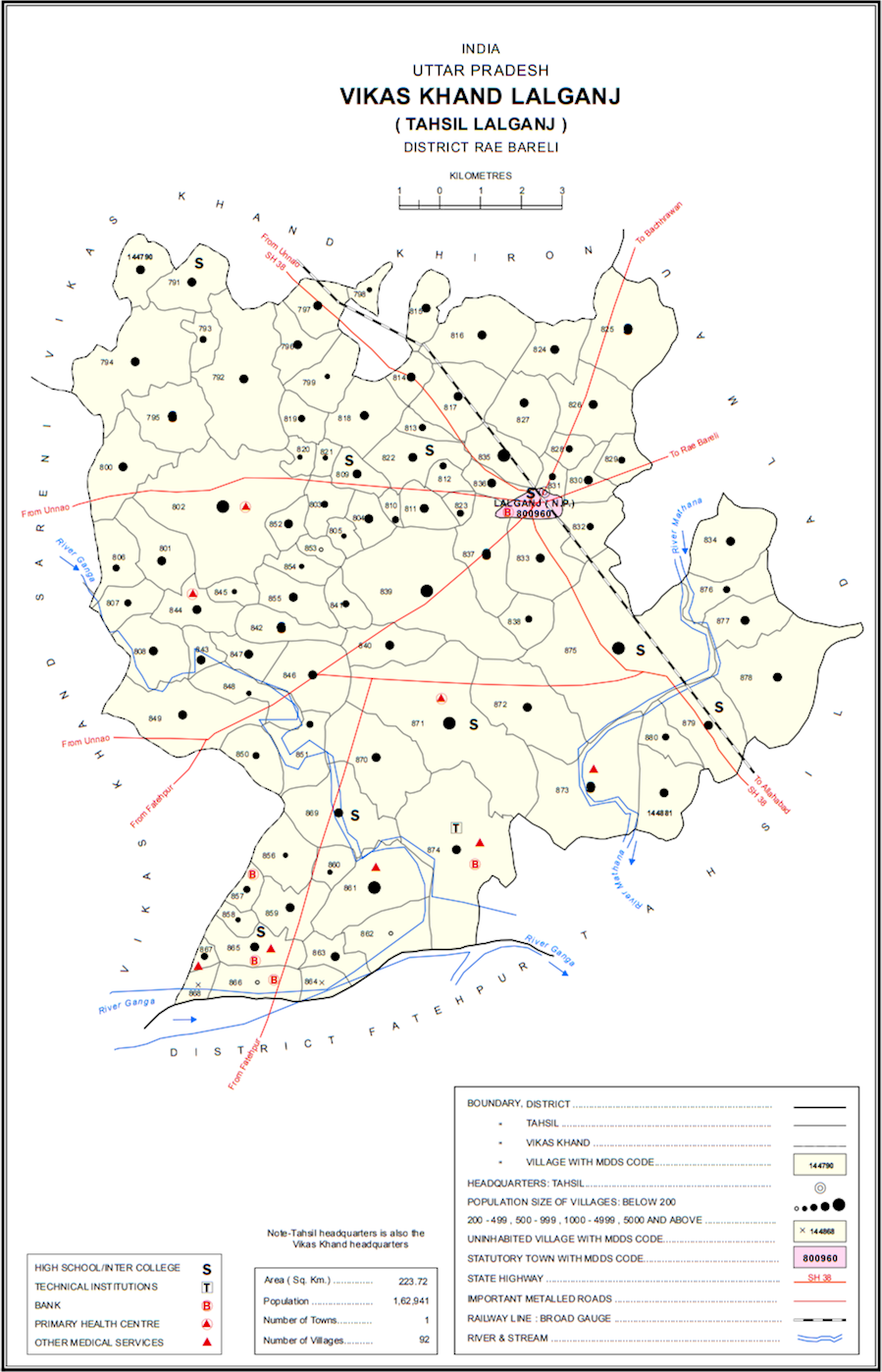
- Map showing Mubarakpur (#814) in Lalganj CD block

- Location in Uttar Pradesh, India
- Coordinates: 26°11′37″N 80°56′33″E
- Country India: India
- State: Uttar Pradesh
- District: Raebareli

Area
  - Total: 1.24 km^{2} (0.48 sq mi)

Population (2011)
  - Total: 1,217
  - Density: 981/km^{2} (2,540/sq mi)

Languages
  - Official: Hindi
- Time zone: UTC+5:30 (IST)
- Vehicle registration: UP-35

Mubarakpur is a village in Lalganj block of Rae Bareli district, Uttar Pradesh, India. It is located 3 km from Lalganj, the block and tehsil headquarters. As of 2011, it has a population of 1,217 people, in 246 households. It has one primary school and no healthcare facilities.

The 1961 census recorded Mubarakpur as comprising 2 hamlets, with a total population of 420 people (187 male and 233 female), in 82 households and 76 physical houses. The area of the village was given as 327 acres.

The 1981 census recorded Mubarakpur as having a population of 643 people, in 110 households, and having an area of 125.46 hectares. The main staple foods were listed as wheat and rice.
