= Tila, Raebareli =

Tila
- Village
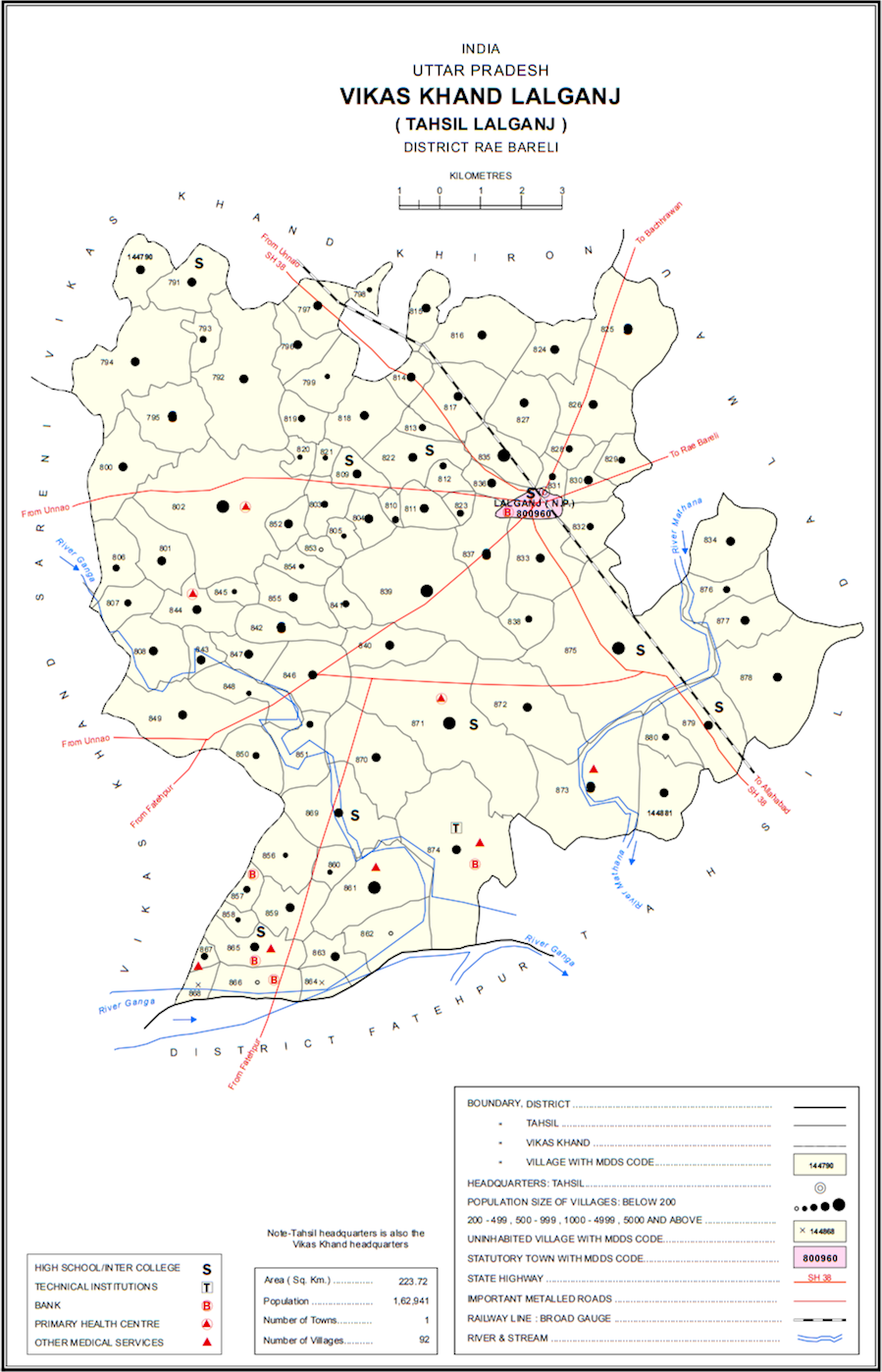
- Map showing Tila (#857) in Lalganj CD block

- Location in Uttar Pradesh, India
- Coordinates: 26.081298°N 80.904461°E
- Country India: India
- State: Uttar Pradesh
- District: Raebareli

Area
  - Total: 0.914 km^{2} (0.353 sq mi)

Population (2011)
  - Total: 839
  - Density: 918/km^{2} (2,380/sq mi)

Languages
  - Official: Hindi
- Time zone: UTC+5:30 (IST)
- Vehicle registration: UP-35

Tila is a village in Lalganj block of Rae Bareli district, Uttar Pradesh, India. As of 2011, it has a population of 839 people, in 163 households. It has one primary school and no healthcare facilities.

The 1961 census recorded Tila as comprising 2 hamlets, with a total population of 311 people (164 male and 147 female), in 73 households and 67 physical houses. The area of the village was given as 223 acres.

The 1981 census recorded Tila as having a population of 515 people, in 100 households, and having an area of 92.26 hectares. The main staple foods were listed as wheat and rice.
