= Barbasa Gaharwar =

Village in Uttar Pradesh, India

Coordinates: 24.89067964112893°N 82.22114446351065°E

Barbasa Gaharwar is a village in Halia block, Lalganj tehsil, Mirzapur, Uttar Pradesh, India. Its village code is 211957, its geographical area is 284.4 hectares, and it has a population of 1,728 who live in about 348 houses. Its police station is in Halia. Khutahan is the gram panchayat.
