= Lalganj, Uttar Pradesh =

Lalganj
- Town
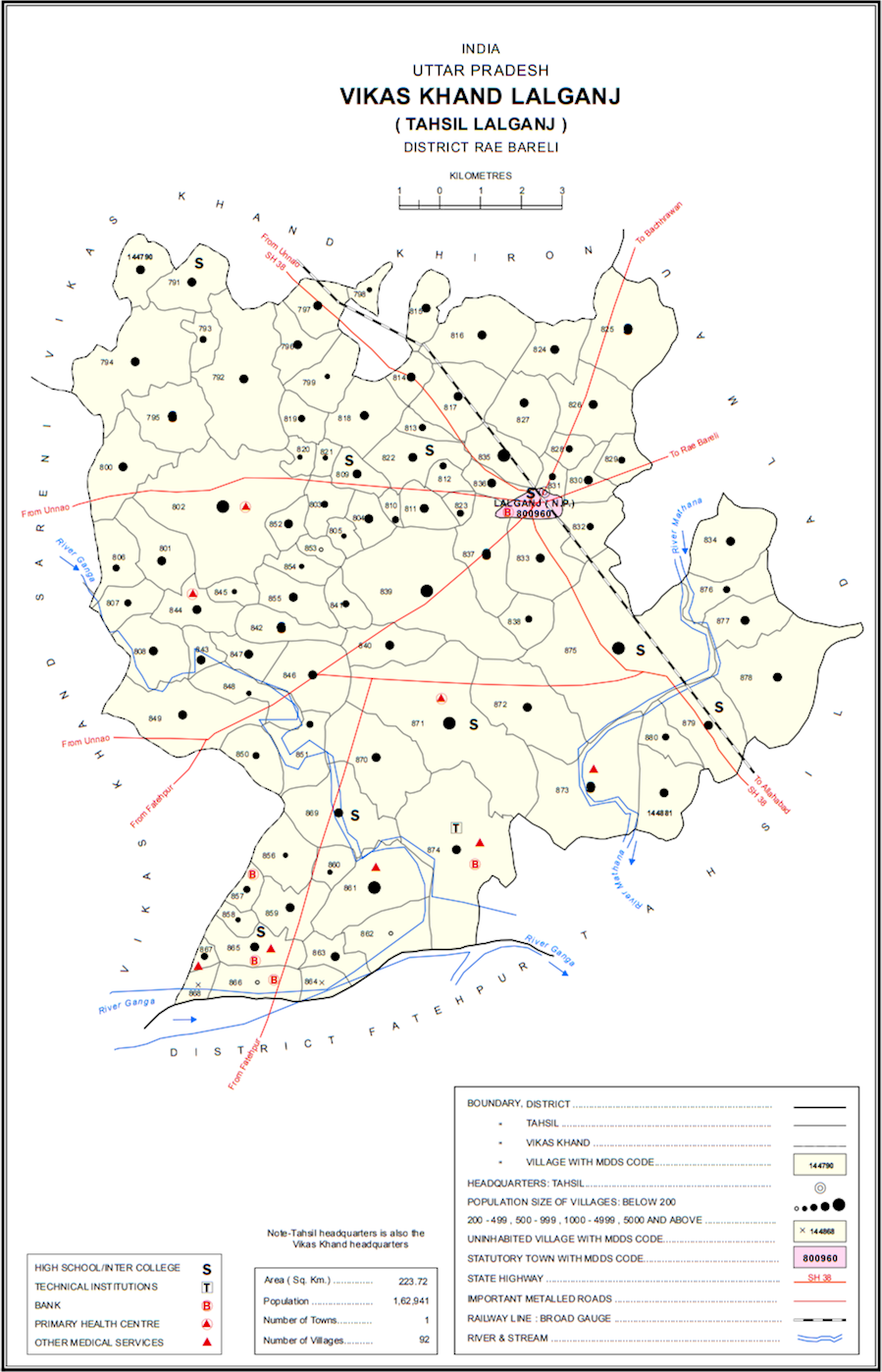
- Map of Lalganj CD block

- Location in Uttar Pradesh, India Lalganj (India)
- Coordinates: 26.12766°N 80.7855°E
- Country: India
- State: Uttar Pradesh
- District: Raebareli

Government
  - MP: Rahul Gandhi

Area
  - Total: 4.12 km^{2} (1.59 sq mi)
  - Rank: Raebareli Division
- Elevation: 142 m (466 ft)

Population (2011)
  - Total: 23,124
  - Density: 5,610/km^{2} (14,500/sq mi)

Languages
  - Official: Hindi
  - Regional: Awadhi, Hindi language
- Time zone: UTC+5:30 (IST)
- PIN: 229206
- Vehicle registration: UP-33
- Sex ratio: 75.5 ♂/♀
- Website: up.gov.in

Lalganj is a town and nagar panchayat (municipality) in Raebareli district of Uttar Pradesh, India.

As of 2011 Lalganj had a population of 23,124, in 3,996 households.

== History ==
Lalganj was founded by, and named after, Lal Singh of Simarpaha.

At the turn of the 20th century, Lalganj was described as "a flourishing little market town" that served as the second-most-important bazar in the district, behind Raebareli itself. It hosted markets twice a week and traded hides, cloth, and oilseeds with Kanpur. Because of the town's growing importance, the road between Lalganj and Raebareli was metalled in 1902 through 1904. At around that time, Lalganj had a police station, a post office, a cattle pound, and a large primary school, as well as a road inspection bungalow that had recently been built. The town had a large Bania population as well as a Bais colony. Lalganj was then technically part of the village of Datauli Lalganj; Datauli had been founded by Sheo Singh, an ancestor of Lal Singh.

== Demographics ==
Historical population
Year	Pop.	±%
1941	2,280	—
1951	3,345	+46.7%
1961	Not given	—
1971	Not given	—
1981	10,605	—
1991	15,405	+45.3%
2001	21,142	+37.2%
2011	23,124	+9.4%
Source: 2011 Census of India

According to the 2011 census, Lalganj has a population of 23,124 people, in 3,996 households. The town's sex ratio is 914 females to every 1000 males, which is the lowest among towns in Raebareli district; 12,082 of Lalganj's residents are male (52.2%) and 11,042 are female (47.8%). The 0-6 age group makes up about 10.3% of the town's population; the sex ratio for this group is 857, which is also the lowest in the district. Members of Scheduled Castes make up 14.78% of the town's population, while members of Scheduled Tribes make up 0.12%. Lalganj's literacy rate was 86.07% (counting only people age 7 and up), which was the highest among towns in the district; literacy was higher among men and boys (91.2%) than among women and girls (80.5%). The scheduled castes literacy rate is 75.52% (84.15% among men and boys, and 65.74% among women and girls).

In terms of employment, 23.09% of Lalganj residents were classified as main workers (i.e. people employed for at least 6 months per year) in 2011. Marginal workers (i.e. people employed for less than 6 months per year) made up 5.81%, and the remaining 71.10% were non-workers. Employment status varied significantly according to gender, with 47.08% of men being either main or marginal workers, compared to 9.01% of women.

55.63% of Lalganj residents live in slum conditions as of 2011. There are 10 slum areas in Lalganj: Adarsh Nagar, Chaman Ganj, Chikvahi, Domahi, Mahesh Kheda, Pure Baba, Ali Nagar, Krishna Nagar, Sudan Kheda, and Pure Debi. These range in size from about 101 to 455 households and have between 8 and 13 tap water access points. The number of flush toilets installed in people's homes ranges from 91 to 338. All 10 areas are serviced by a mix of open and closed sewers.

== Villages ==
Lalganj CD block has the following 92 villages:

Village name	Total land area (hectares)	Population (in 2011)
Deopur	375.6	1,171
Sakatpur	210.1	1,906
Gahiri	613.2	4,259
Sarai	77.6	902
Jogapur Barigaon	648.6	4,081
Baraha	245.6	1,656
Matehana	97.3	1,138
Saimbasi	168.8	1,225
Fatte Sarai	65.2	295
Khanpur Khapura	102.9	394
Bandai	340.3	3,204
Rewari Pasiya Khera	209.4	1,202
Behta Kalan	781.8	6,148
Shahpur	141.8	689
Maha Khera	78.2	1,515
Pratappur	53.5	417
Sarai Kurmi	178.3	843
Champatpur	133.8	685
Bemoura Mahesh Khera	545.4	1,946
Haripur	127.3	1,527
Pure Ori	52.8	836
Dhannipur	62	1,053
Dayalpur	45	728
Basu Gari	33.4	605
Mubarakpur	124	1,217
Ranipur	172.9	1,418
Uga Bhad	369.8	1,633
Dhana Bhad	255.3	2,007
Maduri	293.2	1,928
Narsinghpur	93.6	655
Dostpur	48.9	295
Pure Bhawani	70.8	260
Kumhraura	307.1	2,895
Malpura	58.9	867
Chanda	225.9	1,246
Yusufpur	477.6	2,905
Banna Mau	246	1,862
Ran Gaon	243	1,764
Mirzapur Urf Toadhakpur	63.2	833
Shekhwapur	78	597
Govindpur Valauli	142.3	2,010
Trivedipur	61.8	800
Mahmad Mau	142.7	838
Datauli Lal Ganj	267.7	3,690
Jamuwanwa	284.3	1,060
Alampur	209.1	5,162
Suddan Khera	30.1	1,808
Korihara	237.2	3,149
Chachiha	126.8	933
Semer Paha	786.9	8,391
Shobhwapur	198.7	2,231
Aanapur	126.2	896
Bishun Khera	118.1	1,166
Jhavar Hardi Patti	73.8	1,476
Jagatpur Bhichkaura	291.9	2,401
Sandi	50.1	228
Paliyavir Singhpur	283.2	1,776
Maide Mau	157.2	1,027
Narendrapur	84.9	326
Sarai Bairiha Khera	419.5	2,485
Kankapur	149.8	516
Gougu Mau	112	976
Bahrampur	118.5	1,210
Gunagar Khera	80.4	169
Golha Mau	74.1	360
Udwa Mau	236.8	1,093
Chorahiya	157.2	301
Tila	91.4	839
Sadipur Bargadha	57	352
Mithapur Barhaiya	180.7	1,793
Saraila	75.6	385
Khajur Gaon Mu.	472.2	5,916
Khajur Gaon Aht.	830	31
Janewa Katra Mu.	172.1	1,040
Janewa Katra Aht.	20.4	0
Gegaso Mu.	375	2,878
Gegaso Aht.	51.8	1
Bajpaipur Mu.	105	917
Bajpaipur Aht.	17.4	0
Lalu Mau	392.2	1,852
Gora Rupaipir Alipur	445.7	3,097
Ambara Pashchim	874.2	5,223
Utra Gauri	488	3,630
Sondasi	706.6	4,205
Chilaula	694.5	4,349
Bahai	1,088.4	9,368
Kanh Mau	105.2	567
Shaistabad Urf Bhurkushpur	278.3	1,072
Mustafabad Belahni	625.6	2,977
Chanda Tikar	300.9	2,156
Fakruddinpur	298.9	823
Rajauli	87.6	1,915

== See also ==
- Barbasa Gaharwar
