= Jamkoriapur =

Jamkoriapur Jamkoriāpur
- Village
- Map showing Jamkoriapur (#579) in Khiron CD block

- Location in Uttar Pradesh, India
- Coordinates: 26.2530°N 80.9680°E
- Country: India
- State: Uttar Pradesh
- District: Raebareli

Area
  - Total: 1.69 km^{2} (0.65 sq mi)

Population (2011)
  - Total: 881
  - Density: 521/km^{2} (1,350/sq mi)

Languages
  - Official: Hindi
- Time zone: UTC+5:30 (IST)
- Vehicle registration: UP-35

Jamkoriapur is a village in Khiron block of Rae Bareli district, Uttar Pradesh, India. It is located 21 km (13 mi) from Lalganj, the tehsil headquarters. As of 2011, it has a population of 881 people, in 191 households. It has one primary school and no healthcare facilities and it hosts a weekly haat but not a permanent market. It belongs to the nyaya panchayat of Tikwamau.

The 1951 census recorded Jamkoriapur as comprising one hamlet, with a total population of 221 people (112 male and 109 female), in 46 households and 43 physical houses. The area of the village was given as 347 acres (140 ha)s. Eight residents were literate, all male. The village was listed as belonging to the pargana of Khiron and the thana of Gurbakshganj.

The 1961 census recorded Jamkoriapur as comprising one hamlet, with a total population of 260 people (126 male and 134 female), in 53 households and 52 physical houses. The area of the village was given as 347 acres (140 ha)s.

The 1981 census recorded Jamkoriapur as having a population of 424 people, in 81 households, and having an area of 148.93 hectares (368.0 acres). The main staple foods were given as wheat and rice.

The 1991 census recorded Jamkoriapur (as "Jam Koriyapur") as having a total population of 458 people (214 male and 244 female), in 95 households and 95 physical houses. The area of the village was listed as 149 hectares (370 acres). Members of the 0-6 age group numbered 104, or 23% of the total; this group was 55% male (57) and 45% female (47). Members of scheduled castes made up 26% of the village's population, while no members of scheduled tribes were recorded. The literacy rate of the village was 17% (70 men and 9 women). 89 people were classified as main workers (77 men and 12 women), while no people were classified as marginal workers; the remaining 369 residents were non-workers. The breakdown of main workers by employment category was as follows: 57 cultivators (i.e. people who owned or leased their own land); 26 agricultural labourers (i.e. people who worked someone else's land in return for payment); no workers in livestock, forestry, fishing, hunting, plantations, orchards, etc.; no in mining and quarrying; no household industry workers; no workers employed in other manufacturing, processing, service, and repair roles; no construction workers; no employed in trade and commerce; two employed in transport, storage, and communications; and four in other services.
