= Dhannipur, Raebareli =

Dhannipur
- Village
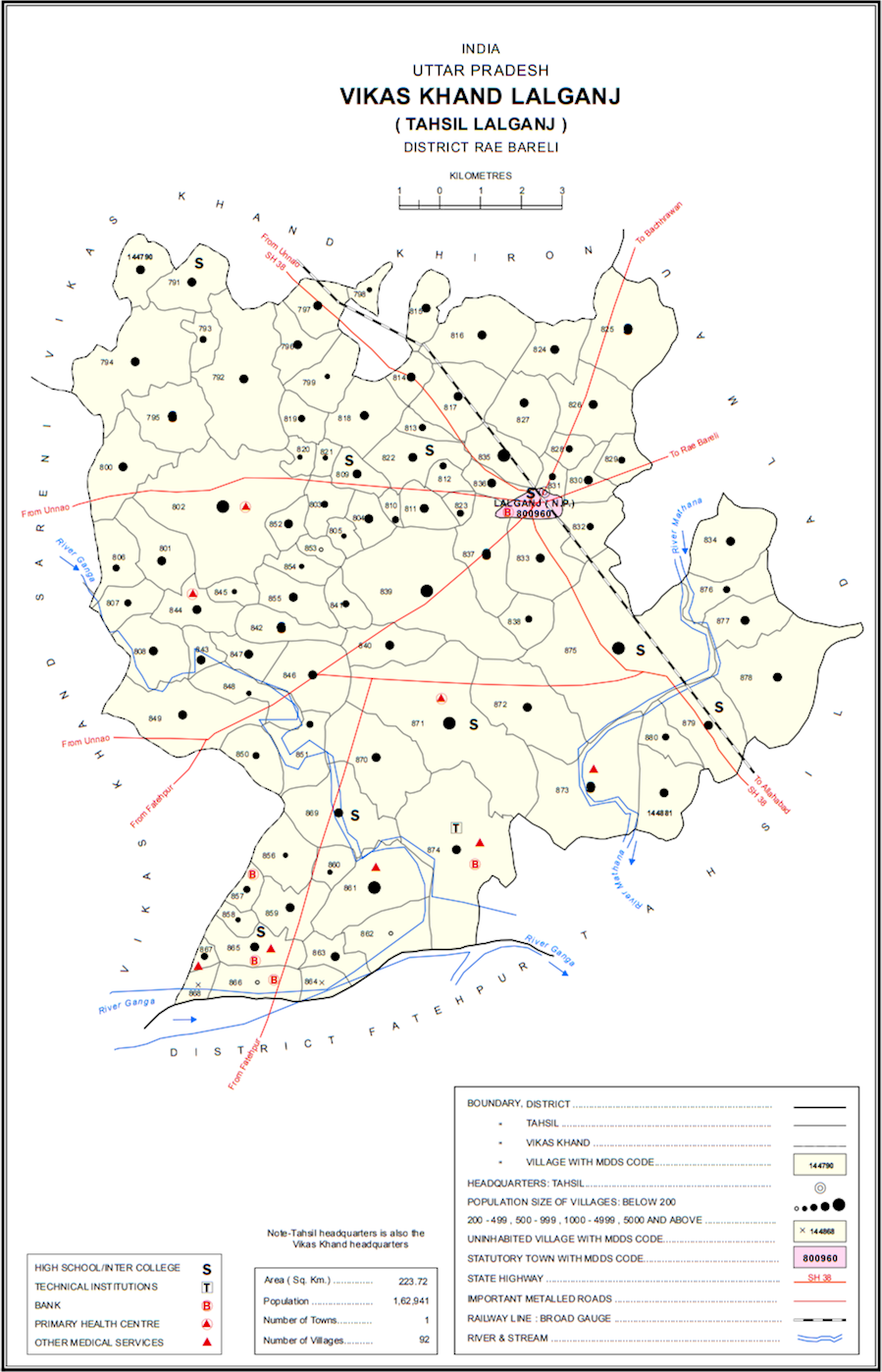
- Map showing Dhannipur (#811) in Lalganj CD block

- Location in Uttar Pradesh, India
- Coordinates: 26.163747°N 80.947796°E
- Country: India
- State: Uttar Pradesh
- District: Raebareli

Area
  - Total: 0.62 km^{2} (0.24 sq mi)

Population (2011)
  - Total: 1,053
  - Density: 1,700/km^{2} (4,400/sq mi)

Languages
  - Official: Hindi
- Time zone: UTC+5:30 (IST)
- Vehicle registration: UP-33

Dhannipur is a village in Lalganj block of Rae Bareli district, Uttar Pradesh, India. It is located 2 km from Lalganj, the block and tehsil headquarters. As of 2011, it has a population of 1,053 people, in 160 households. It has no healthcare facilities, permanent market or a weekly haat. It belongs to the nyaya panchayat of Mubarakpur.

The 1951 census recorded Dhannipur as comprising 3 hamlets, with a population of 375 people (191 male and 184 female), in 81 households and 53 physical houses. The area of the village was given as 156 acres. 33 residents were literate, all male. The village was listed as belonging to the pargana of Khiron and the thana of Sareni.

The 1961 census recorded Dhannipur as comprising 2 hamlets, with a total population of 417 people (210 male and 207 female), in 81 households and 58 physical houses. The area of the village was given as 156 acres.

The 1981 census recorded Dhannipur as having a population of 643 people, in 93 households, and having an area of 61.91 hectares. The main staple foods were listed as wheat and rice.

The 1991 census recorded Dhannipur as having a total population of 753 people (393 male and 360 female), in 92 households and 92 physical houses. The area of the village was listed as 62 hectares. Members of the 0-6 age group numbered 110, or 15% of the total; this group was 51% male (56) and 49% female (54). Members of scheduled castes made up 37% of the village's population, while no members of scheduled tribes were recorded. The literacy rate of the village was 19% (131 men and 14 women). 136 people were classified as main workers (135 men and 1 woman), while 1 person was classified as a marginal worker (a woman); the remaining 574 residents were non-workers. The breakdown of main workers by employment category was as follows: 25 cultivators (i.e. people who owned or leased their own land); 61 agricultural labourers (i.e. people who worked someone else's land in return for payment); 2 workers in livestock, forestry, fishing, hunting, plantations, orchards, etc.; 0 in mining and quarrying; 0 household industry workers; 1 worker employed in other manufacturing, processing, service, and repair roles; 1 construction worker; 18 employed in trade and commerce; 4 employed in transport, storage, and communications; and 22 in other services.
