= Dokanha =

Dokanha Dukanha, Dokanaha
- Village
- Map showing Dokanha (#576) in Khiron CD block

- Location in Uttar Pradesh, India
- Coordinates: 26.2697°N 80.9416°E
- Country: India
- State: Uttar Pradesh
- District: Raebareli

Area
  - Total: 5.341 km^{2} (2.062 sq mi)

Population (2011)
  - Total: 4,009
  - Density: 750.6/km^{2} (1,944/sq mi)

Languages
  - Official: Hindi
- Time zone: UTC+5:30 (IST)
- Vehicle registration: UP-35

Dokanha is a village in Khiron block of Rae Bareli district, Uttar Pradesh, India. It is located 17 km (11 mi) from Lalganj, the tehsil headquarters. As of 2011, it has a population of 4,009 people, in 727 households. It has two primary schools and no healthcare facilities and it hosts a weekly haat but not a permanent market. It belongs to the nyaya panchayat of Tikwamau.

The 1951 census recorded Dokanha (as "Dukanha") as comprising six hamlets, with a population of 1,414 people (778 male and 636 female), in 187 households and 248 physical houses. The area of the village was 1,325 acres (536 ha). 50 residents were literate, all male. The village was listed as belonging to the pargana of Khiron and the thana of Gurbakshganj.

The 1961 census recorded Dokanha (as "Dukanha") as comprising six hamlets, with a total population of 1,657 people (823 male and 834 female), in 305 households and 270 physical houses. The area of the village was given as 1,325 acres (536 ha).

The 1981 census recorded Dokanha (as "Dukanha") as having a population of 2,272 people, in 428 households, and having an area of 535.81 ha (1,324.0 acres). The main staple foods were given as wheat and rice.

The 1991 census recorded Dokanha (as "Dokanaha") as having a total population of 2,677 people (1,306 male and 1,371 female), in 476 households and 475 physical houses. The area of the village was listed as 534 ha (1,320 acres). Members of the 0-6 age group numbered 729, or 27% of the total; this group was 61% male (444) and 39% female (285). Members of scheduled castes made up 34% of the village's population, while no members of scheduled tribes were recorded. The literacy rate of the village was 25% (529 men and 152 women). 766 people were classified as main workers (618 men and 148 women), while 207 people were classified as marginal workers (all women); the remaining 1,704 residents were non-workers. The breakdown of main workers by employment category was as follows: 516 cultivators (i.e. people who owned or leased their own land); 156 agricultural labourers (i.e. people who worked someone else's land in return for payment); two workers in livestock, forestry, fishing, hunting, plantations, orchards, etc.; one in mining and quarrying; 17 household industry workers; no workers employed in other manufacturing, processing, service, and repair roles; no construction workers; nine employed in trade and commerce; five employed in transport, storage, and communications; and 60 in other services.
