= Mirzapur, Raebareli =

Mirzapur Mirzāpur
- Village
- Map showing Mirzapur (#586) in Khiron CD block

- Location in Uttar Pradesh, India
- Coordinates: 26.280169°N 80.898783°E
- Country: India
- State: Uttar Pradesh
- District: Raebareli

Area
  - Total: 1.222 km^{2} (0.472 sq mi)

Population (2011)
  - Total: 648
  - Density: 530/km^{2} (1,370/sq mi)

Languages
  - Official: Hindi
- Time zone: UTC+5:30 (IST)
- Vehicle registration: UP-35

Mirzapur is a village in Khiron block of Rae Bareli district, Uttar Pradesh, India. It is located 16 km from Lalganj, the tehsil headquarters. As of 2011, it has a population of 648 people, in 99 households. It has 1 primary school and no healthcare facilities and does not host a weekly haat or a permanent market. It belongs to the nyaya panchayat of Deogaon.

The 1951 census recorded Mirzapur as comprising 1 hamlet, with a population of 231 people (114 male and 117 female), in 40 households and 39 physical houses. The area of the village was given as 302 acres. 23 residents were literate, all male. The village was listed as belonging to the pargana of Khiron and the thana of Gurbakshganj.

The 1961 census recorded Mirzapur as comprising 1 hamlet, with a population of 274 people (139 male and 135 female), in 44 households and 42 physical houses. The area of the village was given as 302 acres.

The 1981 census recorded Mirzapur as having a population of 439 people, in 61 households, and having an area of 122.22 hectares. The main staple foods were given as wheat and rice.

The 1991 census recorded Mirzapur (as "Mirjapur") as having a population of 432 people (217 male and 215 female), in 63 households and 63 physical houses. The area of the village was listed as 123 hectares. Members of the 0-6 age group numbered 100, or 23% of the total population; this group was 50% male (50) and 50% female (50). Members of scheduled castes made up 28% of the village's population, while no members of scheduled tribes were recorded. The literacy rate of the village was 46% (142 men and 56 women). 102 people were classified as main workers (100 men and 2 women), while 121 people were classified as marginal workers (1 man and 120 women); the remaining 209 residents were non-workers. The breakdown of main workers by employment category was as follows: 92 cultivators (i.e. people who owned or leased their own land); 2 agricultural labourers (i.e. people who worked someone else's land in return for payment); 0 workers in livestock, forestry, fishing, hunting, plantations, orchards, etc.; 0 in mining and quarrying; 0 household industry workers; 4 workers employed in other manufacturing, processing, service, and repair roles; 0 construction workers; 0 employed in trade and commerce; 0 employed in transport, storage, and communications; and 4 in other services.
