= Khanpur Khusti =

Khanpur Khusti Khānpur Khusti
- Village
- Map showing Khanpur Khusti (#585) in Khiron CD block

- Location in Uttar Pradesh, India
- Coordinates: 26.285431°N 80.888469°E
- Country: India
- State: Uttar Pradesh
- District: Raebareli

Area
  - Total: 1.784 km^{2} (0.689 sq mi)

Population (2011)
  - Total: 1,723
  - Density: 965.8/km^{2} (2,501/sq mi)

Languages
  - Official: Hindi
- Time zone: UTC+5:30 (IST)
- Vehicle registration: UP-35

Khanpur Khusti is a village in Khiron block of Rae Bareli district, Uttar Pradesh, India. It is located 14 km from Lalganj, the tehsil headquarters. As of 2011, it has a population of 1,723 people, in 315 households. It has 1 primary school and no healthcare facilities and does not host a weekly haat or a permanent market. It belongs to the nyaya panchayat of Deogaon.

The 1951 census recorded Khanpur Khusti as comprising 4 hamlets, with a total population of 721 people (363 male and 358 female), in 154 households and 152 physical houses. The area of the village was given as 462 acres. 97 residents were literate, 89 male and 8 female. The village was listed as belonging to the pargana of Khiron and the thana of Gurbakshganj. Khanpur Khusti's primary school had 98 students as of 1 January of that year.

The 1961 census recorded Khanpur Khusti as comprising 4 hamlets, with a total population of 820 people (412 male and 408 female), in 167 households and 152 physical houses. The area of the village was given as 462 acres and it had a medical practitioner at the time.

The 1981 census recorded Khanpur Khusti (as "Khanpur Khusthi") as having a population of 1,071 people, in 206 households, and having an area of 188.58 hectares. The main staple foods were given as wheat and rice.

The 1991 census recorded Khanpur Khusti (as "Khanpur Khunti") as having a total population of 1,176 people (591 male and 585 female), in 212 households and 211 physical houses. The area of the village was listed as 179 hectares. Members of the 0-6 age group numbered 226, or 19% of the total; this group was 46% male (105) and 54% female (121). Members of scheduled castes numbered 249, or 21% of the village's total population, while no members of scheduled tribes were recorded. The literacy rate of the village was 42% (352 men and 144 women). 410 people were classified as main workers (304 men and 106 women), while 204 people were classified as marginal workers (all women); the remaining 562 residents were non-workers. The breakdown of main workers by employment category was as follows: 211 cultivators (i.e. people who owned or leased their own land); 138 agricultural labourers (i.e. people who worked someone else's land in return for payment); 0 workers in livestock, forestry, fishing, hunting, plantations, orchards, etc.; 0 in mining and quarrying; 30 household industry workers; 0 workers employed in other manufacturing, processing, service, and repair roles; 0 construction workers; 2 employed in trade and commerce; 6 employed in transport, storage, and communications; and 23 in other services.
