= Sadullahpur, Raebareli =

Sadullahpur Sadullāhpur
- Village
- Map showing Sadullahpur (#552) in Khiron CD block

- Location in Uttar Pradesh, India
- Coordinates: 26.312997°N 80.879644°E
- Country: India
- State: Uttar Pradesh
- District: Raebareli

Area
  - Total: 0.908 km^{2} (0.351 sq mi)

Population (2011)
  - Total: 796
  - Density: 877/km^{2} (2,270/sq mi)

Languages
  - Official: Hindi
- Time zone: UTC+5:30 (IST)
- Vehicle registration: UP-35

Sadullahpur is a village in Khiron block of Rae Bareli district, Uttar Pradesh, India. It is located 17 km from Lalganj, the tehsil headquarters. As of 2011, it has a population of 796 people, in 172 households. It has one primary school and no healthcare facilities and it does not host a weekly haat or permanent market. It belongs to the nyaya panchayat of Paho.

The 1951 census recorded Sadullahpur as comprising 1 hamlet, with a total population of 262 people (121 male and 141 female), in 50 households and 45 physical houses. The area of the village was given as 229 acres. 11 residents were literate, 10 male and 1 female. The village was listed as belonging to the pargana of Khiron and the thana of Gurbakshganj.

The 1961 census recorded Sadullahpur (as "Sadullapur") as comprising 1 hamlet, with a total population of 299 people (152 male and 147 female), in 54 households and 54 physical houses. The area of the village was given as 229 acres.

The 1981 census recorded Sadullahpur (as "Sadullapur") as having a population of 386 people, in 75 households, and having an area of 80.53 hectares. The main staple foods were given as wheat and rice.

The 1991 census recorded Sadullahpur (as "Sadullapur") as having a total population of 486 people (262 male and 224 female), in 81 households and 81 physical houses. The area of the village was listed as 94 hectares. Members of the 0-6 age group numbered 99, or 20% of the total; this group was 54% male (53) and 46% female (46). Members of scheduled castes made up 36% of the village's population, while no members of scheduled tribes were recorded. The literacy rate of the village was 43% (158 men and 52 women). 155 people were classified as main workers (142 men and 13 women), while 3 people were classified as marginal workers (all women); the remaining 328 residents were non-workers. The breakdown of main workers by employment category was as follows: 138 cultivators (i.e. people who owned or leased their own land); 10 agricultural labourers (i.e. people who worked someone else's land in return for payment); 1 worker in livestock, forestry, fishing, hunting, plantations, orchards, etc.; 0 in mining and quarrying; 0 household industry workers; 0 workers employed in other manufacturing, processing, service, and repair roles; 0 construction workers; 0 employed in trade and commerce; 0 employed in transport, storage, and communications; and 6 in other services.
