= Dhurai =

- Village
- Map showing Dhurai (#548) in Khiron CD block

- Location in Uttar Pradesh, India
- Coordinates: 26.335436°N 80.914347°E
- Country: India
- State: Uttar Pradesh
- District: Raebareli

Area
  - Total: 5.942 km^{2} (2.294 sq mi)

Population (2011)
  - Total: 4,481
  - Density: 754.1/km^{2} (1,953/sq mi)

Languages
  - Official: Hindi
- Time zone: UTC+5:30 (IST)
- Vehicle registration: UP-35

Dhurai is a village in Khiron block of Rae Bareli district, Uttar Pradesh, India. It is located 19 km from Lalganj, the tehsil headquarters. As of 2011, it has a population of 4,481 people, in 867 households. It has 2 primary schools and no healthcare facilities and it hosts both a weekly haat and a permanent market. It belongs to the nyaya panchayat of Paho.

The 1951 census recorded Dhurai as comprising 15 hamlets, with a total population of 1,547 people (766 male and 781 female), in 299 households and 273 physical houses. The area of the village was given as 1,497 acres. 45 residents were literate, 44 male and 1 female. The village was listed as belonging to the pargana of Khiron and the thana of Gurbakshganj.

The 1961 census recorded Dhurai as comprising 14 hamlets, with a total population of 1,759 people (884 male and 875 female), in 345 households and 321 physical houses. The area of the village was given as 1,497 acres.

The 1981 census recorded Dhurai as having a population of 2,449 people, in 440 households, and having an area of 594.08 hectares. The main staple foods were given as wheat and rice.

The 1991 census recorded Dhurai (as "Dhurayee") as having a total population of 3,137 people (1,622 male and 1,515 female), in 526 households and 518 physical houses. The area of the village was listed as 594 hectares. Members of the 0-6 age group numbered 669, or 21% of the total; this group was 50% male (334) and 50% female (335). Members of scheduled castes made up 27% of the village's population, while no members of scheduled tribes were recorded. The literacy rate of the village was 22% (572 men and 122 women). 987 people were classified as main workers (792 men and 195 women), while 345 people were classified as marginal workers (12 men and 333 women); the remaining 1,805 residents were non-workers. The breakdown of main workers by employment category was as follows: 679 cultivators (i.e. people who owned or leased their own land); 121 agricultural labourers (i.e. people who worked someone else's land in return for payment); 0 workers in livestock, forestry, fishing, hunting, plantations, orchards, etc.; 0 in mining and quarrying; 1 household industry worker; 10 workers employed in other manufacturing, processing, service, and repair roles; 0 construction workers; 8 employed in trade and commerce; 0 employed in transport, storage, and communications; and 21 in other services.

== Archaeology ==
During an archaeological survey of Raebareli district in the late 1990s, archaeologists D. P. Tewari and Anoop Kumar Singh encountered various redware and brickbats at Dhurai, which they dated tentatively to the Gupta to early medieval period.
