= Basgawan =

Basgawan Basgawān
- Village
- Map showing Basgawan (#568) in Khiron CD block

- Location in Uttar Pradesh, India
- Coordinates: 26.304144°N 81.010792°E
- Country: India
- State: Uttar Pradesh
- District: Raebareli

Area
  - Total: 2.222 km^{2} (0.858 sq mi)

Population (2011)
  - Total: 747
  - Density: 336/km^{2} (871/sq mi)

Languages
  - Official: Hindi
- Time zone: UTC+5:30 (IST)
- Vehicle registration: UP-35

Basgawan is a village in Khiron block of Rae Bareli district, Uttar Pradesh, India. It is located 13 km from Lalganj, the tehsil headquarters. As of 2011, it has a population of 747 people, in 142 households. It has 1 primary school, no healthcare facilities and does not host a weekly haat or a permanent market. It belongs to the nyaya panchayat of Bhitargaon.

The 1951 census recorded Basgawan as comprising 1 hamlet, with a population of 265 people (123 male and 142 female), in 51 households and 47 physical houses. The area of the village was given as 573 acres. 7 residents were literate, all male. The village was listed as belonging to the pargana of Khiron and the thana of Gurbakshganj.

The 1961 census recorded Basgawan as comprising 1 hamlet, with a total population of 311 people (164 male and 147 female), in 91 households and 82 physical houses. The area of the village was given as 573 acres.

The 1981 census recorded Basgawan as having a population of 504 people, in 81 households, and having an area of 232.69 hectares. The main staple foods were given as wheat and rice.

The 1991 census recorded Basgawan (as "Basigawan") as having a total population of 510 people (292 male and 218 female), in 89 households and 88 physical houses. The area of the village was listed as 223 hectares. Members of the 0-6 age group numbered 71, or 14% of the total; this group was 51% male (36) and 49% female (35). Members of scheduled castes made up 33.5% of the village's population, while no members of scheduled tribes were recorded. The literacy rate of the village was 40% (158 men and 46 women). 149 people were classified as main workers (127 men and 22 women), while 97 people were classified as marginal workers (all women); the remaining 264 residents were non-workers. The breakdown of main workers by employment category was as follows: 124 cultivators (i.e. people who owned or leased their own land); 14 agricultural labourers (i.e. people who worked someone else's land in return for payment); 0 workers in livestock, forestry, fishing, hunting, plantations, orchards, etc.; 0 in mining and quarrying; 0 household industry workers; 3 workers employed in other manufacturing, processing, service, and repair roles; 0 construction workers; 2 employed in trade and commerce; 0 employed in transport, storage, and communications; and 6 in other services.
