= Kamalpur, Khiron =

Kamalpur Kamālpur
- Village
- Map showing Kamalpur (#580) in Khiron CD block

- Location in Uttar Pradesh, India
- Coordinates: 26.2551°N 80.9778°E
- Country: India
- State: Uttar Pradesh
- District: Raebareli

Area
  - Total: 1.848 km^{2} (0.714 sq mi)

Population (2011)
  - Total: 1,118
  - Density: 605.0/km^{2} (1,567/sq mi)

Languages
  - Official: Hindi
- Time zone: UTC+5:30 (IST)
- Vehicle registration: UP-35

Kamalpur is a village in Khiron block of Rae Bareli district, Uttar Pradesh, India. It is located 17 km (11 mi) from Lalganj, the tehsil headquarters. As of 2011, it has a population of 1,118 people, in 242 households. It has one primary school, but has no healthcare facilities, weekly haat or permanent market. It belongs to the nyaya panchayat of Tikwamau.

The 1951 census recorded Kamalpur as comprising three hamlets, with a population of 480 people (241 male and 239 female), in 95 households and 93 physical houses. The area of the village was given as 460 acres (190 ha). 15 residents were literate, all male. The village was listed as belonging to the pargana of Khiron and the thana of Gurbakshganj.

The 1961 census recorded Kamalpur as comprising two hamlets, with a total population of 551 people (278 male and 273 female), in 108 households and 95 physical houses. The area of the village was given as 460 acres (190 ha).

The 1981 census recorded Kamalpur as having a population of 737 people, in 140 households, and having an area of 184.53 hectares. The main staple foods were given as wheat and rice.

The 1991 census recorded Kamalpur as having a total population of 796 people (371 male and 425 female), in 161 households and 161 physical houses. The area of the village was listed as 185 hectares (460 acres). Members of the 0-6 age group numbered 153, or 19% of the total; this group was 41% male (63) and 59% female (90). Members of scheduled castes made up 35% of the village's population, while no members of scheduled tribes were recorded. The literacy rate of the village was 36% (203 men and 83 women). 232 people were classified as main workers (192 men and 102 women), while no people were classified as marginal workers; the remaining 564 residents were non-workers. The breakdown of main workers by employment category was as follows: 182 cultivators (i.e. people who owned or leased their own land); 43 agricultural labourers (i.e. people who worked someone else's land in return for payment); no workers in livestock, forestry, fishing, hunting, plantations, orchards, etc.; no in mining and quarrying; no household industry workers; some workers employed in other manufacturing, processing, service, and repair roles; no construction workers; no employed in trade and commerce; no employed in transport, storage, and communications; and seven in other services.<ref name="Census 1991"/
