= Dahirapur =

- Village
- Map showing Dahirapur (#582) in Khiron CD block

- Location in Uttar Pradesh, India
- Coordinates: 26.2602°N 81.0043°E
- Country: India
- State: Uttar Pradesh
- District: Raebareli

Area
  - Total: 0.526 km^{2} (0.203 sq mi)

Population (2011)
  - Total: 386
  - Density: 734/km^{2} (1,900/sq mi)

Languages
  - Official: Hindi
- Time zone: UTC+5:30 (IST)
- Vehicle registration: UP-35

Dahirapur is a village in Khiron block of Rae Bareli district, Uttar Pradesh, India. It is located 12 km (7.5 mi) from Lalganj, the tehsil headquarters. As of 2011, it has a population of 386 people, in 81 households. It has a public school and no healthcare facilities and does not host a weekly haat or a permanent market. It belongs to the nyaya panchayat of Tikwamau.

The 1951 census recorded Dahirapur as comprising one hamlet, with a population of 176 people (99 male and 77 female), in 35 households and 35 physical houses. The area of the village was given as 128 acres (52 ha). Only 12 residents were literate, all of them male. The village was listed as belonging to the pargana of Khiron and the thana of Khiro.

The 1961 census recorded Dahirapur as comprising 1 hamlet, with a population of 231 people (108 male and 126 female), in 40 households and 40 physical houses. The area of the village was given as 128 acres (52 ha).

The 1981 census recorded Dahirapur as having a population of 326 people, in 53 households, and having an area of 52.61 ha (130.0 acres). The main staple foods were given as wheat and rice.

The 1991 census recorded Dahirapur as having a total population of 359 people (181 male and 178 female), in 57 households and 57 physical houses. The area of the village was listed as 53 ha (130 acres). Members of the 0-6 age group numbered 62, or 17% of the total; this group was 45% male (28) and 55% female (34). Members of scheduled castes made up 17% of the village's population, while no members of scheduled tribes were recorded. The literacy rate of the village was 77% ( 200 men and 81 women). 147 people were classified as main workers (94 men and 53 women), while no people were classified as marginal workers; the remaining 212 residents were non-workers. The breakdown of main workers by employment category was as follows: 99 cultivators (i.e. people who owned or leased their own land); 27 agricultural labourers (i.e. people who worked someone else's land in return for payment); no workers in livestock, forestry, fishing, hunting, plantations, orchards, etc.; no in mining and quarrying; no household industry workers; six workers employed in other manufacturing, processing, service, and repair roles; no construction workers; one employed in trade and commerce; no employed in transport, storage, and communications; and 14 in other services.
