= Majhgawan, Khiron =

Majhgawan Majhgawān, Majhigawan
- Village
- Map showing Majhgawan (#590) in Khiron CD block

- Location in Uttar Pradesh, India
- Coordinates: 26.260774°N 80.910286°E
- Country: India
- State: Uttar Pradesh
- District: Raebareli

Area
  - Total: 1.027 km^{2} (0.397 sq mi)

Population (2011)
  - Total: 782
  - Density: 761/km^{2} (1,970/sq mi)

Languages
  - Official: Hindi
- Time zone: UTC+5:30 (IST)
- Vehicle registration: UP-35

Majhgawan, also spelled Majhigawan, is a village in Khiron block of Rae Bareli district, Uttar Pradesh, India. It is located 14 km from Lalganj, the tehsil headquarters. As of 2011, it has a population of 782 people, in 146 households. The village has no school, healthcare facilities, weekly haat or permanent market. It belongs to the nyaya panchayat of Deogaon.

The 1951 census recorded Majhgawan as comprising 3 hamlets, with a population of 230 people (112 male and 118 female), in 41 households and 36 physical houses. The area of the village was given as 237 acres. 26 residents were literate, 25 male and 1 female. The village was listed as belonging to the pargana of Khiron and the thana of Gurbakshganj.

The 1961 census recorded Majhgawan (as "Majhigawan") as comprising 3 hamlets, with a total population of 283 people (139 male and 144 female), in 45 households and 42 physical houses. The area of the village was given as 237 acres.

The 1981 census recorded Majhgawan (as "Majhigawan") as having a population of 459 people, in 85 households, and having an area of 136.79 hectares. The main staple foods were given as wheat and rice.

The 1991 census recorded Majhgawan (as "Majhigawan") as having a total population of 529 people (258 male and 271 female), in 88 households and 88 physical houses. The area of the village was listed as 96 hectares. Members of the 0-6 age group numbered 93, or 18% of the total; this group was 45% male (42) and 55% female (51). Members of scheduled castes made up 21% of the village's population, while no members of scheduled tribes were recorded. The literacy rate of the village was 32% (135 men and 32 women). 123 people were classified as main workers (all men), while 149 people were classified as marginal workers (all women); the remaining 257 residents were non-workers. The breakdown of main workers by employment category was as follows: 110 cultivators (i.e. people who owned or leased their own land); 0 agricultural labourers (i.e. people who worked someone else's land in return for payment); 1 worker in livestock, forestry, fishing, hunting, plantations, orchards, etc.; 0 in mining and quarrying; 0 household industry workers; 0 workers employed in other manufacturing, processing, service, and repair roles; 0 construction workers; 0 employed in trade and commerce; 0 employed in transport, storage, and communications; and 12 in other services.
