= Chandemau =

Chandemau Chāndemau
- Village
- Map showing Chandemau (#570) in Khiron CD block

- Location in Uttar Pradesh, India
- Coordinates: 26.295872°N 81.001612°E
- Country: India
- State: Uttar Pradesh
- District: Raebareli

Area
  - Total: 1.719 km^{2} (0.664 sq mi)

Population (2011)
  - Total: 1,135
  - Density: 660.3/km^{2} (1,710/sq mi)

Languages
  - Official: Hindi
- Time zone: UTC+5:30 (IST)
- Vehicle registration: UP-35

Chandemau is a village in Khiron block of Rae Bareli district, Uttar Pradesh, India. It is located 18 km from Lalganj, the tehsil headquarters. As of 2011, it has a population of 1,135 people, in 230 households. The village has 1 primary school, but no formal healthcare facilities, weekly haat or permanent market. It belongs to the nyaya panchayat of Bhitargaon.

The 1951 census recorded Chandemau (as "Chande Mau") as comprising 5 hamlets, with a population of 327 people (181 male and 146 female), in 58 households and 68 physical houses. The area of the village was given as 444 acres. 4 residents were literate, all male. The village was listed as belonging to the pargana of Khiron and the thana of Gurbakshganj.

The 1961 census recorded Chandemau as comprising 5 hamlets, with a total population of 385 people (214 male and 171 female), in 76 households and 66 physical houses. The area of the village was given as 444 acres.

The 1981 census recorded Chandemau (as "Chandeymau") as having a population of 640 people, in 132 households, and having an area of 173.60 hectares. The main staple foods were given as wheat and rice.

The 1991 census recorded Chandemau (as "Chande Mau") as having a total population of 749 people (371 male and 378 female), in 134 households and 134 physical houses. The area of the village was listed as 172 hectares. Members of the 0-6 age group numbered 179, or 24% of the total; this group was 58% male (104) and 42% female (75). Members of scheduled castes made up 31% of the village's population, while no members of scheduled tribes were recorded. The literacy rate of the village was 17% (91 men and 39 women). 324 people were classified as main workers (158 men and 166 women), while 0 people were classified as marginal workers; the remaining 425 residents were non-workers. The breakdown of main workers by employment category was as follows: 260 cultivators (i.e. people who owned or leased their own land); 63 agricultural labourers (i.e. people who worked someone else's land in return for payment); 0 workers in livestock, forestry, fishing, hunting, plantations, orchards, etc.; 0 in mining and quarrying; 0 household industry workers; 0 workers employed in other manufacturing, processing, service, and repair roles; 0 construction workers; 1 employed in trade and commerce; 0 employed in transport, storage, and communications; and 0 in other services.
