= Dhanabhad =

Dhanabhad Dhanābhād
- Village
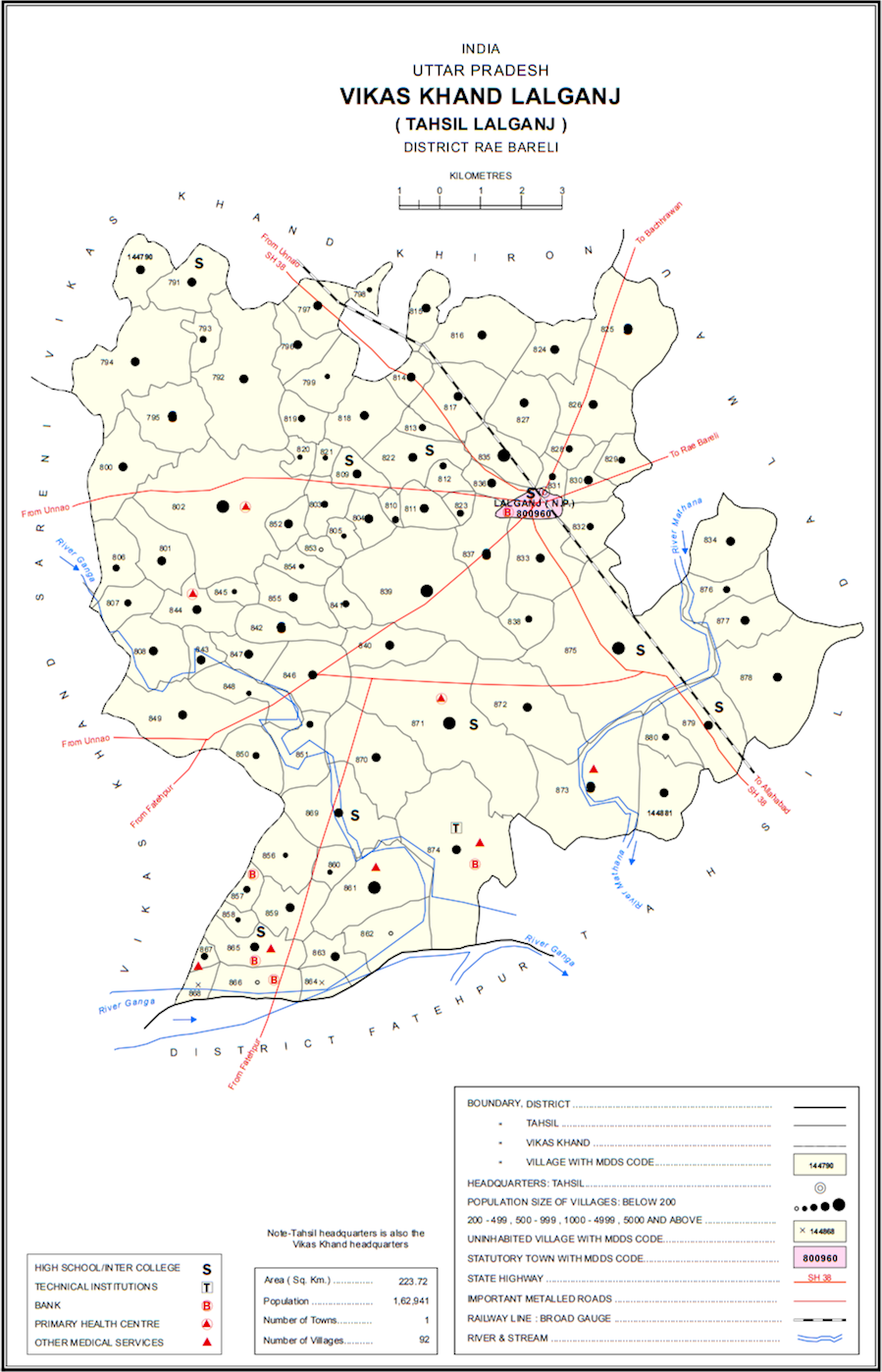
- Map showing Dhanabhad (#817) in Lalganj CD block

- Location in Uttar Pradesh, India
- Coordinates: 26.197715°N 80.958231°E
- Country: India
- State: Uttar Pradesh
- District: Raebareli

Area
  - Total: 2.553 km^{2} (0.986 sq mi)

Population (2011)
  - Total: 2,007
  - Density: 786.1/km^{2} (2,036/sq mi)

Languages
  - Official: Hindi
- Time zone: UTC+5:30 (IST)
- Vehicle registration: UP-35

Dhanabhad is a village in Lalganj block of Rae Bareli district, Uttar Pradesh, India. It is located 3 km from Lalganj, the block and tehsil headquarters. As of 2011, it has a population of 2,007 people, in 325 households. It has 1 primary school, no healthcare facilities, permanent market or weekly haat. It belongs to the nyaya panchayat of Mubarakpur.

The 1951 census recorded Dhanabhad (as "Dhanbhad") as comprising 5 hamlets, with a population of 651 people (331 male and 320 female), in 126 households and 112 physical houses. The area of the village was given as 633 acres. 58 residents were literate, 48 male and 10 female. The village was listed as belonging to the pargana of Khiron and the thana of Dalmau.

The 1961 census recorded Dhanabhad (as "Dhanabad") as comprising 4 hamlets, with a total population of 759 people (379 male and 380 female), in 131 households and 129 physical houses. The area of the village was given as 633 acres.

The 1981 census recorded Dhanabhad as having a population of 969 people, in 183 households, and having an area of 255.36 hectares. The main staple foods were listed as wheat and rice.

The 1991 census recorded Dhanabhad (as "Dhana Bhad") as having a total population of 1,299 people (672 male and 627 female), in 219 households and 219 physical houses. The area of the village was listed as 255 hectares. Members of the 0-6 age group numbered 250, or 19% of the total; this group was 53% male (132) and 47% female (118). Members of scheduled castes made up 47% of the village's population, while no members of scheduled tribes were recorded. The literacy rate of the village was 39% (378 men and 129 women). 476 people were classified as main workers (345 men and 131 women), while 0 people were classified as marginal workers; the remaining 823 residents were non-workers. The breakdown of main workers by employment category was as follows: 245 cultivators (i.e. people who owned or leased their own land); 140 agricultural labourers (i.e. people who worked someone else's land in return for payment); 0 workers in livestock, forestry, fishing, hunting, plantations, orchards, etc.; 0 in mining and quarrying; 3 household industry workers; 5 workers employed in other manufacturing, processing, service, and repair roles; 7 construction workers; 12 employed in trade and commerce; 10 employed in transport, storage, and communications; and 54 in other services.
