= Akhaupur =

- Village
- Map showing Akhaupur (#581) in Khiron CD block

- Location in Uttar Pradesh, India
- Coordinates: 26.2614°N 80.9937°E
- Country: India
- State: Uttar Pradesh
- District: Raebareli

Area
  - Total: 1.811 km^{2} (0.699 sq mi)

Population (2011)
  - Total: 1,338
  - Density: 738.8/km^{2} (1,914/sq mi)

Languages
  - Official: Hindi
- Time zone: UTC+5:30 (IST)
- Vehicle registration: UP-35

Akhaupur is a village in Khiron block of Rae Bareli district, Uttar Pradesh, India. It is located 18 km (11 mi) from Lalganj, the tehsil headquarters. As of 2011, it has a population of 1,338 people, in 258 households. It has one primary school and no healthcare facilities and it does not host a weekly haat or a permanent market. It belongs to the nyaya panchayat of Tikwamau.

The 1951 census recorded Akhaupur (as "Akhaopur") as comprising three hamlets, with a population of 529 people (276 male and 253 female), in 97 households and 97 physical houses. The area of the village was given as 438 acres (177 ha). nine residents were literate, all male. The village was listed as belonging to the pargana of Khiron and the thana of Gurbakshganj.

The 1961 census recorded Akhaupur as comprising four hamlets, with a population of 651 people (312 male and 339 female), in 117 households and 110 physical houses. The area of the village was given as 438 acres (177 ha).

The 1981 census recorded Akhaupur as having a population of 853 people, in 157 households, and having an area of 178.06 ha (440.0 acres). The main staple foods were given as wheat and rice.

The 1991 census recorded Akhaupur as having a population of 947 people (467 male and 480 female), in 176 households and 176 physical houses. The area of the village was listed as 81 hectares (200 acres). Members of the 0-6 age group numbered 199q, or 21% of the total; this group was 57% male (113) and 43% female (86). Members of scheduled castes made up 26% of the village's population, while no members of scheduled tribes were recorded. The literacy rate of the village was 35% (236 men and 96 women). 216 people were classified as main workers (211 men and 5 women), while 136 people were classified as marginal workers (all women); the remaining 595 residents were non-workers. The breakdown of main workers by employment category was as follows: 186 cultivators (i.e. people who owned or leased their own land); 16 agricultural labourers (i.e. people who worked someone else's land in return for payment); no workers in livestock, forestry, fishing, hunting, plantations, orchards, etc.; no in mining and quarrying; no household industry workers; no workers employed in other manufacturing, processing, service, and repair roles; one construction worker; five employed in trade and commerce; three employed in transport, storage, and communications; and five in other services.
