= Mohanpur, Khiron =

Mohanpur
- Village
- Map showing Mohanpur (#551) in Khiron CD block

- Location in Uttar Pradesh, India
- Coordinates: 26.322162°N 80.892959°E
- Country: India
- State: Uttar Pradesh
- District: Raebareli

Area
  - Total: 0.283 km^{2} (0.109 sq mi)

Population (2011)
  - Total: 425
  - Density: 1,500/km^{2} (3,890/sq mi)

Languages
  - Official: Hindi
- Time zone: UTC+5:30 (IST)
- Vehicle registration: UP-35

Mohanpur is a village in Khiron block of Rae Bareli district, Uttar Pradesh, India. It is located 22 km from Lalganj, the tehsil headquarters. As of 2011, it has a population of 425 people, in 78 households. It has no schools and no healthcare facilities and does not host a weekly haat or permanent market. It belongs to the nyaya panchayat of Paho.

The 1951 census recorded Mohanpur as comprising 1 hamlet, with a total population of 88 people (42 male and 46 female), in 15 households and 15 physical houses. The area of the village was given as 71 acres. 5 residents were literate, all male. The village was listed as belonging to the pargana of Khiron and the thana of Gurbakshganj.

The 1961 census recorded Mohanpur as comprising 1 hamlet, with a total population of 113 people (56 male and 57 female), in 15 households and 15 physical houses. The area of the village was given as 71 acres.

The 1981 census recorded Mohanpur as having a population of 182 people, in 31 households, and having an area of 28.33 hectares. The main staple foods were given as wheat and rice.

The 1991 census recorded Mohanpur as having a total population of 289 people (149 male and 140 female), in 46 households and 46 physical houses. The area of the village was listed as 28 hectares. Members of the 0-6 age group numbered 60, or 21% of the total; this group was 48% male (29) and 52% female (31). Members of scheduled castes made up 29% of the village's population, while no members of scheduled tribes were recorded. The literacy rate of the village was 32.5% (80 men and 14 women). 72 people were classified as main workers (all men), while 0 people were classified as marginal workers; the remaining 217 residents were non-workers. The breakdown of main workers by employment category was as follows: 66 cultivators (i.e. people who owned or leased their own land); 0 agricultural labourers (i.e. people who worked someone else's land in return for payment); 1 worker in livestock, forestry, fishing, hunting, plantations, orchards, etc.; 0 in mining and quarrying; 0 household industry workers; 1 worker employed in other manufacturing, processing, service, and repair roles; 0 construction workers; 0 employed in trade and commerce; 4 employed in transport, storage, and communications; and 0 in other services.
