= Khargapur, Raebareli =

Khargapur Khargāpur
- Village
- Map showing Khargapur (#607) in Khiron CD block

- Location in Uttar Pradesh, India
- Coordinates: 26.232222°N 80.839127°E
- Country: India
- State: Uttar Pradesh
- District: Raebareli

Area
  - Total: 1.958 km^{2} (0.756 sq mi)

Population (2011)
  - Total: 2,246
  - Density: 1,147/km^{2} (2,971/sq mi)

Languages
  - Official: Hindi
- Time zone: UTC+5:30 (IST)
- Vehicle registration: UP-35

Khargapur is a village in Khiron block of Rae Bareli district, Uttar Pradesh, India. It is located 13 km from Lalganj, the tehsil headquarters. As of 2011, it has a population of 2,246 people, in 397 households. It has 1 primary school, no healthcare facilities and does not host a weekly haat or a permanent market. It belongs to the nyaya panchayat of Bakuliha.

The 1951 census recorded Khargapur as comprising 5 hamlets, with a population of 753 people (422 male and 331 female), in 150 households and 149 physical houses. The area of the village was given as 470 acres. 81 residents were literate, 76 male and 5 female. The village was listed as belonging to the pargana of Khiron and the thana of Gurbakhshganj.

The 1961 census recorded Khargapur as comprising 5 hamlets, with a total population of 942 people (495 male and 447 female), in 185 households and 167 physical houses. The area of the village was given as 470 acres.

The 1981 census recorded Khargapur as having a population of 1,279 people, in 232 households, and having an area of 195.46 hectares. The main staple foods were given as wheat and rice.

The 1991 census recorded Khargapur as having a total population of 1,466 people (742 male and 724 female), in 261 households and 261 physical houses. The area of the village was listed as 196 hectares. Members of the 0-6 age group numbered 286, or 19.5% of the total; this group was 52% male (148) and 48% female (138). Members of scheduled castes numbered 252, or 17% of the village's total population, while no members of scheduled tribes were recorded. The literacy rate of the village was 25% (275 men and 97 women). 483 people were classified as main workers (365 men and 118 women), while 56 people were classified as marginal workers (3 men and 53 women); the remaining 927 residents were non-workers. The breakdown of main workers by employment category was as follows: 378 cultivators (i.e. people who owned or leased their own land); 66 agricultural labourers (i.e. people who worked someone else's land in return for payment); 6 workers in livestock, forestry, fishing, hunting, plantations, orchards, etc.; 0 in mining and quarrying; 7 household industry workers; 4 workers employed in other manufacturing, processing, service, and repair roles; 0 construction workers; 5 employed in trade and commerce; 3 employed in transport, storage, and communications; and 14 in other services.
