= Dumtahar =

- Village
- Map showing Dumtahar (#546) in Khiron CD block

- Location in Uttar Pradesh, India
- Coordinates: 26.333566°N 80.884699°E
- Country: India
- State: Uttar Pradesh
- District: Raebareli

Area
  - Total: 3.268 km^{2} (1.262 sq mi)

Population (2011)
  - Total: 2,577
  - Density: 788.6/km^{2} (2,042/sq mi)

Languages
  - Official: Hindi
- Time zone: UTC+5:30 (IST)
- Vehicle registration: UP-35

Dumtahar is a village in Khiron block of Rae Bareli district, Uttar Pradesh, India. It is located 16 km from Lalganj, the tehsil headquarters. As of 2011, it has a population of 2,577 people, in 540 households. It has 3 primary schools and no healthcare facilities and it hosts a weekly haat but not a permanent market. It belongs to the nyaya panchayat of Paho.

The 1951 census recorded Dumtahar as comprising 6 hamlets, with a total population of 831 people (426 male and 405 female), in 173 households and 171 physical houses. The area of the village was given as 815 acres. 43 residents were literate, all male. The village was listed as belonging to the pargana of Khiron and the thana of Gurbakshganj.

The 1961 census recorded Dumtahar (as "Dumta Har") as comprising 6 hamlets, with a total population of 980 people (485 male and 495 female), in 195 households and 175 physical houses. The area of the village was given as 815 acres.

The 1981 census recorded Dumtahar as having a population of 922 people, in 278 households, and having an area of 326.99 hectares. The main staple foods were given as wheat and rice.

The 1991 census recorded Dumtahar (as "Dumarher") as having a total population of 1,772 people (897 male and 875 female), in 330 households and 323 physical houses. The area of the village was listed as 327 hectares. Members of the 0-6 age group numbered 409, or 23% of the total; this group was 54% male (222) and 46% female (187). Members of scheduled castes made up 64% of the village's population, while no members of scheduled tribes were recorded. The literacy rate of the village was 19.5% (288 men and 58 women). 584 people were classified as main workers (406 men and 178 women), while 248 people were classified as marginal workers (50 men and 192 women); the remaining 946 residents were non-workers. The breakdown of main workers by employment category was as follows: 409 cultivators (i.e. people who owned or leased their own land); 138 agricultural labourers (i.e. people who worked someone else's land in return for payment); 1 worker in livestock, forestry, fishing, hunting, plantations, orchards, etc.; 1 in mining and quarrying; 3 household industry workers; 5 workers employed in other manufacturing, processing, service, and repair roles; 2 construction workers; 2 employed in trade and commerce; 0 employed in transport, storage, and communications; and 23 in other services.
