= Miramau =

Miramau Mirāmau
- Village
- Map showing Miramau (#571) in Khiron CD block

- Location in Uttar Pradesh, India
- Coordinates: 26.289562°N 81.003472°E
- Country: India
- State: Uttar Pradesh
- District: Raebareli

Area
  - Total: 0.925 km^{2} (0.357 sq mi)

Population (2011)
  - Total: 1,057
  - Density: 1,140/km^{2} (2,960/sq mi)

Languages
  - Official: Hindi
- Time zone: UTC+5:30 (IST)
- Vehicle registration: UP-35

Miramau is a village in Khiron block of Rae Bareli district, Uttar Pradesh, India. It is located 14 km from Lalganj, the tehsil headquarters. As of 2011, it has a population of 1,057 people, in 228 households. It has 1 primary school, but has no formal healthcare facilities, weekly haat or permanent market. It belongs to the nyaya panchayat of Bhitargaon.

The 1951 census recorded Miramau (as "Maira Mau") as comprising 3 hamlets, with a total population of 449 people (238 male and 221 female), in 87 households and 81 physical houses. The area of the village was given as 231 acres. 25 residents were literate, 24 male and 1 female. The village was listed as belonging to the pargana of Khiron and the thana of Gurbakshganj.

The 1961 census recorded Miramau as comprising 3 hamlets, with a total population of 500 people (267 male and 233 female), in 105 households and 105 physical houses. The area of the village was given as 231 acres.

The 1981 census recorded Miramau (as "Meramau") as having a population of 642 people, in 137 households, and having an area of 92.27 hectares. The main staple foods were given as wheat and rice.

The 1991 census recorded Miramau (as "Mera Mau") as having a total population of 955 people (485 male and 470 female), in 161 households and 161 physical houses. The area of the village was listed as 93 hectares. Members of the 0-6 age group numbered 190, or 20% of the total; this group was 45% male (86) and 55% female (104). Members of scheduled castes made up 46% of the village's population, while no members of scheduled tribes were recorded. The literacy rate of the village was 27% (182 men and 76 women). 484 people were classified as main workers (251 men and 233 women), while 0 people were classified as marginal workers; the remaining 471 residents were non-workers. The breakdown of main workers by employment category was as follows: 477 cultivators (i.e. people who owned or leased their own land); 3 agricultural labourers (i.e. people who worked someone else's land in return for payment); 0 workers in livestock, forestry, fishing, hunting, plantations, orchards, etc.; 0 in mining and quarrying; 0 household industry workers; 0 workers employed in other manufacturing, processing, service, and repair roles; 0 construction workers; 0 employed in trade and commerce; 0 employed in transport, storage, and communications; and 4 in other services.
