= Nunera, Raebareli =

Nunera
- Village
- Map showing Nunera (#577) in Khiron CD block

- Location in Uttar Pradesh, India
- Coordinates: 26.2538°N 80.9484°E
- Country: India
- State: Uttar Pradesh
- District: Raebareli

Area
  - Total: 1.756 km^{2} (0.678 sq mi)

Population (2011)
  - Total: 1,717
  - Density: 977.8/km^{2} (2,532/sq mi)

Languages
  - Official: Hindi
- Time zone: UTC+5:30 (IST)
- Vehicle registration: UP-35

Nunera is a village in Khiron block of Rae Bareli district, Uttar Pradesh, India. It is located 18 km (11 mi) from Lalganj, the tehsil headquarters. As of 2011, it has a population of 1,717 people, in 302 households. It has two primary schools and no healthcare facilities and does not host a weekly haat or a permanent market. It belongs to the nyaya panchayat of Tikwamau.

The 1951 census recorded Nunera (as "Nonera") as comprising two hamlets, with a total population of 521 people (276 male and 245 female), in 109 households and 100 physical houses. The area of the village was given as 446 acres (180 ha). 4 residents were literate, all male. The village was listed as belonging to the pargana of Khiron and the thana of Gurbakshganj.

The 1961 census recorded Nunera (as "Nonera") as comprising two hamlets, with a total population of 655 people (316 male and 339 female), in 141 households and 129 physical houses. The area of the village was given as 446 acres (180 ha).

The 1981 census recorded Nunera (as "Nounera") as having a population of 893 people, in 173 households, and having an area of 175.63 ha (434.0 acres). The main staple foods were given as wheat and rice.

The 1991 census recorded Nunera as having a total population of 996 people (501 male and 495 female), in 197 households and 197 physical houses. The area of the village was listed as 175 ha (430 acres). Members of the 0-6 age group numbered 198, or 20% of the total; this group was 52% male (102) and 48% female (96). Members of scheduled castes made up 23% of the village's population, while no members of scheduled tribes were recorded. The literacy rate of the village was 29% (234 men and 55 women). 374 people were classified as main workers (223 men and 151 women), while no people were classified as marginal workers; the remaining 622 residents were non-workers. The breakdown of main workers by employment category was as follows: 333 cultivators (i.e. people who owned or leased their own land); 29 agricultural labourers (i.e. people who worked someone else's land in return for payment); no workers in livestock, forestry, fishing, hunting, plantations, orchards, etc.; no in mining and quarrying; two household industry workers; one worker employed in other manufacturing, processing, service, and repair roles; no construction workers; one employed in trade and commerce; one employed in transport, storage, and communications; and seven in other services.
