= Dandanpur =

- Village
- Map showing Dandanpur (#537) in Khiron CD block

- Location in Uttar Pradesh, India
- Coordinates: 26.360396°N 80.861069°E
- Country: India
- State: Uttar Pradesh
- District: Raebareli

Area
  - Total: 0.854 km^{2} (0.330 sq mi)

Population (2011)
  - Total: 537
  - Density: 629/km^{2} (1,630/sq mi)

Languages
  - Official: Hindi
- Time zone: UTC+5:30 (IST)
- Vehicle registration: UP-35

Dandanpur is a village in Khiron block of Rae Bareli district, Uttar Pradesh, India. It is located 20 km from Lalganj, the tehsil headquarters. As of 2011, it has a population of 537 people, in 109 households. It has 1 primary school and no healthcare facilities and it does not host a weekly haat or permanent market. It belongs to the nyaya panchayat of Atarhar.

The 1951 census recorded Dandanpur as comprising 1 hamlet, with a total population of 134 people (74 male and 60 female), in 25 households and 25 physical houses. The area of the village was given as 219 acres. 7 residents were literate, all male. The village was listed as belonging to the pargana of Khiron and the thana of Gurbakshganj.

The 1961 census recorded Dandanpur as comprising 1 hamlet, with a total population of 151 people (75 male and 76 female), in 28 households and 24 physical houses. The area of the village was given as 219 acres.

The 1981 census recorded Dandanpur (as "Dondanpur") as having a population of 264 people, in 41 households, and having an area of 88.63 hectares. The main staple foods were given as wheat and rice.
