= Manpur, Khiron =

Manpur Mānpur
- Village
- Map showing Manpur (#605) in Khiron CD block

- Location in Uttar Pradesh, India
- Coordinates: 26.229362°N 80.886737°E
- Country: India
- State: Uttar Pradesh
- District: Raebareli

Area
  - Total: 1.222 km^{2} (0.472 sq mi)

Population (2011)
  - Total: 1,188
  - Density: 972.2/km^{2} (2,518/sq mi)

Languages
  - Official: Hindi
- Time zone: UTC+5:30 (IST)
- Vehicle registration: UP-35

Manpur is a village in Khiron block of Rae Bareli district, Uttar Pradesh, India. It is located 13 km from Lalganj, the tehsil headquarters. As of 2011, it has a population of 1,188 people, in 192 households. It has 1 primary school and no healthcare facilities and it does not host a weekly haat or a permanent market. It belongs to the nyaya panchayat of Semari.

The 1951 census recorded Manpur as comprising 3 hamlets, with a total population of 531 people (254 male and 277 female), in 93 households and 81 physical houses. The area of the village was given as 313 acres. 117 residents were literate, all male. The village was listed as belonging to the pargana of Khiron and the thana of Sareni.

The 1961 census recorded Manpur as comprising 5 hamlets, with a total population of 612 people (291 male and 321 female), in 100 households and 76 physical houses. The area of the village was given as 313 acres.

The 1981 census recorded Manpur as having a population of 822 people, in 128 households, and having an area of 122.62 hectares. The main staple foods were given as wheat and rice.

The 1991 census recorded Manpur as having a total population of 952 people (472 male and 480 female), in 147 households and 145 physical houses. The area of the village was listed as 123 hectares. Members of the 0-6 age group numbered 153, or 16% of the total; this group was 45% male (69) and 55% female (84). Members of scheduled castes numbered 164, or 17% of the village's total population, while no members of scheduled tribes were recorded. The literacy rate of the village was 63% (357 men and 242 women). 301 people were classified as main workers (249 men and 52 women), while 0 people were classified as marginal workers; the remaining 651 residents were non-workers. The breakdown of main workers by employment category was as follows: 123 cultivators (i.e. people who owned or leased their own land); 66 agricultural labourers (i.e. people who worked someone else's land in return for payment); 5 workers in livestock, forestry, fishing, hunting, plantations, orchards, etc.; 0 in mining and quarrying; 0 household industry workers; 28 workers employed in other manufacturing, processing, service, and repair roles; 3 construction workers; 10 employed in trade and commerce; 9 employed in transport, storage, and communications; and 57 in other services.
