= Ketanpur =

- Village
- Map showing Ketanpur (#592) in Khiron CD block

- Location in Uttar Pradesh, India
- Coordinates: 26.263064°N 80.891105°E
- Country: India
- State: Uttar Pradesh
- District: Raebareli

Area
  - Total: 0.502 km^{2} (0.194 sq mi)

Population (2011)
  - Total: 345
  - Density: 687/km^{2} (1,780/sq mi)

Languages
  - Official: Hindi
- Time zone: UTC+5:30 (IST)
- Vehicle registration: UP-35

Ketanpur is a village in Khiron block of Rae Bareli district, Uttar Pradesh, India. It is located 14 km from Lalganj, the tehsil headquarters. As of 2011, it has a population of 345 people, in 66 households. It has 1 primary school and no healthcare facilities and does not host a weekly haat or a permanent market. It belongs to the nyaya panchayat of Deogaon.

The 1961 census recorded Ketanpur as comprising 1 hamlet, with a total population of 174 people (94 male and 80 female), in 28 households and 25 physical houses. The area of the village was given as 129 acres.

The 1981 census recorded Ketanpur as having a population of 285 people, in 49 households, and having an area of 52.20 hectares. The main staple foods were given as wheat and rice.

The 1991 census recorded Ketanpur as having a total population of 278 people (136 male and 142 female), in 47 households and 40 physical houses. The area of the village was listed as 53 hectares. Members of the 0-6 age group numbered 50, or 18% of the total; this group was 48% male (24) and 52% female (26). Members of scheduled castes made up 15% of the village's population, while no members of scheduled tribes were recorded. The literacy rate of the village was 28% (71 men and 8 women). 116 people were classified as main workers (66 men and 50 women), while 1 person was classified as a marginal worker (a woman); the remaining 161 residents were non-workers. The breakdown of main workers by employment category was as follows: 103 cultivators (i.e. people who owned or leased their own land); 2 agricultural labourers (i.e. people who worked someone else's land in return for payment); 0 workers in livestock, forestry, fishing, hunting, plantations, orchards, etc.; 0 in mining and quarrying; 0 household industry workers; 3 workers employed in other manufacturing, processing, service, and repair roles; 0 construction workers; 0 employed in trade and commerce; 1 employed in transport, storage, and communications; and 7 in other services.
