= Chak Gajraj =

Chak Gajraj Chak Gajrāj
- Village
- Map showing Chak Gajraj (#600) in Khiron CD block

- Location in Uttar Pradesh, India
- Coordinates: 26.261881°N 81.876687°E
- Country: India
- State: Uttar Pradesh
- District: Raebareli

Area
  - Total: 0.197 km^{2} (0.076 sq mi)

Population (2011)
  - Total: 429
  - Density: 2,180/km^{2} (5,640/sq mi)

Languages
  - Official: Hindi
- Time zone: UTC+5:30 (IST)
- Vehicle registration: UP-35

Chak Gajraj is a village in Khiron block of Rae Bareli district, Uttar Pradesh, India. It is located 11 kilometres (6.8 mi) from Lalganj, the tehsil headquarters. As of 2011, it has a population of 429 people, in 68 households. It has 1 primary school and no healthcare facilities and it does not host a weekly haat or a permanent market. It belongs to the nyaya panchayat of Semari.

The 1951 census recorded Chak Gajraj as comprising 2 hamlets, with a total population of 154 people (75 male and 79 female), in 70 households and 63 physical houses. The area of the village was given as 49 acres. 5 residents were literate, all male. The village was listed as belonging to the pargana of Khiron and the thana of Sareni.

The 1961 census recorded Chak Gajraj as comprising 2 hamlets, with a total population of 192 people (101 male and 91 female), in 38 households and 32 physical houses. The area of the village was given as 49 acres.

The 1981 census recorded Chak Gajraj as having a population of 240 people, in 39 households, and having an area of 19.82 hectares. The main staple foods were given as wheat and rice.

The 1991 census recorded Chak Gajraj as having a total population of 288 people (143 male and 145 female), in 48 households and 48 physical houses. The area of the village was listed as 20 hectares. Members of the 0-6 age group numbered 50, or 17% of the total; this group was 58% male (29) and 42% female (21). No members of scheduled castes or scheduled tribes were recorded. The literacy rate of the village was 41% (85 men and 33 women). 77 people were classified as main workers (all men), while 68 people were classified as marginal workers (all women); the remaining 143 residents were non-workers. The breakdown of main workers by employment category was as follows: 73 cultivators (i.e. people who owned or leased their own land); 1 agricultural labourer (i.e. people who worked someone else's land in return for payment); 0 workers in livestock, forestry, fishing, hunting, plantations, orchards, etc.; 0 in mining and quarrying; 0 household industry workers; 0 workers employed in other manufacturing, processing, service, and repair roles; 0 construction workers; 1 employed in trade and commerce; 0 employed in transport, storage, and communications; and 2 in other services.
