= Ramwapur Dubai =

Village in Uttar Pradesh, India

- Village
- Map showing Ramwapur Dubai (#598) in Khiron CD block

- Location in Uttar Pradesh, India
- Coordinates: 26.262534°N 80.887271°E
- Country: India
- State: Uttar Pradesh
- District: Raebareli

Area
  - Total: 3.861 km^{2} (1.491 sq mi)

Population (2011)
  - Total: 2,557
  - Density: 662.3/km^{2} (1,715/sq mi)

Languages
  - Official: Hindi
- Time zone: UTC+5:30 (IST)
- Vehicle registration: UP-33

Ramwapur Dubai is a village in Khiron block of Raebareli district, Uttar Pradesh, India. It is located 11 km from Lalganj, the tehsil headquarters. As of 2011, it had a population of 2,557 people, in 425 households. It has three primary schools and no healthcare facilities and it does not host a weekly haat or a permanent market. It belongs to the nyaya panchayat of Semari.

The 1951 census recorded Ramwapur Dubai as comprising 11 hamlets, with a total population of 836 people (420 male and 416 female), in 164 households and 145 physical houses. The area of the village was given as 994 acres. 80 residents were literate, 78 male and 2 female. The village was listed as belonging to the pargana of Khiron and the thana of Gurbakhshganj.

The 1961 census recorded Ramwapur Dubai as comprising 11 hamlets, with a total population of 968 people (485 male and 483 female), in 188 households and 159 physical houses. The area of the village was given as 994 acres.

The 1981 census recorded Ramwapur Dubai as having a population of 1,422 people, in 254 households, and having an area of 399.03 hectares. The main staple foods were given as wheat and rice.

The 1991 census recorded Ramwapur Dubai as having a total population of 1,524 people (768 male and 756 female), in 305 households and 305 physical houses. The area of the village was listed as 399 hectares. Members of the 0-6 age group numbered 273, or 18% of the total; this group was 55% male (150) and 45% female (123). Members of scheduled castes numbered 450, or 29.5% of the village's total population, while no members of scheduled tribes were recorded. The literacy rate of the village was 50% (657 men and 432 women). 502 people were classified as main workers (401 men and 101 women), while 182 people were classified as marginal workers (1 man and 181 women); the remaining 840 residents were non-workers. The breakdown of main workers by employment category was as follows: 421 cultivators (i.e. people who owned or leased their own land); 40 agricultural labourers (i.e. people who worked someone else's land in return for payment); 7 workers in livestock, forestry, fishing, hunting, plantations, orchards, etc.; 0 in mining and quarrying; 0 household industry workers; 7 workers employed in other manufacturing, processing, service, and repair roles; 0 construction workers; 7 employed in trade and commerce; 1 employed in transport, storage, and communications; and 19 in other services.

The temple Dhummeswar Mahadev mandir, constructed in 1938, is located in Ramwapur Dubai. Mr Vimal Trivedi has been the patron of this temple for last 20 years.

India's second largest expressway, Ganga Expressway, passes through this village.
