= Bakuliha =

- Village
- Map showing Bakuliha (#609) in Khiron CD block

- Location in Uttar Pradesh, India
- Coordinates: 26.234338°N 80.858193°E
- Country: India
- State: Uttar Pradesh
- District: Raebareli

Area
  - Total: 4.996 km^{2} (1.929 sq mi)

Population (2011)
  - Total: 4,244
  - Density: 849.5/km^{2} (2,200/sq mi)

Languages
  - Official: Hindi
- Time zone: UTC+5:30 (IST)
- Vehicle registration: UP-35

Bakuliha is a village in Khiron block of Rae Bareli district, Uttar Pradesh, India. It is located 16 km from Lalganj, the tehsil headquarters. As of 2011, it has a population of 4,244 people, in 768 households. It has 4 primary schools and no healthcare facilities and it does not host a weekly haat or a permanent market. It serves as the headquarters of a nyaya panchayat which also includes 7 other villages.

The 1951 census recorded Bakuliha as comprising 2 hamlets, with a total population of 1,241 people (654 male and 587 female), in 43 households and 41 physical houses. The area of the village was given as 103 acres. 115 residents were literate, 109 male and 6 female. The village was listed as belonging to the pargana of Khiron and the thana of Dalmau.

The 1961 census recorded Bakuliha as comprising 6 hamlets, with a total population of 1,574 people (809 male and 765 female), in 265 households and 246 physical houses. The area of the village was given as 1,226 acres.

The 1981 census recorded Bakuliha as having a population of 2,126 people, in 399 households, and having an area of 506.76 hectares. The main staple foods were given as wheat and rice.

The 1991 census recorded Bakuliha as having a total population of 2,670 people (1,425 male and 1,245 female), in 495 households and 480 physical houses. The area of the village was listed as 500 hectares. Members of the 0-6 age group numbered 434, or 16% of the total; this group was 53% male (228) and 47% female (206). Members of scheduled castes numbered 628, or 23.5% of the village's total population, while no members of scheduled tribes were recorded. The literacy rate of the village was 43% (831 men and 321 women). 667 people were classified as main workers (645 men and 22 women), while 52 people were classified as marginal workers (17 men and 35 women); the remaining 1,951 residents were non-workers. The breakdown of main workers by employment category was as follows: 377 cultivators (i.e. people who owned or leased their own land); 50 agricultural labourers (i.e. people who worked someone else's land in return for payment); 1 worker in livestock, forestry, fishing, hunting, plantations, orchards, etc.; 22 household industry workers; 56 workers employed in other manufacturing, processing, service, and repair roles; 10 construction workers; 44 employed in trade and commerce; 13 employed in transport, storage, and communications; and 94 in other services.
