= Khiron =

Khiron Khīron
- Village
- Map of Khiron CD block

- Location in Uttar Pradesh, India
- Coordinates: 26.2871°N 80.9239°E
- Country: India
- State: Uttar Pradesh
- District: Raebareli

Area
  - Total: 7.717 km^{2} (2.980 sq mi)

Population (2011)
  - Total: 1,555
  - Density: 201.5/km^{2} (521.9/sq mi)

Languages
  - Official: Hindi
- Time zone: UTC+5:30 (IST)
- PIN: 229295
- Vehicle registration: UP-33

Khiron is a village and corresponding community development block in Rae Bareli district, Uttar Pradesh, India. Located on the main Raebareli-Unnao road, semari Khiron is an old Muslim town that historically served as the seat of a pargana. As of 2011, the village has a population of 9,955, in 1,714 households. It has six primary schools and one medical clinic. It serves as the headquarters of a nyaya panchayat that also includes 11 other villages.

Khiron hosts an annual mela at the Balbhadreshwar Mahadeo temple on Phalguna Badi 13; the festival is part of Shivratri and is dedicated to the worship of Shiva. Vendors bring various everyday items to sell at the fair. Khiron also hosts markets twice per week, on Mondays and Thursdays; the main items traded are cloth and vegetables.

== History ==
Khiron was fortified and made the seat of a pargana during the reign of Asaf-ud-Daula; the headquarters had previously been at Satanpur since its foundation and fortification by the Bais raja Sathna. Khiron was also historically the seat of a taluqdari estate belonging to a Janwar dynasty, and there were also several Kayasth qanungo families, including many descended from Rai Sahib Rai, who had been a chakladar under the Nawabs of Awadh. Rai Sahib Rai had built a fort at Khiron whose ruins still exist. There is also the tomb of Fateh Shahid, a companion of the Muslim folk hero Sayyid Salar Masud.

The population of Khiron declined sharply in the late 1800s from 3,408 in 1869 to 2,669 in 1901. At the 1901 census, there were 559 Muslims, almost entirely Pathans. Turn-of-the-century Khiron had a large primary school, a cattle pound, a branch post office, and two bazars called Balbhaddarganj and Raghunathganj, holding markets twice per week. There was a large tank to the north and east of the town, as well as some kankar quarries and plenty of orchards.

The 1951 census recorded Khiron as comprising 10 hamlets, with a total population of 2,939 people (1,474 male and 1,465 female), in 593 households and 593 physical houses. The area of the village was given as 1,925 acres (779 ha)s. 338 residents were literate, 295 male and 43 female. The village was listed as belonging to the pargana of Khiron and the thana of Gurbakshganj.

The 1961 census recorded Khiron as comprising 10 hamlets, with a total population of 3,210 people (1,679 male and 1,531 female), in 590 households and 536 physical houses. The area of the village was given as 1,925 acres (779 ha)s and it had a post office at that point. There was a dispensary run by a local body with five male beds and one female bed; It had one grain mill, and four small manufacturers of clothing. Average attendance of market was 500 and for the festival it was 400.

The 1981 census recorded Khiron as having a population of 5,243 people, in 946 households, and having an area of 973.76 hectares (2,406.2 acres). The main staple foods were listed as wheat and rice.

The 1991 census recorded Khiron as having a total population of 6,296 people (3,317 male and 2,979 female), in 1,127 households and 1,124 physical houses. The area of the village was listed as 57 hectares (140 acres). Members of the 0-6 age group numbered 1,262, or 20% of the total; this group was 52% male (658) and 48% female (604). Members of scheduled castes numbered 2,029, or 32% of the village's total population, while no members of scheduled tribes were recorded. The literacy rate of the village was 35% (1,581 men and 642 women). 1,757 people were classified as main workers (1,613 men and 144 women), while 213 people were classified as marginal workers (all women); the remaining 4,326 residents were non-workers. The breakdown of main workers by employment category was as follows: 828 cultivators (i.e. people who owned or leased their own land); 290 agricultural labourers (i.e. people who worked someone else's land in return for payment); 27 workers in livestock, forestry, fishing, hunting, plantations, orchards, etc.; 0 in mining and quarrying; 42 household industry workers; 66 workers employed in other manufacturing, processing, service, and repair roles; 12 construction workers; 200 employed in trade and commerce; 34 employed in transport, storage, and communications; and 258 in other services.

== Villages ==
Khiron CD block has the following 94 villages:

Village name	Total land area (hectares)	Population (in 2011)
Aindhi	377.1	2,317
Dandanpur	85.4	537
Mustaqim Ganj	117.8	500
Shiv Puri	217.2	1,354
Jeti	484	2,108
Chandauli	234.5	1,286
Gona Mau	161.9	1,247
Behta Satanpur	227.5	1,408
Tarwa Barwa	82.2	598
Dondepur	117.8	1,251
Atarhar	350.6	3,296
Dumarher	326.8	2,577
Nandehari	106.8	705
Dhurayee	594.2	4,481
Paho	866	5,620
Lodipur	149.4	834
Mohanpur	28.3	425
Sadullapur	90.8	796
Ranapur Urf Pahrauli	350.6	2,158
Khajuha	180.6	1,260
Kursandi	113.2	1,166
Lalpur	97.4	546
Hardi	164.9	1,675
Baraundi	201.3	1,556
Haripur Mirdaha	193.6	2,284
Madanapur	113.2	1,031
Saguni	162.8	1,941
Baraula	197.1	1,305
Paraspur	24.4	37
Khiron (block headquarters)	771.7	9,955
Husenabad	59.6	862
Rampur Majra	139.4	447
Bhitargaon	1,318.1	10,841
Basigawan	222.2	747
Nau Gawn	123.1	450
Chande Mau	171.9	1,135
Mera Mau	92.5	1,057
Jasaumau	363.9	2,917
Mendauli	468.3	3,345
Hari Ramkhera	46.2	290
Akohriya	177	1,481
Dokanaha	534.1	4,009
Nunera	175.6	1,717
Sehara Mau	102.1	840
Jam Koriyapur	169	881
Kamalpur	184.8	1,118
Akhaupur	181.1	1,338
Dahirapur	52.6	386
Barvaliya	159	1,459
Tikwa Mau	156.1	1,065
Khanpur Khunti	178.4	1,723
Mirjapur	122.2	648
Sarai Mahmood	62.2	460
Udwatpur	138.4	847
Kishun Khera	155.4	1,205
Majhigawan	102.7	782
Deo Gaon	143.6	1,233
Ketanpur	50.2	345
Kalupur	61.5	470
Mishra Khera	61.1	354
Khandepur	91.7	647
Sewanpur	356.7	1,894
Surajpur Guman Khera	124.5	1,206
Ramwapur Dubai	386.1	2,537
Baswan Khera	32.4	725
Chak Gajraj	19.7	429
Chakpher Shah	37.2	491
Semari	626	5,715
Lakshipur	398.2	2,524
Dewali	99.3	517
Manpur	122.2	1,188
Keshauli	201.7	1,742
Khargapur	195.8	2,246
Bhitari	315.4	3,221
Bakuliha	499.6	4,244
Sidhaur Semari	129.2	1,169
Afasari	99.4	731
Bijemau Khapura	290.7	2,799
Kanha Mau	272	886
Malpur	143.3	592
Shyampur	197.2	593
Haripur Nihastha	123.7	722
Nihastha	446.5	2,597
Rampur Nihastha	110.8	508
Jagatpur Ramgari	258	1,168
Chikhari	273.4	555
Satanpur	330.1	3,902
Banai Mau	126.8	856
Ajitpur	106.4	1,264
Raipur	166.9	1,283
Ekauni	168.6	1,466
Gaunha	269.9	993
Korara	57	258
Bari	180.2	779
Merui	506.1	2,855
