= Hardi =

Hardi may refer to:

- French ship Hardi (1750)
- HMS Hardi (1797)
- Hardi, Raebareli, a village in Uttar Pradesh, India
- Hardi Union, a union parishad of Bangladesh

== People ==
Given name

- Hardi (politician) (1918–1998), Indonesian former Deputy Prime Minister and Ambassador to Vietnam
- Hardi (artist) (1951–2023), Indonesian artist
- Hardi Bujang (born 1984), Bruneian footballer and coach
- Hardi Jaafar (born 1979), Malaysian footballer
- Hardi Tiidus (1918–1999), Estonian television presenter, editor, journalist and translator
- Mohammed Hardi Tufeiru (born 1969), Ghanaian politician
- Hardi Volmer (born 1957), Estonian film director, puppet theatre set decorator and musician

Surname

- Marlia Hardi (1926–1984), Indonesian actress
- Mohamed Hardi (1943–1996), Algerian minister for the interior
- Ramona Härdi (born 1997), Swiss speed-skater
