= Baraundi =

- Village
- Map showing Baraundi (#558) in Khiron CD block

- Location in Uttar Pradesh, India
- Coordinates: 26.301696°N 80.900317°E
- Country India: India
- State: Uttar Pradesh
- District: Raebareli

Area
  - Total: 2.013 km^{2} (0.777 sq mi)

Population (2011)
  - Total: 1,556
  - Density: 773.0/km^{2} (2,002/sq mi)

Languages
  - Official: Hindi
- Time zone: UTC+5:30 (IST)
- Vehicle registration: UP-35

Baraundi is a village in Khiron block of Rae Bareli district, Uttar Pradesh, India. It is located 23 km from Lalganj, the tehsil headquarters. As of 2011, it has a population of 1,556 people, in 270 households. It has one primary school and no healthcare facilities.

The 1961 census recorded Baraundi as comprising 4 hamlets, with a total population of 578 people (314 male and 264 female), in 103 households and 88 physical houses. The area of the village was given as 515 acres.

The 1981 census recorded Baraundi as having a population of 798 people, in 136 households, and having an area of 207.20 hectares. The main staple foods were given as wheat and rice.

== Archaeology ==
During an archaeological survey of Raebareli district in the late 1990s, archaeologists D. P. Tewari and Anoop Kumar Singh encountered various redware and brickbats at Baraundi, which they dated tentatively to the medieval period.
