= Jasaumau =

- Village
- Map showing Jasaumau (#572) in Khiron CD block

- Location in Uttar Pradesh, India
- Coordinates: 26.275128°N 80.988488°E
- Country India: India
- State: Uttar Pradesh
- District: Raebareli

Area
  - Total: 3.639 km^{2} (1.405 sq mi)

Population (2011)
  - Total: 2,917
  - Density: 801.6/km^{2} (2,076/sq mi)

Languages
  - Official: Hindi
- Time zone: UTC+5:30 (IST)
- Vehicle registration: UP-35

Jasaumau is a village in Khiron block of Rae Bareli district, Uttar Pradesh, India. It is located 18 km from Lalganj, the tehsil headquarters. As of 2011, it has a population of 2,917 people, in 569 households. It has one primary school and no healthcare facilities.

The 1961 census recorded Jasaumau as comprising 4 hamlets, with a total population of 1,127 people (578 male and 549 female), in 216 households and 188 physical houses. The area of the village was given as 872 acres.

The 1981 census recorded Jasaumau as having a population of 1,651 people, in 307 households, and having an area of 404.28 hectares. The main staple foods were given as wheat and rice.
