= Raipur, Khiron =

Raipur Rāipur
- Village
- Map showing Lalpur (#624) in Khiron CD block

- Location in Uttar Pradesh, India
- Coordinates: 26.236408°N 80.966731°E
- Country India: India
- State: Uttar Pradesh
- District: Raebareli

Area
  - Total: 1.669 km^{2} (0.644 sq mi)

Population (2011)
  - Total: 1,283
  - Density: 768.7/km^{2} (1,991/sq mi)

Languages
  - Official: Hindi
- Time zone: UTC+5:30 (IST)
- Vehicle registration: UP-35

Raipur is a village in Khiron block of Rae Bareli district, Uttar Pradesh, India. It is located 5 km from Lalganj, the tehsil headquarters. As of 2011, it has a population of 1,283 people, in 241 households. It has one primary school and no healthcare facilities.

The 1961 census recorded Raipur as comprising 4 hamlets, with a total population of 733 people (351 male and 382 female), in 118 households and 107 physical houses. The area of the village was given as 409 acres and it had a post office at that point.

The 1981 census recorded Raipur as having a population of 958 people, in 227 households, and having an area of 166.73 hectares. The main staple foods were given as wheat and rice.
