= Dondepur =

- Village
- Map showing Dondepur (#544) in Khiron CD block

- Location in Uttar Pradesh, India
- Coordinates: 26.327807°N 80.868522°E
- Country India: India
- State: Uttar Pradesh
- District: Raebareli

Area
  - Total: 1.178 km^{2} (0.455 sq mi)

Population (2011)
  - Total: 1,251
  - Density: 1,062/km^{2} (2,750/sq mi)

Languages
  - Official: Hindi
- Time zone: UTC+5:30 (IST)
- Vehicle registration: UP-35

Dondepur is a village in Khiron block of Rae Bareli district, Uttar Pradesh, India. It is located 22 km from Lalganj, the tehsil headquarters. As of 2011, it has a population of 1,251 people, in 253 households. It has one primary school and no healthcare facilities.

The 1961 census recorded Dondepur as comprising 3 hamlets, with a total population of 649 people (334 male and 315 female), in 122 households and 116 physical houses. The area of the village was given as 295 acres.

The 1981 census recorded Dondepur (as "Dondeypur") as having a population of 854 people, in 153 households, and having an area of 121.00 hectares. The main staple foods were given as wheat and rice.
