= Ajitpur =

- Village
- Map showing Ajitpur (#623) in Khiron CD block

- Location in Uttar Pradesh, India
- Coordinates: 26.246858°N 80.96482°E
- Country India: India
- State: Uttar Pradesh
- District: Raebareli

Area
  - Total: 1.064 km^{2} (0.411 sq mi)

Population (2011)
  - Total: 1,264
  - Density: 1,188/km^{2} (3,077/sq mi)

Languages
  - Official: Hindi
- Time zone: UTC+5:30 (IST)
- Vehicle registration: UP-35

Ajitpur is a village in Khiron block of Rae Bareli district, Uttar Pradesh, India. It is located 5 km from Lalganj, the tehsil headquarters. As of 2011, it has a population of 1,264 people, in 261 households. It has two primary schools and no healthcare facilities.

The 1961 census recorded Ajitpur as comprising 1 hamlet, with a total population of 760 people (343 male and 417 female), in 142 households and 128 physical houses. The area of the village was given as 268 acres.

The 1981 census recorded Ajitpur as having a population of 997 people, in 194 households, and having an area of 104.81 hectares. The main staple foods were given as wheat and rice.
