= Bhitargaon, Raebareli =

Bhitargaon Bhītargāon
- Village
- Map showing Bhitargaon (#567) in Khiron CD block

- Location in Uttar Pradesh, India
- Coordinates: 26.298087°N 80.972506°E
- Country India: India
- State: Uttar Pradesh
- District: Raebareli

Area
  - Total: 13.181 km^{2} (5.089 sq mi)

Population (2011)
  - Total: 10,841
  - Density: 822.47/km^{2} (2,130.2/sq mi)

Languages
  - Official: Hindi
- Time zone: UTC+5:30 (IST)
- Vehicle registration: UP-35

Bhitargaon is a village in Khiron block of Rae Bareli district, Uttar Pradesh, India. Located some 14 km from Lalganj, the tehsil headquarters, Bhitargaon consists of several hamlets clustered together by the main Raebareli-Unnao road. As of 2011, it has a population of 10,841 people, in 1,976 households. The village has a temple to Anandi Devi. A mela called the Anandi-ka-Mela is also held in her honour annually on Chaitra Badi 8 and Jyaistha Sudi 2. The Anandiganj bazar in Bhitargaon hosts markets twice weekly, on Tuesdays and Fridays. The main trade is in cloth and vegetables.

== History ==
The 1901 census recorded Bhitargaon's population as 4,198 people, including a Muslim minority of 517. The village was then divided into 10 mahals; 4 of them were held by Janwar zamindars and the rest were held in either imperfect pattidari or joint zamindari tenure by Brahmin, Kayasth, or Janwar landowners.

The 1961 census recorded Bhitargaon as comprising 12 hamlets, with a total population of 4,715 people (2,419 male and 2,296 female), in 944 households and 864 physical houses. The area of the village was given as 3,231 acres and it had a post office and a grain mill at that point. Average attendance of the Anandi-ka-Mela was about 300 and attendance of the twice-weekly market was around 400.

The 1981 census recorded Bhitargaon as having a population of 6,407 people, in 1,224 households, and having an area of 1,307.56 hectares. The main staple foods were given as wheat and rice.

== Archaeology ==
During an archaeological survey of Raebareli district in the late 1990s, archaeologists D. P. Tewari and Anoop Kumar Singh found redware and brickbats at Bhitargaon, which they dated tentatively to the Gupta to early medieval period.
