= Kursandi =

- Village
- Map showing Kursandi (#555) in Khiron CD block

- Location in Uttar Pradesh, India
- Coordinates: 26.299514°N 80.886648°E
- Country India: India
- State: Uttar Pradesh
- District: Raebareli

Area
  - Total: 1.132 km^{2} (0.437 sq mi)

Population (2011)
  - Total: 1,166
  - Density: 1,030/km^{2} (2,668/sq mi)

Languages
  - Official: Hindi
- Time zone: UTC+5:30 (IST)
- Vehicle registration: UP-35

Kursandi is a village in Khiron block of Rae Bareli district, Uttar Pradesh, India. It is located 20 km from Lalganj, the tehsil headquarters. As of 2011, it has a population of 1,166 people, in 209 households. It has one primary school and no healthcare facilities.

The 1961 census recorded Kursandi as comprising 2 hamlets, with a total population of 660 people (328 male and 332 female), in 120 households and 115 physical houses. The area of the village was given as 280 acres.

The 1981 census recorded Kursandi as having a population of 796 people, in 150 households, and having an area of 113.32 hectares. The main staple foods were given as wheat and rice.
