= Baraula, Raebareli =

Baraula
- Village
- Map showing Baraula (#562) in Khiron CD block

- Location in Uttar Pradesh, India
- Coordinates: 26.295953°N 80.936271°E
- Country India: India
- State: Uttar Pradesh
- District: Raebareli

Area
  - Total: 2.013 km^{2} (0.777 sq mi)

Population (2011)
  - Total: 1,556
  - Density: 773.0/km^{2} (2,002/sq mi)

Languages
  - Official: Hindi
- Time zone: UTC+5:30 (IST)
- Vehicle registration: UP-35

Baraula is a village in Khiron block of Rae Bareli district, Uttar Pradesh, India. It is located 10 km from Lalganj, the tehsil headquarters. As of 2011, it has a population of 1,556 people, in 272 households. It has one primary school and no healthcare facilities.

The 1961 census recorded Baraula as comprising 2 hamlets, with a total population of 480 people (244 male and 236 female), in 99 households and 94 physical houses. The area of the village was given as 484 acres.

The 1981 census recorded Baraula as having a population of 738 people, in 150 households, and having an area of 197.49 hectares. The main staple foods were given as wheat and rice.
