= Mendauli =

- Village
- Map showing Mendauli (#573) in Khiron CD block

- Location in Uttar Pradesh, India
- Coordinates: 26.2824°N 80.958179°E
- Country India: India
- State: Uttar Pradesh
- District: Raebareli

Area
  - Total: 4.683 km^{2} (1.808 sq mi)

Population (2011)
  - Total: 3,345
  - Density: 714.3/km^{2} (1,850/sq mi)

Languages
  - Official: Hindi
- Time zone: UTC+5:30 (IST)
- Vehicle registration: UP-35

Mendauli is a village in Khiron block of Rae Bareli district, Uttar Pradesh, India. It is located 19 km from Lalganj, the tehsil headquarters. As of 2011, it has a population of 3,345 people, in 649 households. It has two primary schools and no healthcare facilities.

The 1961 census recorded Mendauli (as "Mendauli") as comprising 5 hamlets, with a total population of 1,138 people (563 male and 575 female), in 224 households and 203 physical houses. The area of the village was given as 1,153 acres.

The 1981 census recorded Mendauli (as "Medauli") as having a population of 1,071 people, in 309 households, and having an area of 468.22 hectares. The main staple foods were given as wheat and rice.
