= Behta Satanpur =

- Village
- Map showing Behta Satanpur (#542) in Khiron CD block

- Location in Uttar Pradesh, India
- Coordinates: 26.338989°N 80.853625°E
- Country India: India
- State: Uttar Pradesh
- District: Raebareli

Area
  - Total: 2.275 km^{2} (0.878 sq mi)

Population (2011)
  - Total: 1,408
  - Density: 618.9/km^{2} (1,603/sq mi)

Languages
  - Official: Hindi
- Time zone: UTC+5:30 (IST)
- Vehicle registration: UP-35

Behta Satanpur is a village in Khiron block of Rae Bareli district, Uttar Pradesh, India. It is located 20 km from Lalganj, the tehsil headquarters. As of 2011, it has a population of 1,408 people, in 243 households. It has one primary school and no healthcare facilities.

The 1961 census recorded Behta Satanpur as comprising 1 hamlet, with a total population of 582 people (298 male and 284 female), in 121 households and 102 physical houses. The area of the village was given as 576 acres.

The 1981 census recorded Behta Satanpur as having a population of 874 people, in 169 households, and having an area of 229.45 hectares. The main staple foods were given as wheat and rice.
