= Gonamau =

Gonamau Gonāmau
- Village
- Map showing Gonamau (#541) in Khiron CD block

- Location in Uttar Pradesh, India
- Coordinates: 26.342393°N 80.837308°E
- Country India: India
- State: Uttar Pradesh
- District: Raebareli

Area
  - Total: 1.619 km^{2} (0.625 sq mi)

Population (2011)
  - Total: 1,247
  - Density: 770.2/km^{2} (1,995/sq mi)

Languages
  - Official: Hindi
- Time zone: UTC+5:30 (IST)
- Vehicle registration: UP-35

Gonamau is a village in Khiron block of Rae Bareli district, Uttar Pradesh, India. It is located 18 km from Lalganj, the tehsil headquarters. As of 2011, it has a population of 1,247 people, in 228 households. It has one primary school and no healthcare facilities.

The 1961 census recorded Gonamau (as "Gaunamau") as comprising 1 hamlet, with a total population of 584 people (304 male and 280 female), in 110 households and 98 physical houses. The area of the village was given as 426 acres.

The 1981 census recorded Gonamau as having a population of 789 people, in 136 households, and having an area of 174.82 hectares. The main staple foods were given as wheat and rice.
