= Gaunha =

- Village
- Map showing Gaunha (#626) in Khiron CD block

- Location in Uttar Pradesh, India
- Coordinates: 26.235571°N 80.981975°E
- Country India: India
- State: Uttar Pradesh
- District: Raebareli

Area
  - Total: 2.699 km^{2} (1.042 sq mi)

Population (2011)
  - Total: 993
  - Density: 368/km^{2} (953/sq mi)

Languages
  - Official: Hindi
- Time zone: UTC+5:30 (IST)
- Vehicle registration: UP-35

Gaunha is a village in Khiron block of Rae Bareli district, Uttar Pradesh, India. It is located 5 km from Lalganj, the tehsil headquarters. As of 2011, it had a population of 993 people, in 205 households. It has one primary school and one medical dispensary.

The 1961 census recorded Gaunha (as "Gaunaha") as comprising 1 hamlet, with a total population of 642 people (311 male and 331 female), in 126 households and 119 physical houses. The area of the village was given as 711 acres.

The 1981 census recorded Gaunha (as "Gaunaha") as having a population of 781 people, in 154 households, and having an area of 280.14 hectares. The main staple foods were given as wheat and rice.
