= Aindhi =

- Village
- Map showing Aindhi (#144536) in Khiron CD block

- Location in Uttar Pradesh, India
- Coordinates: 26.357458°N 80.851095°E
- Country India: India
- State: Uttar Pradesh
- District: Raebareli

Area
  - Total: 3.771 km^{2} (1.456 sq mi)

Population (2011)
  - Total: 2,317
  - Density: 614.4/km^{2} (1,591/sq mi)

Languages
  - Official: Hindi
- Time zone: UTC+5:30 (IST)
- Vehicle registration: UP-35

Aindhi is a village in Khiron block of Rae Bareli district, Uttar Pradesh, India. It is located 20 km from Lalganj, the tehsil headquarters. As of 2011, it has a population of 2,317 people, in 492 households. It has one primary school and no healthcare facilities.

The 1961 census recorded Aindhi as comprising 4 hamlets, with a total population of 1,086 people (565 male and 521 female), in 212 households and 173 physical houses. The area of the village was given as 989 acres.

The 1981 census recorded Aindhi (as "Andhi") as having a population of 1,545 people, in 285 households, and having an area of 384.45 hectares. The main staple foods were given as wheat and rice.
