= Tarwa Barwa =

- Village
- Map showing Tarwa Barwa (#543) in Khiron CD block

- Location in Uttar Pradesh, India
- Coordinates: 26.336605°N 80.862053°E
- Country India: India
- State: Uttar Pradesh
- District: Raebareli

Area
  - Total: 0.822 km^{2} (0.317 sq mi)

Population (2011)
  - Total: 598
  - Density: 727/km^{2} (1,880/sq mi)

Languages
  - Official: Hindi
- Time zone: UTC+5:30 (IST)
- Vehicle registration: UP-35

Tarwa Barwa is a village in Khiron block of Rae Bareli district, Uttar Pradesh, India. It is located 19 km from Lalganj, the tehsil headquarters. As of 2011, it has a population of 598 people, in 117 households. It has one primary school and no healthcare facilities.

The 1961 census recorded Tarwa Barwa as comprising 2 hamlets, with a total population of 207 people (95 male and 112 female), in 42 households and 38 physical houses. The area of the village was given as 202 acres.

The 1981 census recorded Tarwa Barwa as having a population of 326 people, in 65 households, and having an area of 84.18 hectares. The main staple foods were given as wheat and rice.
