= Ekauni =

- Village
- Map showing Ekauni (#625) in Khiron CD block

- Location in Uttar Pradesh, India
- Coordinates: 26.235378°N 80.973377°E
- Country India: India
- State: Uttar Pradesh
- District: Raebareli

Area
  - Total: 1.686 km^{2} (0.651 sq mi)

Population (2011)
  - Total: 1,466
  - Density: 869.5/km^{2} (2,252/sq mi)

Languages
  - Official: Hindi
- Time zone: UTC+5:30 (IST)
- Vehicle registration: UP-35

Ekauni is a village in Khiron block of Rae Bareli district, Uttar Pradesh, India. It is located 5 km from Lalganj, the tehsil headquarters. As of 2011, it has a population of 1,466 people, in 256 households. It has one primary school and one medical clinic.

The 1961 census recorded Ekauni as comprising 3 hamlets, with a total population of 666 people (326 male and 340 female), in 128 households and 112 physical houses. The area of the village was given as 406 acres.

The 1981 census recorded Ekauni as having a population of 884 people, in 178 households, and having an area of 170.58 hectares. The main staple foods were given as wheat and rice.
