= Lodipur, Khiron =

Lodipur
- Village
- Map showing Lodipur (#550) in Khiron CD block

- Location in Uttar Pradesh, India
- Coordinates: 26.325335°N 80.896662°E
- Country India: India
- State: Uttar Pradesh
- District: Raebareli

Area
  - Total: 1.494 km^{2} (0.577 sq mi)

Population (2011)
  - Total: 834
  - Density: 558/km^{2} (1,450/sq mi)

Languages
  - Official: Hindi
- Time zone: UTC+5:30 (IST)
- Vehicle registration: UP-35

Lodipur is a village in Khiron block of Rae Bareli district, Uttar Pradesh, India. It is located 20 km from Lalganj, the tehsil headquarters. As of 2011, it has a population of 834 people, in 156 households. It has one primary school and no healthcare facilities.

The 1961 census recorded Lodipur as comprising 4 hamlets, with a total population of 368 people (177 male and 191 female), in 71 households and 62 physical houses. The area of the village was given as 366 acres.

The 1981 census recorded Lodipur as having a population of 492 people, in 84 households, and having an area of 149.33 hectares. The main staple foods were given as wheat and rice.
