= Sarai Mahmud =

Sarai Mahmud Sarāi Mahmūd
- Village
- Map showing Sarai Mahmud (#587) in Khiron CD block

- Location in Uttar Pradesh, India
- Coordinates: 26.276359°N 80.909401°E
- Country India: India
- State: Uttar Pradesh
- District: Raebareli

Area
  - Total: 0.622 km^{2} (0.240 sq mi)

Population (2011)
  - Total: 460
  - Density: 740/km^{2} (1,900/sq mi)

Languages
  - Official: Hindi
- Time zone: UTC+5:30 (IST)
- Vehicle registration: UP-35

Sarai Mahmud is a village in Khiron block of Rae Bareli district, Uttar Pradesh, India. It is located 17 km from Lalganj, the tehsil headquarters. As of 2011, it has a population of 460 people, in 72 households. It has no schools and no healthcare facilities.

The 1961 census recorded Sarai Mahmud (as "Sarai Mahmood") as comprising 2 hamlets, with a total population of 197 people (100 male and 97 female), in 35 households and 28 physical houses. The area of the village was given as 154 acres.

The 1981 census recorded Sarai Mahmud (as "Sarai Mahmood") as having a population of 877 people, in 47 households, and having an area of 62.72 hectares. The main staple foods were given as wheat and rice.
