= Lalpur, Khiron =

Lalpur Lālpur
- Village
- Map showing Lalpur (#556) in Khiron CD block

- Location in Uttar Pradesh, India
- Coordinates: 26.305236°N 80.88842°E
- Country India: India
- State: Uttar Pradesh
- District: Raebareli

Area
  - Total: 0.974 km^{2} (0.376 sq mi)

Population (2011)
  - Total: 546
  - Density: 561/km^{2} (1,450/sq mi)

Languages
  - Official: Hindi
- Time zone: UTC+5:30 (IST)
- Vehicle registration: UP-35

Lalpur is a village in Khiron block of Rae Bareli district, Uttar Pradesh, India. It is located 21 km from Lalganj, the tehsil headquarters. As of 2011, it has a population of 546 people, in 109 households. It has one primary school and no healthcare facilities.

The 1961 census recorded Lalpur as comprising 2 hamlets, with a total population of 264 people (118 male and 146 female), in 45 households and 44 physical houses. The area of the village was given as 239 acres.

The 1981 census recorded Lalpur as having a population of 366 people, in 67 households, and having an area of 97.94 hectares. The main staple foods were given as wheat and rice.
