= Malpur, Khiron =

Malpur Mālpur
- Village
- Map showing Malpur (#614) in Khiron CD block

- Location in Uttar Pradesh, India
- Coordinates: 26.200217°N 80.851064°E
- Country India: India
- State: Uttar Pradesh
- District: Raebareli

Area
  - Total: 1.433 km^{2} (0.553 sq mi)

Population (2011)
  - Total: 592
  - Density: 413/km^{2} (1,070/sq mi)

Languages
  - Official: Hindi
- Time zone: UTC+5:30 (IST)
- Vehicle registration: UP-35

Malpur is a village in Khiron block of Rae Bareli district, Uttar Pradesh, India. It is located 14 km from Lalganj, the tehsil headquarters. As of 2011, it has a population of 592 people, in 108 households. It has one primary school and no healthcare facilities.

The 1961 census recorded Malpur as comprising 3 hamlets, with a total population of 369 people (173 male and 196 female), in 61 households and 49 physical houses. The area of the village was given as 359 acres.

The 1981 census recorded Malpur as having a population of 418 people, in 84 households, and having an area of 145.28 hectares. The main staple foods were given as wheat and rice.
