= Bari, Raebareli =

Bari
- Village
- Map showing Bari (#628) in Khiron CD block

- Location in Uttar Pradesh, India
- Coordinates: 26.226486°N 80.961225°E
- Country India: India
- State: Uttar Pradesh
- District: Raebareli

Area
  - Total: 1.802 km^{2} (0.696 sq mi)

Population (2011)
  - Total: 779
  - Density: 432/km^{2} (1,120/sq mi)

Languages
  - Official: Hindi
- Time zone: UTC+5:30 (IST)
- Vehicle registration: UP-35

Bari is a village in Khiron block of Rae Bareli district, Uttar Pradesh, India. It is located 4 km from Lalganj, the tehsil headquarters. As of 2011, it has a population of 779 people, in 143 households. It has one primary school and no healthcare facilities.

The 1961 census recorded Bari as comprising 2 hamlets, with a total population of 361 people (191 male and 170 female), in 72 households and 51 physical houses. The area of the village was given as 444 acres.

The 1981 census recorded Bari as having a population of 522 people, in 84 households, and having an area of 181.22 hectares. The main staple foods were given as wheat and rice.
