= Deogaon, Khiron =

Deogaon Deogāon
- Village
- Map showing Deogaon (#591) in Khiron CD block

- Location in Uttar Pradesh, India
- Coordinates: 26.255376°N 80.903342°E
- Country: India
- State: Uttar Pradesh
- District: Raebareli

Area
  - Total: 1.436 km^{2} (0.554 sq mi)

Population (2011)
  - Total: 1,233
  - Density: 858.6/km^{2} (2,224/sq mi)

Languages
  - Official: Hindi
- Time zone: UTC+5:30 (IST)
- Vehicle registration: UP-35

Deogaon is a village in Khiron block of Rae Bareli district, Uttar Pradesh, India.

== Location ==
Deogaon is located 12 km from Lalganj, the tehsil headquarters.

== Demographics ==
As of 2011, Deogaon has a population of 1,233 people, in 212 households. It has 1 primary school and a primary health centre and does not host a weekly haat or a permanent market. It serves as the headquarters of a nyaya panchayat which also includes 12 other villages.

The 1951 census recorded Deogaon as comprising 2 hamlets, with a total population of 473 people (239 male and 234 female), in 104 households and 91 physical houses. The area of the village was given as 1,036 acres. 78 residents were literate, all male. The village was listed as belonging to the pargana of Khiron and the thana of Gurbakshganj.

The 1961 census recorded Deogaon as comprising 2 hamlets, with a total population of 538 people (279 male and 259 female), in 100 households and 96 physical houses. The area of the village was given as 355 acres.

The 1981 census recorded Deogaon as having a population of 795 people, in 135 households, and having an area of 143.66 hectares. The main staple foods were given as wheat and rice.

The 1991 census recorded Deogaon (as "Deo Gaon") as having a total population of 958 people (494 male and 464 female), in 166 households and 166 physical houses. The area of the village was listed as 144 hectares.

Members of the 0-6 age group numbered 182, or 19% of the total; this group was 55% male (101) and 45% female (81). Members of scheduled castes made up 27% of the village's population, while no members of scheduled tribes were recorded. The literacy rate of the village was 28% (220 men and 45 women). 210 people were classified as main workers (206 men and 4 women), while 103 people were classified as marginal workers (all women); the remaining 645 residents were non-workers. The breakdown of main workers by employment category was as follows: 104 cultivators (i.e. people who owned or leased their own land); 25 agricultural labourers (i.e. people who worked someone else's land in return for payment); 0 workers in livestock, forestry, fishing, hunting, plantations, orchards, etc.; 0 in mining and quarrying; 16 household industry workers; 6 workers employed in other manufacturing, processing, service, and repair roles; 0 construction workers; 25 employed in trade and commerce; 0 employed in transport, storage, and communications; and 34 in other services.
