= Paho =

Paho Pāhu
- Village
- Map showing Paho (#549) in Khiron CD block

- Location in Uttar Pradesh, India
- Coordinates: 26.33448°N 80.932404°E
- Country: India
- State: Uttar Pradesh
- District: Raebareli

Area
  - Total: 8.66 km^{2} (3.34 sq mi)

Population (2011)
  - Total: 5,620
  - Density: 649/km^{2} (1,680/sq mi)

Languages
  - Official: Hindi
- Time zone: UTC+5:30 (IST)
- Vehicle registration: UP-35

Paho, also spelled Pahu, is a village in Khiron block of Rae Bareli district, Uttar Pradesh, India. It is located near the road from Raebareli to Mauranwan and Unnao, close to the border with Unnao district. It is 18 km away from Lalganj, the tehsil headquarters. As of 2011, Paho has a population of 5,620 people, in 1,088 households. It has two primary schools and no healthcare facilities, and it hosts a weekly haat but not a permanent market. It is the seat of a nyaya panchayat which also includes 7 other villages.

Paho was historically the seat of a taluqdari estate belonging to a branch of the Bais Rajputs, and the ruins of two old Bais forts are present in the village. One is close to the village, while the other is near the southwestern corner of the village lands.

== History ==
According to oral tradition, Paho was founded sometime around 1100 CE. It later became the seat of a taluqdari estate belonging to a branch of the Saibasi clan of the Bais Rajputs. The Paho taluqa was founded by Mitrajit Singh, one of the eight sons of Rana Doman Deo of Chiloli. Mitrajit Singh accompanied Aurangzeb on a military expedition to Kandahar and was killed in an avalanche in 1647. Mitrajit Singh's ninth-generation descendant, Bhup Singh, lost possession of most of the taluqa's villages. At the time of the British summary settlement in 1856, Paho itself was assigned to the Gautam cultivators, although it was restored to the Bais in 1859 with the Gautams as under-proprietors. By the turn of the century, the Paho taluqa consisted of five villages and three pattis in the pargana of Khiron, one village each in the parganas of Sareni and Dalmau, and one mahal in the pargana of Raebareli. The taluqdar also held the Gulariha estate of five villages in Unnao district.

In 1901, Paho's population was recorded as 2,859 people, mostly consisting of Gautams and Bais along with a Muslim minority of 175 people. The village had an upper primary school at that point.

The 1951 census recorded Paho as comprising 7 hamlets, with a total population of 2,865 people (1,414 male and 1,451 female), in 637 households and 519 physical houses. The area of the village was given as 2,244 acres. 257 residents were literate, 254 male and 3 female. The village was listed as belonging to the pargana of Khiron and the thana of Gurbakshganj. Paho had a primary school at that point, which on 1 January had 202 students in attendance.

The 1961 census recorded Paho as comprising 7 hamlets, with a total population of 2,852 people (1,373 male and 1,479 female), in 624 households and 548 physical houses. The area of the village was given as 2,244 acres and it had a post office at that point.

The 1981 census recorded Paho as having a population of 3,718 people, in 621 households, and having an area of 953.44 hectares. The main staple foods were given as wheat and rice.

The 1991 census recorded Paho as having a total population of 4,444 people (2,251 male and 2,193 female), in 767 households and 754 physical houses. The area of the village was listed as 866 hectares. Members of the 0-6 age group numbered 848, or 19% of the total; this group was 53% male (446) and 47% female (402). Members of scheduled castes made up 27% of the village's population, while no members of scheduled tribes were recorded. The literacy rate of the village was 42% (1,256 men and 632 women). 1,269 people were classified as main workers (1,086 men and 183 women), while 179 people were classified as marginal workers (all women); the remaining 2,996 residents were non-workers. The breakdown of main workers by employment category was as follows: 645 cultivators (i.e. people who owned or leased their own land); 333 agricultural labourers (i.e. people who worked someone else's land in return for payment); 11 workers in livestock, forestry, fishing, hunting, plantations, orchards, etc.; 1 in mining and quarrying; 26 household industry workers; 51 workers employed in other manufacturing, processing, service, and repair roles; 4 construction workers; 43 employed in trade and commerce; 5 employed in transport, storage, and communications; and 152 in other services.
