= Atarhar =

Atarhar Atarhār
- Village
- Map showing Atarhar (#545) in Khiron CD block

- Location in Uttar Pradesh, India
- Coordinates: 26.320922°N 80.875365°E
- Country India: India
- State: Uttar Pradesh
- District: Raebareli

Area
  - Total: 3.506 km^{2} (1.354 sq mi)

Population (2011)
  - Total: 3,296
  - Density: 940.1/km^{2} (2,435/sq mi)

Languages
  - Official: Hindi
- Time zone: UTC+5:30 (IST)
- Vehicle registration: UP-33

Atarhar is a village in Khiron block of Rae Bareli district, Uttar Pradesh, India. It is located 21 km from Lalganj, the tehsil headquarters. As of 2011, it has a population of 3,296 people, in 626 households. It has two primary schools and no healthcare facilities.

The 1961 census recorded Atarhar (as "Atra Har") as comprising 5 hamlets, with a total population of 1,407 people (680 male and 727 female), in 269 households and 229 physical houses. The area of the village was given as 865 acres.

The 1981 census recorded Atarhar as having a population of 1,867 people, in 333 households, and having an area of 350.47 hectares. The main staple foods were given as wheat and rice.
