= Hardi, Raebareli =

Hardi
- Village
- Map showing Hardi (#557) in Khiron CD block

- Location in Uttar Pradesh, India
- Coordinates: 26.293568°N 80.895121°E
- Country India: India
- State: Uttar Pradesh
- District: Raebareli

Area
  - Total: 1.649 km^{2} (0.637 sq mi)

Population (2011)
  - Total: 1,675
  - Density: 1,016/km^{2} (2,631/sq mi)

Languages
  - Official: Hindi
- Time zone: UTC+5:30 (IST)
- Vehicle registration: UP-35

Hardi is a village in Khiron block of Rae Bareli district, Uttar Pradesh, India. It is located 22 km from Lalganj, the tehsil headquarters. As of 2011, it has a population of 1,675 people, in 304 households. It has one primary school and no healthcare facilities.

The 1961 census recorded Hardi as comprising 5 hamlets, with a total population of 660 people (335 male and 325 female), in 112 households and 111 physical houses. The area of the village was given as 416 acres.

The 1981 census recorded Hardi as having a population of 1,001 people, in 161 households, and having an area of 168.35 hectares. The main staple foods were given as wheat and rice.
