= Bhitargaon =

Town in Kanpur district famous for its ancient Hindu temple

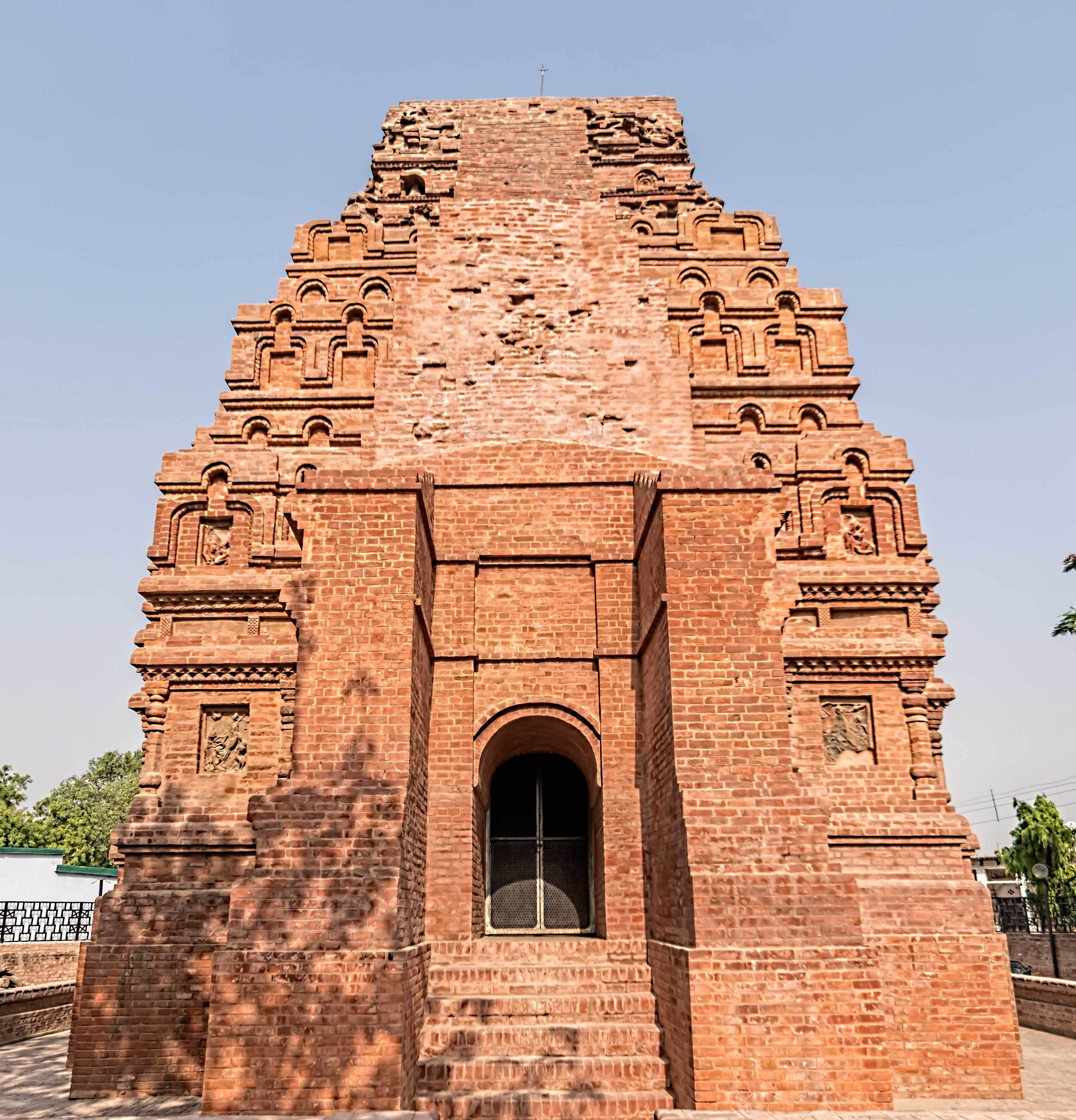
- Bhitargaon temple in Kanpur district, Uttar Pradesh, India

- Location within South Asia Location within Uttar Pradesh
- 26.210556°N 80.276111°E
- Type: Hindu Temple
- Cultures: Gupta Empire
- Location: Bhitargaon, Kanpur district, Uttar Pradesh, India

History
- Built: Late 5th century CE

Bhitargaon is a town, near city of Kanpur in Kanpur Nagar district, Uttar Pradesh, India, known for its ancient Hindu temple, the largest Indian brick temple to survive from the time of the Gupta Empire. Despite being heavily restored, a number of original features remain. It is dated to the late 5th century.

== Bhitargaon Temple ==
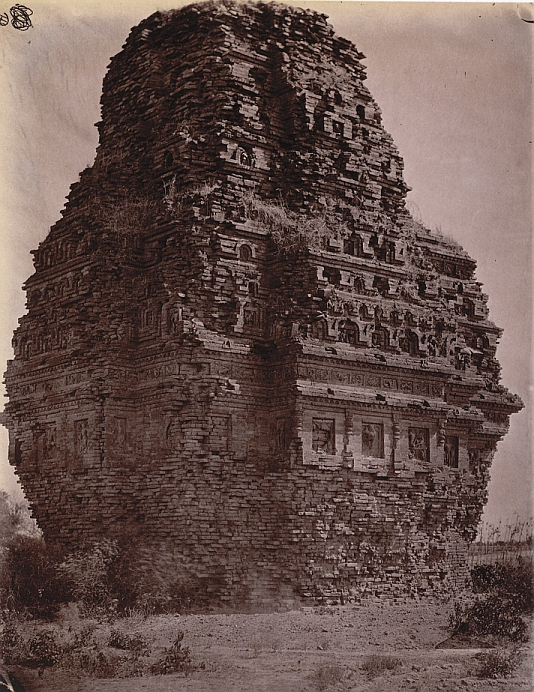
Rear view of the temple at Bhitargaon, 1875.

The Bhitargaon Temple is a terraced brick building fronted with a terracotta panel. Built in the 5th century during the Gupta period, it is the oldest remaining brick/terracotta Hindu shrine with a roof and a high shikhara, though its upper chamber did sustain some damage in the 18th century.

The temple is built on a square plan with double-recessed corners and faces east. There is a tall pyramidal spire over the garbhagriha. The walls are decorated with terracotta panels depicting Shiva and Vishnu etc. When Alexander Cunningham first visited the site, the remains of the porch and of the ardhamandapa were still visible, which later collapsed.

=== Description of the architecture and layout of Bhitargaon temple ===
The construction material is bricks and terracotta. The brick size is 18" x 9" x 3" and the other salient features are following:

- The size of platform on which the temple is built is 36 feet x 47 feet.
- The sanctum is 15 feet x 15 feet internally.
- The sanctum is double story.
- The wall thickness is 8 feet.
- The total height from ground to top is 68.25 feet.
- There is no window.
- The terracotta sculpture depicts both secular and religious theme such as deities like Ganesha and Durga Mahishasuramardini. Myths and stories representing abduction of Sita and the penance of Nara-Narayana.
- Shikara is a stepped pyramid and got damaged by thunder in 1894.
- The first story of sanctum fell in 1850.

== Behta Bujurg temple ==
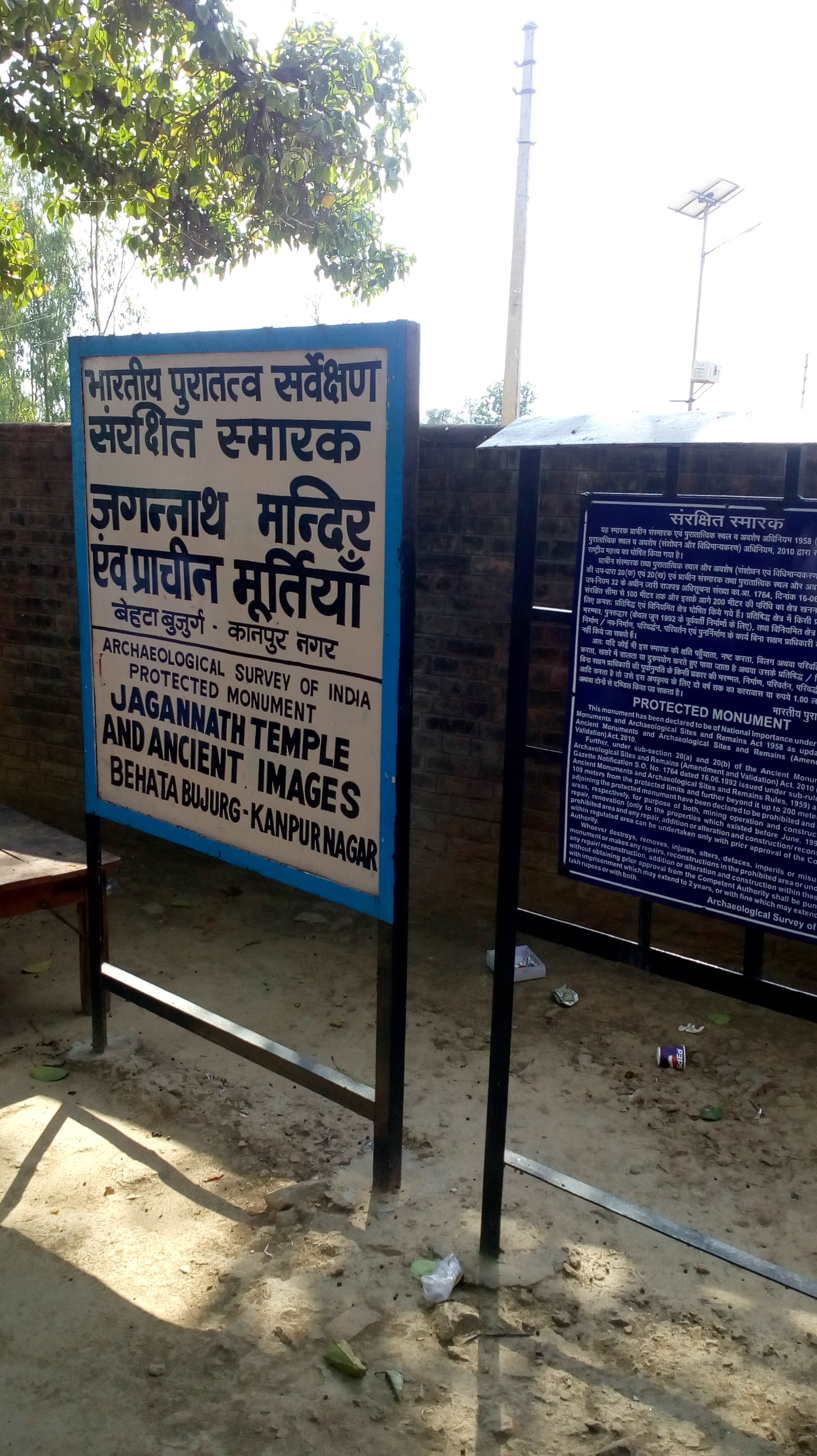
ASI notice

There is another ancient temple in Behta Bujurg (or Behata Bujurg) village which is only 4.3 km far from Bhitargaon, also protected by the Archaeological Survey of India. The temple is dedicated to Lord Jagannath, and has a highly unusual curving shape, with buddhist stupa(Mound) like resemblance. However a close look reveals nagara style curvilinear shape. There are significant detached ancient sculptures: Lord Jagannath idol, a Surya (sun deity) sculpture and a Lord Vishnu sculpture carved on a large block of stone depicting lord vishnu resting on seshnaga. The temple is known locally as the "Rain Temple" as the ceiling is said to drip water several days before the rain arrive, which is of great interest to local farmers day by day most of tourist and urban peoples came in this temple.

== Other historic brick temples ==
- Po Nagar and Po Klong Garai
- Mahabodhi Temple
- id:Candi Bima Dieng Candi Bima
- Sambor Prei Kuk
- Sirpur, Mahasamund Laksman temple
- Rajgir Maniyar Math, Vaibhar giri temples
- Bishnupur, Bankura
- Kherahat temple
- "Kalar, brick temple". arthistory.upenn.edu.

== Gallery ==
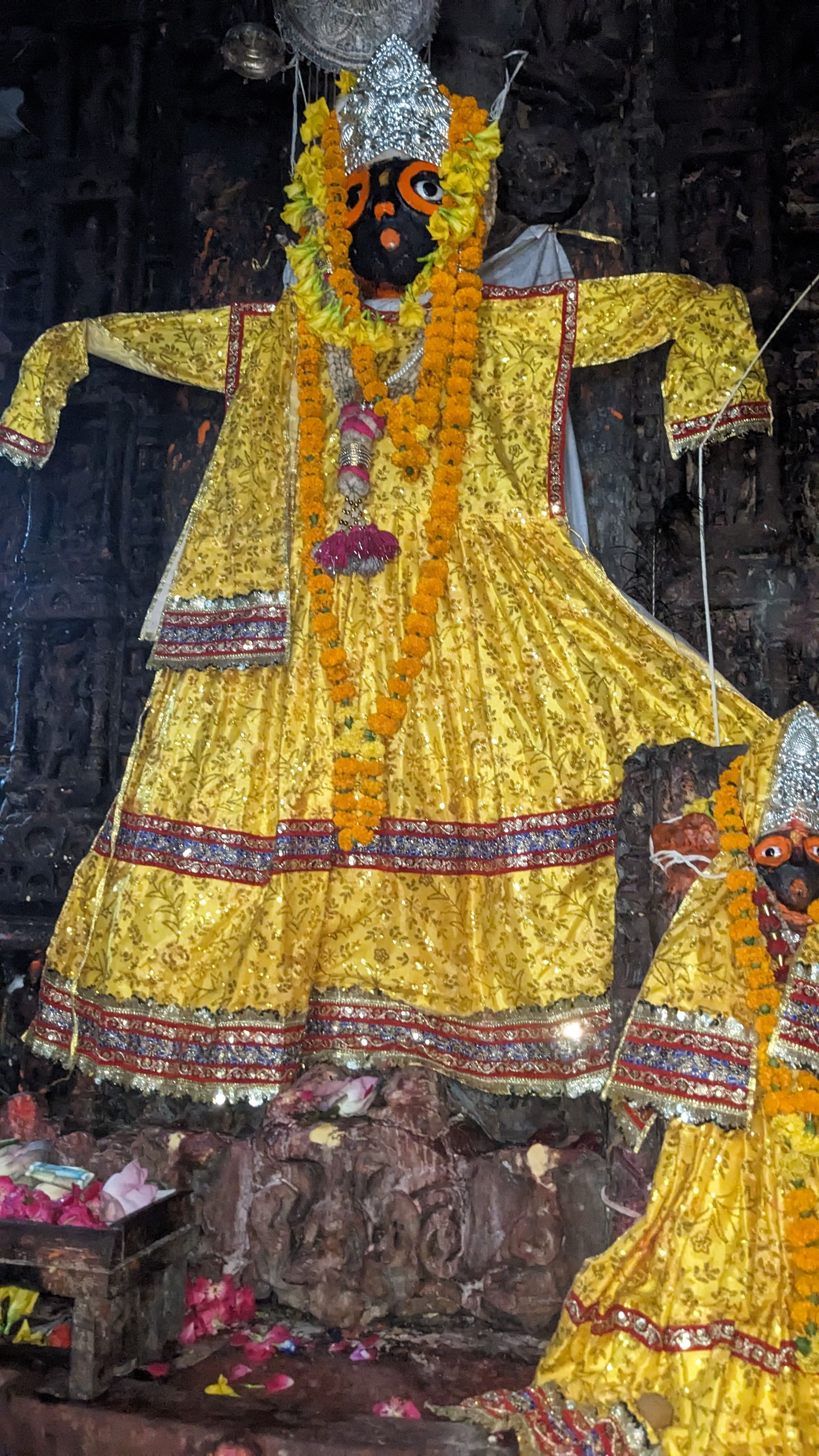
The Idol of Lord Jagannath inside the temple at Baheta Bujurg.

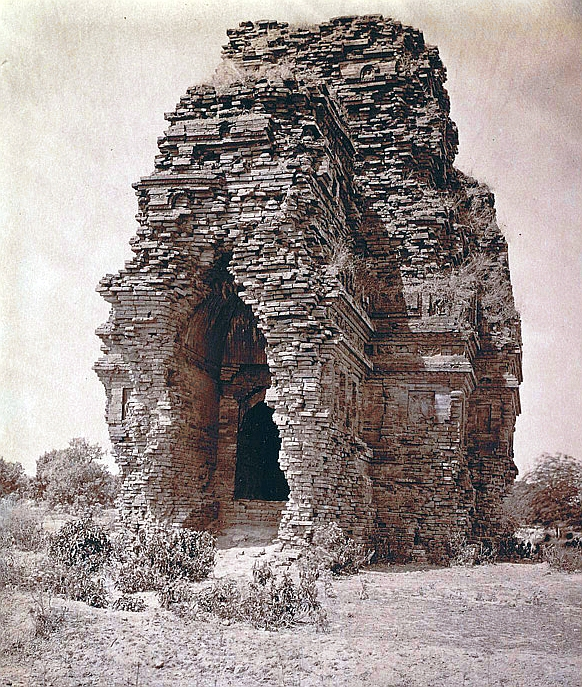
Front view of the temple at Bhitargaon, 1875

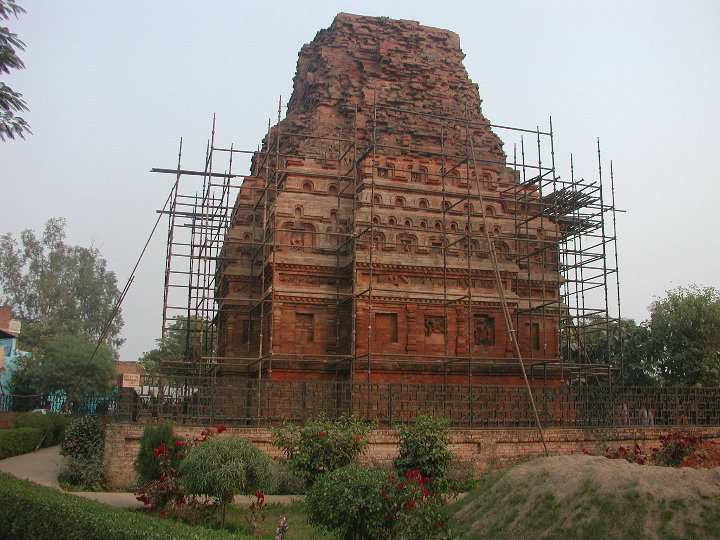
The oldest remaining Hindu shrine Brick Temple

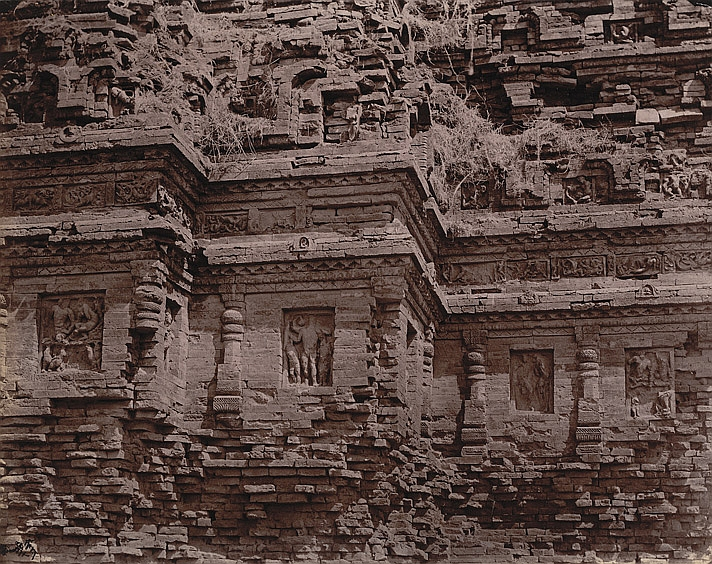
Close view of façade showing the detail of mouldings and sculpture niches, 1875

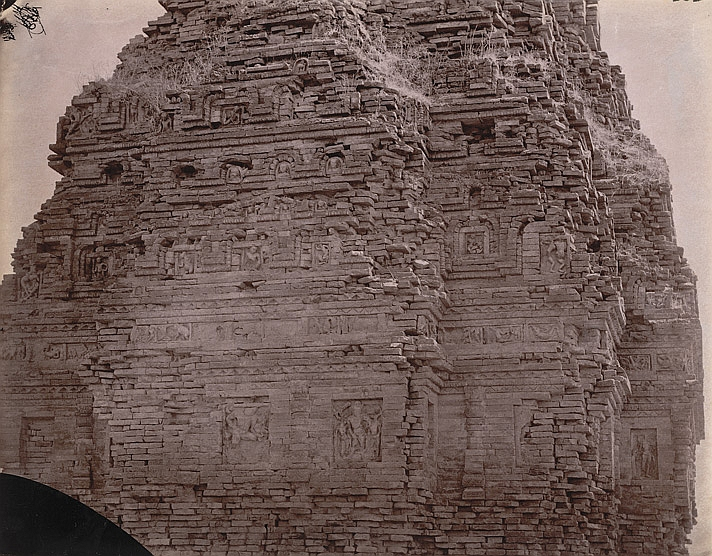
Close view of temple façade showing the detail of mouldings and sculpture niches, 1878

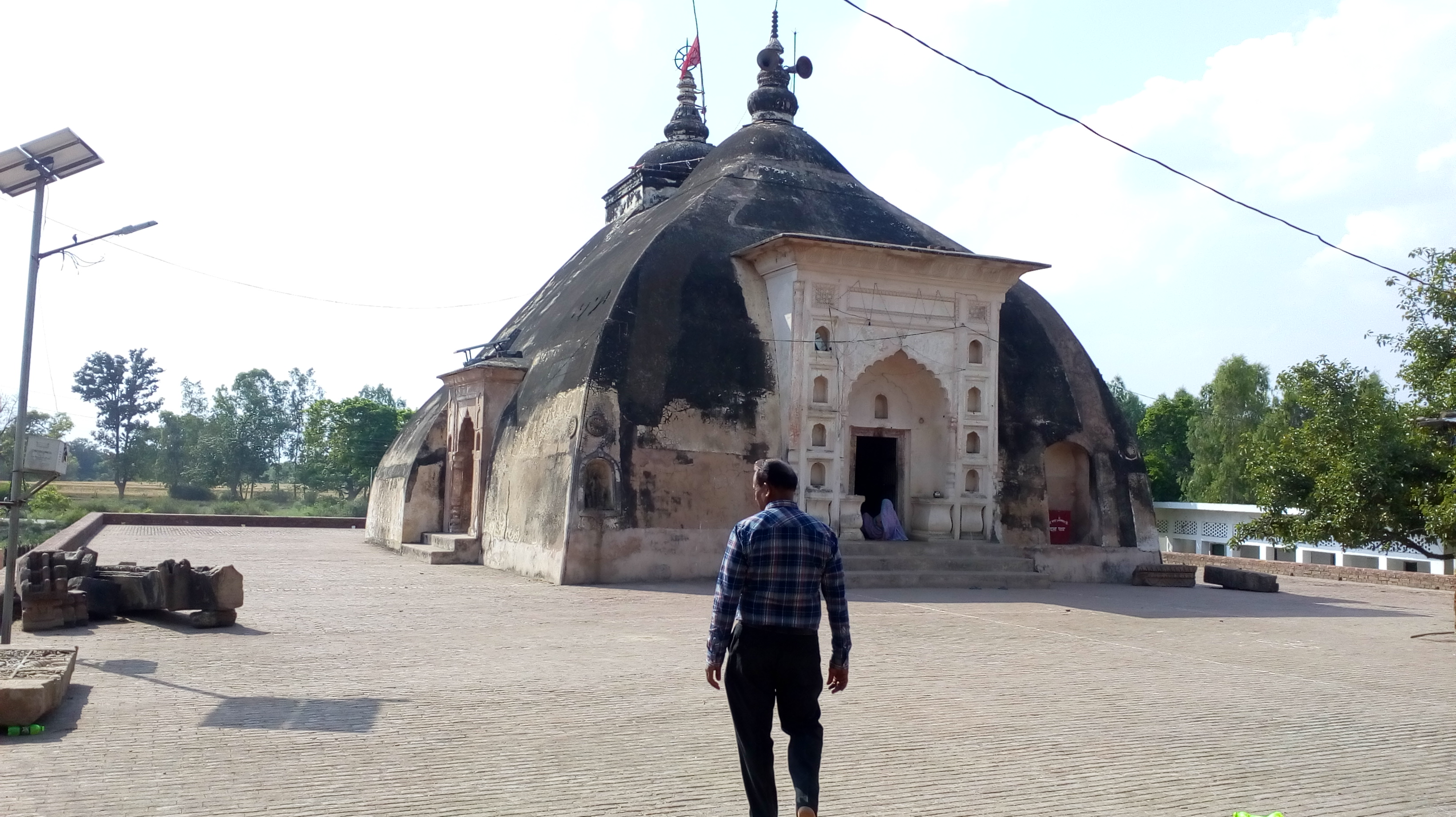
Behta Bujurg temple

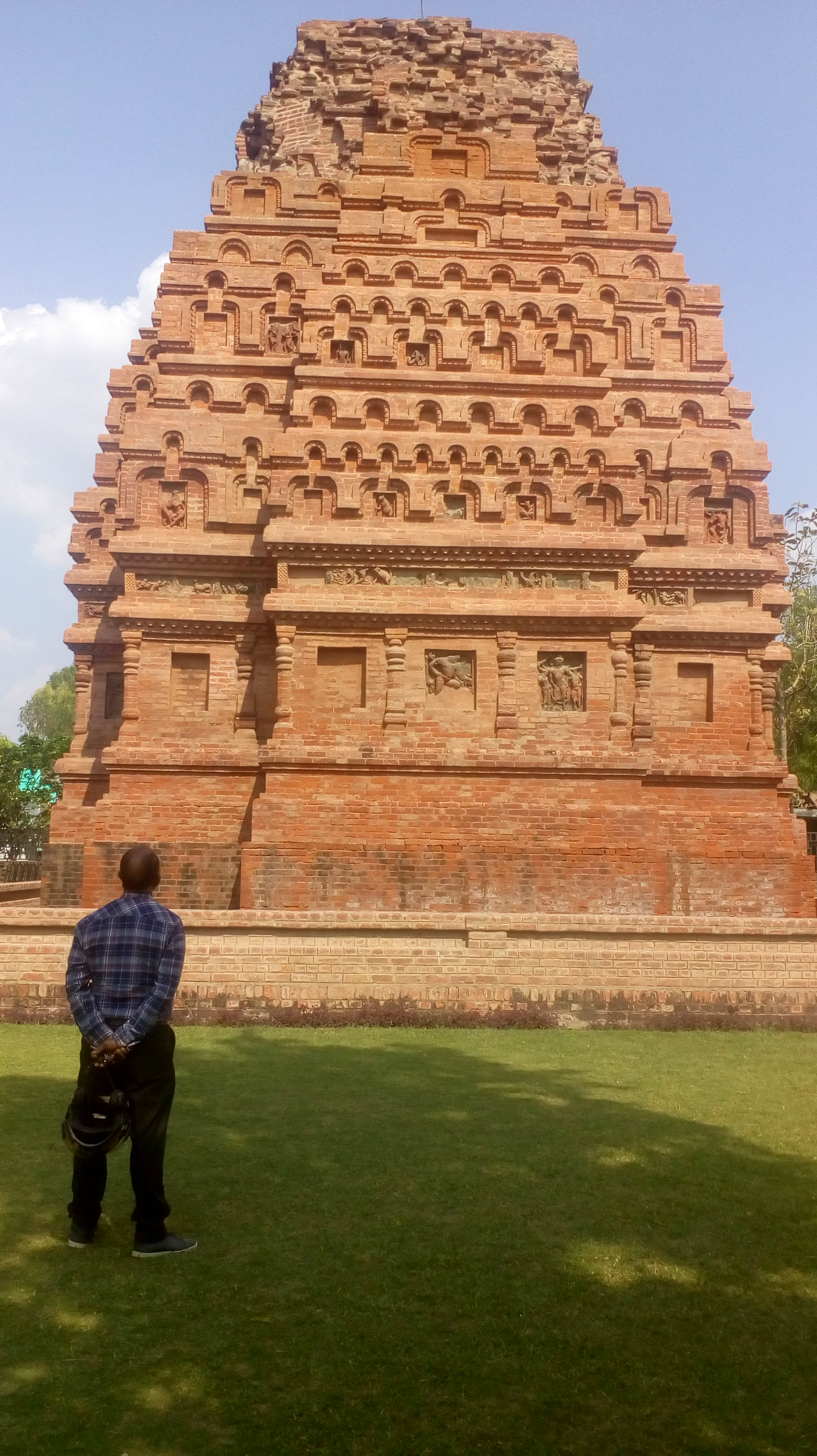
Rear view of the Bhitargaon temple.

== See also ==
- Gupta art
- Hindu temple architecture (Historical Chronology)
- Teli Ka Mandir, Gwalior
