= Tikwamau =

Tikwamau Tikwāmau, Tikwa Mau
- Village
- Map showing Tikwamau (#584) in Khiron CD block

- Location in Uttar Pradesh, India
- Coordinates: 26.248513°N 80.98078°E
- Country: India
- State: Uttar Pradesh
- District: Raebareli

Area
  - Total: 1.561 km^{2} (0.603 sq mi)

Population (2011)
  - Total: 1,065
  - Density: 682.3/km^{2} (1,767/sq mi)

Languages
  - Official: Hindi
- Time zone: UTC+5:30 (IST)
- Vehicle registration: UP-35

Tikwamau is a village in Khiron block of Rae Bareli district, Uttar Pradesh, India. It is located 15 km from Lalganj, the tehsil headquarters. As of 2011, it has a population of 1,065 people, in 201 households. It has one primary school and hosts both a weekly haat and a permanent market. However, there are no formal healthcare facilities. It is the headquarters of a nyaya panchayat which also includes 8 other villages.

The 1951 census recorded Tikwamau (as "Tikwa Mau") as comprising 1 hamlet, with a population of 365 people (185 male and 180 female), in 60 households and 60 physical houses. The area of the village was given as 382 acres. 72 residents were literate, 58 male and 14 female. The village was listed as belonging to the pargana of Khiron and the thana of Gurbakshganj.

The 1961 census recorded Tikwamau (as "Tekawamau") as comprising 1 hamlet, with a total population of 429 people (202 male and 227 female), in 75 households and 70 physical houses. The area of the village was given as 382 acres.

The 1981 census recorded Tikwamau (as "Tikawamau") as having a population of 600 people, in 103 households, and having an area of 157.03 hectares. The main staple foods were given as wheat and rice.

The 1991 census recorded Tikwamau (as "Tikwa Mau") as having a total population of 632 people (302 male and 330 female), in 104 households and 104 physical houses. The area of the village was listed as 151 hectares. Members of the 0-6 age group numbered 113, or 18% of the total; this group was 47% male (53) and 53% female (60). Members of scheduled castes made up 32% of the village's population, while no members of scheduled tribes were recorded. The literacy rate of the village was 36% (119 men and 106 women). 143 people were classified as main workers (140 men and 3 women), while 0 people were classified as marginal workers; the remaining 489 residents were non-workers. The breakdown of main workers by employment category was as follows: 93 cultivators (i.e. people who owned or leased their own land); 8 agricultural labourers (i.e. people who worked someone else's land in return for payment); 2 workers in livestock, forestry, fishing, hunting, plantations, orchards, etc.; 3 in mining and quarrying; 1 household industry worker; 2 workers employed in other manufacturing, processing, service, and repair roles; 0 construction workers; 5 employed in trade and commerce; 0 employed in transport, storage, and communications; and 29 in other services.
