= 1951 census of India =

- 9 to 28 February 1951

General information
- Country: India

Results
- Total population: 361,088,090 (13.32%)
- Most populous state: Uttar Pradesh (60,274,800)
- Least populous state: Sikkim (138,093)

The 1951 census of India was the ninth in a series of censuses held in India every decade since 1871. It was also the first census after independence and Partition of India. 1951 census was also the first census to be conducted under 1948 Census of India Act. The first census of the Indian Republic began on February 10, 1951.

The population of India was counted as 361,088,090 (1000:946 male:female) Total population increased by 42,427,510, 13.31% more than the 318,660,580 people counted during the 1941 census. No census was done for Jammu and Kashmir in 1951 and its figures were interpolated from 1941 and 1961 state census. National Register of Citizens for Assam (NRC) was prepared soon after the census. In 1951, at the time of the first population census, just 18% of Indians were literate while life expectancy was 32 years. Based on 1951 census of displaced persons, 7,226,000 Muslims went to Pakistan (both West and East Pakistan) from India, while 7,249,000 Hindus and Sikhs moved to India from Pakistan (both West and East Pakistan).

== Language demographics ==
Languages of India in 1951
1. Hindi, Urdu, Punjabi, 149,944,311 (42.0%)
2. Telugu, 32,999,916 (9.24%)
3. Marathi, 27,049,522 (7.57%)
4. Tamil, 26,546,764 (7.43%)
5. Bengali, 25,121,674 (7.03%)
6. Gujarati, 16,310,771 (4.57%)
7. Kannada, 14,471,764 (4.05%)
8. Malayalam, 13,380,109 (3.69%)
9. Odia, 13,153,909 (3.21%)
10. Assamese, 4,988,226 (1.39%)
11. others (9.81%)

Separate figures for Hindi, Urdu, and Punjabi were not issued, due to the partition 1947 and fact that returns were intentionally recorded incorrectly in states such as East Punjab, Himachal Pradesh, Delhi, PEPSU, and Bilaspur.

== Religious demographics ==
Major religious groups in India in 1951
1. Hinduism, 303,675,084 (84.1%)
2. Islam, 35,386,633 (9.80%)
3. Christianity, 8,305,026 (2.30%)
4. Sikhism, 6,824,565 (1.89%)
5. Buddhism, 2,672,051 (0.74%)
6. Animism, others, 1,552,678 (0.46%)
7. Jainism, 1,661,005 (0.43%)

In 1951, India had 305 million Hindus (84.1% of the population), 35.4 million Muslims (9.8%), 8.3 million Christians, (2.3%), and 6.86 million Sikhs, (1.9%). 1951 Indian census showed that there were 8.3 million Christians. Hindus had made up about 73% of the population of British India. Just after independence and the partition of India, the proportion of Hindus rose to around 85%.

== See also ==
- Census of India prior to independence
- 1891 census of India
- Demographics of India
