= 1991 census of India =

- 9 to 28 February 1991

General information
- Country: India

Results
- Total population: 838,583,988 (22.38%)
- Most populous state: Uttar Pradesh (132,062,800)
- Least populous state: Sikkim (406,000)

The 1991 census of India was the 13th in a series of censuses held in India every decade since 1871.

The population of India was counted as 838,583,988. The number of enumerators was 1.6 million.

== Religious demographics ==
Hindus comprise 69.01 crore (81.53%) and Muslims were 10.67 crore(12.61%) in 1991 census.

Population trends for major religious groups in India (1991)
Religious group	Population %
Hindu	81.53%
Muslim	12.61%
Christian	2.32%
Sikh	1.94%
Buddhist	0.77%
Jain	0.40%
Parsi	0.08%
Animist, others	0.44%

== Language data ==
The 1991 census recognizes 1,576 classified "mother tongues". According to the 1991 census, 22 languages had more than a million native speakers, 50 had more than 100,000 and 114 had more than 10,000 native speakers. The remaining accounted for a total of 566,000 native speakers (out of a total of 838 million Indians in 1991). The number of Sanskrit speakers in India in 1991 census was 49,736.

== Other statistics ==
- Census towns in 1991 census of India were 1,702.
- Jammu and Kashmir was excluded from census-taking in 1991 due to Insurgency in Jammu and Kashmir. The number for J&K was derived by interpolation for the population of religious communities in the state.
- Census was not conducted in Assam in the previous census in 1981 due to separatist movements that time. The census data for Assam was done based on interpolation.

== See also ==
- Demographics of India
- Census town
