= Nyaya panchayat =

System of dispute resolution at the village level

A Nyaya panchayat (lit. 'Justice panchayat') is a system of dispute resolution at the village level in the panchayati raj system of India.

== Current movements in India ==
Legislation to formalize these bodies and bring them within the ambit of organised justice in India was planned as part of the Panchayati Raj reforms of Rajiv Gandhi in the 1980s, but was put on hold to coincide with broader reform of the justice system, which was never carried out. Following the victory of the Congress Party-led United Progressive Alliance in the 2004 Indian general election, the National Advisory Council advised the Government of India to introduce legislation. To draft legislation in this regard a drafting committee, under the chairmanship of Professor Upendra Baxi, has been formed by the Ministry of Panchayati Raj, Government of India. The bill on the issue is proposed to be debated in the winter session of the Indian Parliament. Nyaya panchayat can only fine up to ₹100 and cannot send anyone to jail.

== Constitutional support for nyaya panchayat ==
Since a forum for the resolution of disputes with the participation of people in local justice administration is the goal envisaged by Article 39A of the Constitution of India, it is strongly felt by some jurists and social scientists that it is incumbent on the government to take immediate steps to activate nyaya panchayats, given that it might not be possible to render access justice in rural areas simpler and quicker. It is also argued that nyaya panchayats guided by local traditions, culture and behavioural pattern of the village community instill confidence in the people towards the administration of justice.

== 114th law commission report ==
The Law Commission, in its August 1986 (Chapter V para. 5.3) indicating that nyaya panchayats made precisely this point, observing that “Article 39A of the Constitution of India directs the State to secure that the operation of the legal system promotes justice, on a basis of equal opportunity, and shall, in particular provide free legal aid, by suitable legislation or schemes or in any other way, to ensure that opportunities for securing justice are not denied to any citizen by economic or other disabilities. This is the constitutional imperative. Denial of justice on the grounds of economic and other disabilities is in nutshell referred to what has been known as problematic access to law. The Constitution now commands us to remove impediments to access to justice in a systematic manner. All agencies of the Government are now under a fundamental obligation to enhance access to justice. Article 40 which directs the State to take steps to organise village panchayats and endow them with such powers and authority as may be necessary to enable them to function as units of self-government, has to be appreciated afresh in the light of the mandate of the new article 39A.”

== Judicial backlog ==
With a rapid increase in the number of people approaching the courts, the primary concern faced by the Judiciary is the escalation in the number of new cases coming in and an ever-increasing backlog, which seems to have assumed insurmountable propositions making access to justice to the public at large a far delayed and long drawn process. There are more than three crore cases pending before the various courts of India as stated by the Chief Justice of the Supreme Court of India.

== Other reasons ==
The following considerations seem to have prompted the Law Commission and the Study Team on nyaya panchayats to recommend the revitalisation of nyaya panchayats: (The Law Commission, Fourteenth Report and the Report of the Study Team on nyaya panchayats extracted from an article written by K.N. Chandrasekharan Pillai titled “Criminal Jurisdiction of nyaya panchayats” Journal of the Indian Law Institute Vol. 19, October–December 1977 p. 443)

1. They would dispose of a large number of cases and thus relieve the burden of regular courts.
2. They would succeed in getting a large number of cases compromised through peaceful conciliation.
3. The villagers in general would be satisfied with the administration of justice obtaining in village or panchayat courts and that the decisions of these courts on the whole would do substantial justice.
4. Appeals and revisions from these decisions would be small in number.
5. There should be speedy and cheap disposal of cases.
6. The litigants and witnesses who are mostly agriculturists can conveniently attend the courts and thus there would be no interference with agricultural activities in the village.
7. The panchayat could bring justice nearer to the villager without involving the expenditure which would otherwise have to be incurred in establishing regular courts.
8. Panchayat would have an educative value.
9. Local courts acquainted with the customs of the neighbourhood and nuances of the local idiom are better able to understand why certain things are said or done.
10. An institution nearer to the people holds out greater opportunities for settlement and a decision taken by it does not leave behind that trial of bitterness which generally follows in the wake of litigation in ordinary courts.
11. There are better chances of conciliatory method of approach in nyaya panchayats.
12. People in a village are so closely known to each other that the parties to a dispute would not be able to conceal or produce false evidence easily and those who tell lies before the nyaya panchayat face the risk of being looked down upon and even boycotted by others.
13. Panchas being drawn from among simple village folk strive at decisions which are fair and at the same time consistent with the peculiar conditions of the parties.

Hon’ble Justice S.B Sinha, Judge Supreme Court of India, emphasising the importance of nyaya panchayats in a lecture delivered to District Judges observed that, “There is also a need to deliberate on the methodologies to be adopted for encouraging justice dispensation through the traditional forum of Panchayats. This age-old institution has found new vigour with the introduction of the 73rd Amendment to the Constitution, and most accordingly to be considered another pillar in the edifice that symbolizes justice. Strengthening the institution of Panchayats and empowering people at the grass-root level to resolve their disputes amicably would solve many of the problems that is faced by conventional justice dispensation machinery in its attempts to percolate to the lowest levels. This would provide a, solution to the problems of access to those living in remote regions.”

== State-level reforms ==
Certain states like Bihar, Chhattisgarh, Himachal Pradesh, Madhya Pradesh, Punjab, Uttar Pradesh and Uttarakhand have already made provisions for establishing village courts.

== See also ==
- Panchayati Raj
