= Dinganj =

- Village
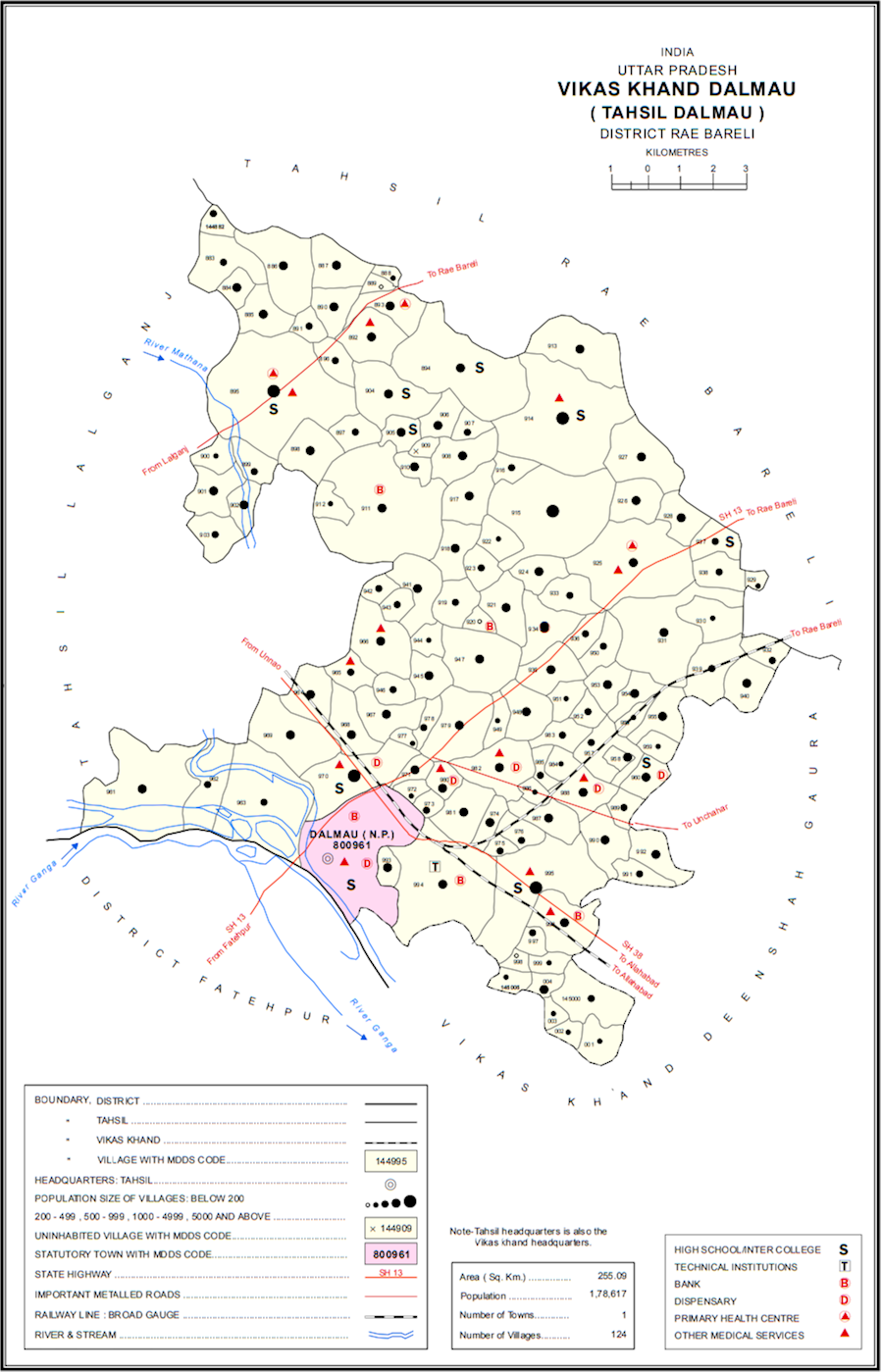
- Map showing Dinganj (#975) in Dalmau CD block

- Location in Uttar Pradesh, India
- Coordinates: 26.06518°N 81.084404°E
- Country India: India
- State: Uttar Pradesh
- District: Raebareli

Area
  - Total: 0.467 km^{2} (0.180 sq mi)

Population (2011)
  - Total: 840
  - Density: 1,800/km^{2} (4,700/sq mi)

Languages
  - Official: Hindi
- Time zone: UTC+5:30 (IST)
- Vehicle registration: UP-35

Dinganj is a village in Dalmau block of Rae Bareli district, Uttar Pradesh, India. It is located 4 km from Dalmau, the block headquarters. As of 2011, it has a population of 840 people, in 140 households. It has two primary schools and no healthcare facilities. It hosts a market twice per week, on Tuesdays and Saturdays; cattle, cloth, and vegetables are the main items traded.

The 1961 census recorded Dinganj as comprising 1 hamlet, with a total population of 406 people (208 male and 198 female), in 80 households and 80 physical houses. The area of the village was given as 108 acres. Average attendance of the twice-weekly market was about 200 people.

The 1981 census recorded Dinganj as having a population of 611 people, in 115 households, and having an area of 48.56 hectares. The main staple foods were listed as wheat and rice.
