= Baras, Raebareli =

Baras
- Village
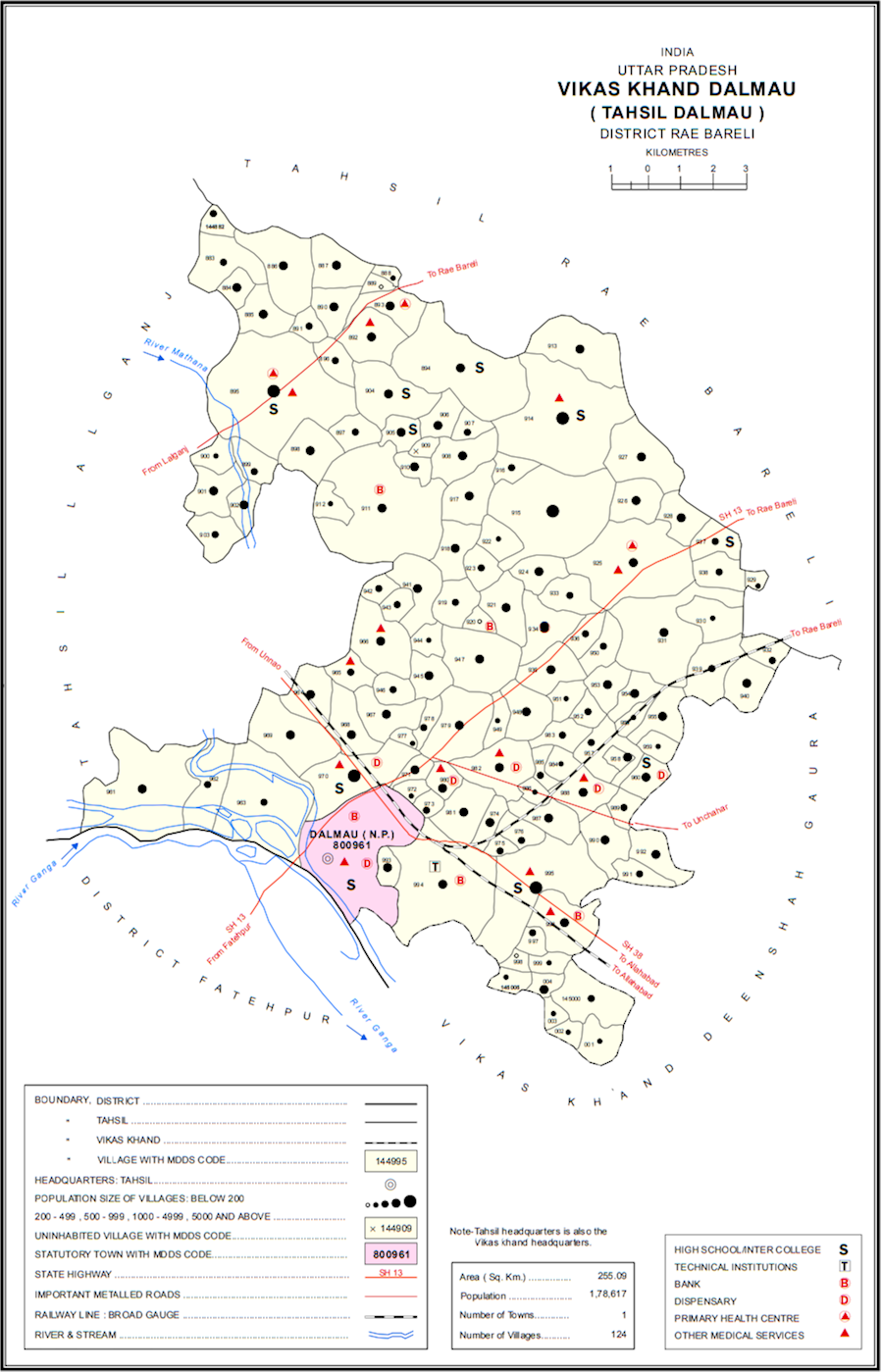
- Map showing Baras (#892) in Dalmau CD block

- Location in Uttar Pradesh, India
- Coordinates: 26.203792°N 81.051178°E
- Country India: India
- State: Uttar Pradesh
- District: Raebareli

Area
  - Total: 2.372 km^{2} (0.916 sq mi)

Population (2011)
  - Total: 1,875
  - Density: 790.5/km^{2} (2,047/sq mi)

Languages
  - Official: Hindi
- Time zone: UTC+5:30 (IST)
- Vehicle registration: UP-35

Baras is a village in Dalmau block of Rae Bareli district, Uttar Pradesh, India. As of 2011, it has a population of 1,875 people, in 316 households. It has two primary schools and one maternity and child welfare centre.

The 1961 census recorded Baras as comprising 4 hamlets, with a total population of 630 people (317 male and 313 female), in 137 households and 122 physical houses. The area of the village was given as 509 acres.

The 1981 census recorded Baras as having a population of 973 people, in 181 households, and having an area of 212.05 hectares. The main staple foods were listed as wheat and rice.
