= Hingamau =

Hingamau Hingāmau
- Village
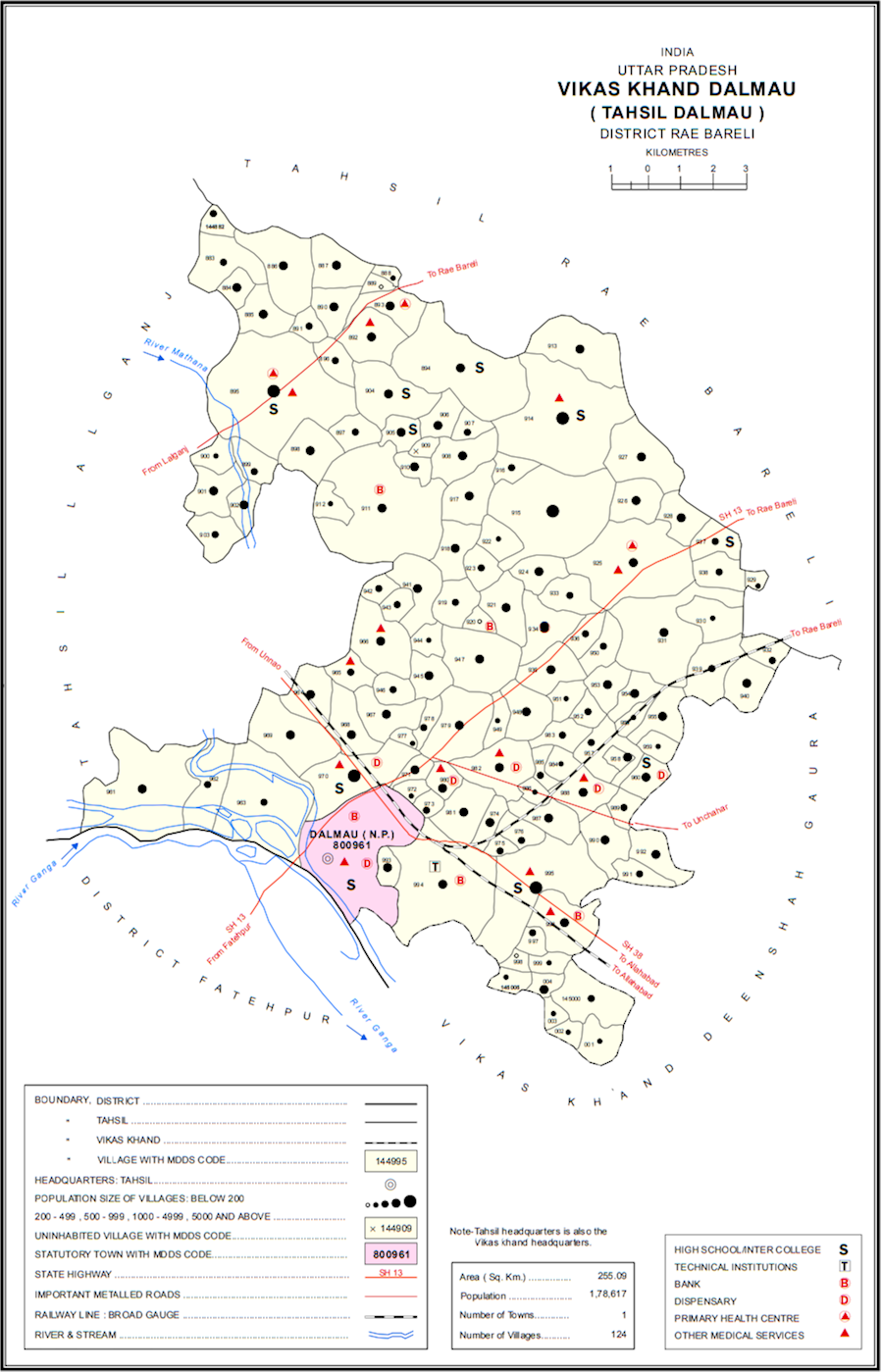
- Map showing Hingamau (#924) in Dalmau CD block

- Location in Uttar Pradesh, India
- Coordinates: 26.140123°N 81.101061°E
- Country India: India
- State: Uttar Pradesh
- District: Raebareli

Area
  - Total: 1.354 km^{2} (0.523 sq mi)

Population (2011)
  - Total: 1,195
  - Density: 882.6/km^{2} (2,286/sq mi)

Languages
  - Official: Hindi
- Time zone: UTC+5:30 (IST)
- Vehicle registration: UP-35

Hingamau is a village in Dalmau block of Rae Bareli district, Uttar Pradesh, India. It is located eleven kilometres (6.8 mi) from Dalmau, the block headquarters. As of 2011, it has a population of 1,195 people, in 194 households. It has one primary school and no healthcare facilities.

The 1961 census recorded Hingamau as comprising 2 hamlets, with a total population of 465 people (227 male and 238 female), in 100 households and 93 physical houses. The area of the village was given as 366 acres.

The 1981 census recorded Hingamau (as "Hingmau") as having a population of 639 people, in 107 households, and having an area of 143.26 hectares (354.0 acres). The main staple foods were listed as wheat and rice.
