= Adilabad, Raebareli =

Adilabad Adilābād, Bhārrapur
- Village
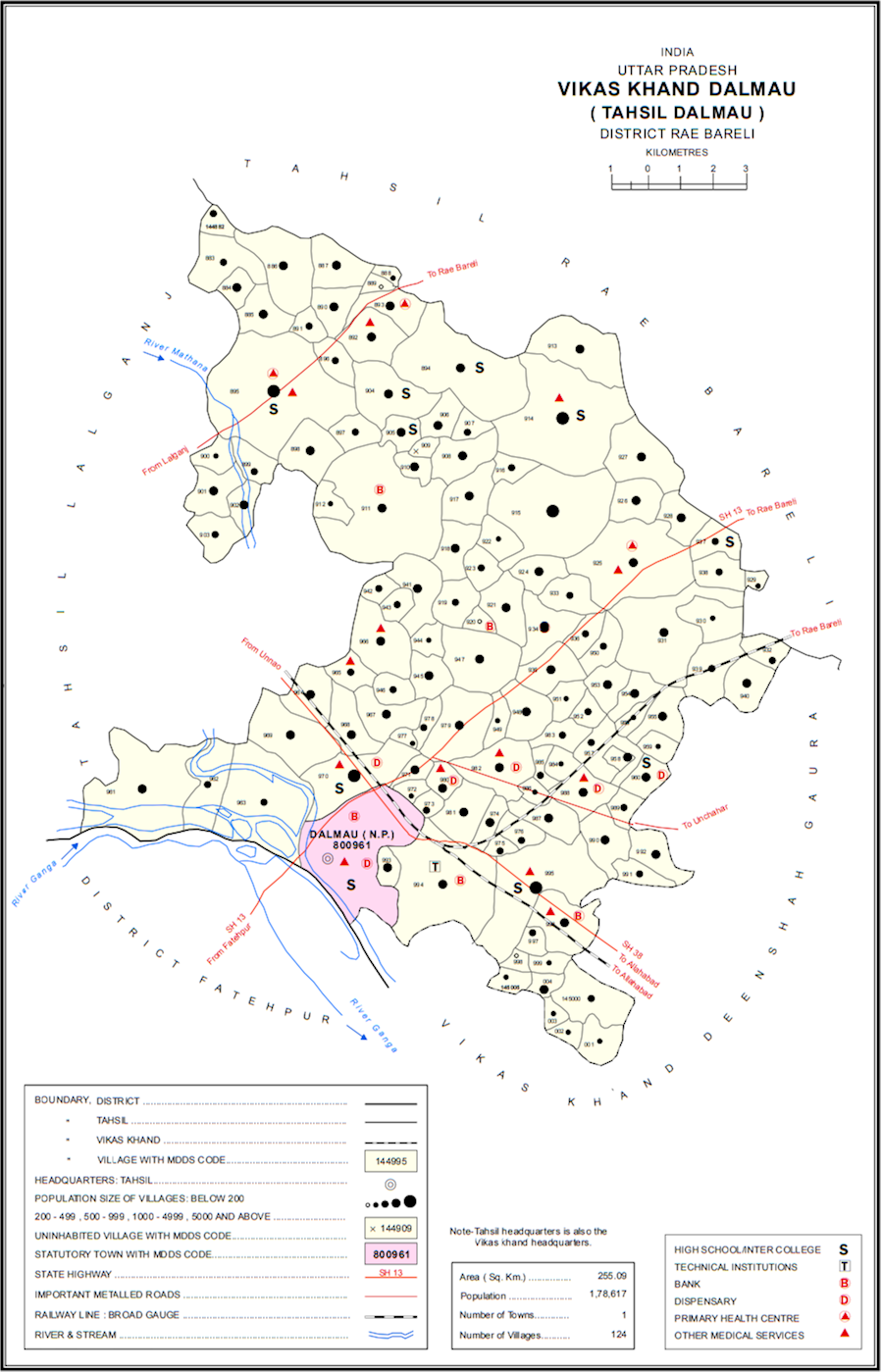
- Map showing Adilabad (#917) in Dalmau CD block

- Location in Uttar Pradesh, India
- Coordinates: 26.162957°N 81.081861°E
- Country India: India
- State: Uttar Pradesh
- District: Raebareli

Area
  - Total: 2.61 km^{2} (1.01 sq mi)

Population (2011)
  - Total: 1,394
  - Density: 534/km^{2} (1,380/sq mi)

Languages
  - Official: Hindi
- Time zone: UTC+5:30 (IST)
- Vehicle registration: UP-35

Adilabad, also called Bharrapur, is a village in Dalmau block of Rae Bareli district, Uttar Pradesh, India. It is located 12 kilometers (7.46 miles) away from Dalmau, the block headquarters. As of 2011, it has a population of 1,394 people, in 238 households. It has a primary Government school and no healthcare facilities within village limits. The village hosts a small market twice per week, on Wednesday and Sunday; Cloth and vegetables are the main items bought and sold at the market.

The 1961 census recorded Adilabad as comprising 4 hamlets, with a total population of 474 people (239 male and 235 female), in 88 households and 85 physical houses. The area of the village was given as 625 acres. Average attendance of the market was about 70 people at that point.

The 1981 census recorded Adilabad as having a population of 674 people, in 125 households, and having an area of 261.02 hectares. The main staple foods were listed as wheat and rice.
