= Aftabnagar =

Aftabnagar Aftābnagar
- Village
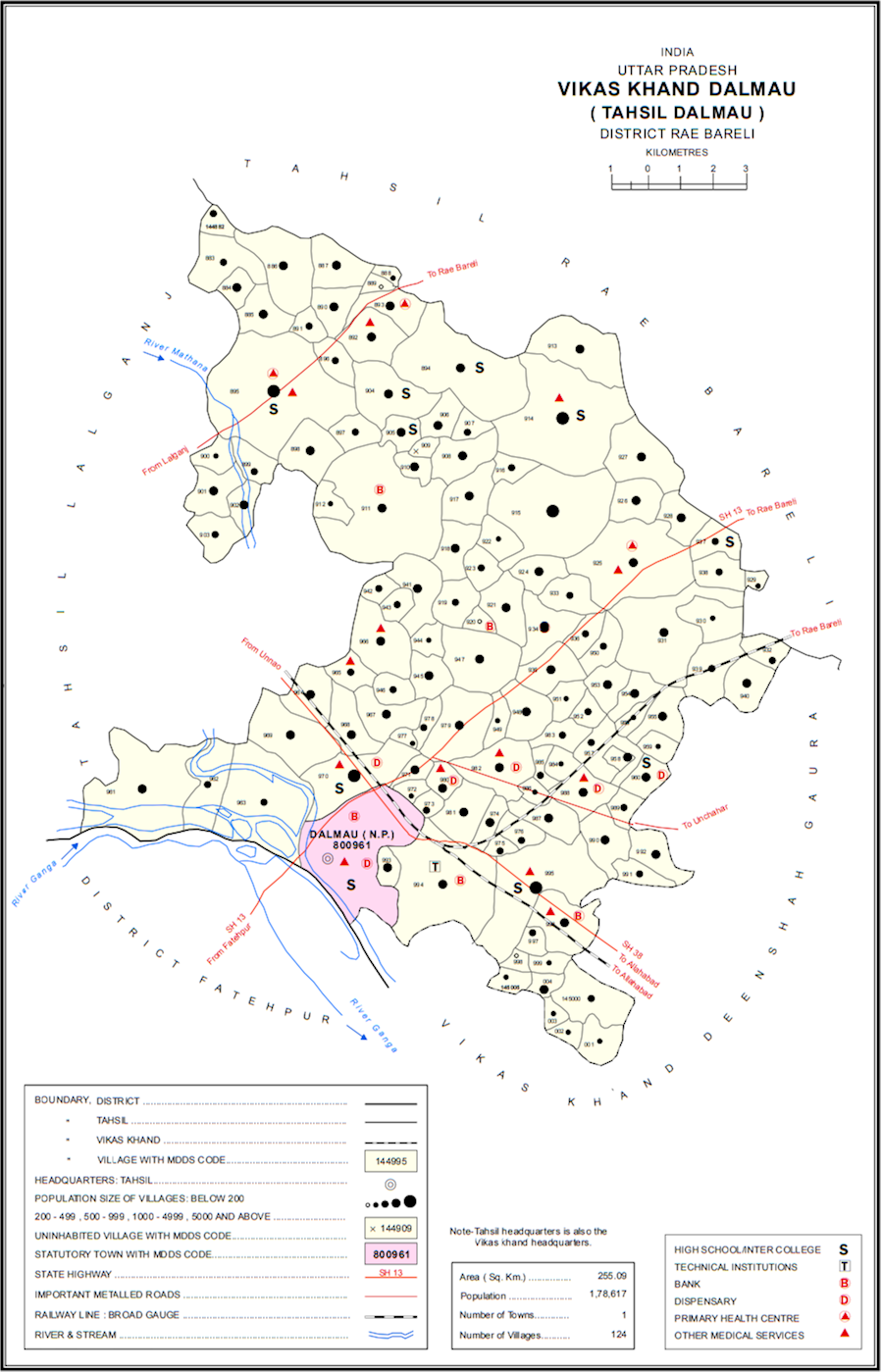
- Map showing Aftabnagar (#969) in Dalmau CD block

- Location in Uttar Pradesh, India
- Coordinates: 26.089383°N 81.042396°E
- Country India: India
- State: Uttar Pradesh
- District: Raebareli

Area
  - Total: 1.053 km^{2} (0.407 sq mi)

Population (2011)
  - Total: 1,000
  - Density: 950/km^{2} (2,500/sq mi)

Languages
  - Official: Hindi
- Time zone: UTC+5:30 (IST)
- Vehicle registration: UP-35

Aftabnagar is a village in Dalmau block of Rae Bareli district, Uttar Pradesh, India. It is located 4 km from Dalmau, the block headquarters. As of 2011, it has a population of 1,000 people, in 192 households. It has no schools and no healthcare facilities.

The 1961 census recorded Aftabnagar as comprising 2 hamlets, with a total population of 358 people (179 male and 179 female), in 69 households and 66 physical houses. The area of the village was given as 414 acres.

The 1981 census recorded Aftabnagar as having a population of 546 people, in 90 households, and having an area of 105.22 hectares. The main staple foods were listed as wheat and rice.
