= Bharsana =

- Village
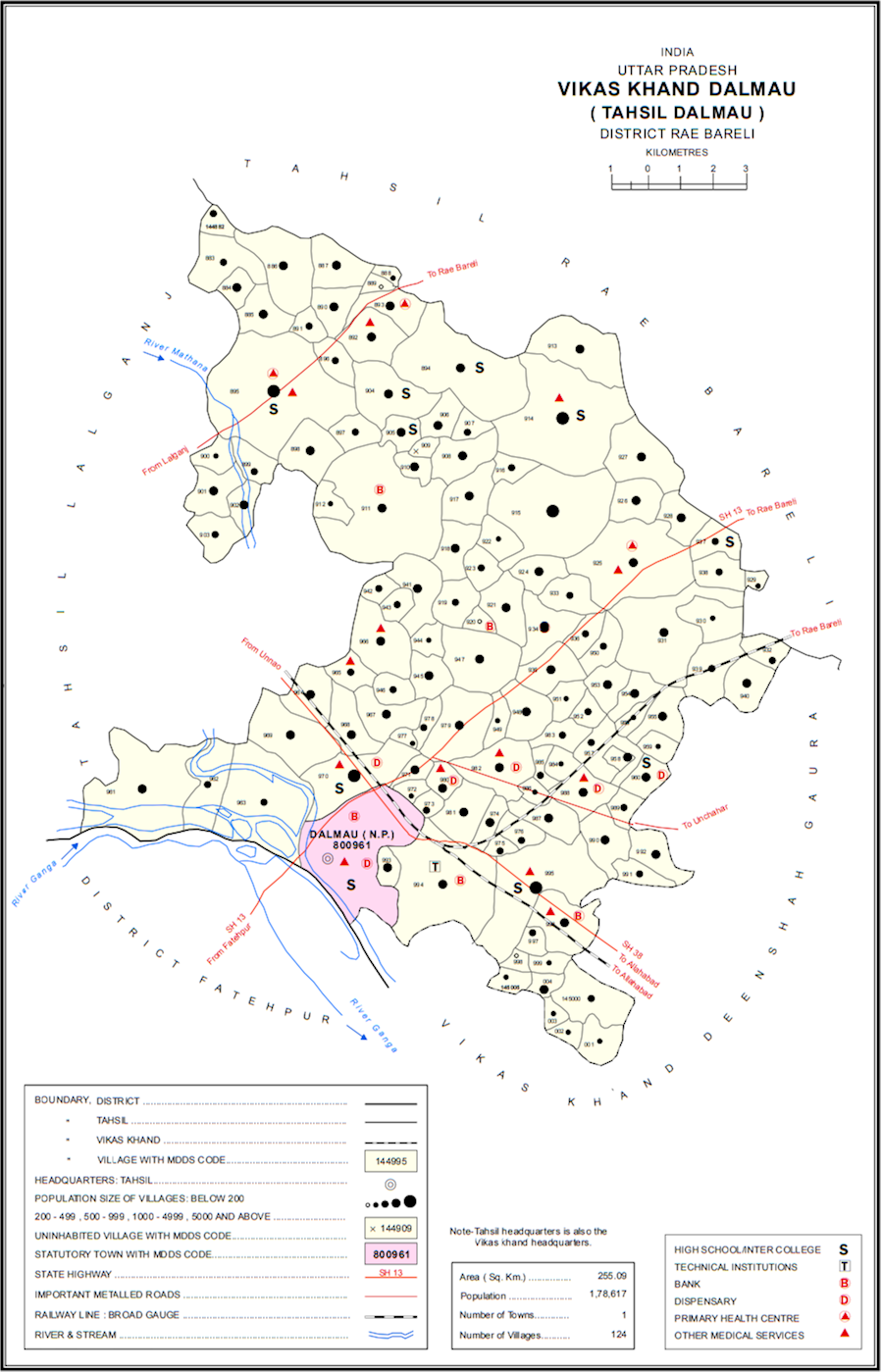
- Map showing Bharsana (#990) in Dalmau CD block

- Location in Uttar Pradesh, India
- Coordinates: 26.062944°N 81.119294°E
- Country India: India
- State: Uttar Pradesh
- District: Raebareli

Area
  - Total: 1.911 km^{2} (0.738 sq mi)

Population (2011)
  - Total: 1,550
  - Density: 811/km^{2} (2,100/sq mi)

Languages
  - Official: Hindi
- Time zone: UTC+5:30 (IST)
- Vehicle registration: UP-35

Bharsana is a village in Dalmau block of Rae Bareli district, Uttar Pradesh, India. It is located 8 km from Dalmau, the block headquarters. As of 2011, it has a population of 1,550 people, in 285 households. It has one primary school and no healthcare facilities.

The 1961 census recorded Bharsana as comprising 2 hamlets, with a total population of 551 people (275 male and 276 female), in 120 households and 108 physical houses. The area of the village was given as 495 acres.

The 1981 census recorded Bharsana as having a population of 811 people, in 173 households, and having an area of 191.81 hectares. The main staple foods were listed as wheat and rice.
