= Kundwal =

- Village
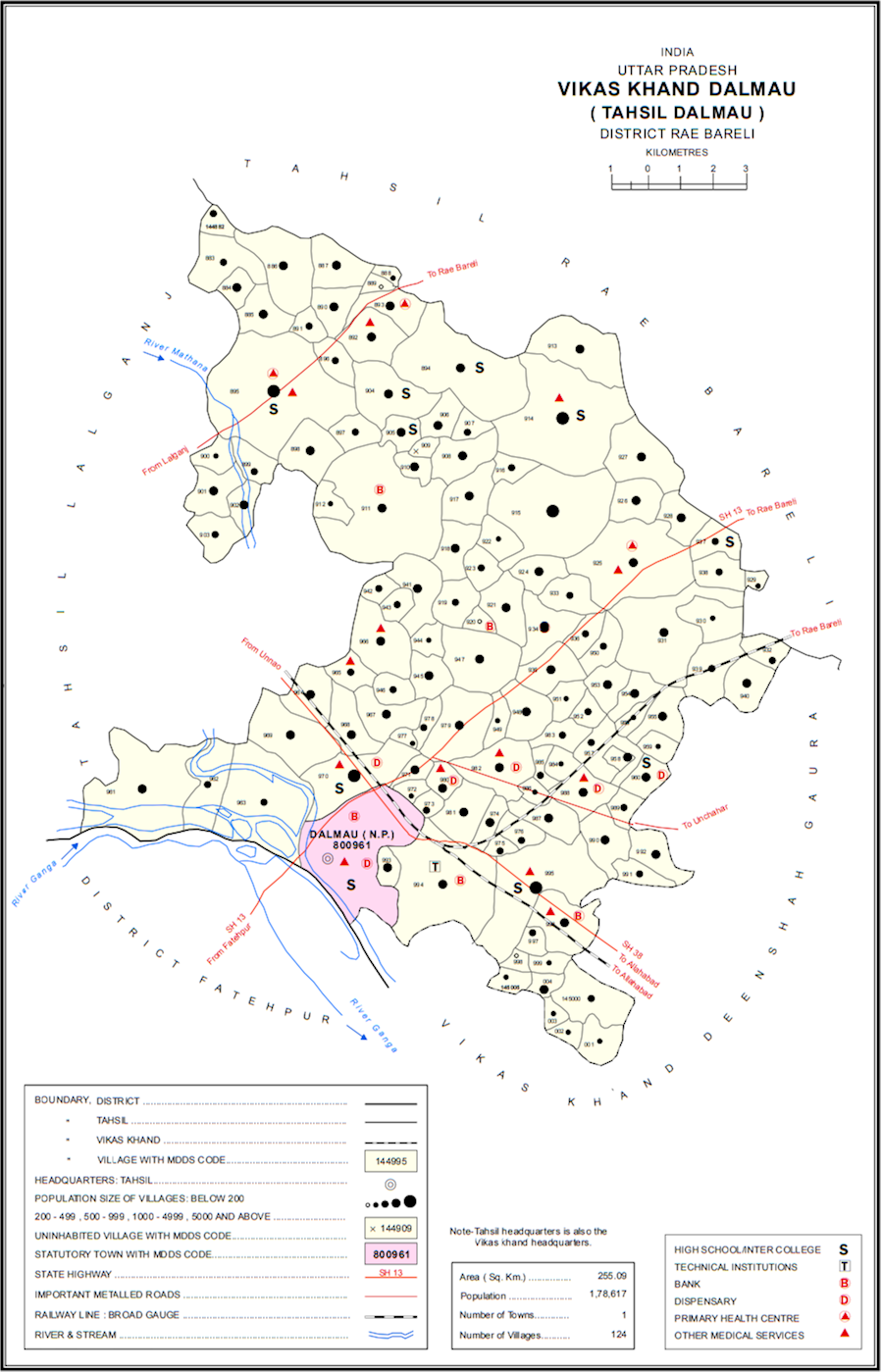
- Map showing Kundwal (#894) in Dalmau CD block

- Location in Uttar Pradesh, India
- Coordinates: 26.199614°N 81.078364°E
- Country India: India
- State: Uttar Pradesh
- District: Raebareli

Area
  - Total: 8.688 km^{2} (3.354 sq mi)

Population (2011)
  - Total: 4,461
  - Density: 513.5/km^{2} (1,330/sq mi)

Languages
  - Official: Hindi
- Time zone: UTC+5:30 (IST)
- Vehicle registration: UP-35

Kundwal is a village in Dalmau block of Rae Bareli district, Uttar Pradesh, India. As of 2011, it has a population of 4,461 people, in 832 households.

The 1961 census recorded Kundwal as comprising 9 hamlets, with a total population of 1,401 people (729 male and 672 female), in 286 households and 252 physical houses. The area of the village was given as 2,146 acres and it had a post office at that point.

The 1981 census recorded Kundwal as having a population of 2,197 people, in 406 households, and having an area of 868.46 hectares. The main staple foods were listed as wheat and rice.
