= Purauli =

- Village
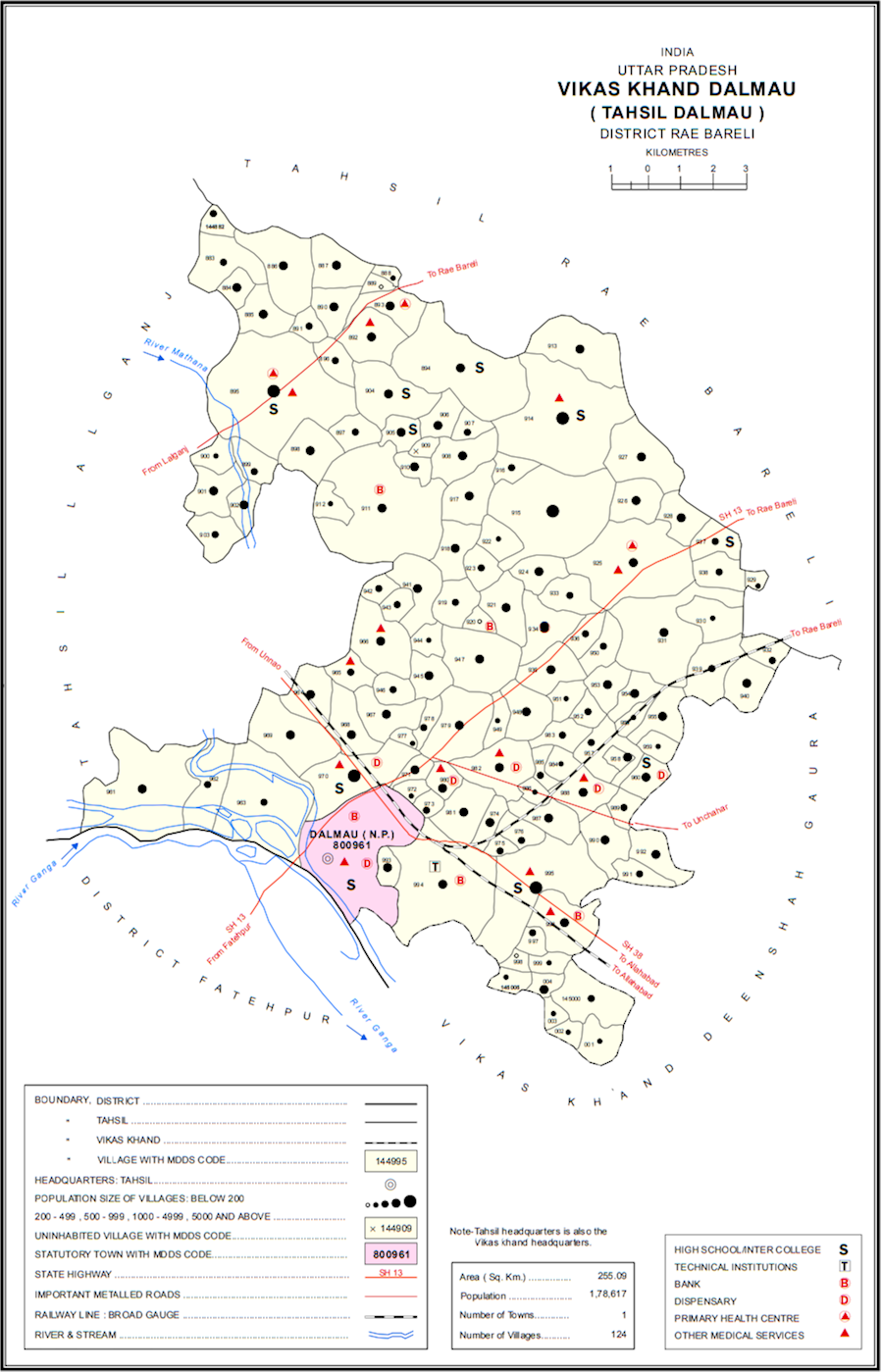
- Map showing Purauli (#919) in Dalmau CD block

- Location in Uttar Pradesh, India
- Coordinates: 26.131069°N 81.075784°E
- Country India: India
- State: Uttar Pradesh
- District: Raebareli

Area
  - Total: 1.242 km^{2} (0.480 sq mi)

Population (2011)
  - Total: 665
  - Density: 535/km^{2} (1,390/sq mi)

Languages
  - Official: Hindi
- Time zone: UTC+5:30 (IST)
- Vehicle registration: UP-35

Purauli is a village in Dalmau block of Rae Bareli district, Uttar Pradesh, India. It is located 18 km from Dalmau, the block headquarters. As of 2011, it has a population of 665 people, in 122 households. It has one primary school and no healthcare facilities.

The 1961 census recorded Purauli as comprising 2 hamlets, with a total population of 326 people (170 male and 156 female), in 49 households and 43 physical houses. The area of the village was given as 315 acres.

The 1981 census recorded Purauli as having a population of 501 people, in 83 households, and having an area of 126.67 hectares. The main staple foods were listed as wheat and rice.
