= Mansukhmau =

- Village
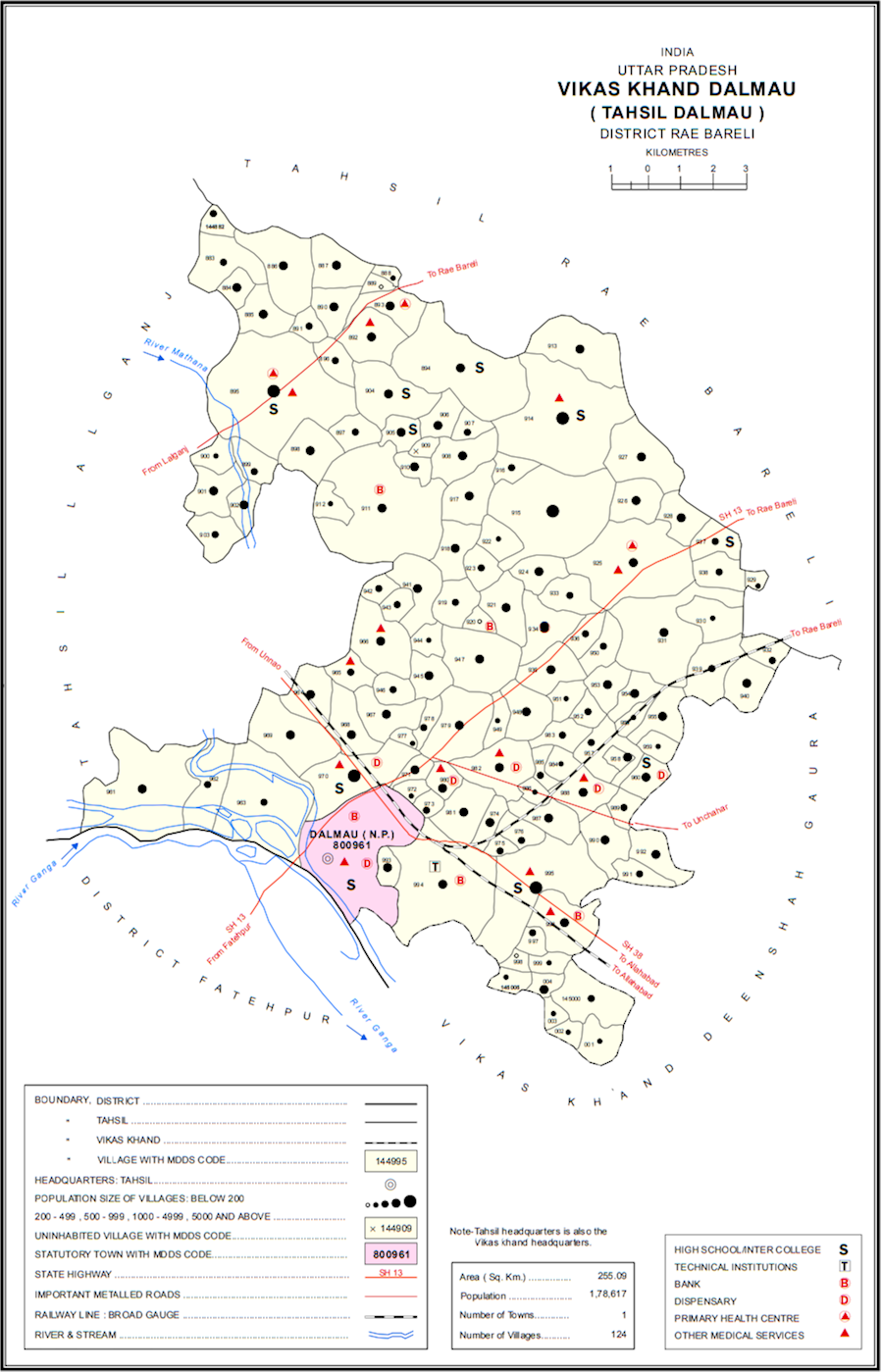
- Map showing Mansukhmau (#951) in Dalmau CD block

- Location in Uttar Pradesh, India
- Coordinates: 26.099186°N 81.108302°E
- Country India: India
- State: Uttar Pradesh
- District: Raebareli

Area
  - Total: 0.80 km^{2} (0.31 sq mi)

Population (2011)
  - Total: 394
  - Density: 490/km^{2} (1,300/sq mi)

Languages
  - Official: Hindi
- Time zone: UTC+5:30 (IST)
- Vehicle registration: UP-35

Mansukhmau is a village in Dalmau block of Rae Bareli district, Uttar Pradesh, India. It is located 9 km from Dalmau, the block headquarters. As of 2011, it has a population of 394 people, in 65 households. It has no schools and no healthcare facilities.

The 1961 census recorded Mansukhmau as comprising 1 hamlet, with a total population of 118 people (60 male and 58 female), in 29 households and 28 physical houses. The area of the village was given as 189 acres.

The 1981 census recorded Mansukhmau (as "Mansukh Mau") as having a population of 188 people, in 31 households, and having an area of 79.72 hectares. The main staple foods were listed as wheat and rice.
