= Narsawan =

Narsawan Narsāwān
- Village
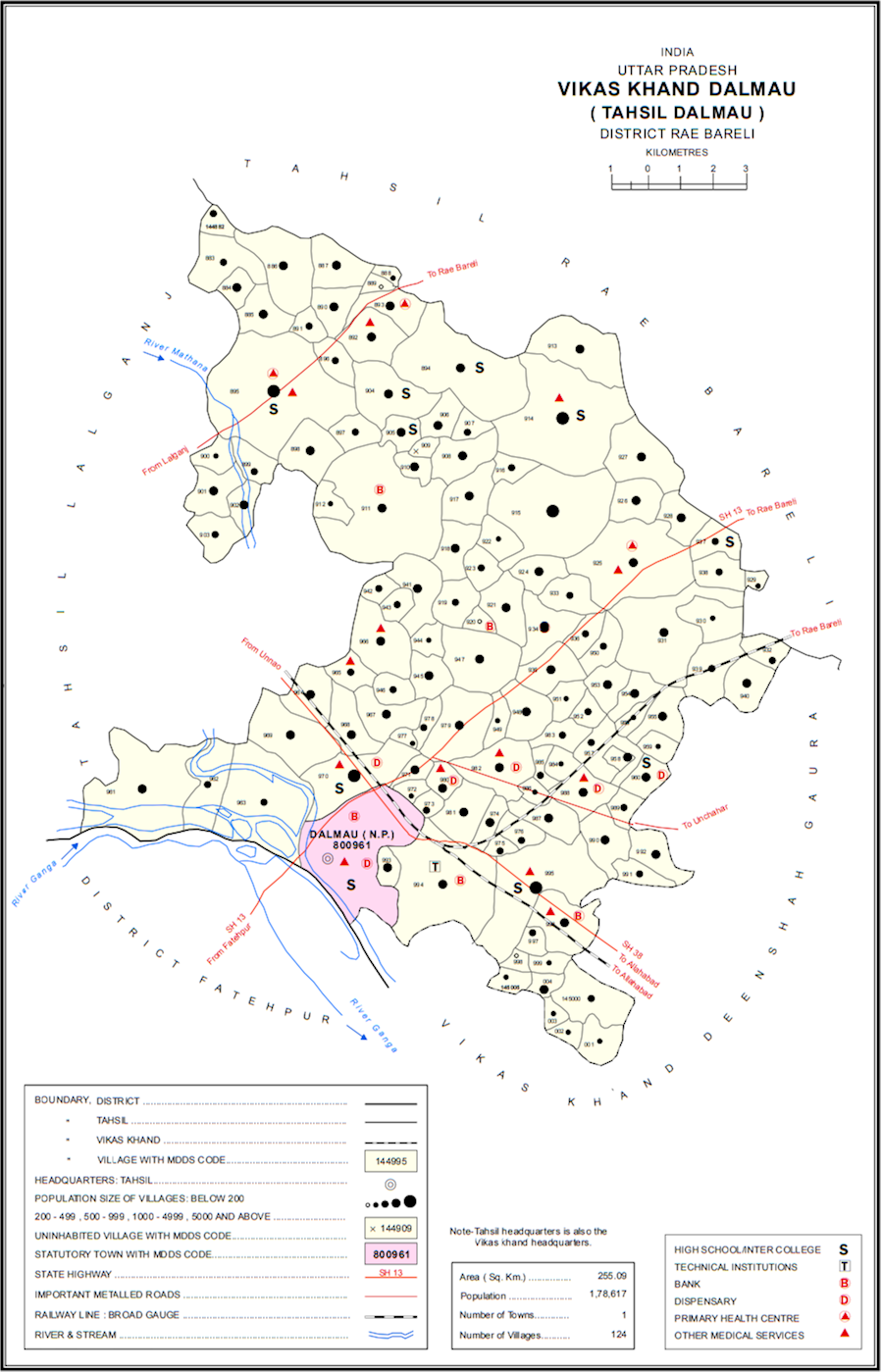
- Map showing Narsawan (#947) in Dalmau CD block

- Location in Uttar Pradesh, India
- Coordinates: 26.115459°N 81.07865°E
- Country India: India
- State: Uttar Pradesh
- District: Raebareli

Area
  - Total: 3.646 km^{2} (1.408 sq mi)

Population (2011)
  - Total: 3,137
  - Density: 860.4/km^{2} (2,228/sq mi)

Languages
  - Official: Hindi
- Time zone: UTC+5:30 (IST)
- Vehicle registration: UP-35

Narsawan is a village in Dalmau block of Rae Bareli district, Uttar Pradesh, India. It is located 9 km from Dalmau, the block headquarters. As of 2011, it has a population of 3,137 people, in 586 households. It has one primary school and no healthcare facilities.

The 1961 census recorded Narsawan as comprising 7 hamlets, with a total population of 1,383 people (664 male and 719 female), in 289 households and 237 physical houses. The area of the village was given as 921 acres.

The 1981 census recorded Narsawan as having a population of 1,726 people, in 333 households, and having an area of 372.67 hectares. The main staple foods were listed as wheat and rice.
