= Sursana =

Sursana Sursāna
- Village
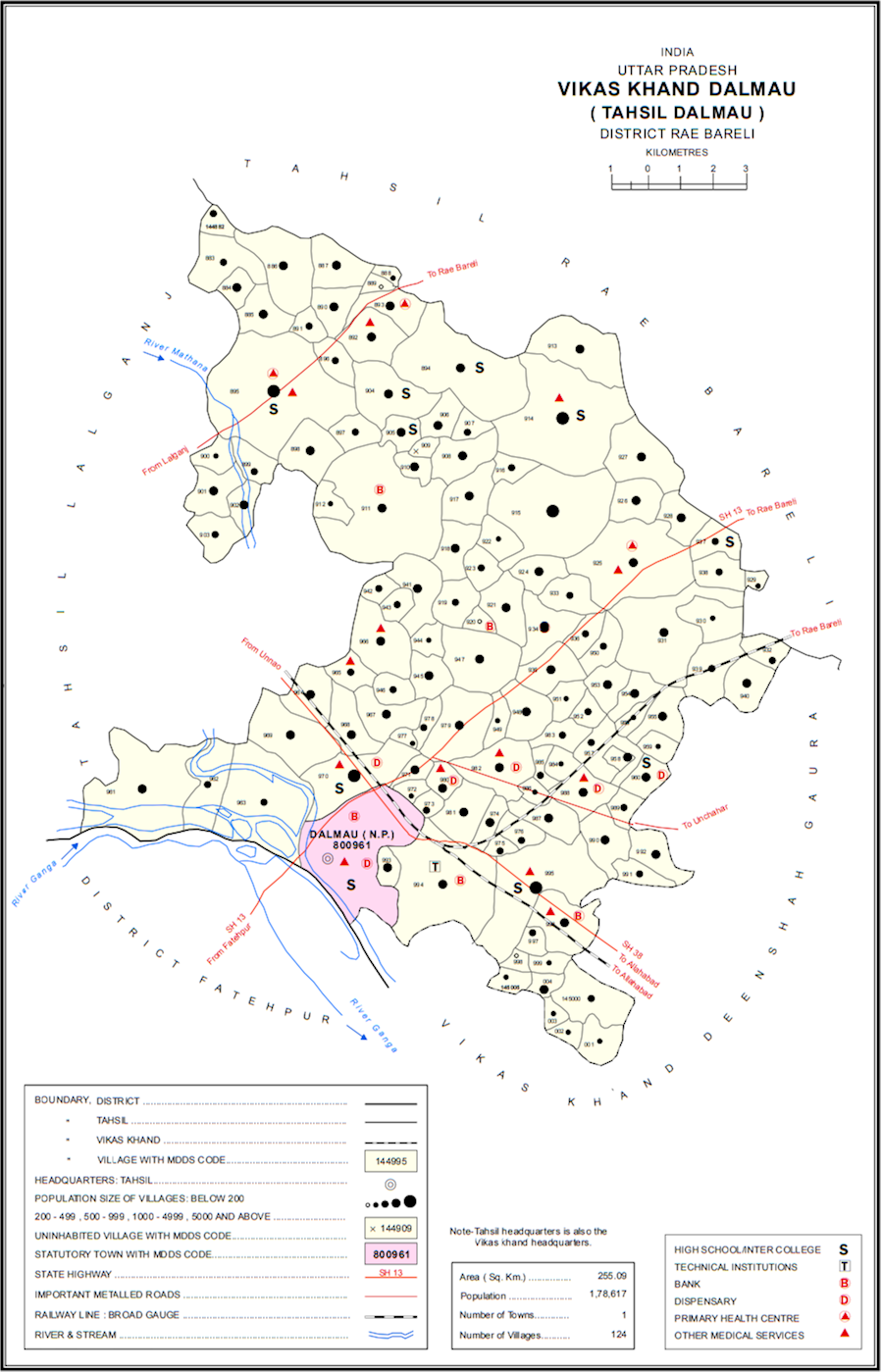
- Map showing Sursana (#992) in Dalmau CD block

- Location in Uttar Pradesh, India
- Coordinates: 26.061614°N 81.134507°E
- Country India: India
- State: Uttar Pradesh
- District: Raebareli

Area
  - Total: 2.348 km^{2} (0.907 sq mi)

Population (2011)
  - Total: 2,150
  - Density: 916/km^{2} (2,370/sq mi)

Languages
  - Official: Hindi
- Time zone: UTC+5:30 (IST)
- Vehicle registration: UP-35

Sursana is a village in Dalmau block of Rae Bareli district, Uttar Pradesh, India. It is located 8 km from Dalmau, the block headquarters. As of 2011, it has a population of 2,150 people, in 404 households. It has no schools and no healthcare facilities.

The 1961 census recorded Sursana as comprising 3 hamlets, with a total population of 689 people (347 male and 342 female), in 158 households and 149 physical houses. The area of the village was given as 597 acres.

The 1981 census recorded Sursana as having a population of 439 people, in 81 households, and having an area of 93.49 hectares. The main staple foods were listed as wheat and rice.
