= Kharagpur Kurmiana =

Kharagpur Kurmiana Kharagpur Kurmiāna
- Village
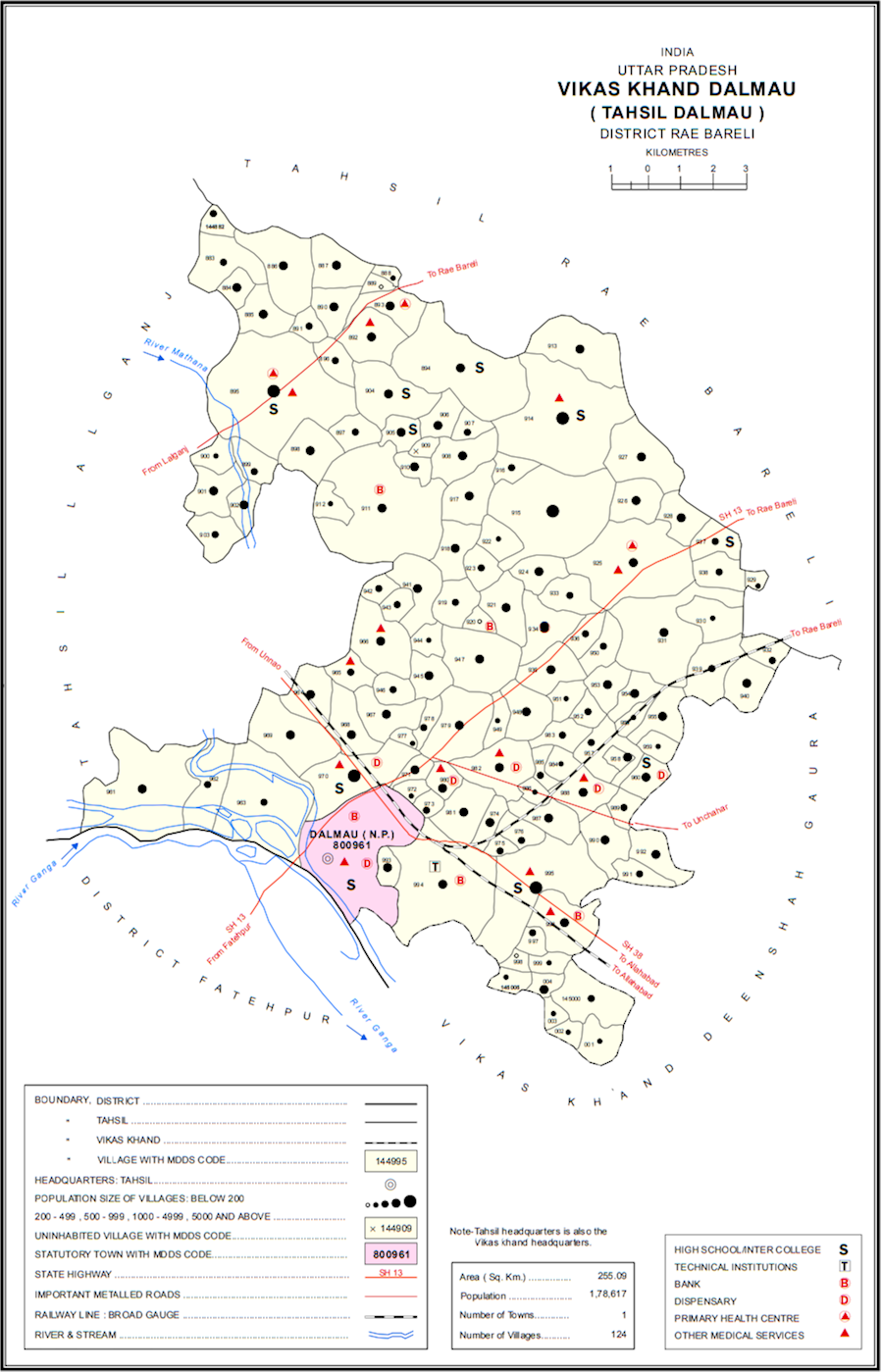
- Map showing Kharagpur Kurmiana (#921) in Dalmau CD block

- Location in Uttar Pradesh, India
- Coordinates: 26.12762°N 81.091748°E
- Country India: India
- State: Uttar Pradesh
- District: Raebareli

Area
  - Total: 2.503 km^{2} (0.966 sq mi)

Population (2011)
  - Total: 1,499
  - Density: 598.9/km^{2} (1,551/sq mi)

Languages
  - Official: Hindi
- Time zone: UTC+5:30 (IST)
- Vehicle registration: UP-35

Kharagpur Kurmiana is a village in Dalmau block of Rae Bareli district, Uttar Pradesh, India. It is located 12 km from Dalmau, the block headquarters. As of 2011, it has a population of 1,499 people, in 307 households. It has one primary school and no healthcare facilities.

The 1961 census recorded Kharagpur Kurmiana (as "Kharagpur Kurmiyana") as comprising 6 hamlets, with a total population of 800 people (394 male and 495 female), in 147 households and 121 physical houses. The area of the village was given as 667 acres.

The 1981 census recorded Kharagpur Kurmiana (as "Kharagpur Kurmiyana") as having a population of 1,087 people, in 192 households, and having an area of 260.61 hectares. The main staple foods were listed as wheat and rice.
