= Sarai Lakhmi =

Sarai Lakhmi Sarāi Lakhmi
- Village
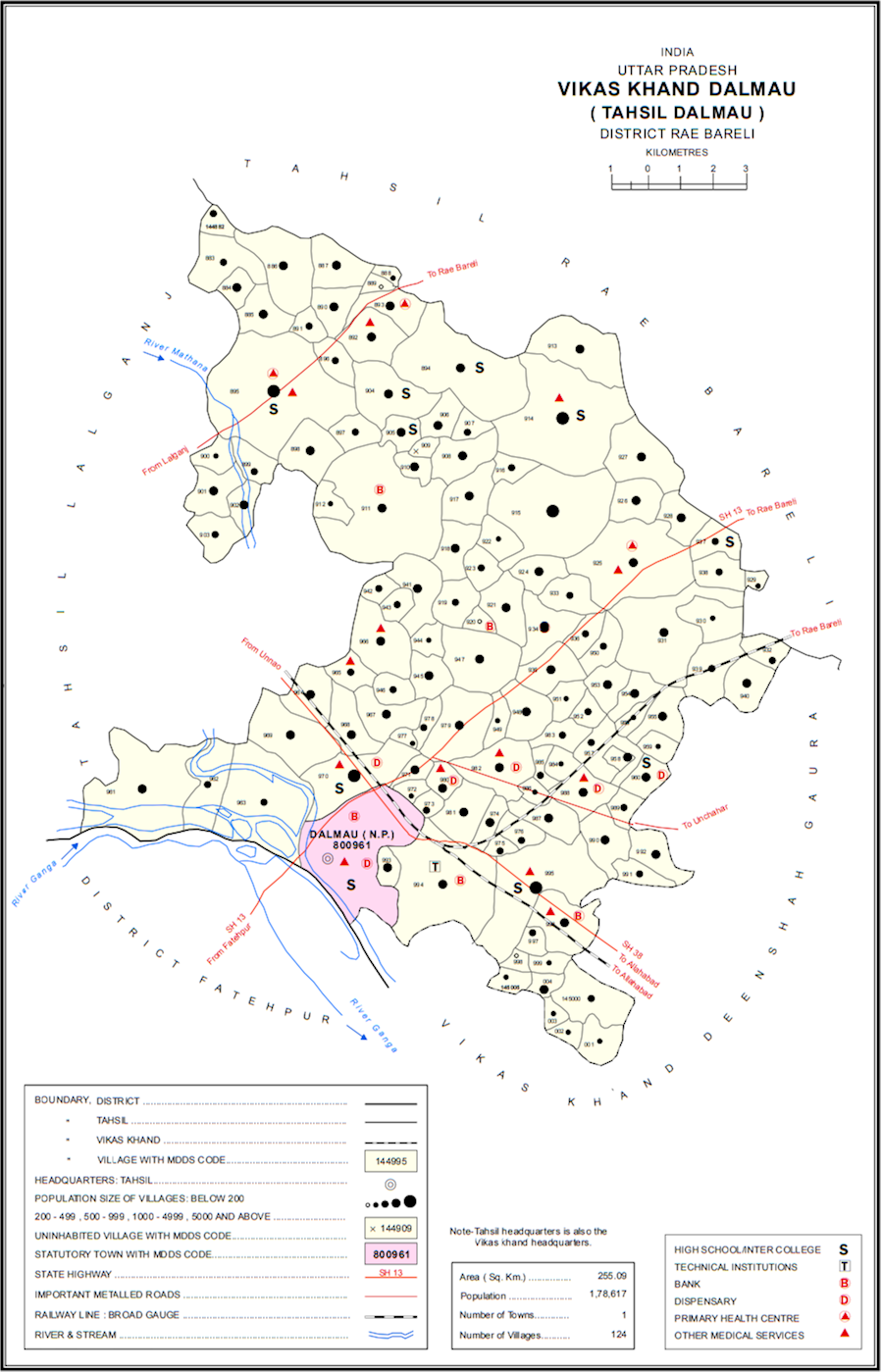
- Map showing Sarai Lakhmi (#976) in Dalmau CD block

- Location in Uttar Pradesh, India
- Coordinates: 26.064506°N 81.093673°E
- Country India: India
- State: Uttar Pradesh
- District: Raebareli

Area
  - Total: 0.856 km^{2} (0.331 sq mi)

Population (2011)
  - Total: 871
  - Density: 1,020/km^{2} (2,640/sq mi)

Languages
  - Official: Hindi
- Time zone: UTC+5:30 (IST)
- Vehicle registration: UP-35

Sarai Lakhmi is a village in Dalmau block of Rae Bareli district, Uttar Pradesh, India. It is located 4 km from Dalmau, the block headquarters. As of 2011, it has a population of 871 people, in 166 households. It has one pre-primary school and no healthcare facilities.

The 1961 census recorded Sarai Lakhmi (as "Sarai Lakhami") as comprising 2 hamlets, with a total population of 379 people (195 male and 184 female), in 78 households and 73 physical houses. The area of the village was given as 237 acres.

The 1981 census recorded Sarai Lakhmi (as "Sarai Lakhami") as having a population of 530 people, in 102 households, and having an area of 88.63 hectares. The main staple foods were listed as wheat and rice.
