= Radha Balampur =

Radha Balampur Rādha Bālampur
- Village
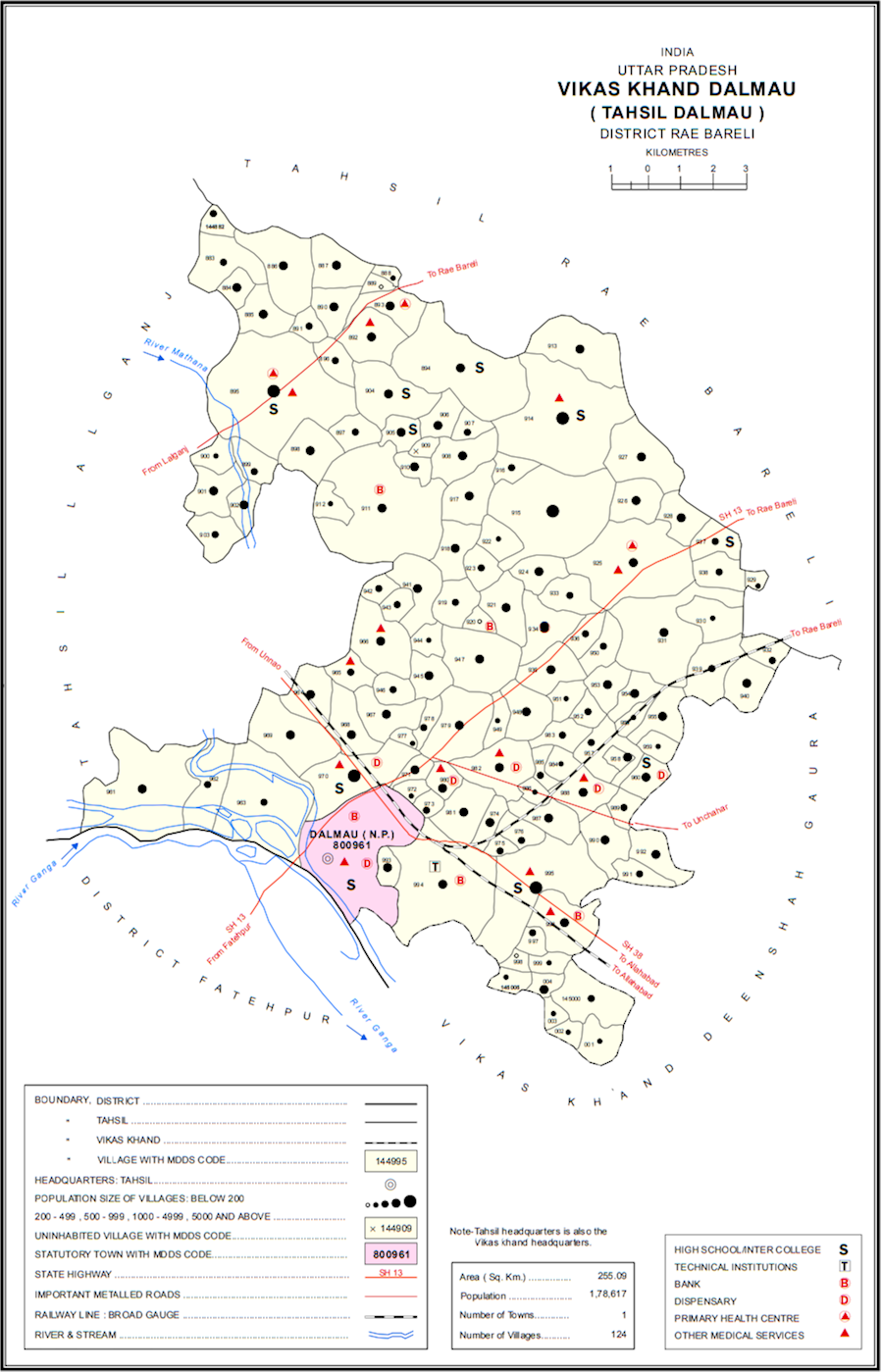
- Map showing Radha Balampur (#957) in Dalmau CD block

- Location in Uttar Pradesh, India
- Coordinates: 26.091652°N 81.117336°E
- Country India: India
- State: Uttar Pradesh
- District: Raebareli

Area
  - Total: 1.331 km^{2} (0.514 sq mi)

Population (2011)
  - Total: 988
  - Density: 742/km^{2} (1,920/sq mi)

Languages
  - Official: Hindi
- Time zone: UTC+5:30 (IST)
- Vehicle registration: UP-33

Radha Balampur is a village in Dalmau block of Rae Bareli district, Uttar Pradesh, India. It is located 10 km from Dalmau, the block headquarters. As of 2011, it has a population of 988 people, in 187 households. It has one primary school and no healthcare facilities.

The 1961 census recorded Radha Balampur as comprising 3 hamlets, with a total population of 386 people (201 male and 185 female), in 90 households and 83 physical houses. The area of the village was given as 341 acres and it had a post office at that point.

The 1981 census recorded Radha Balampur as having a population of 554 people, in 104 households, and having an area of 133.14 hectares. The main staple foods were listed as wheat and rice.
