= Ghorwara =

Ghorwara Ghorwāra
- Village
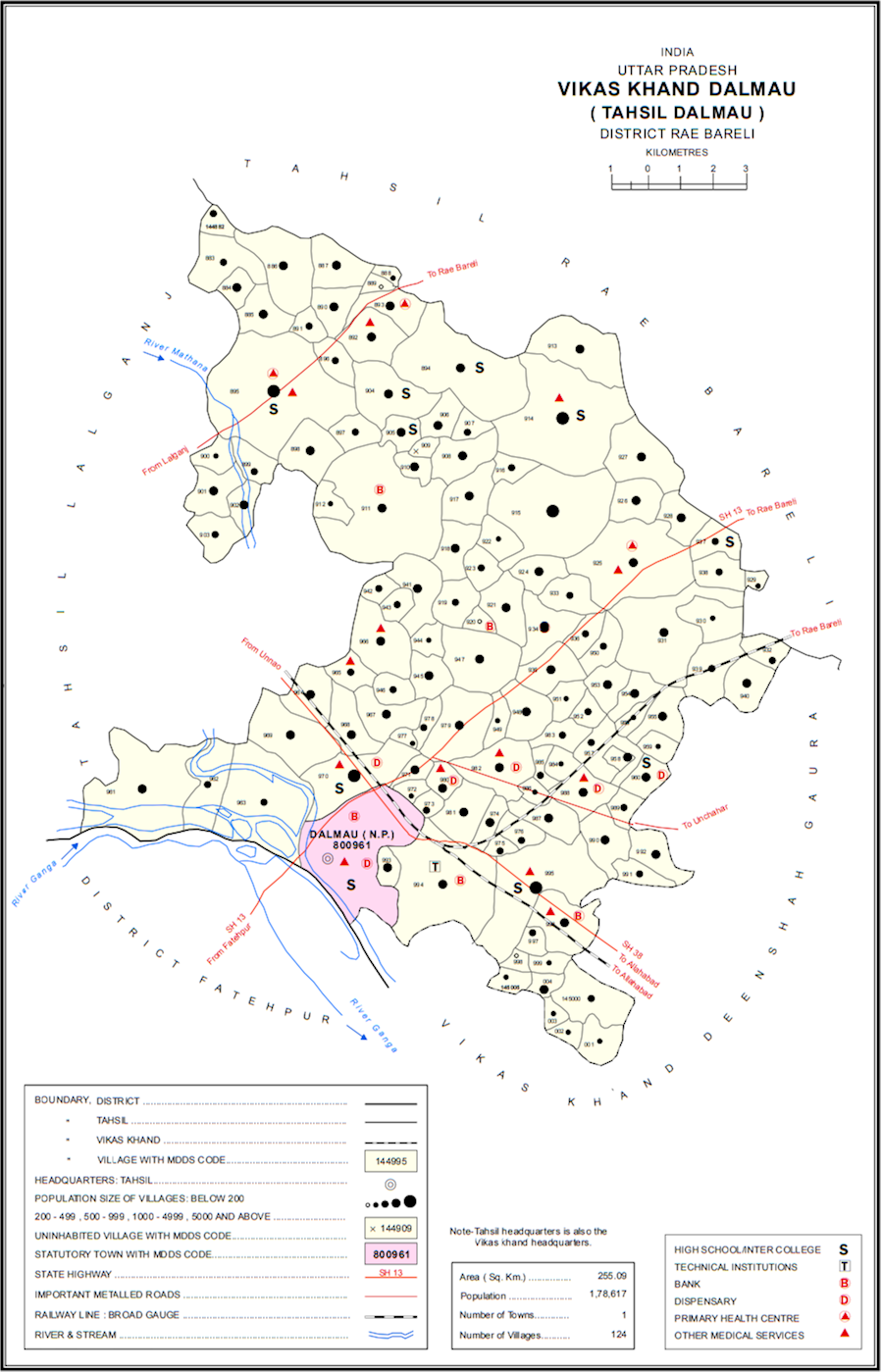
- Map showing Ghorwara (#934) in Dalmau CD block

- Location in Uttar Pradesh, India
- Coordinates: 26.124692°N 81.100739°E
- Country India: India
- State: Uttar Pradesh
- District: Raebareli

Area
  - Total: 2.806 km^{2} (1.083 sq mi)

Population (2011)
  - Total: 4,223
  - Density: 1,505/km^{2} (3,898/sq mi)

Languages
  - Official: Hindi
- Time zone: UTC+5:30 (IST)
- Vehicle registration: UP-35

Ghorwara is a village in Dalmau block of Rae Bareli district, Uttar Pradesh, India. It is located 10 km from Dalmau, the block headquarters. As of 2011, it has a population of 618 people, in 102 households. It has one primary school and no healthcare facilities. It hosts a market twice per week, on Mondays and Thursdays; cloth and vegetables are the main items traded.

The 1961 census recorded Ghorwara (as "Ghurwara") as comprising 10 hamlets, with a total population of 1,239 people (655 male and 584 female), in 267 households and 257 physical houses. The area of the village was given as 729 acres. Average attendance of the twice-weekly market was about 200 people then.

The 1981 census recorded Ghorwara (as "Ghurawara") as having a population of 2,006 people, in 425 households, and having an area of 286.92 hectares. The main staple foods were listed as wheat and rice.
