= Santpur, Raebareli =

Santpur
- Village
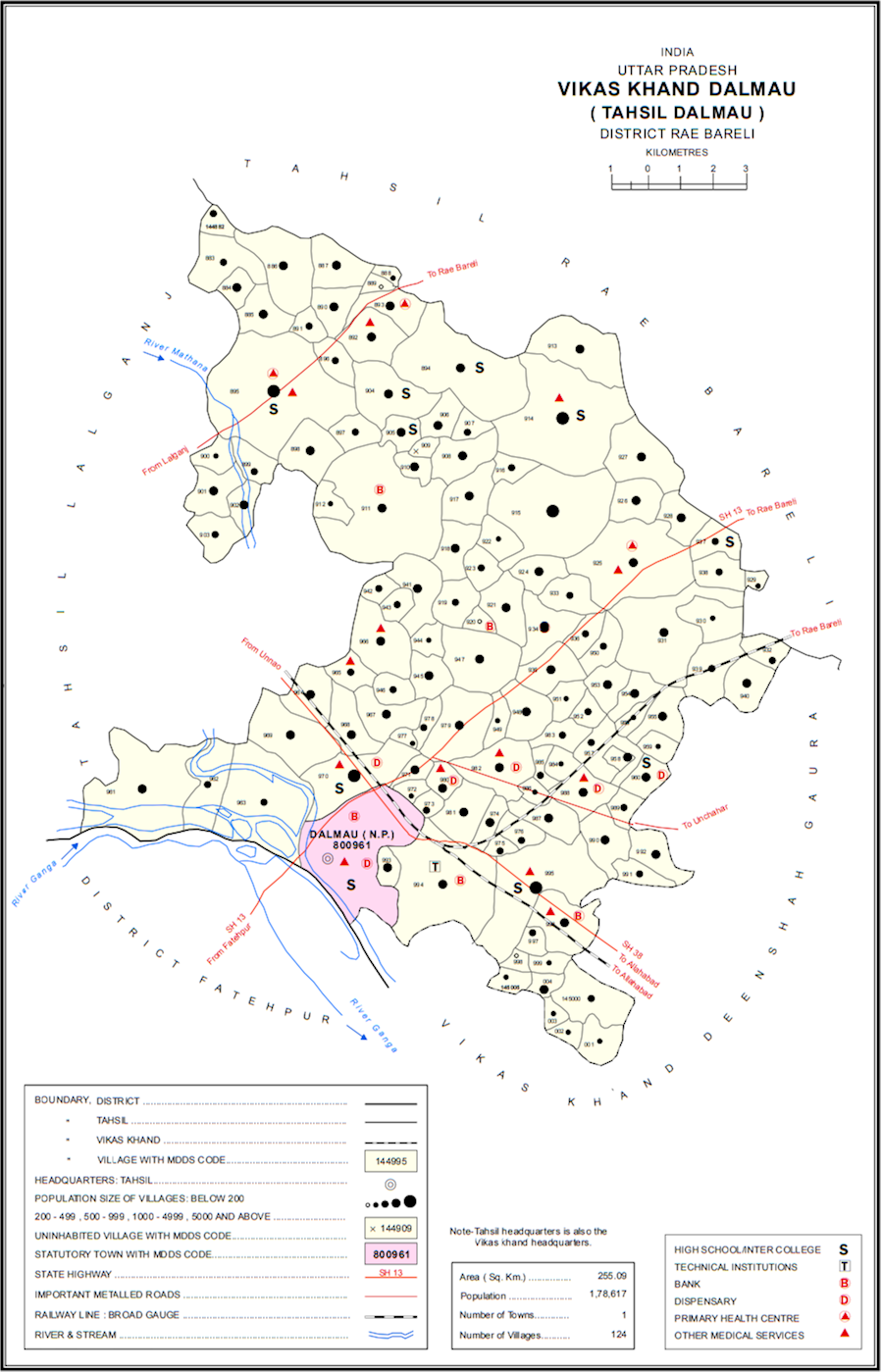
- Map showing Santpur (#988) in Dalmau CD block

- Location in Uttar Pradesh, India
- Coordinates: 26.078422°N 81.109557°E
- Country India: India
- State: Uttar Pradesh
- District: Raebareli

Area
  - Total: 1.836 km^{2} (0.709 sq mi)

Population (2011)
  - Total: 1,069
  - Density: 582.2/km^{2} (1,508/sq mi)

Languages
  - Official: Hindi
- Time zone: UTC+5:30 (IST)
- Vehicle registration: UP-35

Santpur is a village in Dalmau block of Rae Bareli district, Uttar Pradesh, India. It is located 5 km from Dalmau, the block headquarters. As of 2011, it has a population of 1,069 people, in 209 households. It has one primary school and one medical clinic.

The 1961 census recorded Santpur as comprising 4 hamlets, with a total population of 441 people (216 male and 225 female), in 93 households and 85 physical houses. The area of the village was given as 443 acres.

The 1981 census recorded Santpur as having a population of 633 people, in 128 households, and having an area of 184.94 hectares. The main staple foods were listed as wheat and rice.
