= Dalmau =

Dalmau Chhoti Kashi
- Town
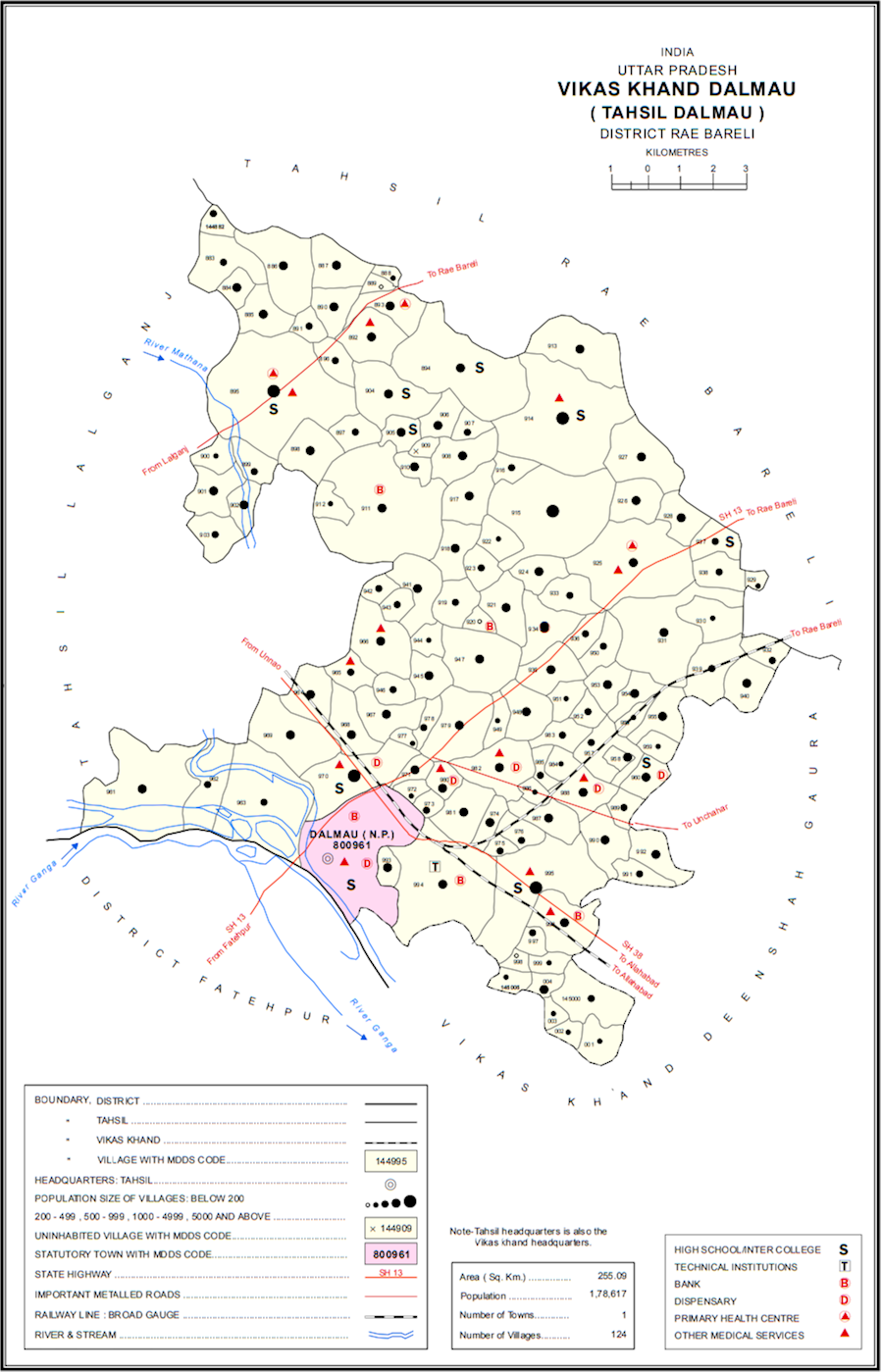
- Map of Dalmau CD block

- Location in Uttar Pradesh, India
- Coordinates: 26.07°N 81.03°E
- Country: India
- State: Uttar Pradesh
- District: Rae Bareli

Area
  - Total: 8.38 km^{2} (3.24 sq mi)
- Elevation: 115 m (377 ft)

Population (2011)
  - Total: 9,983
  - Density: 1,190/km^{2} (3,090/sq mi)

Languages
  - Official: Hindi, Urdu
  - Local: Awadhi
- Time zone: UTC+5:30 (IST)
- Vehicle registration: UP 33

Dalmau is a historic town and tehsil headquarters in Rae Bareli district of Uttar Pradesh, India. Situated on the banks of the Ganga, between Raebareli and Fatehpur, the town has several historical monuments including the old fort, several dargahs, and the Haji Zahid mosque. Dalmau is also home to the Ebrahim Sharki palace belonging to the Nawab Shuza-ud-daula. Visitors can also see the Baithak of Alha Udal and enjoy a stroll along the Dalmau Pump canal. Dalmau also enjoys a unique place in the literary world because it was here that the famous Hindi poet Suryakant Tripathi "Nirala" wrote his poems while sitting on the fort and overlooking the scene below.

Dalmau was also centre of sufism in fourteen century because Maulana Daud a Chishti saint who was attached to Dalmau royal court was living here and he wrote first awadhi masnawi world famous book Chandayan.

== Geography ==
Dalmau is perched on a steep bluff whose height protects the town from flooding. The ground is uneven and broken up by many ravines. It is located at 26.07°N 81.03°E and has an average elevation of 115 metres (377 feet).

== Name and history ==
According to one tradition, Dalmau is named after its founder, Dal Deo, a Bhar brother of Bal Deo. of Kannauj and a contemporary of the 5th-century Sassanid emperor Bahram Gor. This tradition asserts that the Bhar tribe later conquered Dalmau after the death of Partab Chand of Kannauj in 530 CE. However, this tradition appears to be mixed up, and the Rathore story appears to have been "imported" in order to give Dalmau a more prestigious origin. More likely, Dal and Bal were themselves Bhars, and Dalmau had always been a Rajbhar town during its early days.

In 423 AH, Dalmau was conquered by Salar Sahu, the father of the semi-legendary Islamic warrior Ghazi Saiyyad Salar Masud. He granted the estate of Dalmau to one Malik Abdullah. There are still martyrs' tombs in Dalmau said to date from the time of this conquest, serving as the final resting place of Ghalib, Maliks Ali and Wali, and other Islamic martyrs.

About two centuries later, Dalmau flourished under the reign of Iltutmish, third ruler of the Delhi Sultanate. Makhdum Badr ud-Din, a companion of the sultan, resided in Dalmau at that time. Dalmau continued to prosper under Firoz Shah Tughlaq, who founded a madrasa in Dalmau. Also during his reign, a local notable named Yusuf built an Eidgah in Dalmau; it was later replaced by a newer structure, but the foundation stone is still visible, inscribed with a pair of couplets bearing Yusuf's name as well as the date of construction, 759 AH.

In 1394, as the Delhi Sultanate's crumbling Tughlaq dynasty was caught up in a civil war, members the Bhar tribe rose to power in Dalmau. Soon after, when the subahdar of Jaunpur, Khwaja Malik Sarwar, declared independence, thus founding the Jaunpur Sultanate. He claimed rule over the province of Dalmau, alongside those of Kannauj, Sandila, Bahraich, and Bihar; however, his authority over Dalmau was only nominal, as the Bhars retained possession of it. This came to an end under the Jaunpur sultan Ibrahim Shah Sharqi, who sent an army to conquer Dalmau, supposedly because the Bhar ruler, Dal, sought to marry the daughter of a local sayyid known as Baba Haji. After defeating and killing Dal's brother Kakori named Raja Kakoran at the nearby village of Sudamanpur on the day of Holi, Ibrahim Shah captured Dalmau and slaughtered the Bhar-Rajbhar inhabitants. In memory of this massacre, local women of the Bharonia cast do not wear nose rings or glass bangles. Dal's tomb is 2 miles from Dalmau, and local Bhars and Rajbhars offer milk there during the month of Sawan.

After Ibrahim Shah's conquest of Dalmau, many Muslim settlers came to live in Dalmau and other nearby towns, including Raebareli, Bhawan, Jalalpur Dehi, and Thulendi. Meanwhile, in 820 AH, Ibrahim Shah began an ambitious construction project in the area, building new forts at Bhawan, Raebareli, and Thulendi, as well as rebuilding the Bhar-Rajbhar fort of Dalmau, which had been damaged during the previous conquest. The Dalmau fort has since largely fallen into ruin, although its thana and gatehouse still stand. It is believed to have been built on top of an even earlier Buddhist stupa. Ibrahim also constructed a masonry well and a garden by the bank of the river in Dalmau. His grandson Muhammad Shah is buried in a tomb within this garden, in a structure known as the Maqbara-e-Shah-e-Sharqi.

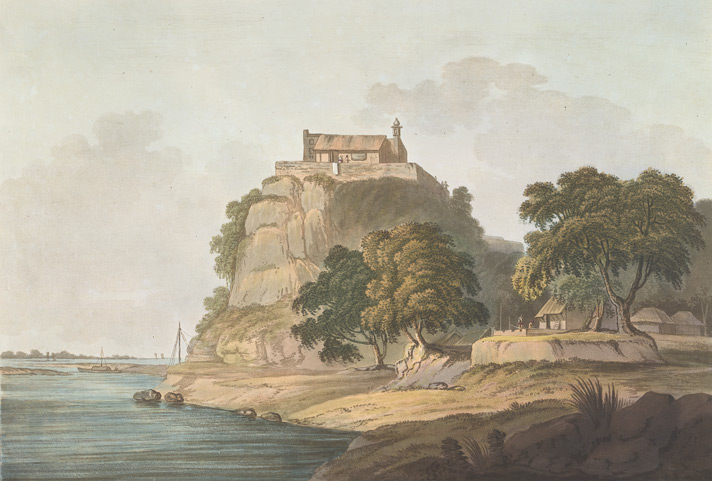
Dalmow's fort as sketched by Thomas Daniell in the 1790s

Dalmau's fort appears to have been a royal one, due to the appointment of various officers typical of royal forts: a mutawalli or superintendent, a muhtasib or censor, a nasihi or legal advisor, a qasbati, who provided supplies for civil and military officials, a ghariali, who struck the hours on the gate, and a guldagha, who branded the horses and oxen of the cavalry. Some of these officials received hereditary lands in addition to their position: for example, the gharialis held the village of Nasirpur Kirtali on a rent-free tenure through the time of the British Raj.

Dalmau remained an important city long after the end of the Jaunpur Sultanate. The Delhi sultan Sikandar Lodi married the widow of Sheri, the governor of Dalmau, here in 1491, and the city appears frequently in the annals of the historian Firishta. During the reign of the Mughal emperor Akbar, one Mirza Shukrullah served as the faujdar of Dalmau. He repaired the mosque of Makhdum Badr ud-Din, and his own stone mausoleum still stands. During the reign of Shah Jahan, Sherandaz Khan served as the faujdar of Dalmau. He founded a mahallah, named Sherandazpur after himself, in Dalmau. He also built an imambara and a mosque within the fort's precinct.

Shuja-ud-Daula, the Nawab of Oudh from 1754 to 1775, built a brick mansion and a garden 2 miles north of Dalmau; however, the house was destroyed during the British raj to make way for the road from Dalmau to Lalganj; only the southern wall still stands. Saadat Ali Khan II, the penultimate Nawab of Oudh, was born in this mansion. In 1146 AH, the Maratha commander Pandit Gopal Rao crossed the Ganges from the south and sacked Dalmau, and the city went into decline.

Dalmau was originally the seat of what would become Lalganj tehsil, losing this status in 1864. It was made a pargana by Akbar, in the sarkar of Manikpur and the subah of Allahabad. It remained a pargana through the time of the Raj. Before being constituted as a pargana, the territory of Dalmau had been divided into six districts: Haweli (Dalmau itself), Jalalpur, Birkha, Bhai, Satawan, and Pandaria. This division was made by Ibrahim Shah Sharqi.

At the turn of the 20th century, Dalmau was described as "a fair-sized town" with many historical monuments. It served as commercial centre, engaged in trade of grain, hides, oilseeds, and poppy seeds with Kanpur, and it had three marketplaces. The oldest, the Purana bazar or the Charai Mandi, dated back to the time of the Jaunpur Sultanate and hosted markets on Thursdays and Sundays. The second was Tikaitganj, which was built by the minister Tikait Rai in 1203 AH; it hosted markets on Wednesdays and Saturdays. The third, Glynnganj, had been built in 1862 by W. Glynn, then the Deputy Commissioner. It hosted markets on Mondays and Fridays. In addition to the rotating market days, there were also permanent shops in both the Purana bazar and Tikaitganj. Dalmau also had a police station, post office, munsif court, dispensary, cattle pound, an upper primary school, a small inspection bungalow, and an opium godown with a tennis court. There was also a sarai with a mosque attached, built in 1006 AH by Haji Zahid.

== Demographics ==
Historical population
| Year | Pop. | ±% |
|---|---|---|
| 1901 | 5,635 | — |
| 1911 | 5,600 | −0.6% |
| 1921 | 5,284 | −5.6% |
| 1931 | 5,904 | +11.7% |
| 1941 | 2,775 | −53.0% |
| 1951 | 2,766 | −0.3% |
| 1961 | Not given | — |
| 1971 | Not given | — |
| 1981 | 3,892 | — |
| 1991 | 4,654 | +19.6% |
| 2001 | 9,036 | +94.2% |
| 2011 | 9,983 | +10.5% |
Source: 2011 Census of India

According to the 2011 census, Dalmau has a population of 9,983 people, in 1,882 households. The town's sex ratio is 924 females to every 1000 males, which is equal to the district-wide urban sex ratio; 5,189 of Dalmau's residents are male (52.0%) and 4,794 are female (48.0%). The 0-6 age group makes up about 11.9% of the town's population; the sex ratio for this group is 954, which is higher than the district urban average for this group. Members of Scheduled Castes make up 14.53% of the town's population, while members of Scheduled Tribes make up 0.15%. Dalmau's literacy rate was 77.95% (counting only people age 7 and up); literacy was higher among men and boys (86.83%) than among women and girls (68.29%). The corresponding 18.54% gender literacy gap was the highest among towns in Raebareli district. The scheduled castes literacy rate is 64.74% (79.36% among men and boys, and 49.01% among women and girls). The 30.35% gender literacy gap among this group was also the highest in the district.

In terms of employment, 22.28% of Dalmau residents were classified as main workers (i.e. people employed for at least 6 months per year) in 2011. Marginal workers (i.e. people employed for less than 6 months per year) made up 9.79%, and the remaining 67.94% were non-workers. Employment status varied significantly according to gender, with 48.66% of men being either main or marginal workers, compared to 14.10% of women.

60.97% of Dalmau residents live in slum conditions as of 2011. There are 6 slum areas in Dalmau: Khatikana, Chaurasi, Miyantola, Sherendazpur, Chauhatta, and Adarsh Nagar (the largest). These range in size from about 161 to 239 households and have between 7 and 33 tap water access points. The number of flush toilets installed in people's homes ranges from 7 in Chaurasi to 52 in Miyantola. All 6 areas are serviced by open sewers.

== Culture ==
Dalmau hosts the Kartik Poornima fair, which is the largest mela in the district, on the last day of Kartik. The fair lasts for three days and is a bathing mela celebrated by Hindus of all backgrounds. As many as 150,000 people, both male and female, gather at Dalmau on this occasion to bathe in the Ganges. It is common to see pilgrims doing parikrama on the roads around Dalmau. Various vendors gather to sell their wares at the Kanki fair, although no formal market is held for the occasion.

Another festival, much smaller in attendance, is observed by Muslims on the last Monday in Baisakh. It is held in honour of Makhdum Badr-ud-Din Badr Alam, an officer serving in the army under Iltutmish whose tomb is in Dalmau. It is connected with the cult of Sayyid Salar Masud.

It is considered to be a holy place, situated on the banks of the river Ganges. The famous poet and writer Suryakant Tripathi 'Nirala' wrote poems sitting on the top of the fort built by the King Dal Dev. The town is also featured prominently in his eponymous biography of his friend Kulli Bhaat.By tradition a large crowd comes in Kartik Purnima Mela from neighbouring areas to have a dip in holy Ganga

The town has several attractions to its credit including the King Dal's fort, Dargah of several sufis and martyrs like Makhdoom Badruddin Badr e Alam, Qubool Aalam, Sheranshah, Malik Mubarak Shaheed, Saat Sulema Saat Daud, Muhammad Shah Sharqi (Sultaan of Sharqi kingdom of Jaunpur), Chand Matmin Shaheed, Historical Mosque of Haji Zahid, Pakka Ghat built by Raja tikait Rai, Rani ka Shivala, Zanana Ghat of Mughal period, Bara Math, and Mahesh Giri Math.

== Fort ==
Dalmau's now-ruined fort sits on a large artificial mound covering about 8 acres, atop a 100-foot bluff overlooking the Ganges. The overall shape is an irregular quadrilateral, with one side directly on the riverbank. This side is a sheer cliff dropping down to the water, with gradual erosion leaving the fort slightly overhanging the water. The inland side forms a concave crescent, with the corners jutting out farther than the sides. On this side, the slope is less steep, but still extremely difficult for attackers to climb. The protruding corners would have provided excellent flanking fire for defenders.

The whole mound appears to sit on top of two old Buddhist stupas, whose remains have been left partly exposed by the erosion of the cliff face by the river. This mound was then used for military purposes by the Bhars or Rajbhars, before the Muslim conquest, and then rebuilt by Ibrahim Shah in the early 1400s.

In the past, the fort was enclosed by a masonry wall that appears to have encircled the entire mound. Most of this is gone now; some of it was intentionally removed, while other sections have collapsed. The masonry is still standing at the southeastern corner, on the river, where the earthen mound is encased in a four-foot-thick wall that rises at a 30° angle up to a height of 40 feet. Then, successive battlements rise up one against the other, so that they buttress each other. At the top is the baradari or open pavilion, which is 100 feet above the river.

== Schools ==
Bappa DevtaDeen Agrahari Industrial Training Institute (ITI)

Sri Bhagirathi Inter College

Maharaja Agrasen Public School

Maya Devi Public School

Kashi Bright Angeles School

Aryan Deep Public School

Mohan Bal Vidhya Mandir

New Adarsh Shiksa Niketan Inter College

Shanti Manohar Inter College

== Administration ==
Dalmau is divided into 10 wards for which elections are held every 5 years.

Dalmau Nagar Panchayat has total administration over 1,882 houses to which it supplies basic amenities like water and sewerage. It is also authorized to build roads within Nagar Panchayat limits and impose taxes on properties coming under its jurisdiction.

== Notable residents ==
Famous Personalities: Pandit Suryakant Tripathi Nirala

== Villages ==
Dalmau CD block has the following 124 villages:

| Village name | Total land area (hectares) | Population (in 2011) |
|---|---|---|
| Ahamadpur Chehata | 135.8 | 896 |
| Daud Ramnagar | 200.1 | 947 |
| Tikran | 123.5 | 1,011 |
| Pilkha | 195.1 | 2,122 |
| Basantpur Kathoria | 393.2 | 2,954 |
| Hasaanapur | 272.2 | 2,083 |
| Lalpur | 38.7 | 212 |
| Awasthipur | 50.2 | 198 |
| Gangapur Baras | 181.1 | 1,085 |
| Ranmau | 77.7 | 710 |
| Baras | 237.2 | 1,875 |
| Madhukarpur | 261.6 | 2,208 |
| Kundwal | 868.8 | 4,461 |
| Aihar | 1,082.2 | 7,502 |
| Sultanpur Jala | 122.3 | 839 |
| Rampur Majare Aihar | 92.9 | 848 |
| Kharagpur Sautana | 242 | 1,187 |
| Dakauli | 128.2 | 665 |
| Khairahani | 73.9 | 307 |
| Sohawal | 149.3 | 1,070 |
| Deepem Mau | 118 | 1,015 |
| Risalpur Lotnaha | 112.6 | 743 |
| Deo Gaon | 438.4 | 2,250 |
| Umara Mau | 59.1 | 1,631 |
| Bhawanipur | 77.3 | 1,011 |
| Madudpur | 88.6 | 984 |
| Rausi | 194.1 | 1,565 |
| Chak Hajipur | 19.8 | 0 |
| Jagatpur Kotaha | 82.4 | 1,014 |
| Lodipur Utrauwa | 1,006.5 | 4,870 |
| Mohan Singh Ka Purwa | 36.6 | 369 |
| Kesaruwa | 335 | 1,871 |
| Govindpur Bhira | 1,110.2 | 7,310 |
| Terukha | 784.6 | 6,288 |
| Belahata | 77.9 | 811 |
| Adilabad | 261 | 1,394 |
| Mir Meranpur | 162.4 | 1,375 |
| Purauli | 124.2 | 665 |
| Sanhe Mau | 26.2 | 28 |
| Kharagpur Kurmiana | 250.3 | 1,499 |
| Karan Mau | 59 | 304 |
| Bhagawanpur Tape Terukha | 56.9 | 712 |
| Higa Mau | 135.4 | 1,195 |
| Kathgar | 512.6 | 4,627 |
| Ranjitpur Lobhari | 212.7 | 1,065 |
| Bhanuwe | 277.8 | 1,286 |
| Sarwra | 147.3 | 1,040 |
| Alodipur | 36.9 | 278 |
| Kuwar Mau Pakari | 130 | 482 |
| Balipur | 494.8 | 2,320 |
| Gaura Ubarani | 106.8 | 698 |
| Rasulpur Gaharwali | 115.1 | 631 |
| Ghorwara | 280.6 | 4,223 |
| Baheria | 173.6 | 1,375 |
| Bhagautipururf Jahanamau | 81.3 | 668 |
| Pakara Girafta | 51.5 | 773 |
| Amiranpur Pakara | 209 | 901 |
| Malpura | 161.6 | 784 |
| Ubarini | 194.2 | 1,095 |
| Eksana Urf Karaksa | 769.6 | 1,959 |
| Bhagwal Bujurg | 75.2 | 592 |
| Kashipur | 75.9 | 618 |
| Bakhtawarpur | 41.3 | 364 |
| Amba | 361.2 | 1,714 |
| Saistabad Urf Nagarumau | 91.6 | 723 |
| Narasawan | 364.6 | 3,137 |
| Narendrpur | 189.1 | 1,961 |
| Bhagawanpur Chhatamba | 70.2 | 397 |
| Tonk | 130.8 | 642 |
| Mansukh Mau | 80 | 394 |
| Bejhla Mau | 78.1 | 708 |
| Rampur Gahir Khet | 181.8 | 1,109 |
| Jagatpur Bardara | 88.9 | 1,099 |
| Darigapur | 145.3 | 1,115 |
| Asthiyawan | 44.3 | 288 |
| Radha Balampur | 133.1 | 988 |
| Sahbhada | 80 | 1,126 |
| Amaraha | 45.4 | 380 |
| Baderwa | 135.6 | 1,246 |
| Malik Bhiti Mu. | 509.2 | 2,714 |
| Jahangirabad | 164.9 | 530 |
| Jamalnagar Mohiuddinpur | 357.2 | 711 |
| Kanaha | 202.5 | 2,485 |
| Balbhaddarpur | 88.8 | 672 |
| Johawa Nataki | 361.4 | 2,452 |
| Dewali | 148.2 | 1,074 |
| Makhdumpur Urf Sekhanpur | 155 | 1,407 |
| Aftabnagar | 105.3 | 1,000 |
| Dalmau Mu. | 1,433 | 7,408 |
| Sarai Dilawar | 94.5 | 2,710 |
| Darbanihar | 30.8 | 403 |
| Murshidabad | 37.3 | 817 |
| Jotiamau | 77.9 | 1,051 |
| Deenganj | 46.7 | 840 |
| Sarai Lakhmi | 85.6 | 871 |
| Chhajjoopur | 27.5 | 335 |
| Semauri | 80.4 | 709 |
| Raipur Thappa Haweli | 304.2 | 2,696 |
| Salimpur | 117.8 | 1,131 |
| Khalilpur | 240.8 | 3,083 |
| Korauli Dabha | 255.8 | 2,098 |
| Sendura Mau | 115 | 719 |
| Nasirpur Ghariyare | 37 | 274 |
| Girdharpur | 76.3 | 621 |
| Pakhara Mau | 37.6 | 395 |
| Kandharpur | 153.2 | 1,216 |
| Santpur | 183.6 | 1,069 |
| Teliani | 65.9 | 717 |
| Bharsana | 191.1 | 1,550 |
| Gaffoorpur Urf Jalalabad | 94.5 | 644 |
| Surasana | 234.8 | 2,150 |
| Surajoopur | 67.2 | 1,028 |
| Pakharauli | 761.9 | 4,536 |
| Barara Bujurg | 800.1 | 5,685 |
| Khodaypur | 177.6 | 1,367 |
| Rampur Barara | 60.9 | 633 |
| Islampur | 23.4 | 89 |
| Mutawallipur Urf Ayodhya Bux | 51.9 | 401 |
| Vishundaspur | 152.5 | 940 |
| Selaraha | 109 | 465 |
| Bhatiara | 79.9 | 457 |
| Basi Paran | 57 | 290 |
| Kadha Chak Sagunpur | 75.2 | 1,066 |
| Sagunpur | 68.7 | 228 |
