= Kandharpur =

Kandharpur Kandhārpur
- Village
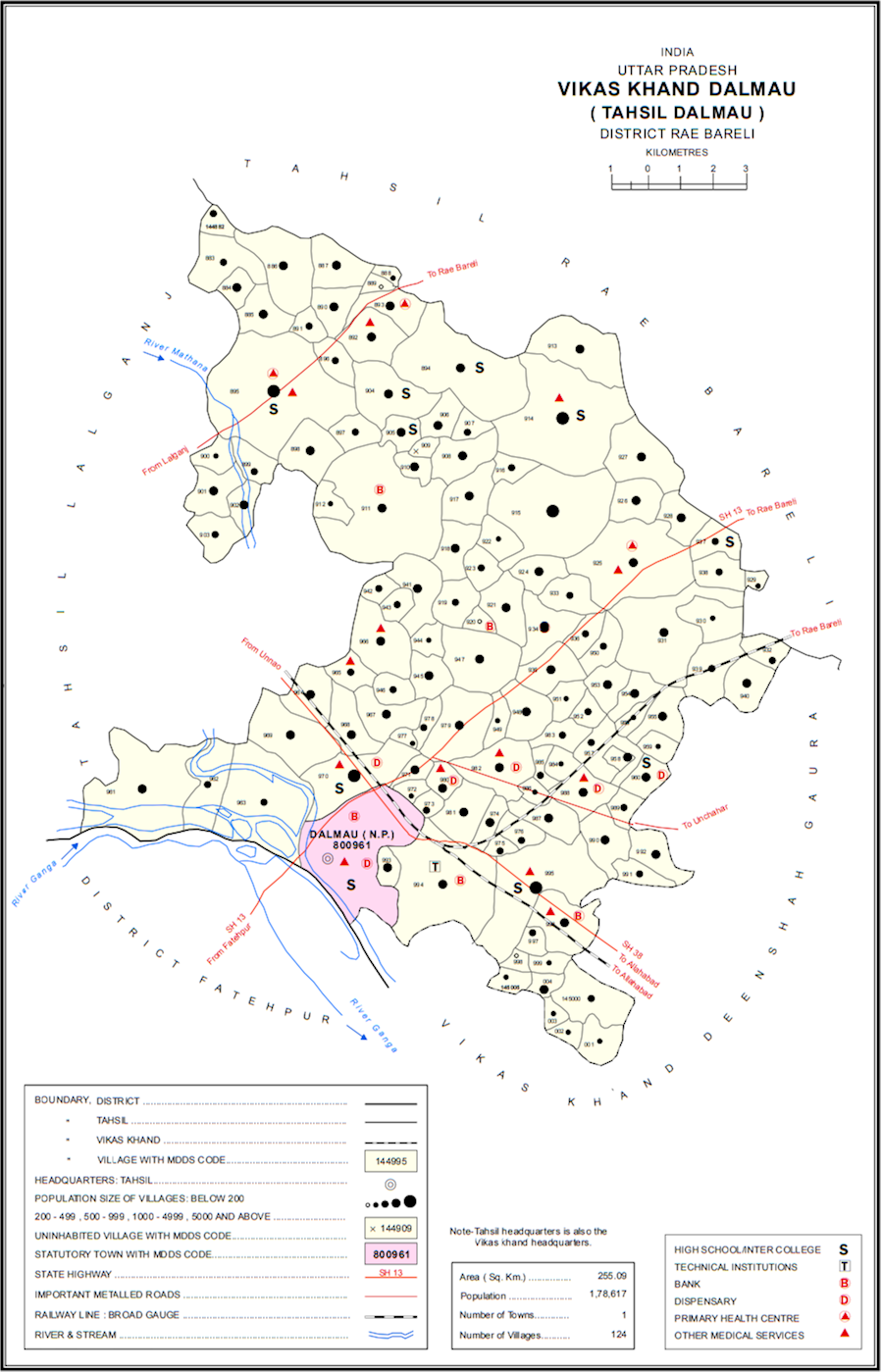
- Map showing Kandharpur (#987) in Dalmau CD block

- Location in Uttar Pradesh, India
- Coordinates: 26.071117°N 81.103179°E
- Country India: India
- State: Uttar Pradesh
- District: Raebareli

Area
  - Total: 1.532 km^{2} (0.592 sq mi)

Population (2011)
  - Total: 1,216
  - Density: 793.7/km^{2} (2,056/sq mi)

Languages
  - Official: Hindi
- Time zone: UTC+5:30 (IST)
- Vehicle registration: UP-35

Kandharpur is a village in Dalmau block of Rae Bareli district, Uttar Pradesh, India. It is located 8 km from Dalmau, the block headquarters. As of 2011, it has a population of 1,216 people, in 229 households. It has one primary school and no healthcare facilities.

The 1961 census recorded Kandharpur as comprising 2 hamlets, with a total population of 378 people (200 male and 178 female), in 74 households and 73 physical houses. The area of the village was given as 407 acres.

The 1981 census recorded Kandharpur as having a population of 572 people, in 116 households, and having an area of 156.21 hectares. The main staple foods were listed as wheat and rice.
