= Baheria =

- Village
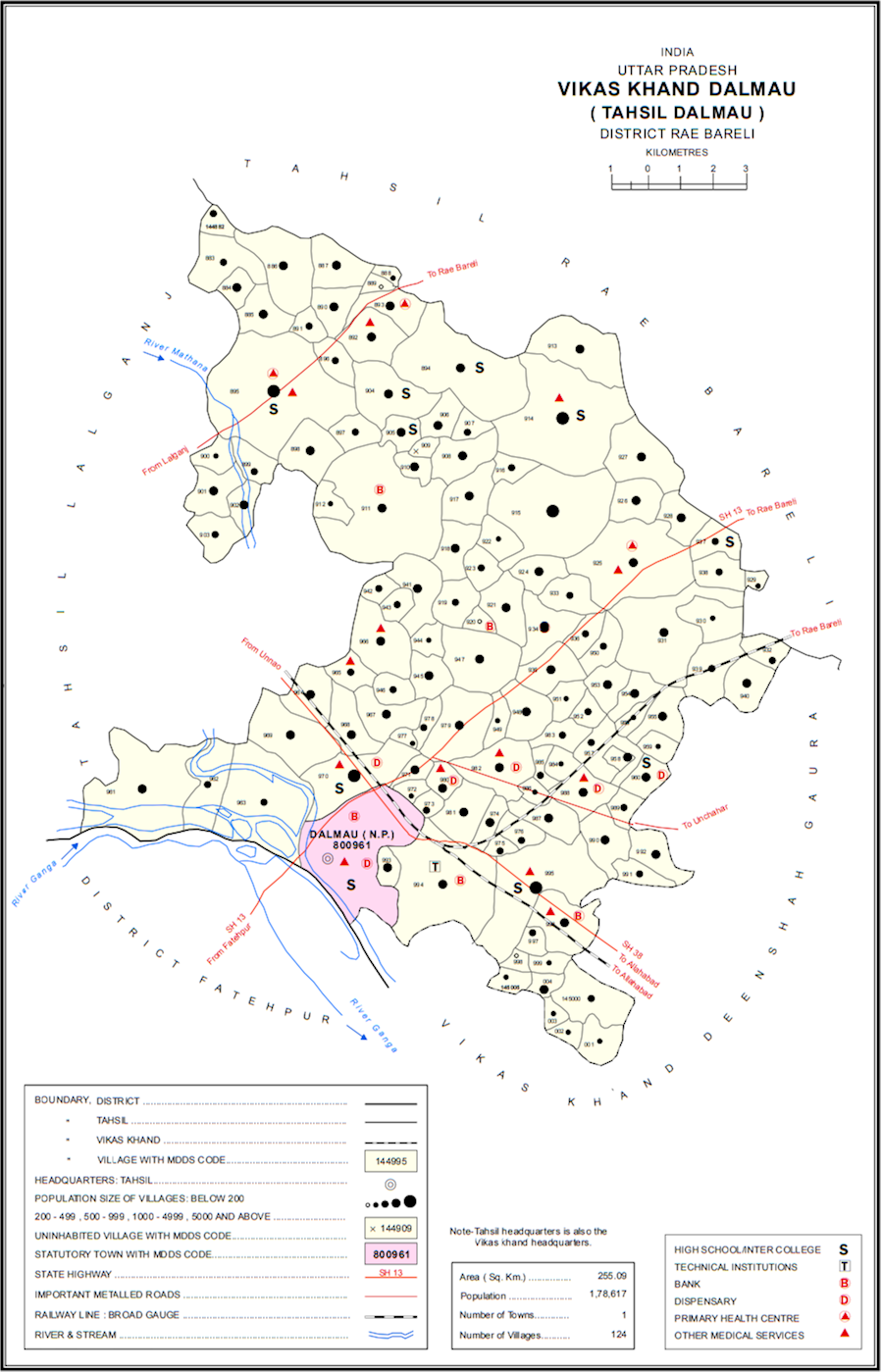
- Map showing Baheria (#935) in Dalmau CD block

- Location in Uttar Pradesh, India
- Coordinates: 26.110304°N 81.105641°E
- Country India: India
- State: Uttar Pradesh
- District: Raebareli

Area
  - Total: 1.736 km^{2} (0.670 sq mi)

Population (2011)
  - Total: 1,375
  - Density: 792.1/km^{2} (2,051/sq mi)

Languages
  - Official: Hindi
- Time zone: UTC+5:30 (IST)
- Vehicle registration: UP-35

Baheria is a village in Dalmau block of Rae Bareli district, Uttar Pradesh, India. It is located 8 km from Dalmau, the block headquarters. As of 2011, it has a population of 1,375 people, in 312 households. It has one primary school and no healthcare facilities.

The 1961 census recorded Baheria as comprising 3 hamlets, with a total population of 487 people (255 male and 232 female), in 96 households and 84 physical houses. The area of the village was given as 414 acres.

The 1981 census recorded Baheria (as "Baherya") as having a population of 714 people, in 144 households, and having an area of 182.52 hectares. The main staple foods were listed as wheat and rice.
