= Umramau =

Umramau Umrāmau
- Village
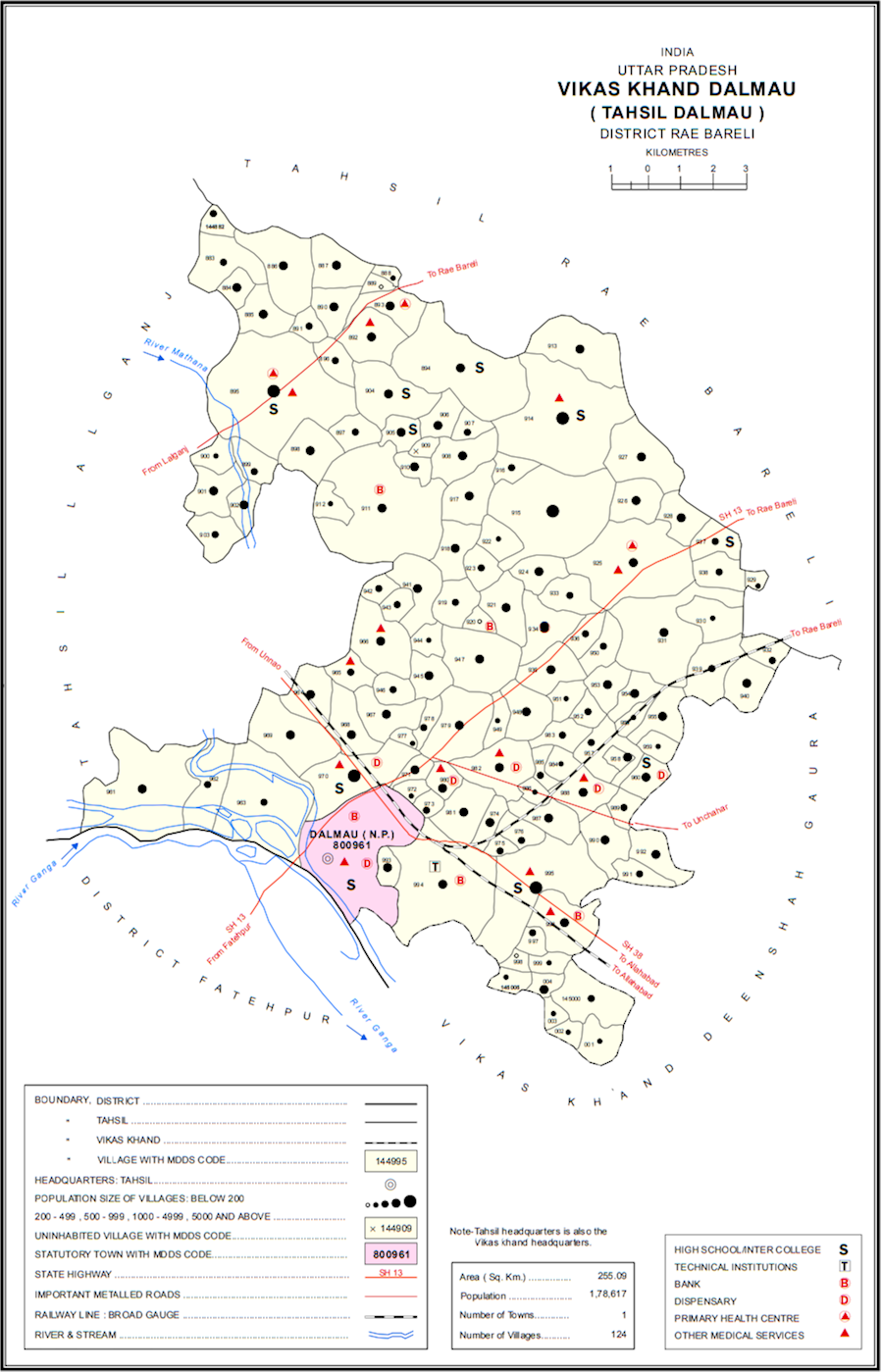
- Map showing Umramau (#905) in Dalmau CD block

- Location in Uttar Pradesh, India
- Coordinates: 26.175581°N 81.059499°E
- Country India: India
- State: Uttar Pradesh
- District: Raebareli

Area
  - Total: 0.591 km^{2} (0.228 sq mi)

Population (2011)
  - Total: 1,631
  - Density: 2,760/km^{2} (7,150/sq mi)

Languages
  - Official: Hindi
- Time zone: UTC+5:30 (IST)
- Vehicle registration: UP-35

Umramau, also spelled Umaramau, is a village in Dalmau block of Rae Bareli district, Uttar Pradesh, India. As of 2011, it has a population of 1,631 people, in 280 households. It has one primary school and no healthcare facilities.

The 1961 census recorded Umramau as comprising 1 hamlet, with a total population of 764 people (365 male and 399 female), in 146 households and 114 physical houses. The area of the village was given as 152 acres.

The 1981 census recorded Umramau as having a population of 678 people, in 108 households, and having an area of 59.08 hectares. The main staple foods were listed as wheat and rice.
