= Sanhemau =

- Village
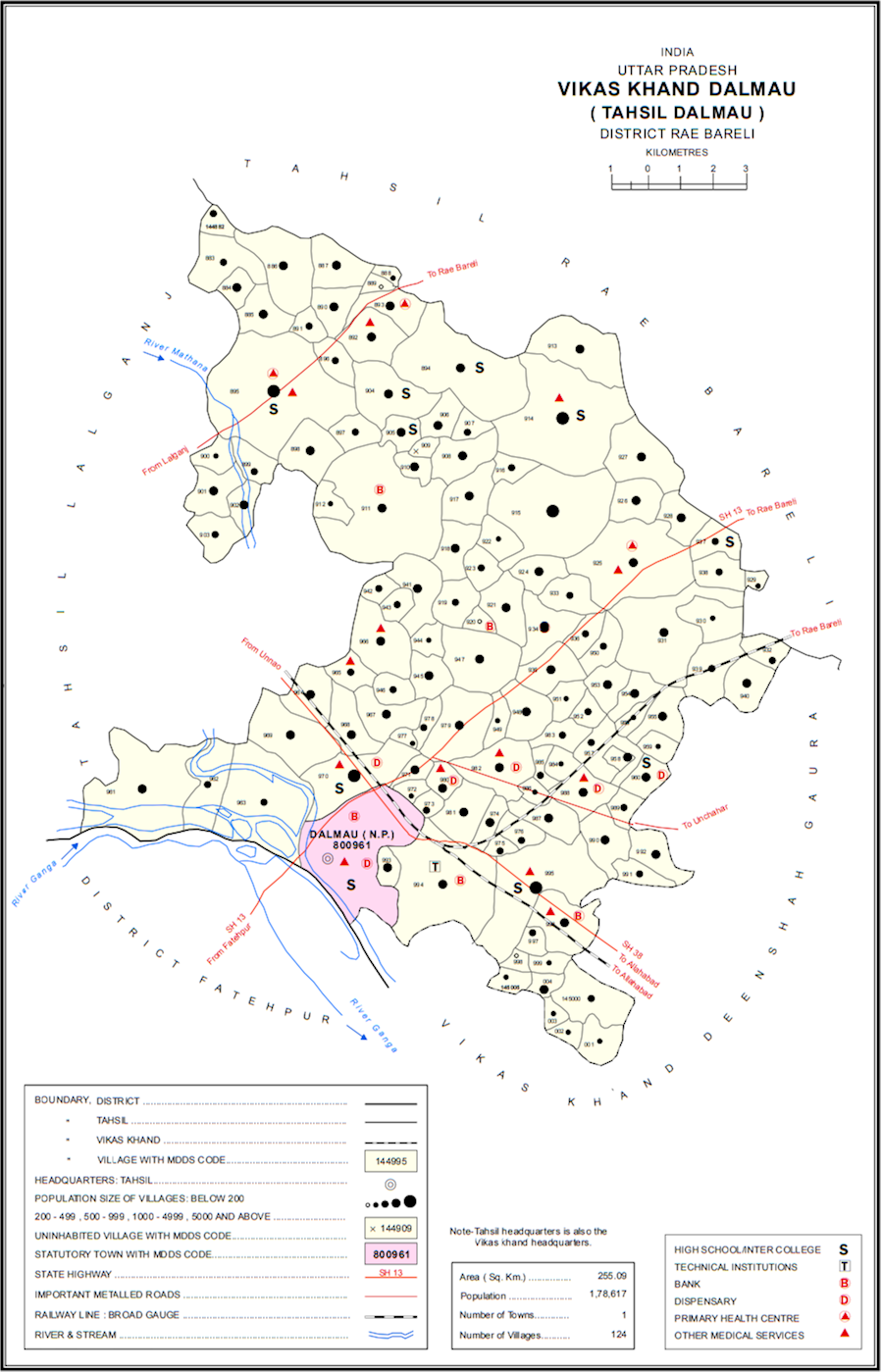
- Map showing Sanhemau (#920) in Dalmau CD block

- Location in Uttar Pradesh, India
- Coordinates: 26.126098°N 81.08117°E
- Country India: India
- State: Uttar Pradesh
- District: Raebareli

Area
  - Total: 0.262 km^{2} (0.101 sq mi)

Population (2011)
  - Total: 28
  - Density: 110/km^{2} (280/sq mi)

Languages
  - Official: Hindi
- Time zone: UTC+5:30 (IST)
- Vehicle registration: UP-35

Sanhemau is a village in Dalmau block of Rae Bareli district, Uttar Pradesh, India. It is located 13 km from Dalmau, the block headquarters. As of 2011, it has a population of 28 people, in 5 households. It has no schools and no healthcare facilities.

The 1961 census recorded Sanhemau (as "Sanhimau") as comprising 1 hamlet, with a total population of 15 people (5 male and 10 female), in 2 households and 2 physical houses. The area of the village was given as 66 acres.

The 1981 census recorded Sanhemau as having a population of 20 people, in 4 households, and having an area of 26.31 hectares. The main staple foods were listed as wheat and rice.
