= Barara Buzurg =

- Village
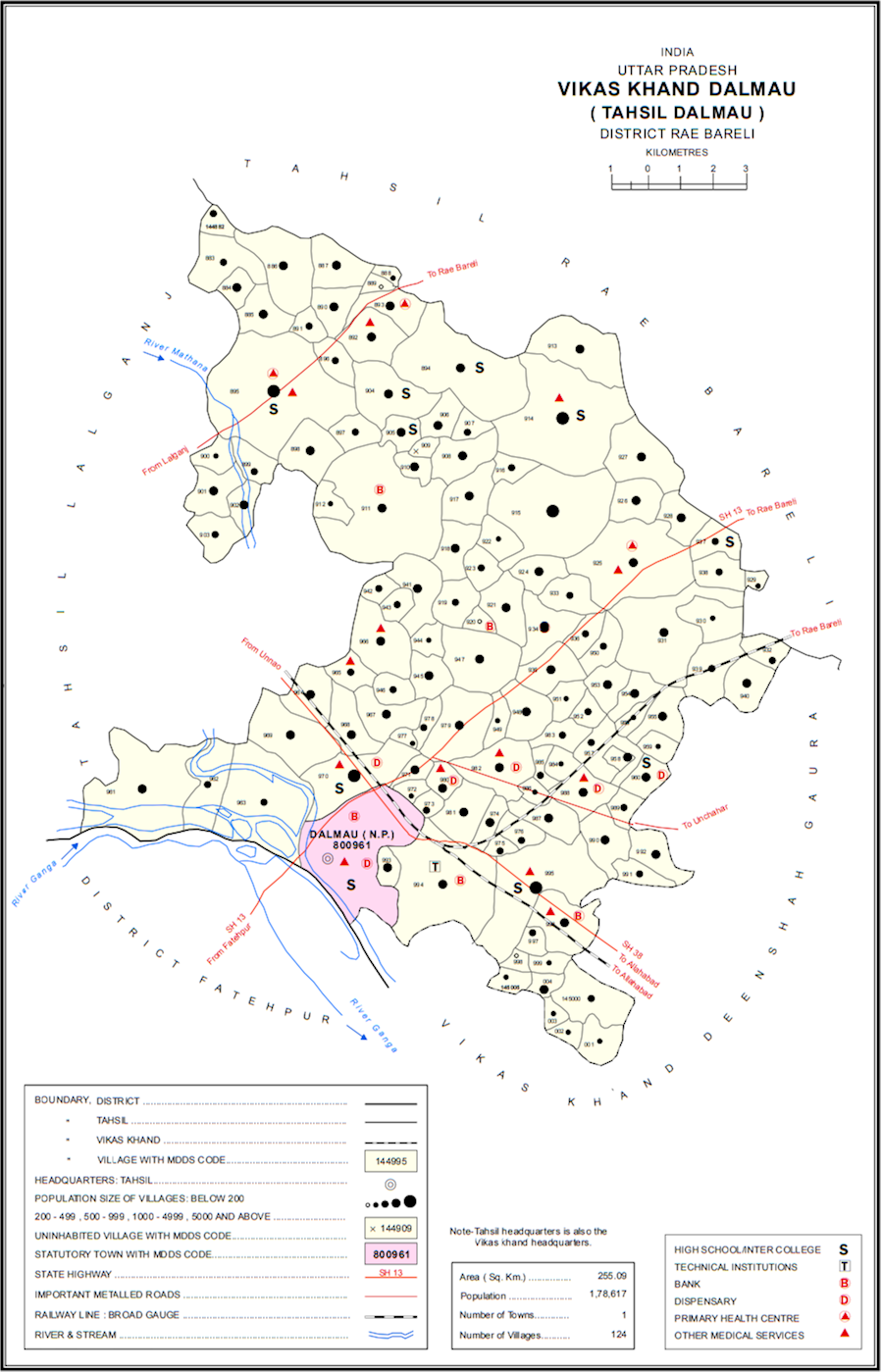
- Map showing Barara Buzurg (#995) in Dalmau CD block

- Location in Uttar Pradesh, India
- Coordinates: 26.051937°N 81.104595°E
- Country India: India
- State: Uttar Pradesh
- District: Raebareli

Area
  - Total: 8.001 km^{2} (3.089 sq mi)

Population (2011)
  - Total: 5,685
  - Density: 710.5/km^{2} (1,840/sq mi)

Languages
  - Official: Hindi
- Time zone: UTC+5:30 (IST)
- Vehicle registration: UP-35

Barara Buzurg is a village in Dalmau block of Rae Bareli district, Uttar Pradesh, India. It is located 8 km (5.0 mi) from Dalmau, the block headquarters. As of 2011, it has a population of 5,685 people, in 1,031 households. It has 4 primary schools and 1 maternity and child welfare centre. It hosts a market twice per week, on Mondays and Fridays; cattle, cloth, and vegetables are the main items traded.

The 1961 census recorded Barara Buzurg as comprising 16 hamlets, with a total population of 2,441 people (1,241 male and 1,200 female), in 483 households and 443 physical houses. The area of the village was given as 1,904 acres and it had a pot office and a medical practitioner at that point. Average attendance for the twice-weekly market was about 150 people.

The 1981 census recorded Barara Buzurg as having a population of 3,424 people, in 619 households, and having an area of 779.52 hectares. The main staple foods were listed as wheat and rice.
