= Mirmiranpur =

- Village
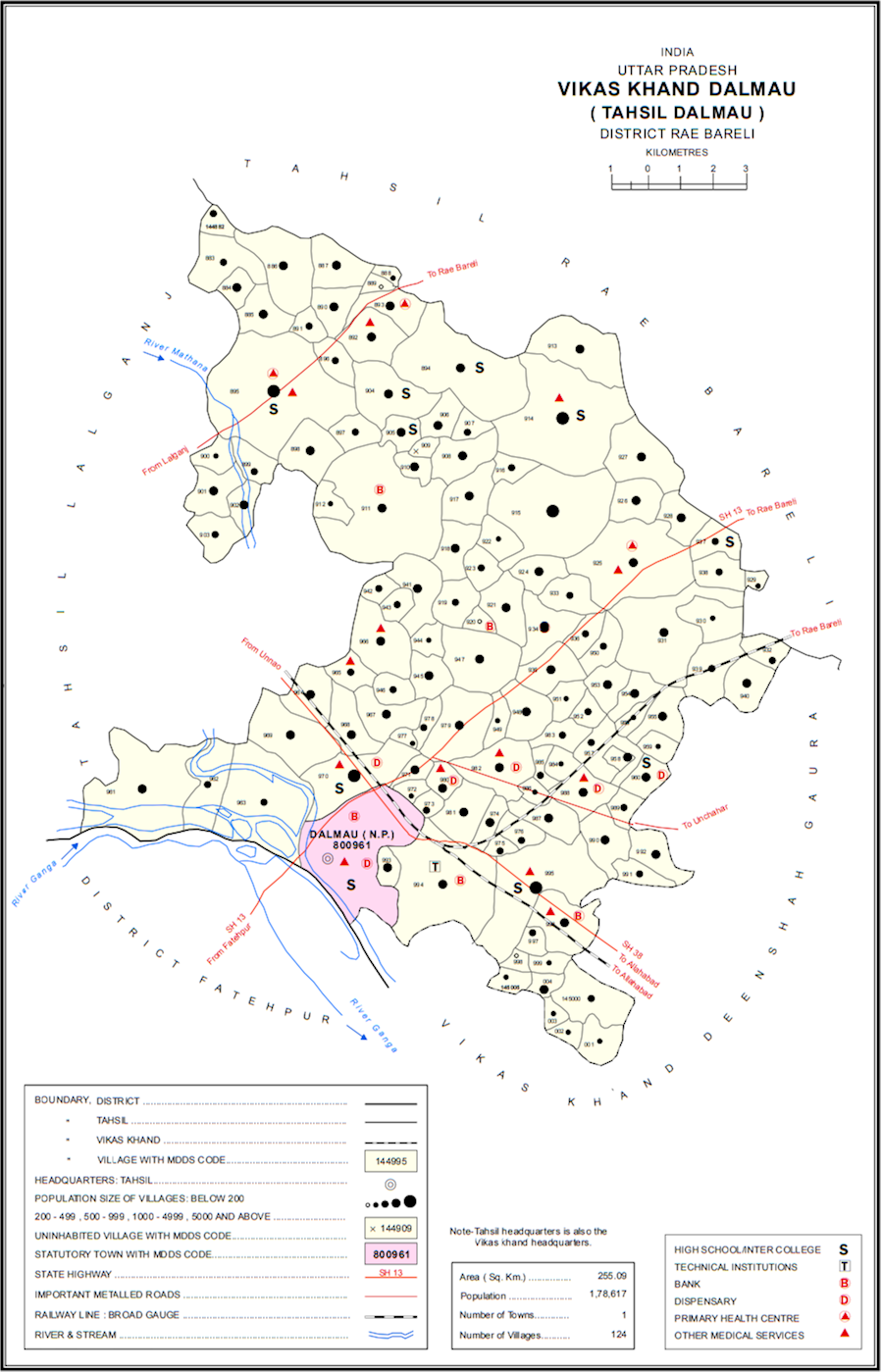
- Map showing Mirmiranpur (#918) in Dalmau CD block

- Location in Uttar Pradesh, India
- Coordinates: 26.143166°N 81.075548°E
- Country India: India
- State: Uttar Pradesh
- District: Raebareli

Area
  - Total: 1.624 km^{2} (0.627 sq mi)

Population (2011)
  - Total: 1,375
  - Density: 846.7/km^{2} (2,193/sq mi)

Languages
  - Official: Hindi
- Time zone: UTC+5:30 (IST)
- Vehicle registration: UP-35

Mirmiranpur is a village in Dalmau block of Rae Bareli district, Uttar Pradesh, India. It is located 11 km from Dalmau, the block headquarters. As of 2011, it has a population of 1,375 people, in 270 households. It has one primary school and no healthcare facilities.

The 1961 census recorded Mirmiranpur (as "Mir Miranpur") as comprising 4 hamlets, with a total population of 772 people (411 male and 361 female), in 146 households and 142 physical houses. The area of the village was given as 396 acres.

The 1981 census recorded Mirmiranpur as having a population of 999 people, in 196 households, and having an area of 168.75 hectares. The main staple foods were listed as wheat and rice.
