= Balipur, Dalmau =

Balipur Bālipur
- Village
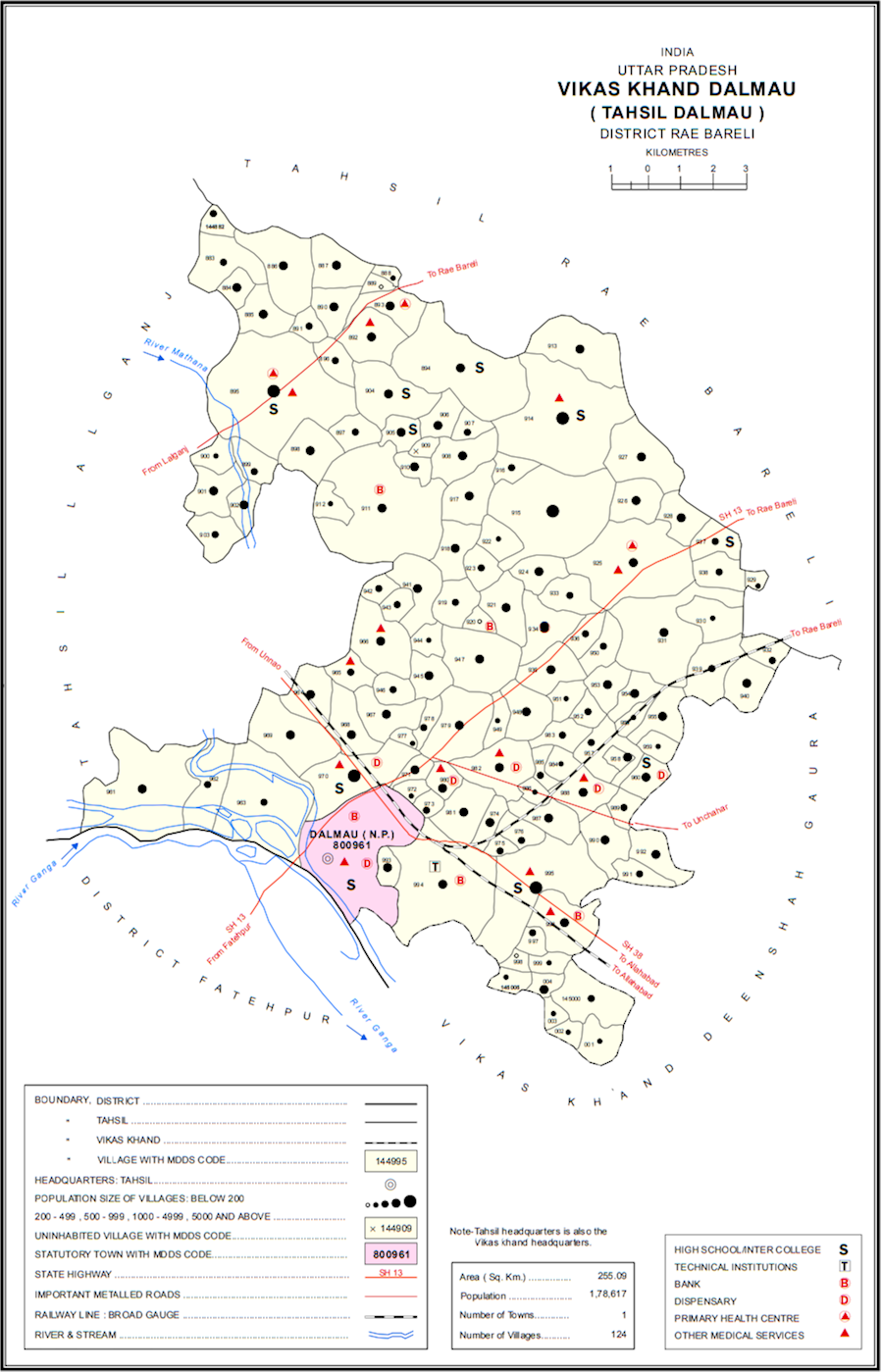
- Map showing Balipur (#931) in Dalmau CD block

- Location in Uttar Pradesh, India
- Coordinates: 26.116076°N 81.136736°E
- Country India: India
- State: Uttar Pradesh
- District: Raebareli

Area
  - Total: 4.948 km^{2} (1.910 sq mi)

Population (2011)
  - Total: 2,320
  - Density: 469/km^{2} (1,210/sq mi)

Languages
  - Official: Hindi
- Time zone: UTC+5:30 (IST)
- Vehicle registration: UP-35

Balipur is a village in Dalmau block of Rae Bareli district, Uttar Pradesh, India. It is located 12 km from Dalmau, the block headquarters. As of 2011, it has a population of 2,320 people, in 434 households. It has two primary schools and no healthcare facilities.

The 1961 census recorded Balipur as comprising 6 hamlets, with a total population of 972 people (466 male and 506 female), in 202 households and 183 physical houses. The area of the village was given as 1,242 acres.

The 1981 census recorded Balipur as having a population of 1,187 people, in 276 households, and having an area of 502.63 hectares. The main staple foods were listed as wheat and rice.
