= Karanmau =

- Village
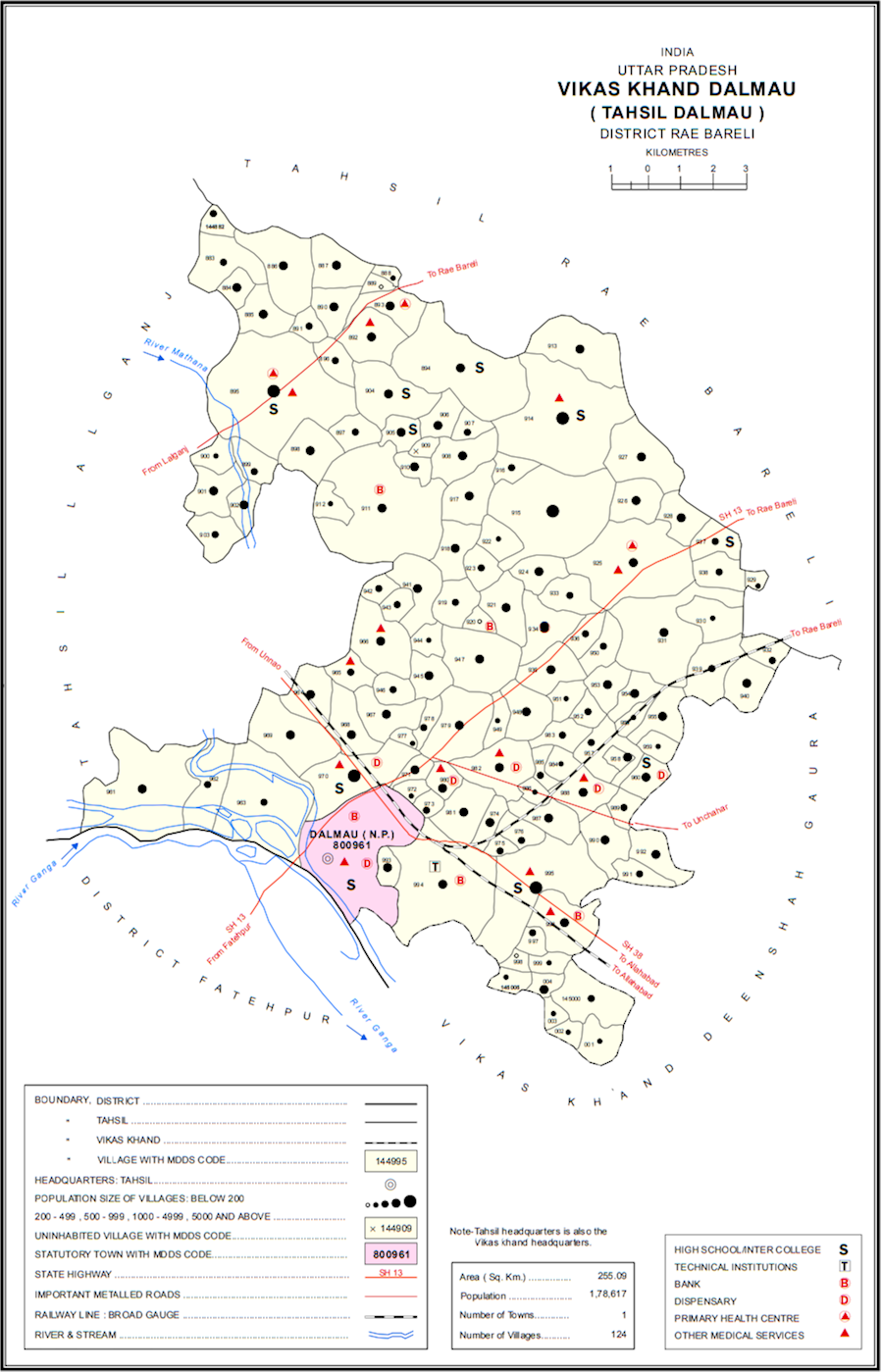
- Map showing Karanmau (#922) in Dalmau CD block

- Location in Uttar Pradesh, India
- Coordinates: 26.147211°N 81.092478°E
- Country India: India
- State: Uttar Pradesh
- District: Raebareli

Area
  - Total: 0.59 km^{2} (0.23 sq mi)

Population (2011)
  - Total: 304
  - Density: 520/km^{2} (1,300/sq mi)

Languages
  - Official: Hindi
- Time zone: UTC+5:30 (IST)
- Vehicle registration: UP-35

Karanmau is a village in Dalmau block of Rae Bareli district, Uttar Pradesh, India. It is located 11 km from Dalmau, the block headquarters. As of 2011, it has a population of 304 people, in 52 households. It has one primary school and no healthcare facilities.

The 1961 census recorded Karanmau as comprising 1 hamlet, with a total population of 148 people (77 male and 71 female), in 32 households and 30 physical houses. The area of the village was given as 160 acres.

The 1981 census recorded Karanmau as having a population of 220 people, in 59 households, and having an area of 59.89 hectares. The main staple foods were listed as wheat and rice.
