= Ranmau =

- Village
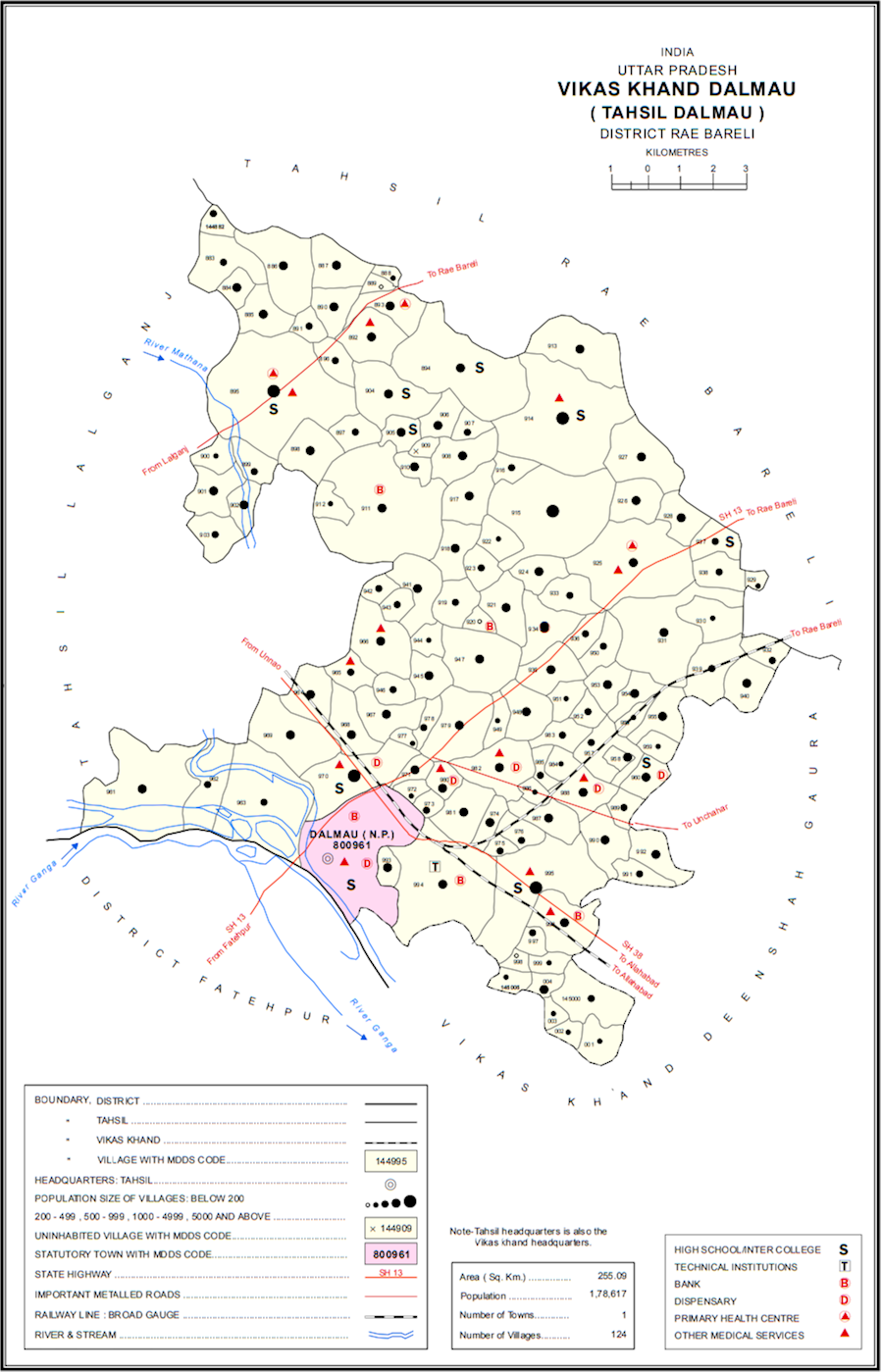
- Map showing Ranmau (#891) in Dalmau CD block

- Location in Uttar Pradesh, India
- Coordinates: 26.20772°N 81.033775°E
- Country India: India
- State: Uttar Pradesh
- District: Raebareli

Area
  - Total: 0.777 km^{2} (0.300 sq mi)

Population (2011)
  - Total: 710
  - Density: 910/km^{2} (2,400/sq mi)

Languages
  - Official: Hindi
- Time zone: UTC+5:30 (IST)
- Vehicle registration: UP-35

Ranmau is a village in Dalmau block of Rae Bareli district, Uttar Pradesh, India. The nearest large town is Lalganj, which is 8 km away. As of 2011, it has a population of 710 people, in 119 households. It has one primary school and no healthcare facilities.

The 1961 census recorded Ranmau as comprising 1 hamlet, with a total population of 313 people (152 male and 161 female), in 56 households and 47 physical houses. The area of the village was given as 195 acres. There were 5 small shoe manufacturers in the village at that point.

The 1981 census recorded Ranmau as having a population of 463 people, in 77 households, and having an area of 77.70 hectares. The main staple foods were listed as wheat and rice.
