= Pakhrauli =

- Village
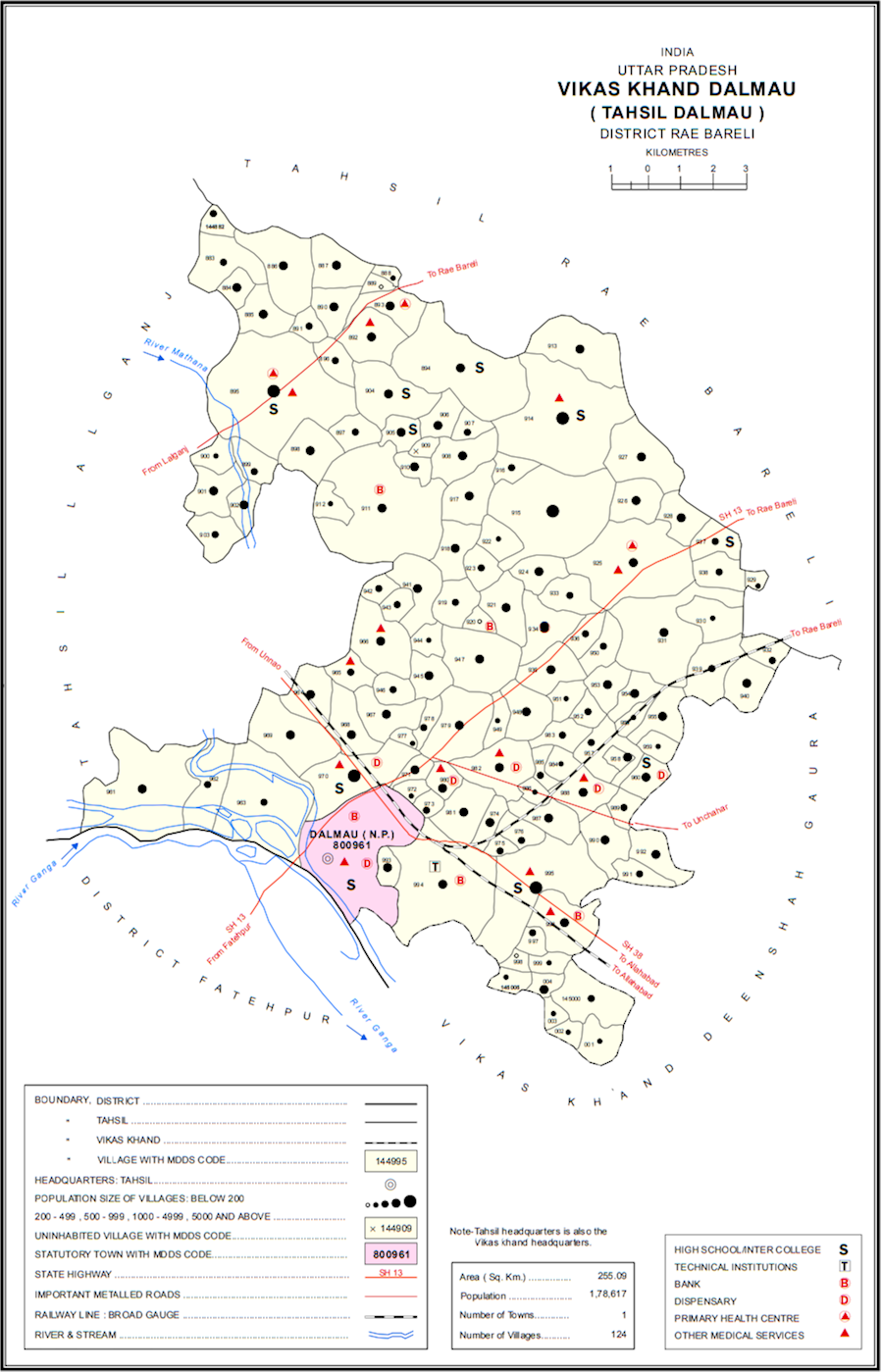
- Map showing Pakhrauli (#994) in Dalmau CD block

- Location in Uttar Pradesh, India
- Coordinates: 26.054135°N 81.065392°E
- Country India: India
- State: Uttar Pradesh
- District: Raebareli

Area
  - Total: 7.619 km^{2} (2.942 sq mi)

Population (2011)
  - Total: 4,536
  - Density: 595.4/km^{2} (1,542/sq mi)

Languages
  - Official: Hindi
- Time zone: UTC+5:30 (IST)
- Vehicle registration: UP-35

Pakhrauli is a village in Dalmau block of Rae Bareli district, Uttar Pradesh, India. It is located 3 km from Dalmau, the block headquarters. As of 2011, it has a population of 4,536 people, in 844 households. It has one primary school and no healthcare facilities, as well as a sub post office.

The 1961 census recorded Pakhrauli as comprising 10 hamlets, with a total population of 1,755 people (872 male and 883 female), in 330 households and 314 physical houses. The area of the village was given as 1,963 acres.

The 1981 census recorded Pakhrauli as having a population of 2,604 people, in 450 households, and having an area of 755.96 hectares. The main staple foods were listed as wheat and rice.
