= Daudpur (disambiguation) =

Daudpur is a market town in the Saran district of Bihar, India.

Daudpur may also refer to the following settlements in India:

- Daudpur, Bewar, a village in Mainpuri district, Uttar Pradesh
- Daudpur, Kapurthala, a village in Punjab
- Daudpur, Kishni, a village in Mainpuri district, Uttar Pradesh
- Daudpur, Raebareli, a village in Uttar Pradesh
