= Lalupur Khas =

Lalupur Khas Lālupur Khās
- Village
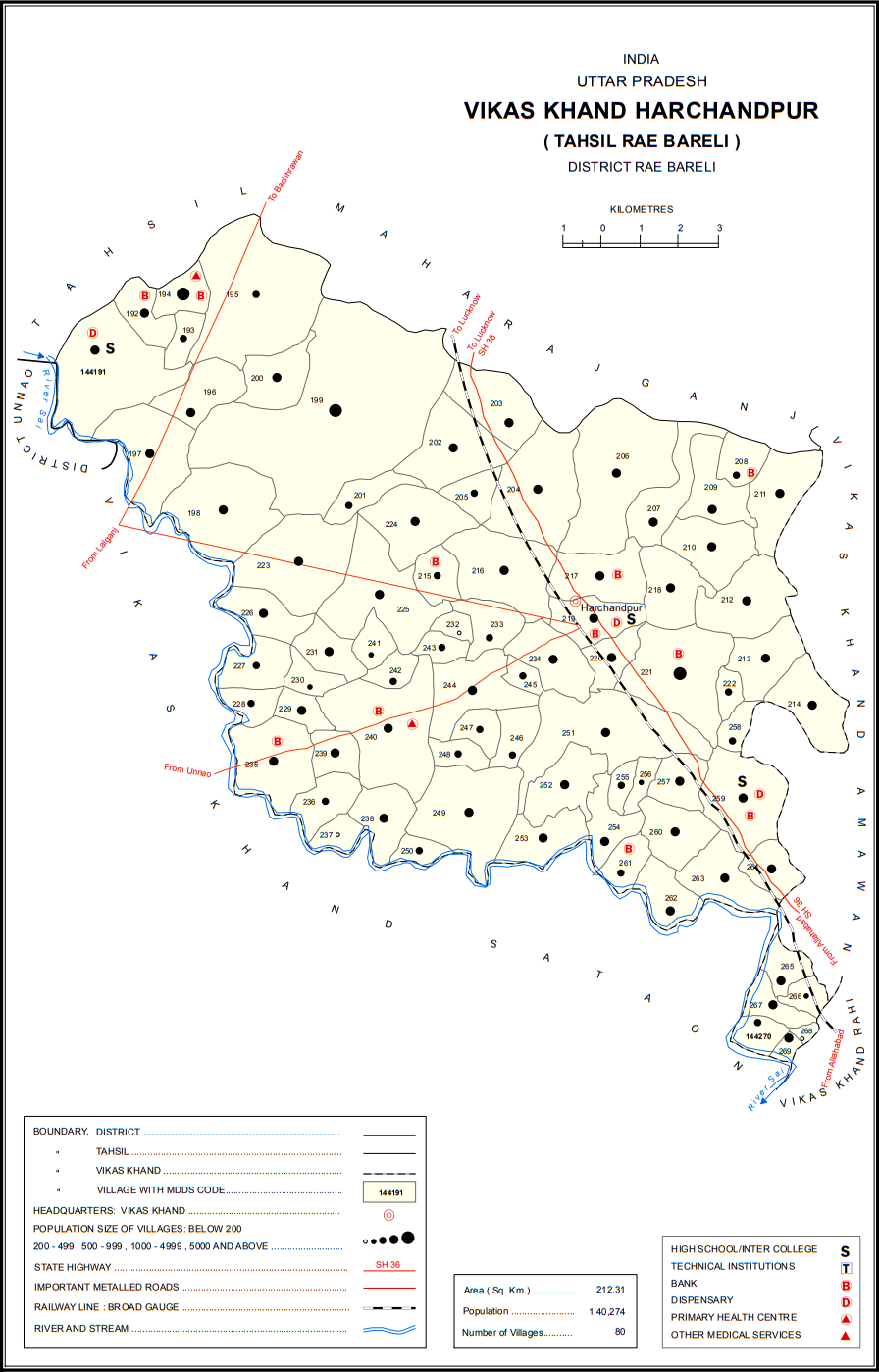
- Map showing Lalupur Khas (#262) in Harchandpur CD block

- Location in Uttar Pradesh, India
- Coordinates: 26.274439°N 81.185805°E
- Country India: India
- State: Uttar Pradesh
- District: Raebareli

Area
  - Total: 1.745 km^{2} (0.674 sq mi)

Population (2011)
  - Total: 1,126
  - Density: 645.3/km^{2} (1,671/sq mi)

Languages
  - Official: Hindi
- Time zone: UTC+5:30 (IST)
- Vehicle registration: UP-33

Lalupur Khas is a village in Harchandpur block of Rae Bareli district, Uttar Pradesh, India. It is located 6 km from Raebareli, the district headquarters. As of 2011, its population is 1,126, in 206 households. It has one primary school and no healthcare facilities.

The 1961 census recorded Lalupur Khas as comprising 1 hamlet, with a total population of 476 people (248 male and 228 female), in 103 households and 86 physical houses. The area of the village was given as 445 acres and it had a medical practitioner at that point.

The 1981 census recorded Lalupur Khas as having a population of 683 people, in 132 households, and having an area of 175.64 hectares. The main staple foods were given as wheat and barley.
