= Kanhat =

- Village
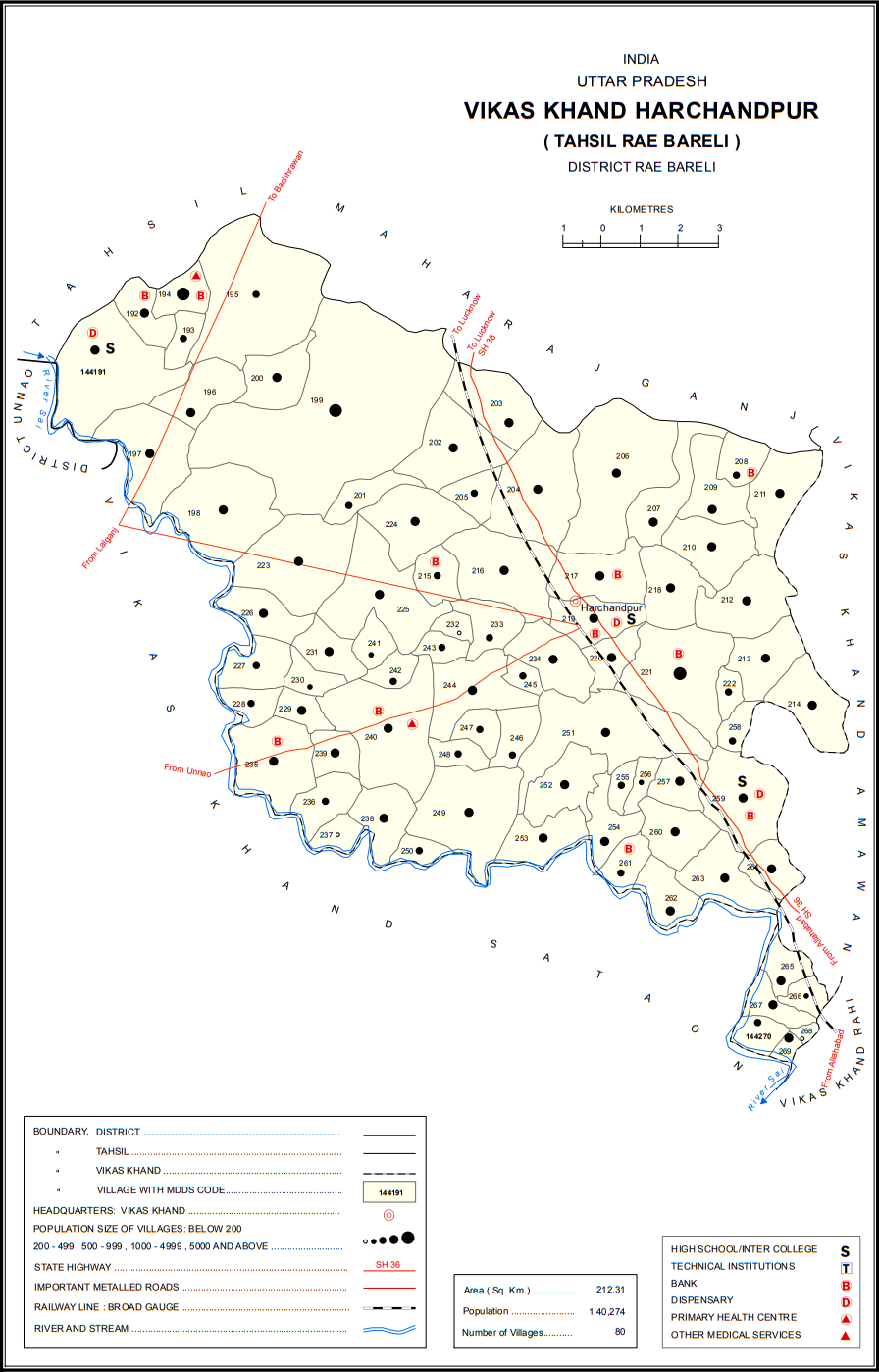
- Map showing Kanhat (#205) in Harchandpur CD block

- Location in Uttar Pradesh, India
- Coordinates: 26.365777°N 81.14177°E
- Country India: India
- State: Uttar Pradesh
- District: Raebareli

Area
  - Total: 1.147 km^{2} (0.443 sq mi)

Population (2011)
  - Total: 596
  - Density: 520/km^{2} (1,350/sq mi)

Languages
  - Official: Hindi
- Time zone: UTC+5:30 (IST)
- Vehicle registration: UP-35

Kanhat is a village in Harchandpur block of Rae Bareli district, Uttar Pradesh, India. As of 2011, its population is 596, in 105 households. It has one primary school and no healthcare facilities.

The 1961 census recorded Kanhat as comprising 1 hamlet, with a total population of 205 people (109 male and 97 female), in 39 households and 38 physical houses. The area of the village was given as 287 acres.

The 1981 census recorded Kanhat (as "Qanhat") as having a population of 325 people, in 51 households, and having an area of 120.20 hectares. The main staple foods were given as wheat and rice, and no amenities other than drinking water were available.
