= Para, Raebareli =

Para Pāra
- Village
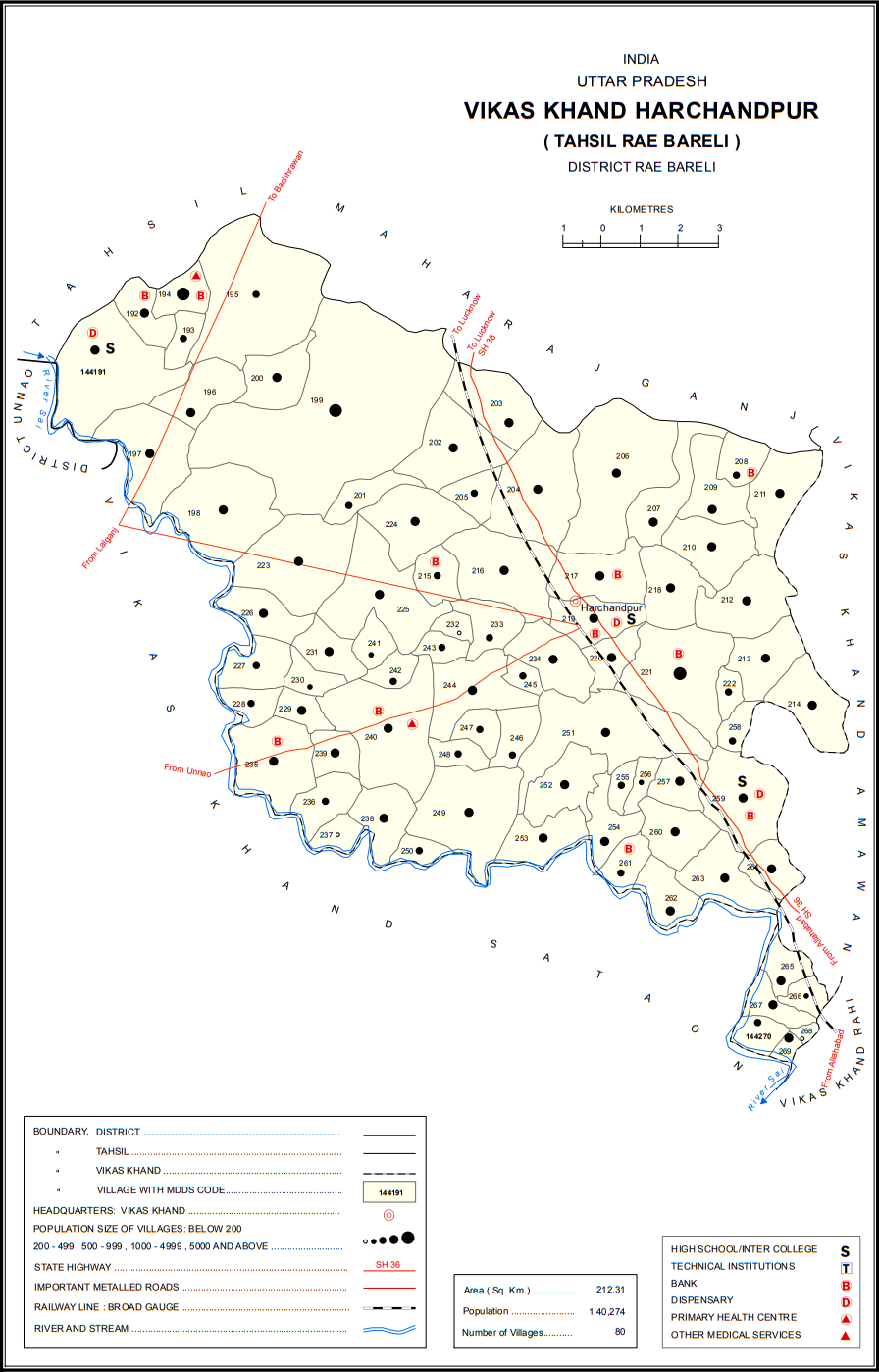
- Map showing Para (#238) in Harchandpur CD block

- Location in Uttar Pradesh, India
- Coordinates: 26.290832°N 81.114283°E
- Country India: India
- State: Uttar Pradesh
- District: Raebareli

Area
  - Total: 2.147 km^{2} (0.829 sq mi)

Population (2011)
  - Total: 2,142
  - Density: 997.7/km^{2} (2,584/sq mi)

Languages
  - Official: Hindi
- Time zone: UTC+5:30 (IST)
- PIN: 229308
- Vehicle registration: UP-35

Para is a village in Harchandpur block of Rae Bareli district, Uttar Pradesh, India. As of 2011, its population is 2,142, in 408 households. It has two primary schools and no healthcare facilities.

The 1961 census recorded Para as comprising 2 hamlets, with a total population of 764 people (386 male and 378 female), in 180 households and 152 physical houses. The area of the village was given as 523 acres.

The 1981 census recorded Chak Sunda as having a population of 1,160 people, in 229 households, and having an area of 214.09 hectares.
