= Harchandpur =

- Village
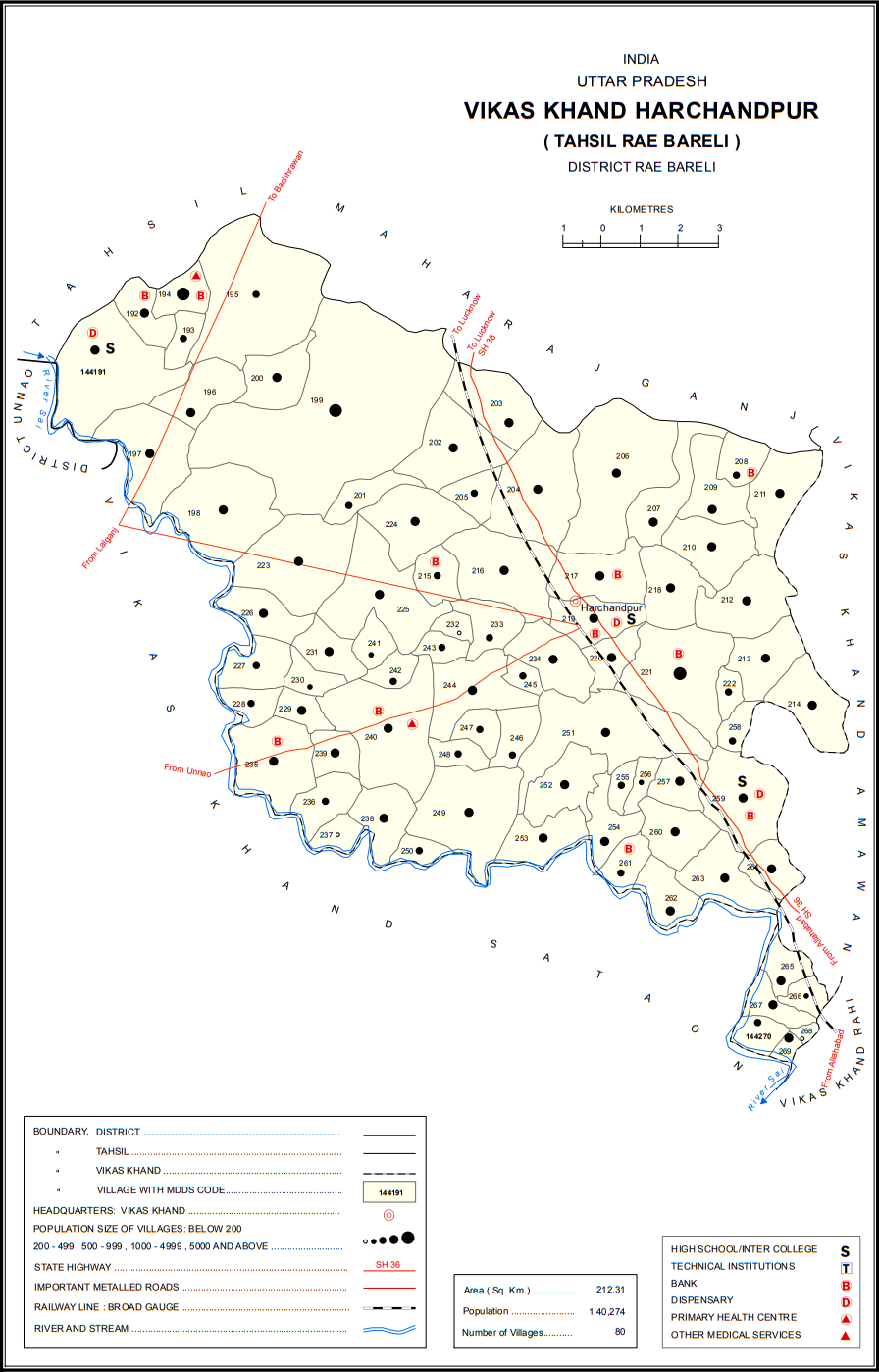
- Map of Harchandpur CD block

- Location in Uttar Pradesh, India
- Coordinates: 26.36°N 81.17°E
- Country: India
- State: Uttar Pradesh
- District: Raebareli

Government
  - Type: Legislative Assembly
  - Body: Government of Uttar Pradesh
  - MLA: Rakesh Singh (INC)

Population (2016)
  - Total: 140,274
- Time zone: UTC+5:30 (IST)
- PIN: 229303
- Telephone Code: +91-535
- Vehicle registration: UP-33
- Official language: Hindi
- Website: raebareli.nic.in

Harchandpur is a village and corresponding community development block in Raebareli district, Uttar Pradesh, India. It is located on the Baiti river, which is a tributary of the Sai, and it is northeast from the district headquarters on the road to Lucknow. Particularly since the coming of the railway in the 1800s, Harchandpur serves as one of the main commercial centres for the surrounding region; it is also a major exporter of local goods. As of 2011, its population is 4,348 people, in 833 households.

Harchandpur is also a constituency of the Uttar Pradesh Legislative Assembly, under the district of Raebareli. The Pin Code of the town is 229303 and there are 47 Gram panchayats under Harchandpur.

== History ==
HarchandPur was founded by Nabh Rai, a Kayastha who served as the diwan to the Bais raja Tilok Chand, and named after his son Har Chand, who was adopted in 1350 Samvat. His descendants are still major landowners in Harchandpur; one of them, Jai Narain Srivastava, was appointed the first Station Master of Harchandpur Railway Station in 1893.

With the opening of the Oudh and Rohilkhand Railway in the 1800s, Harchandpur experienced a boom in commercial activity. The main line of the railway passed through town, and the Harchandpur railway station quickly became a major point of export for local goods like grain, hides, and oilseeds. The Raghuveergang bazar in Harchandpur was founded by Thakurain Udairaj Kunwar in 1894 (after the opening of the station) and named after her late husband Raghubar Bakhsh Singh, the taluqdar of Hasnapur. By 1905, it was described as one of the main markets in the Raebareli tehsil. At that point, it also had a post office, a cattle pound, and a large primary school, as well as a military encampment on the road to the northwest. The population in 1901 was 1,457, including many Brahmins, Bania, Muslims, and other caste.

== Transport ==
=== Road ===
Harchandpur is on the route of National Highway 30, between Lucknow and Rae Bareli.

=== Bus ===
Uttar Pradesh State Road Transport Corporation (UPSRTC) buses also run through the town. Buses stop near the main market place. Private transport vehicles runs all directions to near locations.

=== Rail ===
The town has its own railway station. The rail line connects Rae Bareli to Lucknow, on the Northern Railways network.

=== Air ===
1. Lucknow International Airport towards west (approx. 64 km)
2. Raebareli Airport toward east (approx. 30 km)

== National Highway ==
National Highway 30 (India) NH 30 - Lucknow 》 Raebareli 》 Allahabad

== Education ==
The educational institutions of Harchandpur are affiliated to Central Board of Secondary Education, UP Board, and CSJM University Kanpur. Primary education is imparted by the government schools as well as private schools in the surrounding villages along with degree colleges.

=== Colleges ===
- Janpad Inter College, Harchandpur Raebareli.
- Vishvanath Siksha Sansthan, Achleshwar.
- Sun Shine Public School, Maharajganj Road, Harchandpur.
- Bal Vidya Mandir Inter College, Gangaganj.
- Dayawati Modi Public School, Kathwara Harchandpur.
- P.D. Public School, Achleshwar.
- Chandrapal Inter College, Gangaganj.
- Sri Mahavir Singh Smarak Mahavidyalaya, Kathwara Harchandpur.
- Mahavir Institute Of Technology & Management (MITM), Harchandpur.
- Mahavir Institute Of Pharmacy, Kathwara Harchandpur.
- Vishvanath Singh Smarak Degree College, Rahwan.
- ABS Public School, Railway station Road Harchandpur
- BLPS Public School, Pili Kothi, HARCHANDPUR
- Saraswati gyan Mandir Railway station road near Harchandpur
- Veena Vadni Gyan Mandir Harchandpur

== Temples ==
- Aastik Baba Temple, Lalupur
- Achleshwar Dham, Achleshwar Market (Rahwan)
- Maa Hulka Mandir, Baragadaha
- Sevareshwar Temple, Seonthi
- Shani Temple, Harchandpur
- Hanuman Mandir

== Villages ==
Harchandpur CD block has the following 80 villages:

Village name	Total land area (hectares)	Population (in 2011)
Tera Baraula	599.2	3,264
Ufarapur	158	1,494
Pasi Tusi	91.5	645
Pashchhim Gaon	811.6	5,644
Madan Tusi	270.5	995
Nanda Khera	139.7	1,777
Aghaura	457	1,836
Sarai Umar	464	2,434
Johwa Sharki	1,934.9	10,657
Johwahisar	229.3	1,692
Kamkeypur	133.1	805
Datauli	423.8	1,980
Seri	283.7	1,948
Piyarepur	383.4	2,434
Kanhat	114.7	596
Bala	710.1	4,123
Shobhapur	195.4	1,281
Malikpur Barna	156.6	901
Majhigavan Hardoi	221.4	1,259
Salimpur Khas	291.5	1,701
Gunawar Kamegarpur	350.2	2,080
Pindori Sargahi	269.4	1,448
Kashau Khas	352.6	2,640
Paharpur Kasho	289.6	1,136
Kamalpur	132.5	760
Hidain	438.8	3,092
Kandaura	383.2	4,494
Teri Maniya Teekar	285.5	1,406
Harchandpur (block headquarters)	264.2	4,348
Hataiya	188.3	1,287
Kathwara	513.4	5,115
Mahmadmau	80.9	567
Didhaura Som Mau	553	4,019
Pandepur	326.2	1,738
Seonthi	435.1	3,075
Mohammadpur Dighaura	182.1	1,020
Itkuti	158.1	568
Lakhanapur	96.8	564
Ruknapur	119.1	1,139
Tengana	130.4	401
Khirijpur Karaundi	195.2	1,610
Ambahar	43.6	192
Bargadha	153.5	847
Hilalganj	246.8	1,114
Sohaliya	396.5	1,956
Sirsa	364	829
Antari	105.7	2
Para	214.7	2,142
Chak Sunda	111.5	1,223
Rahwan	588.3	4,292
Ghunsari	78.3	321
Hasanapur	89.2	674
Baldupur	85.4	607
Anguri	340.9	1,359
Harni	64.7	759
Kankhara	148	808
Faridpur	102.5	993
Mawaeya	99.6	553
Pandera	462	3,034
Kotiyamau	148.6	574
Guloopur	495.4	3,421
Ajmatulla Ganj	350.2	2,687
Chauhaniya	225.3	1,256
Arivar	207	1,596
Alipur Khalsa	70	570
Usmanpur	58.9	421
Majhigavan Karan	181.2	1,098
Khuchuma	90	521
Shora	408	3,935
Majhi Gavan Rao	215	1,699
Dhondhari	106	680
Laloopur Khas	174.5	1,126
Mubarakpur	246.6	1,326
Tanda	200.4	1,559
Daudpur	141	1,175
Paltu Tanda	81	414
Chhivla Mau	133	1,185
Chak Shekhoopur	9	14
Lohanipur	111	2,378
Maidanpur	70	961
