= Ghunsari =

- Village
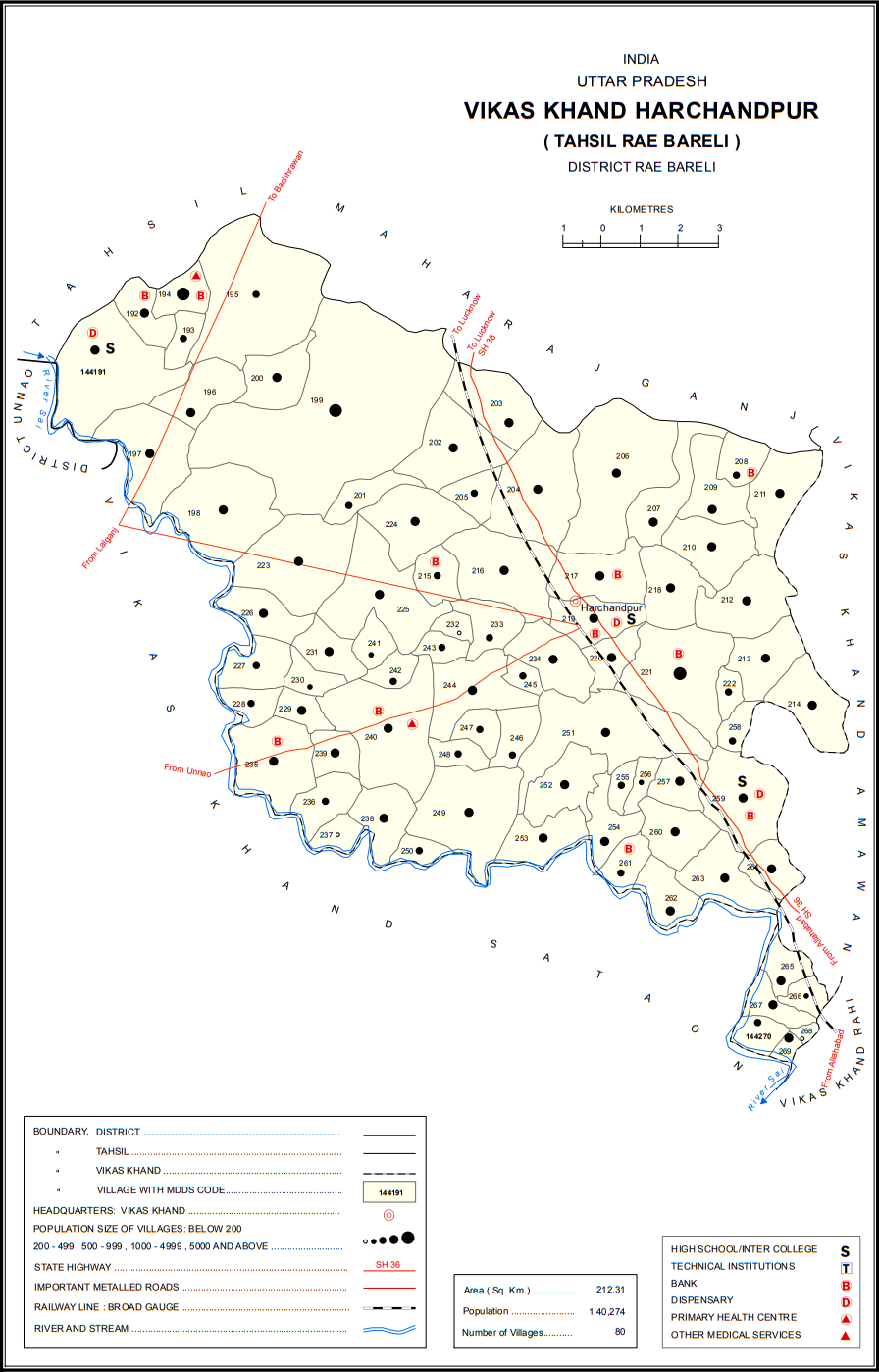
- Map showing Ghunsari (#241) in Harchandpur CD block

- Location in Uttar Pradesh, India
- Coordinates: 26.331819°N 81.111173°E
- Country India: India
- State: Uttar Pradesh
- District: Raebareli

Area
  - Total: 0.783 km^{2} (0.302 sq mi)

Population (2011)
  - Total: 321
  - Density: 410/km^{2} (1,060/sq mi)

Languages
  - Official: Hindi
- Time zone: UTC+5:30 (IST)
- Vehicle registration: UP-35

Ghunsari is a village in Harchandpur block of Rae Bareli district, Uttar Pradesh, India. It is located 22 km from Raebareli, the district headquarters. As of 2011, its population is 321, in 74 households. It has one primary school and no healthcare facilities.

The 1961 census recorded Ghunsari (as "Ghonsari") as comprising 1 hamlet, with a total population of 187 people (94 male and 93 female), in 32 households and 29 physical houses. The area of the village was given as 200 acres.

The 1981 census recorded Ghunsari as having a population of 259 people, in 39 households, and having an area of 78.51 hectares. The main staple foods were given as wheat and rice.
