= Datauli, Raebareli =

Datauli
- Village
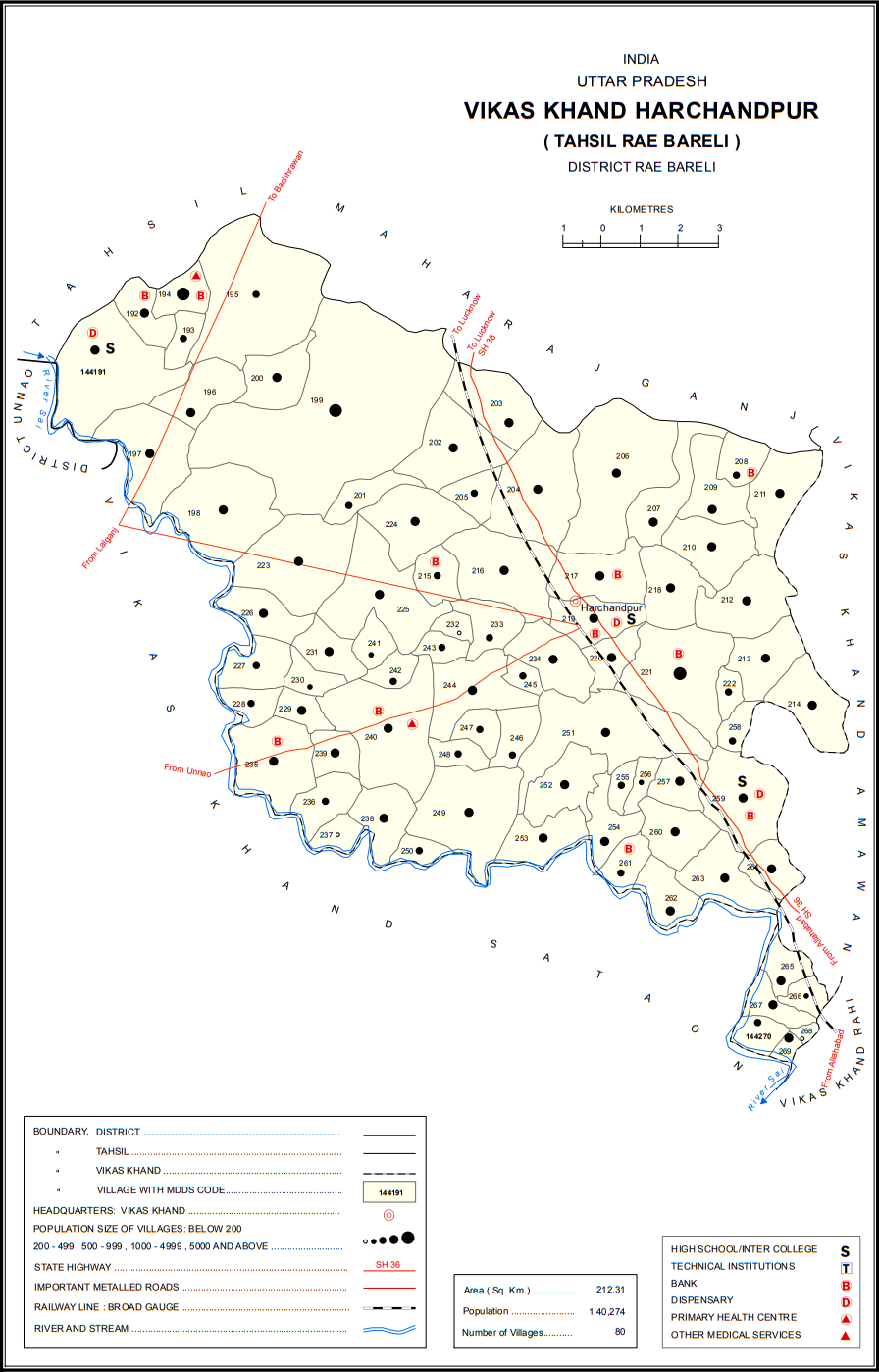
- Map showing Datauli (#202) in Harchandpur CD block

- Location in Uttar Pradesh, India
- Coordinates: 26.378063°N 81.139156°E
- Country India: India
- State: Uttar Pradesh
- District: Raebareli

Area
  - Total: 4.238 km^{2} (1.636 sq mi)

Population (2011)
  - Total: 1,980
  - Density: 467/km^{2} (1,210/sq mi)

Languages
  - Official: Hindi
- Time zone: UTC+5:30 (IST)
- Vehicle registration: UP-35

Datauli is a village in Harchandpur block of Rae Bareli district, Uttar Pradesh, India. As of 2011, its population is 1,980, in 357 households. It has one primary school and no healthcare facilities.

The 1961 census recorded Datauli as comprising 4 hamlets, with a total population of 822 people (442 male and 380 female), in 157 households and 140 physical houses. The area of the village was given as 1,049 acres.

The 1981 census recorded Datauli as having a population of 1,167 people, in 200 households, and having an area of 425.74 hectares. The main staple foods were given as wheat and rice.
