= Harni, Raebareli =

Harni
- Village
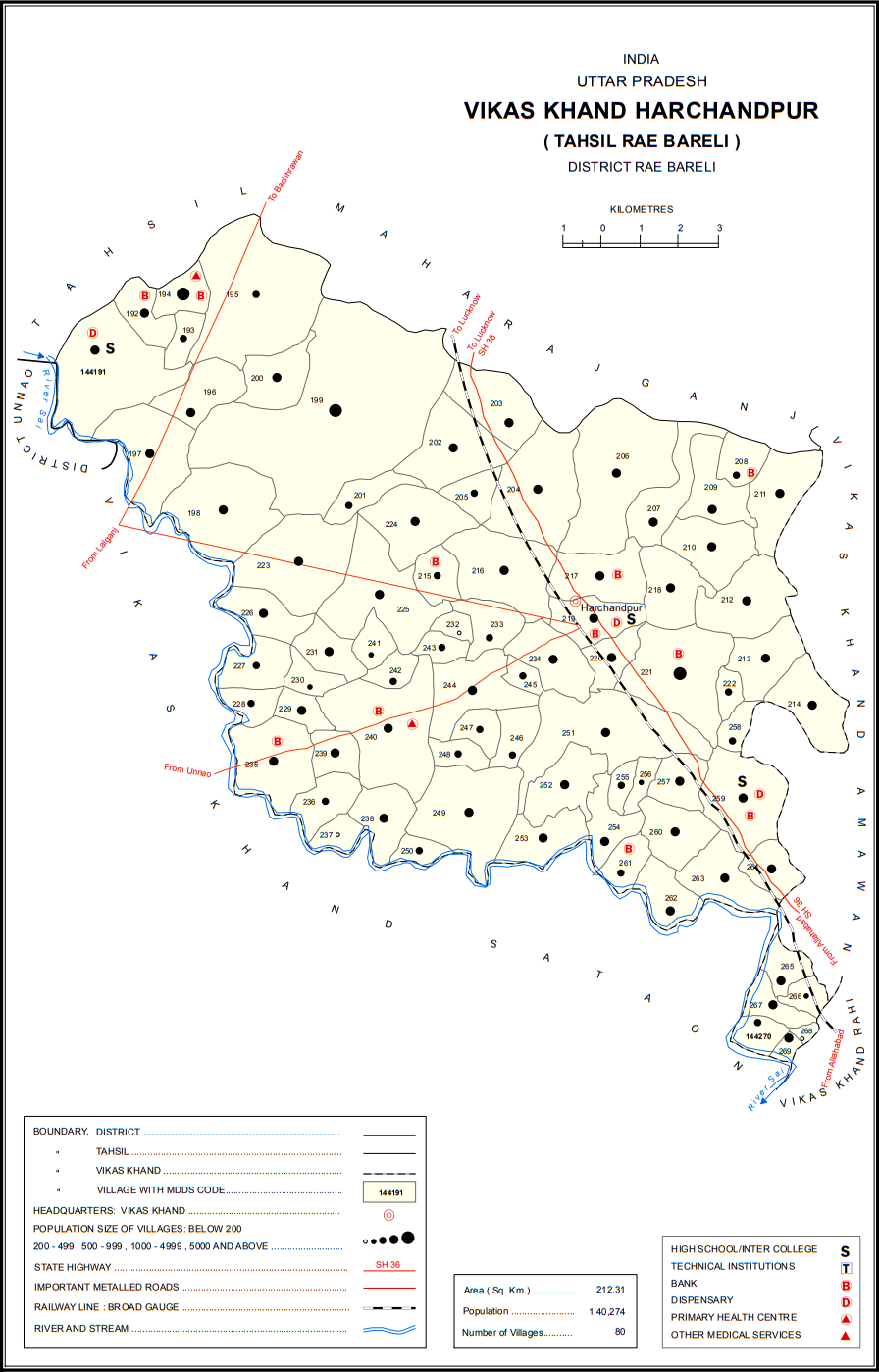
- Map showing Harni (#245) in Harchandpur CD block

- Location in Uttar Pradesh, India
- Coordinates: 26.322877°N 81.150394°E
- Country India: India
- State: Uttar Pradesh
- District: Raebareli

Area
  - Total: 0.647 km^{2} (0.250 sq mi)

Population (2011)
  - Total: 759
  - Density: 1,170/km^{2} (3,040/sq mi)

Languages
  - Official: Hindi
- Time zone: UTC+5:30 (IST)
- Vehicle registration: UP-35

Harni is a village in Harchandpur block of Rae Bareli district, Uttar Pradesh, India. As of 2011, its population is 759, in 140 households. It has one primary school and no healthcare facilities.

The 1961 census recorded Harni as comprising 1 hamlet, with a total population of 267 people (140 male and 127 female), in 49 households and 44 physical houses. The area of the village was given as 160 acres.

The 1981 census recorded Harni as having a population of 382 people, in 64 households, and having an area of 344.80 hectares. The main staple foods were given as wheat and juwar.
