= Ruknapur =

Ruknapur Ruknāpur
- Village
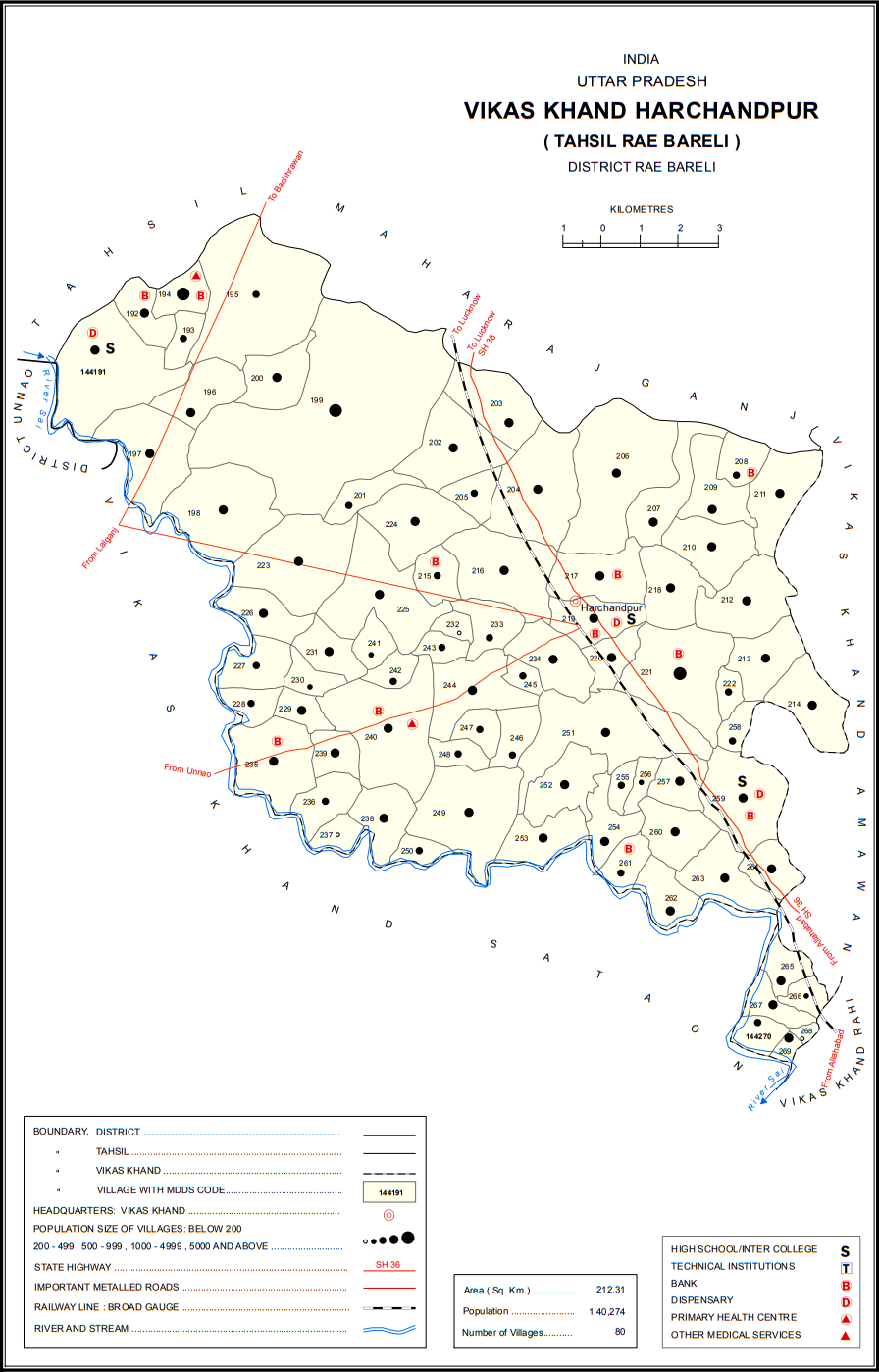
- Map showing Ruknapur (#229) in Harchandpur CD block

- Location in Uttar Pradesh, India
- Coordinates: 26.318473°N 81.089031°E
- Country India: India
- State: Uttar Pradesh
- District: Raebareli

Area
  - Total: 1.191 km^{2} (0.460 sq mi)

Population (2011)
  - Total: 1,139
  - Density: 956.3/km^{2} (2,477/sq mi)

Languages
  - Official: Hindi
- Time zone: UTC+5:30 (IST)
- PIN: 229308
- Vehicle registration: UP-35

Ruknapur is a village in Harchandpur block of Rae Bareli district, Uttar Pradesh, India. As of 2011, its population is 1,139, in 167 households. It has two primary schools and no healthcare facilities.

The 1961 census recorded Ruknapur as comprising 1 hamlet, with a total population of 482 people (257 male and 225 female), in 96 households and 84 physical houses. The area of the village was given as 301 acres.

The 1981 census recorded Ruknapur as having a population of 680 people, in 120 households, and having an area of 119.79 hectares. The main staple foods were listed as wheat and juwar.
