= Pasi Tusi =

Pasi Tusi Pāsi Tusi
- Village
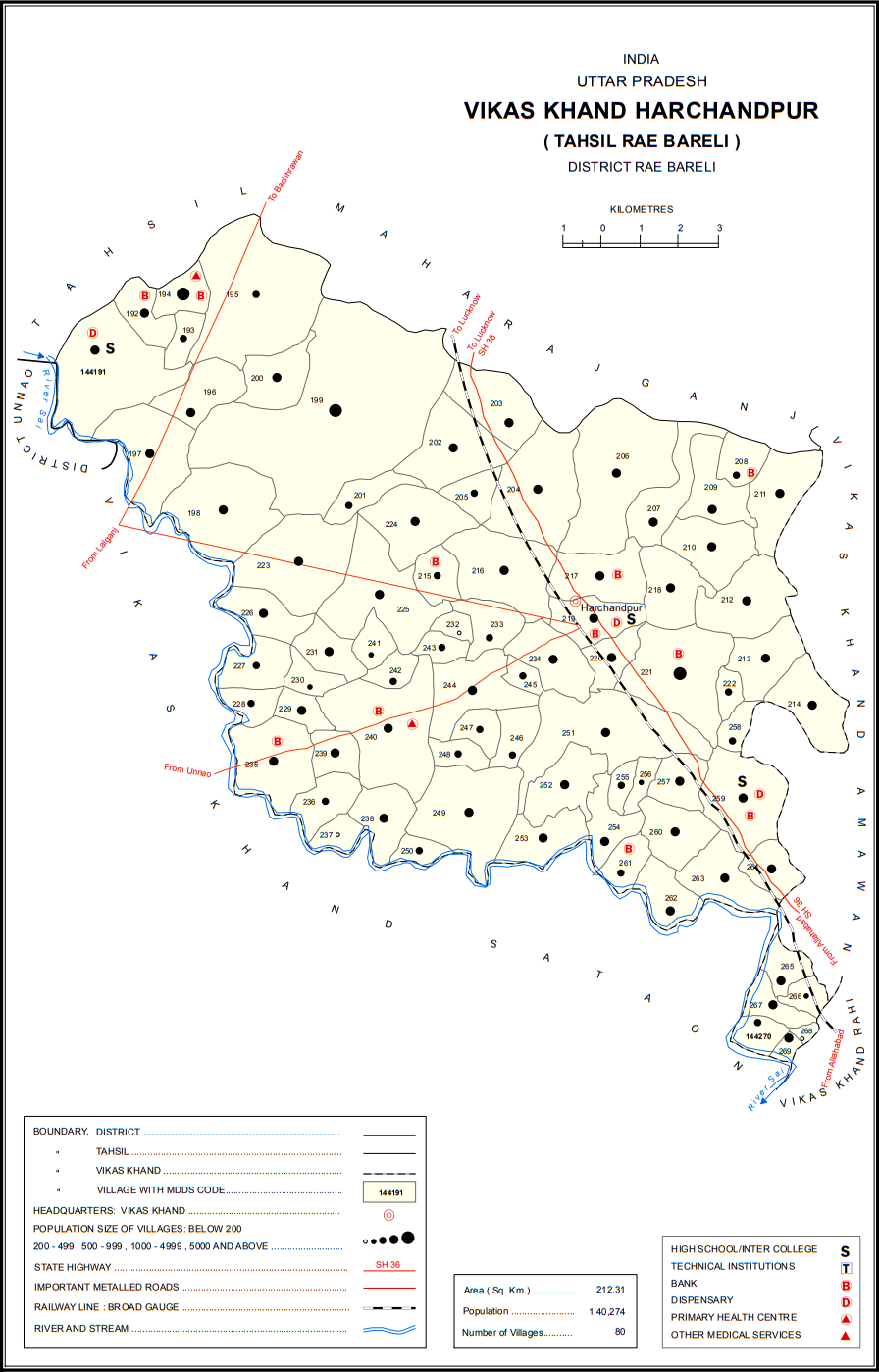
- Map showing Pasi Tusi (#195) in Harchandpur CD block

- Location in Uttar Pradesh, India
- Coordinates: 26.402858°N 81.067981°E
- Country India: India
- State: Uttar Pradesh
- District: Raebareli

Area
  - Total: 0.915 km^{2} (0.353 sq mi)

Population (2011)
  - Total: 645
  - Density: 705/km^{2} (1,830/sq mi)

Languages
  - Official: Hindi
- Time zone: UTC+5:30 (IST)
- Vehicle registration: UP-35

Pasi Tusi is a village in Harchandpur block of Rae Bareli district, Uttar Pradesh, India. As of 2011, its population is 645, in 125 households. It has no schools and no healthcare facilities.

The 1961 census recorded Pasi Tusi as comprising 1 hamlet, with a total population of 264 people (132 male and 132 female), in 45 households and 44 physical houses. The area of the village was given as 221 acres.

The 1981 census recorded Pasi Tusi as having a population of 387 people, in 66 households, and having an area of 91.46 hectares. The main staple foods were given as wheat and rice.
