= Bala, Raebareli =

Bala Bāla
- Village
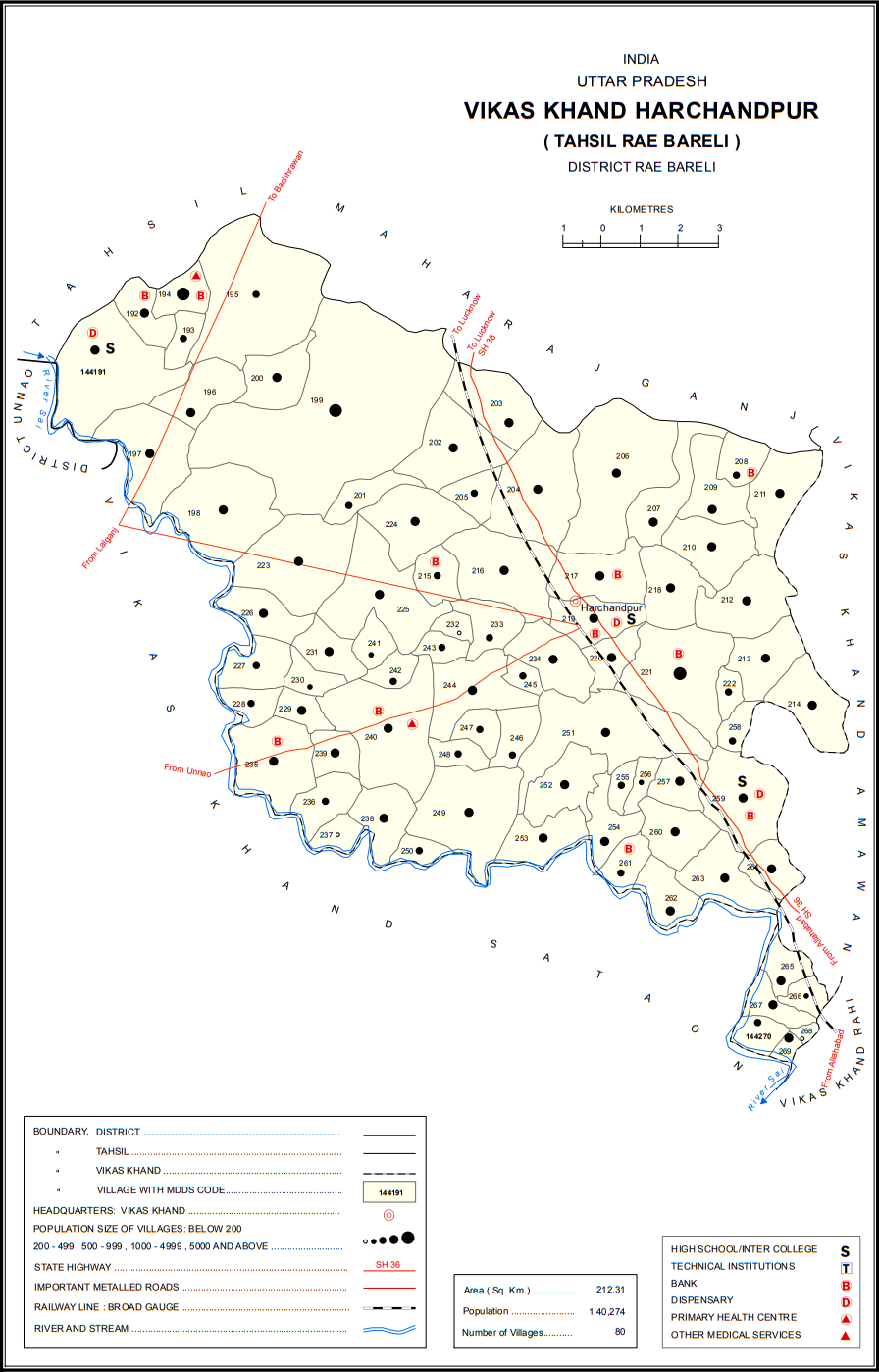
- Map showing Bala (#206) in Harchandpur CD block

- Location in Uttar Pradesh, India
- Coordinates: 26.376523°N 81.172821°E
- Country India: India
- State: Uttar Pradesh
- District: Raebareli

Area
  - Total: 7.101 km^{2} (2.742 sq mi)

Population (2011)
  - Total: 4,123
  - Density: 580.6/km^{2} (1,504/sq mi)

Languages
  - Official: Hindi
- Time zone: UTC+5:30 (IST)
- Vehicle registration: UP-35

Bala is a village in Harchandpur block of Rae Bareli district, Uttar Pradesh, India. As of 2011, its population is 4,123, in 801 households. It has one primary school and no healthcare facilities.

The 1961 census recorded Bala as comprising 8 hamlets, with a total population of 1,743 people (825 male and 918 female), in 379 households and 374 physical houses. The area of the village was given as 1,783 acres.

The 1981 census recorded Bala as having a population of 2,183 people, in 452 households, and having an area of 640.24 hectares. The main staple foods were given as wheat and barley.
