= Alipur Khalsa =

- Village
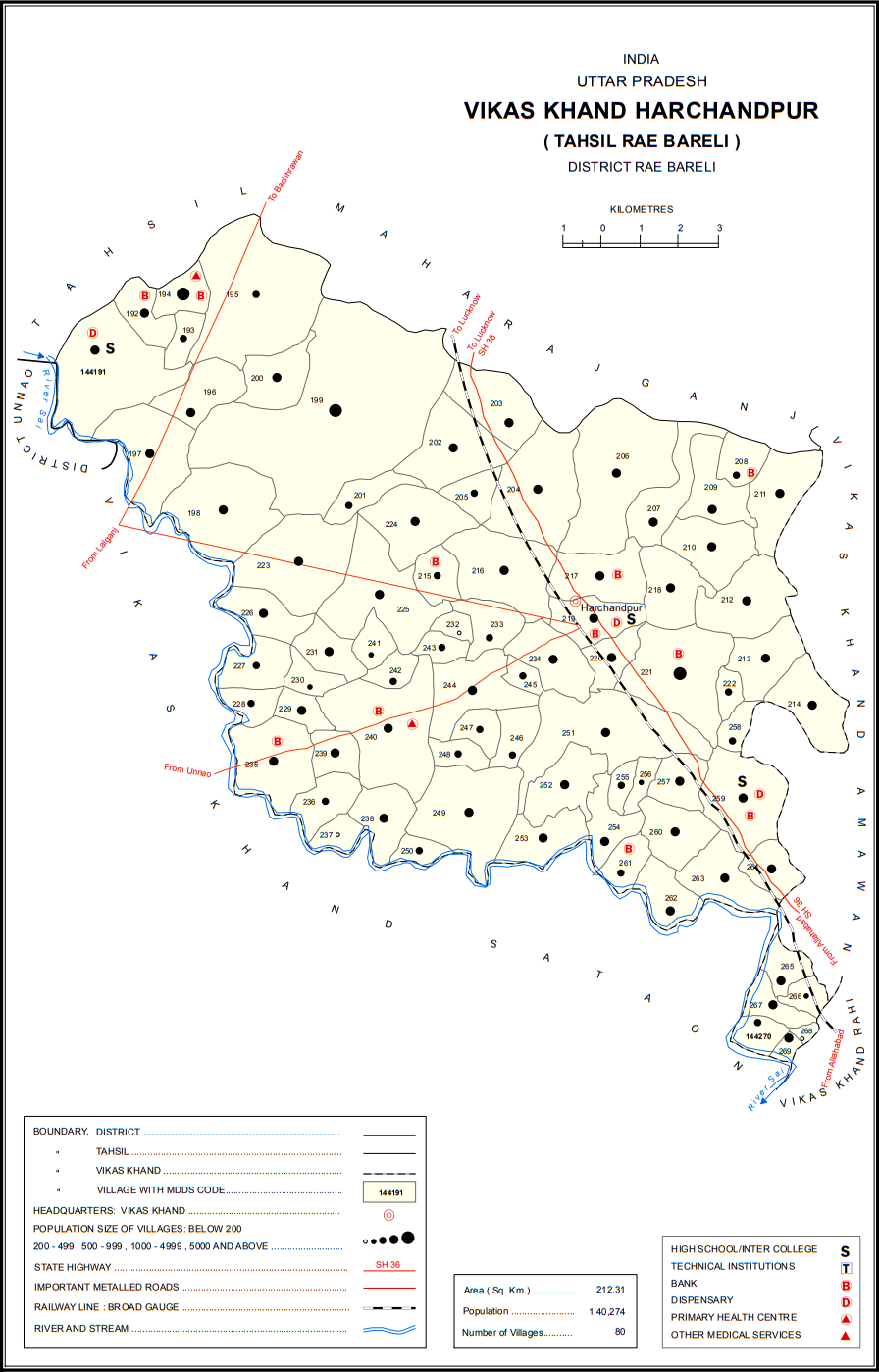
- Map showing Alipur Khalsa (#255) in Harchandpur CD block

- Location in Uttar Pradesh, India
- Coordinates: 26.296391°N 81.1772°E
- Country India: India
- State: Uttar Pradesh
- District: Raebareli

Area
  - Total: 0.70 km^{2} (0.27 sq mi)

Population (2011)
  - Total: 570
  - Density: 810/km^{2} (2,100/sq mi)

Languages
  - Official: Hindi
- Time zone: UTC+5:30 (IST)
- Vehicle registration: UP-35

Alipur Khalsa is a village in Harchandpur block of Rae Bareli district, Uttar Pradesh, India. It is located 5 km from Raebareli, the district headquarters. As of 2011, its population is 570, in 114 households. It has no schools and no healthcare facilities.

The 1961 census recorded Alipur Khalsa as comprising 1 hamlet, with a total population of 281 people (144 male and 137 female), in 148 households and 141 physical houses. The area of the village was given as 165 acres.

The 1981 census recorded Alipur Khalsa as having a population of 340 people, in 70 households, and having an area of 70.01 hectares. The main staple foods were given as wheat and rice.
