= Chak Sunda =

- Village
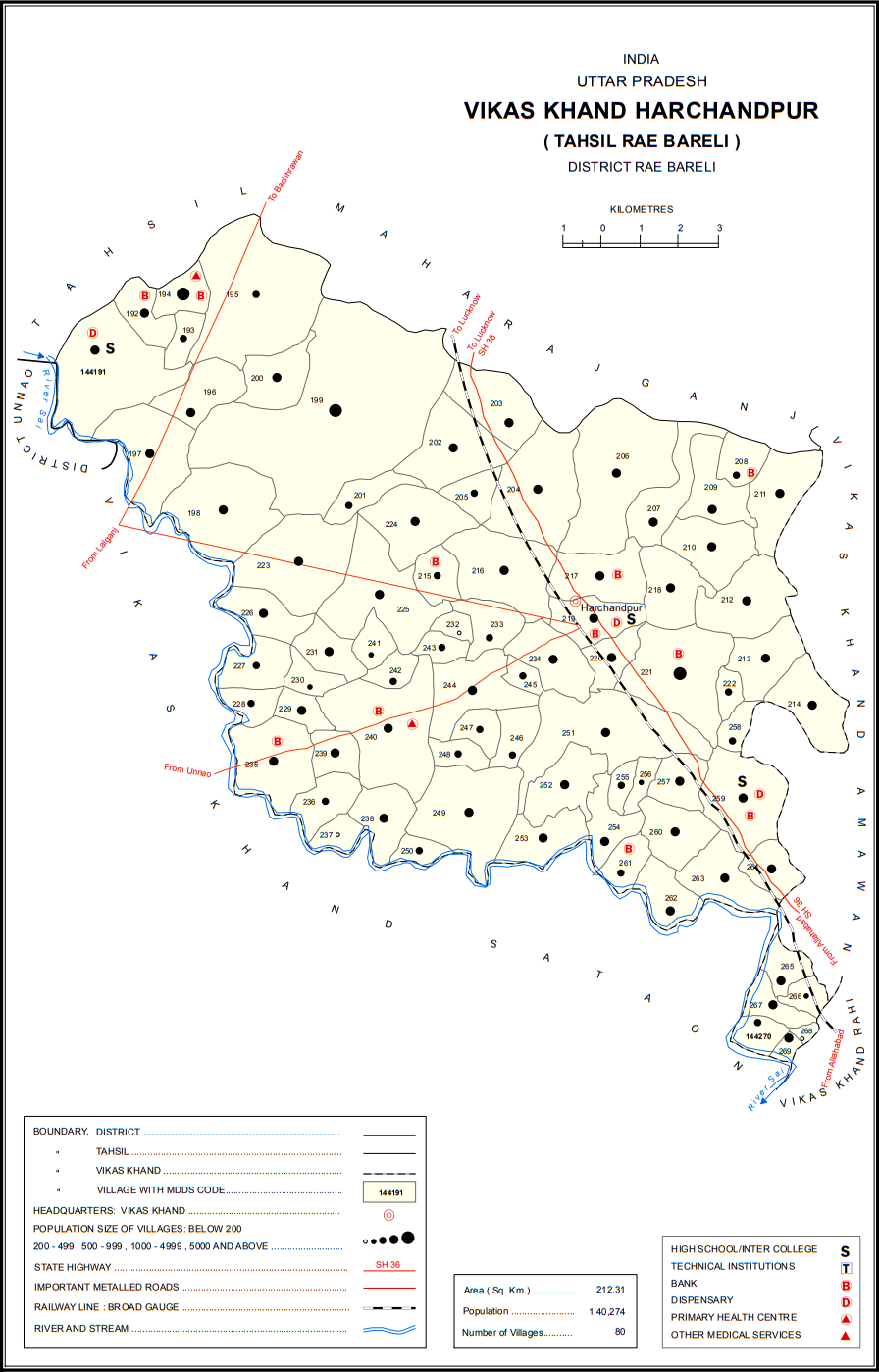
- Map showing Chak Sunda (#239) in Harchandpur CD block

- Location in Uttar Pradesh, India
- Coordinates: 26.30699°N 81.107779°E
- Country India: India
- State: Uttar Pradesh
- District: Raebareli

Area
  - Total: 1.115 km^{2} (0.431 sq mi)

Population (2011)
  - Total: 1,223
  - Density: 1,097/km^{2} (2,841/sq mi)

Languages
  - Official: Hindi
- Time zone: UTC+5:30 (IST)
- PIN: 229308
- Vehicle registration: UP-35

Chak Sunda is a village in Harchandpur block of Rae Bareli district, Uttar Pradesh, India. As of 2011, its population is 1,223, in 204 households. It has one primary school and no healthcare facilities.

The 1961 census recorded Chak Sunda as comprising 3 hamlets, with a total population of 594 people (306 male and 288 female), in 103 households and 103 physical houses. The area of the village was given as 279 acres.

The 1981 census recorded Chak Sunda as having a population of 838 people, in 123 households, and having an area of 105.63 hectares.
