= Lohanipur =

Lohanipur Lohānipur
- Village
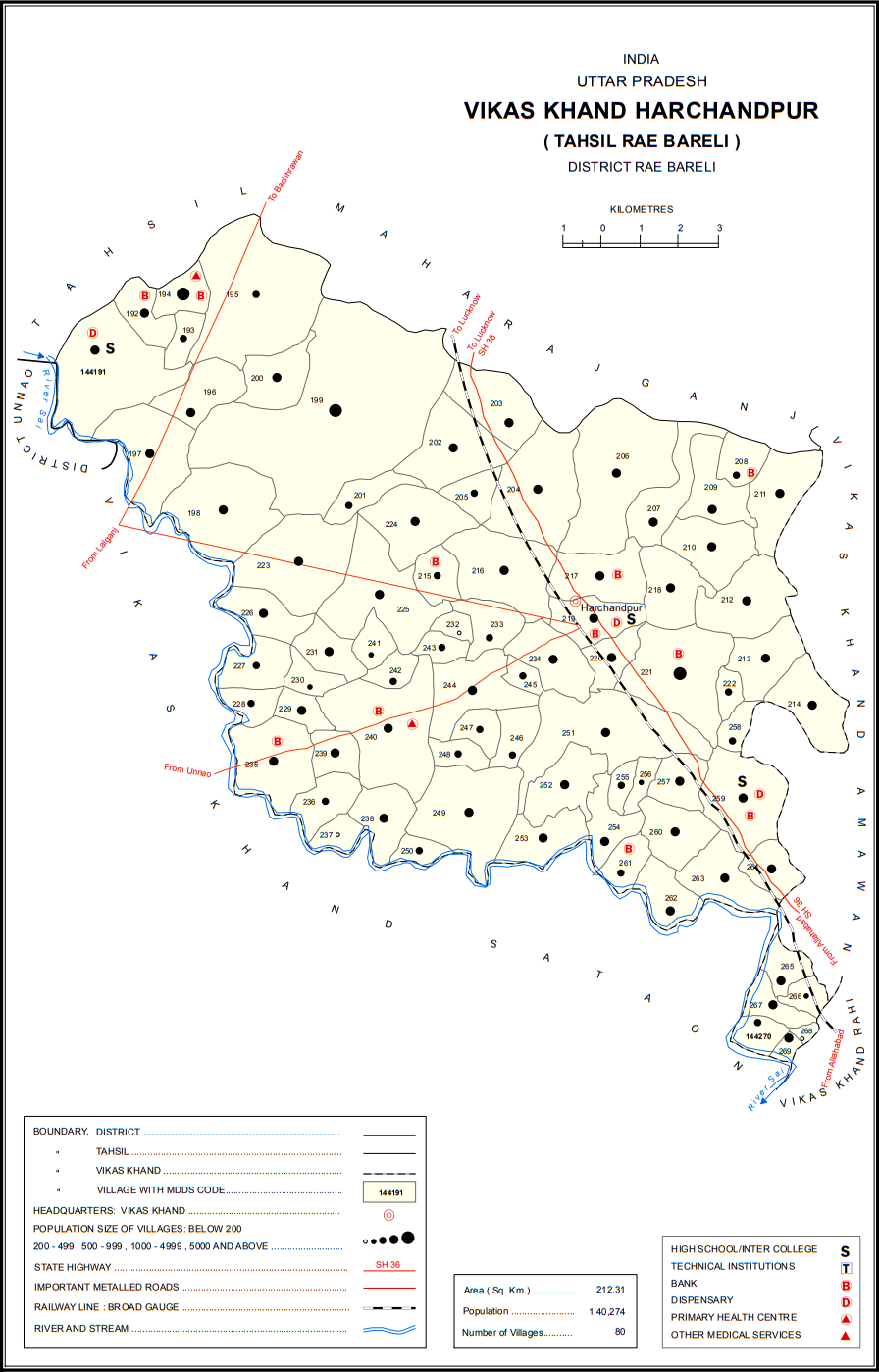
- Map showing Lohanipur (#269) in Harchandpur CD block

- Location in Uttar Pradesh, India
- Coordinates: 26.236634°N 81.21929°E
- Country India: India
- State: Uttar Pradesh
- District: Raebareli

Area
  - Total: 1.11 km^{2} (0.43 sq mi)

Population (2011)
  - Total: 2,378
  - Density: 2,140/km^{2} (5,550/sq mi)

Languages
  - Official: Hindi
- Time zone: UTC+5:30 (IST)
- Vehicle registration: UP-35

Lohanipur is a village in Harchandpur block of Rae Bareli district, Uttar Pradesh, India. It is located 4 km from Raebareli, the district headquarters. As of 2011, its population is 2,378, in 433 households.

The 1961 census recorded Lohanipur as comprising 4 hamlets, with a total population of 859 people (434 male and 425 female), in 195 households and 162 physical houses. The area of the village was given as 293 acres.

The 1981 census recorded Lohanipur (as "Lohinipur") as having a population of 935, people, in 195 households, and having an area of 160.06 hectares. The main staple foods were given as wheat and gram.
