= Nanda Khera =

- Village
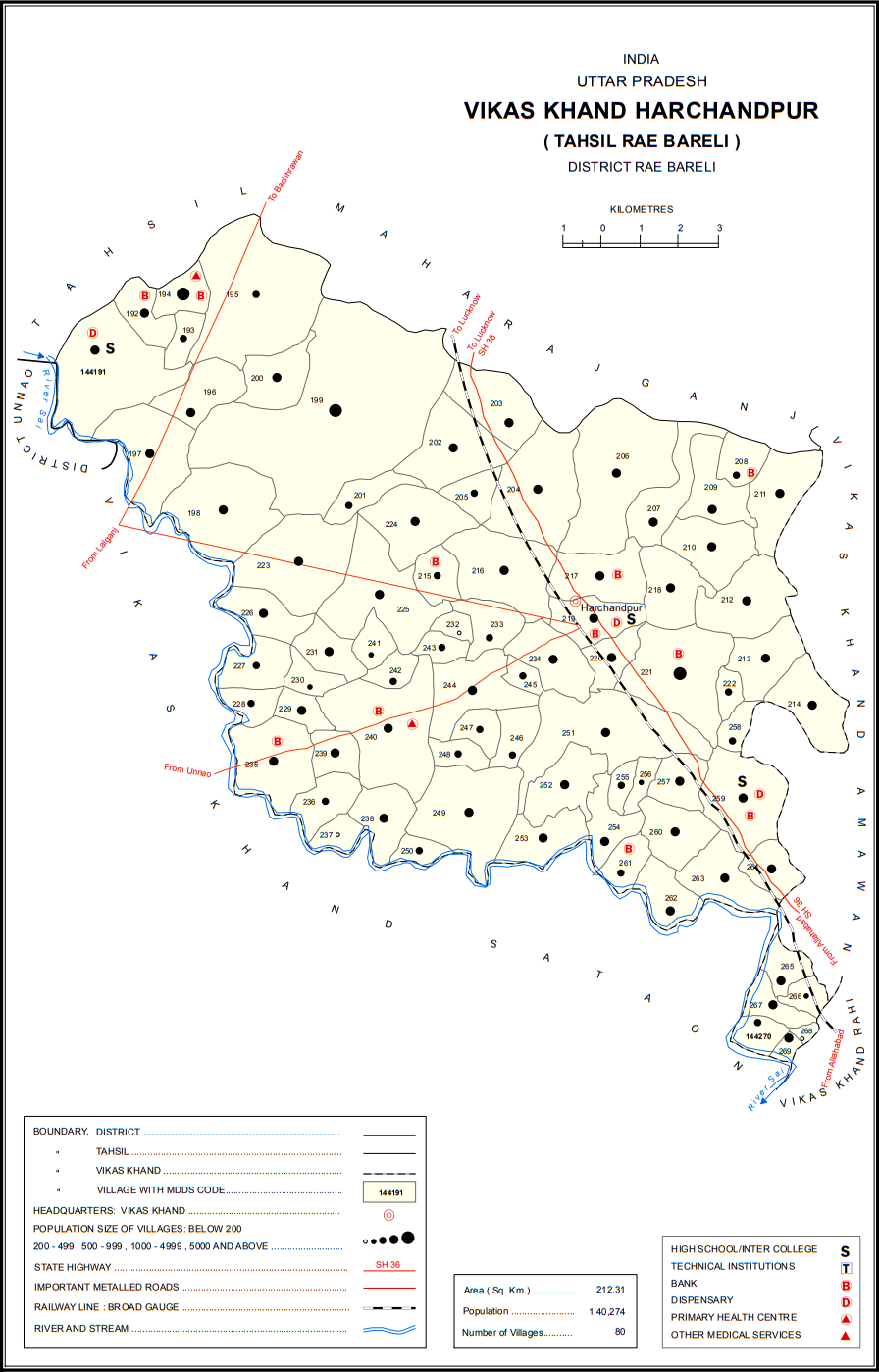
- Map showing Nanda Khera (#196) in Harchandpur CD block

- Location in Uttar Pradesh, India
- Coordinates: 26.389269°N 81.066715°E
- Country India: India
- State: Uttar Pradesh
- District: Raebareli

Area
  - Total: 1.397 km^{2} (0.539 sq mi)

Population (2011)
  - Total: 1,777
  - Density: 1,272/km^{2} (3,294/sq mi)

Languages
  - Official: Hindi
- Time zone: UTC+5:30 (IST)
- Vehicle registration: UP-35

Nanda Khera is a village in Harchandpur block of Rae Bareli district, Uttar Pradesh, India. As of 2011, its population is 1,777, in 364 households. It has one primary school and no healthcare facilities.

The 1961 census recorded Nanda Khera as comprising 2 hamlets, with a total population of 595 people (294 male and 301 female), in 141 households and 127 physical houses. The area of the village was given as 671 acres.

The 1981 census recorded Nanda Khera as having a population of 863 people, in 182 households, and having an area of 270.34 hectares. The main staple foods were given as wheat and rice.
