= Tera Baraula =

- Village
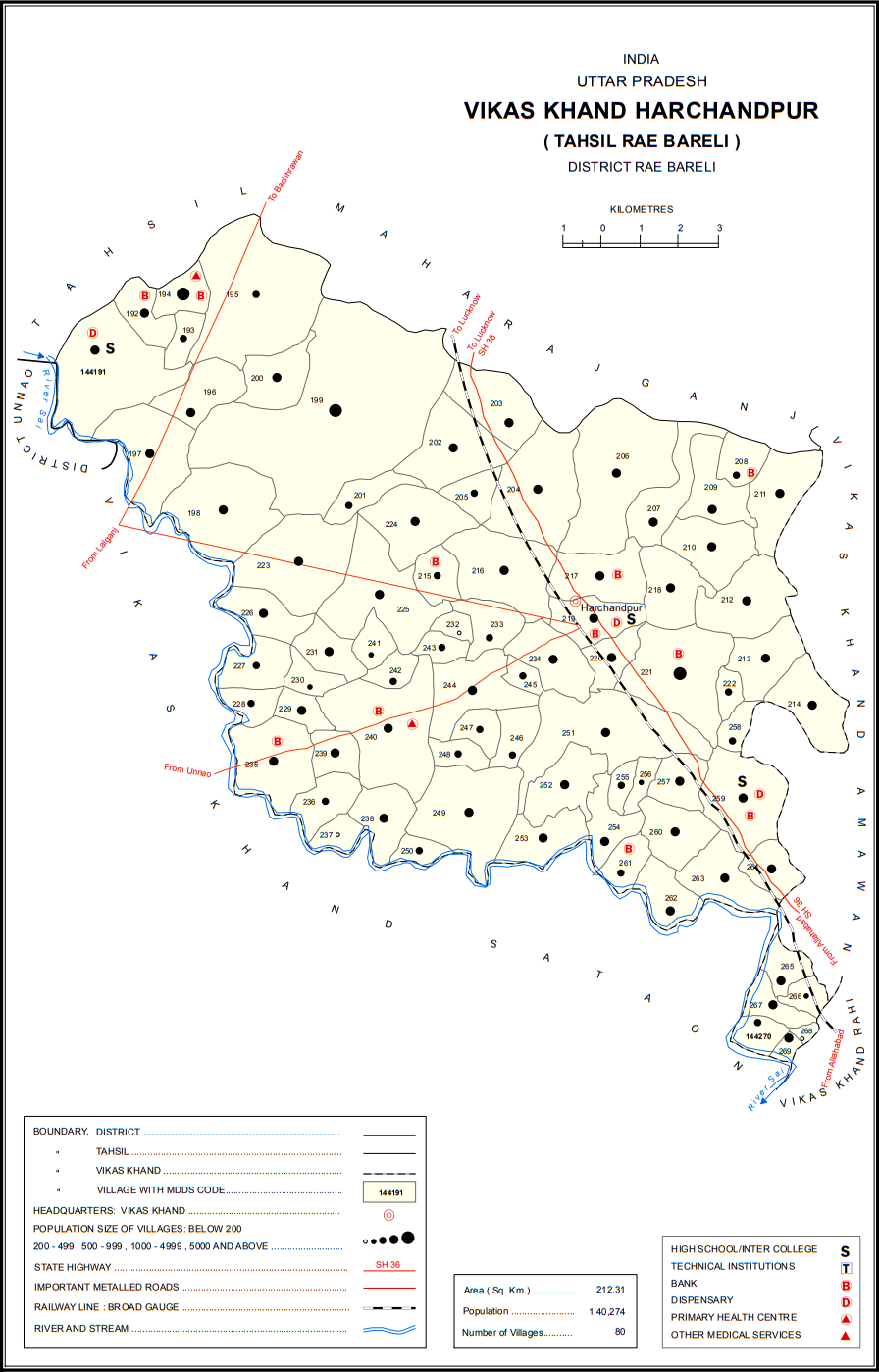
- Map showing Tera Baraula (#144191) in Harchandpur CD block

- Location in Uttar Pradesh, India
- Coordinates: 26.390614°N 81.037833°E
- Country India: India
- State: Uttar Pradesh
- District: Raebareli

Area
  - Total: 5.992 km^{2} (2.314 sq mi)

Population (2011)
  - Total: 3,264
  - Density: 544.7/km^{2} (1,411/sq mi)

Languages
  - Official: Hindi
- Time zone: UTC+5:30 (IST)
- Vehicle registration: UP-35

Tera Baraula is a village in Harchandpur block of Rae Bareli district, Uttar Pradesh, India. As of 2011, its population is 3,264, in 596 households. It has one primary school and no healthcare facilities.

The 1961 census recorded Tera Baraula as comprising 7 hamlets, with a total population of 1,099 people (537 male and 562 female), in 243 households and 231 physical houses. The area of the village was given as 1,482 acres.

The 1981 census recorded Tera Baraula as having a population of 1,690 people, in 335 households, and having an area of 599.36 hectares. The main staple foods were given as wheat and barley.
