= Baldupur =

- Village
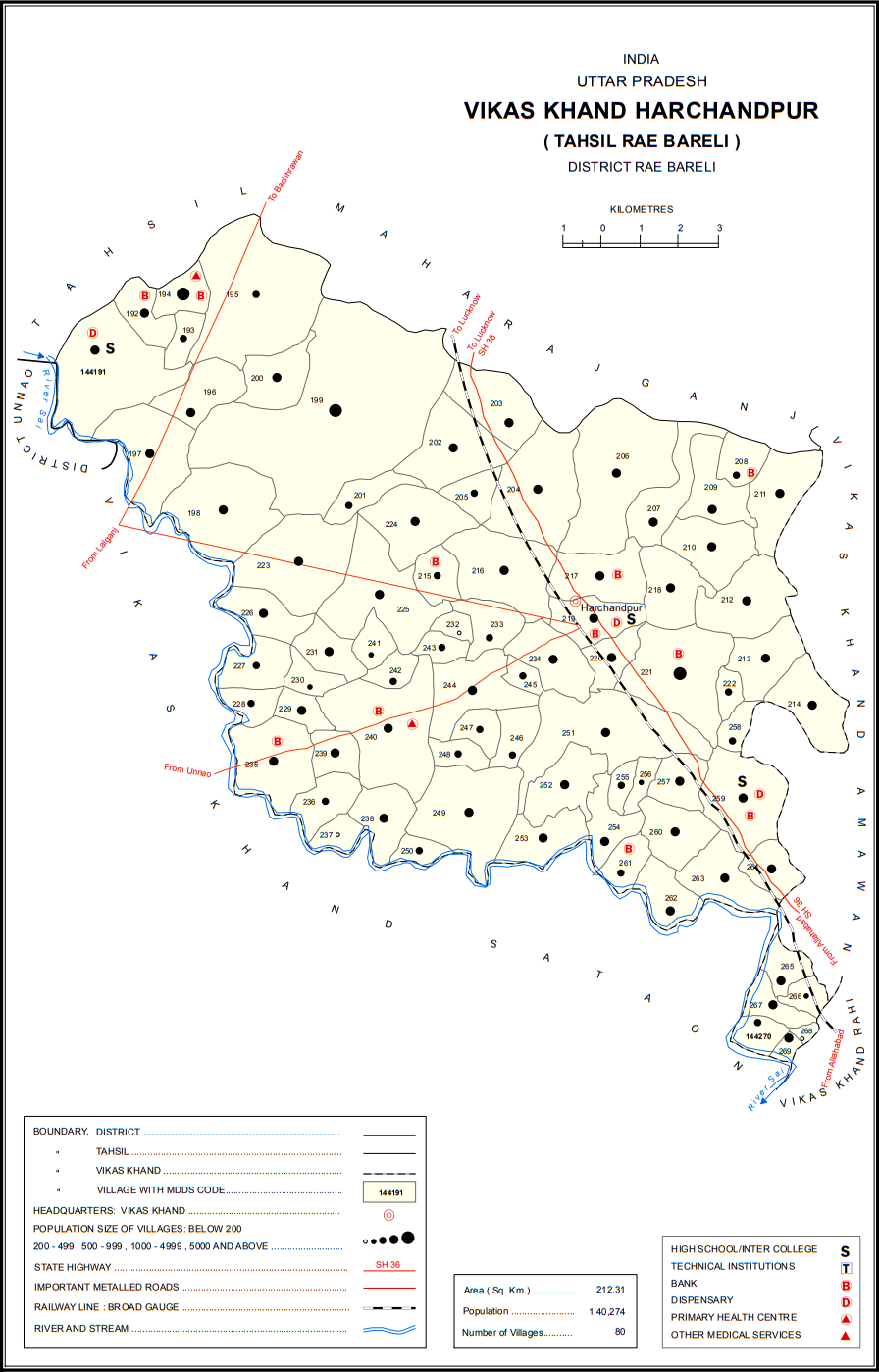
- Map showing Baldupur (#243) in Harchandpur CD block

- Location in Uttar Pradesh, India
- Coordinates: 26.328532°N 81.131964°E
- Country India: India
- State: Uttar Pradesh
- District: Raebareli

Area
  - Total: 0.854 km^{2} (0.330 sq mi)

Population (2011)
  - Total: 607
  - Density: 711/km^{2} (1,840/sq mi)

Languages
  - Official: Hindi
- Time zone: UTC+5:30 (IST)
- Vehicle registration: UP-35

Baldupur is a village in Harchandpur block of Rae Bareli district, Uttar Pradesh, India. As of 2011, its population is 607, in 108 households. It has one primary school and no healthcare facilities.

The 1961 census recorded Baldupur as comprising 2 hamlets, with a total population of 204 people (96 male and 108 female), in 36 households and 33 physical houses. The area of the village was given as 220 acres.

The 1981 census recorded Baldupur as having a population of 342 people, in 55 households, and having an area of 85.39 hectares. The main staple foods were given as wheat and rice.
