= Aghaura =

- Village
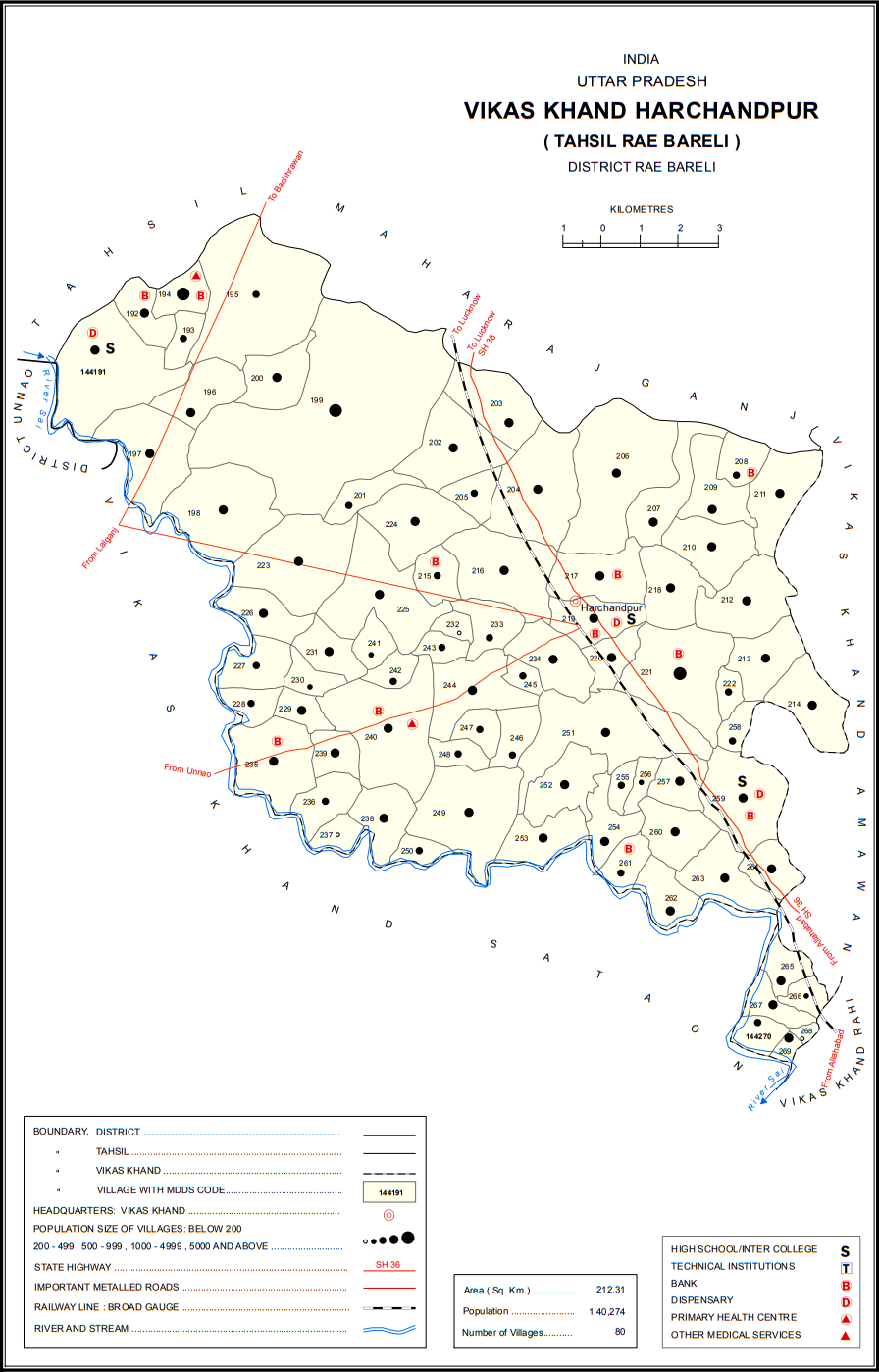
- Map showing Aghaura (#197) in Harchandpur CD block

- Location in Uttar Pradesh, India
- Coordinates: 26.375717°N 81.055254°E
- Country India: India
- State: Uttar Pradesh
- District: Raebareli

Area
  - Total: 4.57 km^{2} (1.76 sq mi)

Population (2011)
  - Total: 1,836
  - Density: 402/km^{2} (1,040/sq mi)

Languages
  - Official: Hindi
- Time zone: UTC+5:30 (IST)
- Vehicle registration: UP-35

Aghaura is a village in Harchandpur block of Rae Bareli district, Uttar Pradesh, India. As of 2011, its population is 1,836, in 347 households. It has one primary school and no healthcare facilities.

The 1961 census recorded Aghaura as comprising 1 hamlet, with a total population of 607 people (329 male and 273 female), in 119 households and 116 physical houses. The area of the village was given as 1,430 acres.

The 1981 census recorded Aghaura as having a population of 1,000 people, in 170 households, and having an area of 472.69 hectares. The main staple foods were given as wheat and rice.
