= Ambahar =

Ambahar Ambāhār
- Village
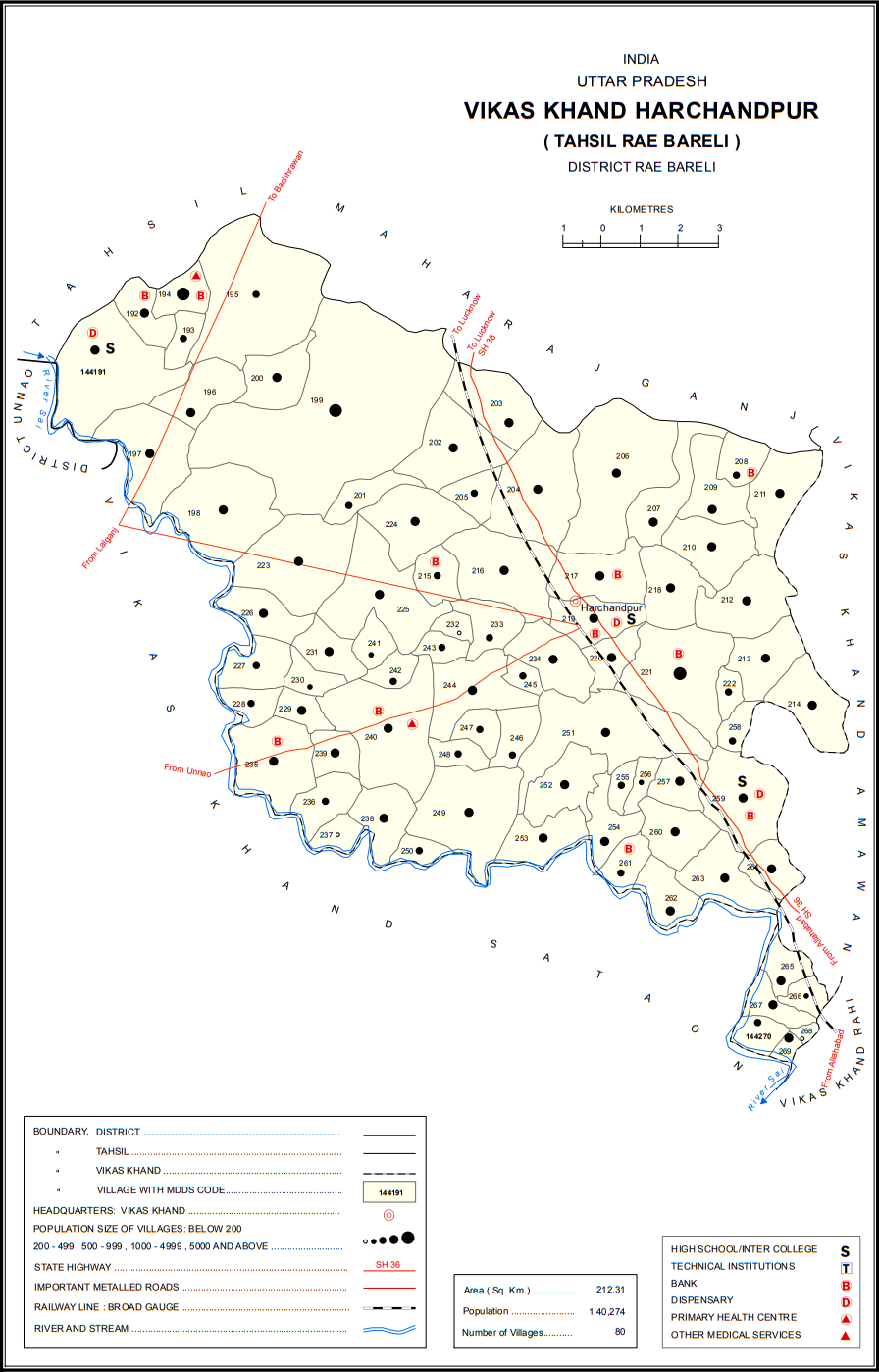
- Map showing Ambahar (#232) in Harchandpur CD block

- Location in Uttar Pradesh, India
- Coordinates: 26.335513°N 81.13265°E
- Country India: India
- State: Uttar Pradesh
- District: Raebareli

Area
  - Total: 0.436 km^{2} (0.168 sq mi)

Population (2011)
  - Total: 192
  - Density: 440/km^{2} (1,140/sq mi)

Languages
  - Official: Hindi
- Time zone: UTC+5:30 (IST)
- Vehicle registration: UP-35

Ambahar is a village in Harchandpur block of Rae Bareli district, Uttar Pradesh, India.

== Demographics ==
As of 2011, its population is 192, in 29 households. It has no schools and no healthcare facilities.

The 1961 census recorded Ambahar (here spelled "Anbahar") as comprising 2 hamlets, with a total population of 108 people (51 male and 57 female), in 23 households and 20 physical houses. The area of the village was given as 111 acres.

The 1981 census recorded Ambahar as having a population of 126 people, in 22 households, and having an area of 44.92 hectares. The main staple foods were given as wheat and rice.
