= Paharpur Kasho =

Paharpur Kasho Pahārpur Kāsho
- Village
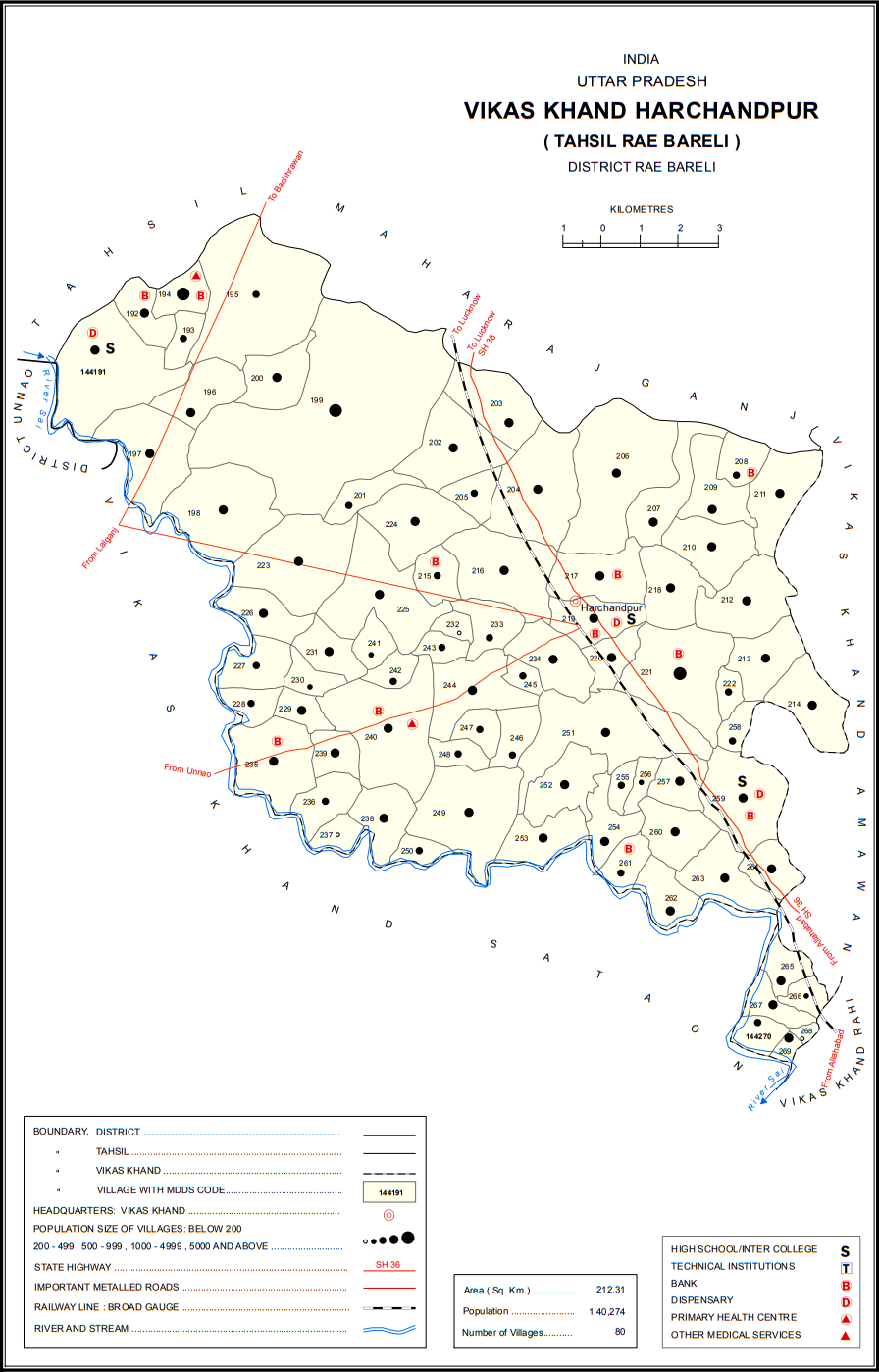
- Map showing Paharpur Kasho (#214) in Harchandpur CD block

- Location in Uttar Pradesh, India
- Coordinates: 26.323954°N 81.221124°E
- Country India: India
- State: Uttar Pradesh
- District: Raebareli

Area
  - Total: 2.896 km^{2} (1.118 sq mi)

Population (2011)
  - Total: 1,136
  - Density: 392.3/km^{2} (1,016/sq mi)

Languages
  - Official: Hindi
- Time zone: UTC+5:30 (IST)
- Vehicle registration: UP-35

Paharpur Kasho is a village in Harchandpur block of Rae Bareli district, Uttar Pradesh, India. It is located 13 km from Raebareli, the district headquarters. As of 2011, its population is 1,136, in 212 households. It has one primary school and no healthcare facilities.

The 1961 census recorded Paharpur Kasho (as "Paharpur Kaso") as comprising 3 hamlets, with a total population of 562 people (299 male and 263 female), in 131 households and 122 physical houses. The area of the village was given as 716 acres.

The 1981 census recorded Paharpur Kasho (as "Paharpur Kaso") as having a population of 803 people, in 149 households, and having an area of 289.77 hectares. The main staple foods were given as juwar and rice.
