= Kandaura =

- Gram Panchayat
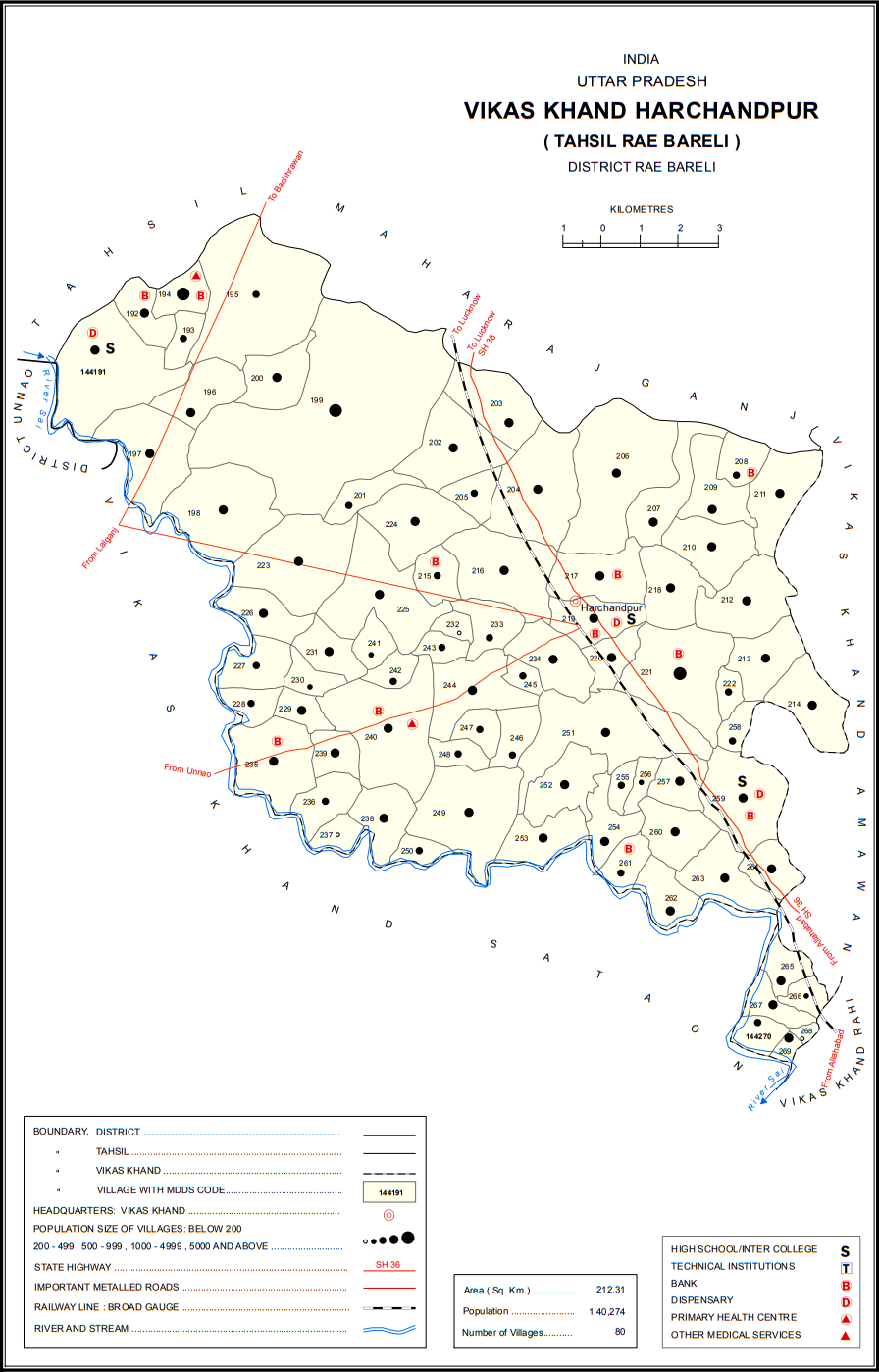
- Map showing Kandaura (#217) in Harchandpur CD block

- Location in Uttar Pradesh, India
- Coordinates: 26.36°N 81.17°E
- Country: India
- State: Uttar Pradesh
- District: Rae Bareli
- Block: Harchandpur
- Police Station: Harchandpur

Government
  - Type: Govt. Of Uttar Pradesh
  - CSC Officer: Mr. Dileep Kumar Singh

Area
  - Total: 3.832 km^{2} (1.480 sq mi)

Population (2011)
  - Total: 4,494

Languages
  - Official: Hindi
- Time zone: UTC+5:30 (IST)
- PIN: 229303
- Telephone code: +91-535
- Vehicle registration: UP-33
- Website: raebareli.nic.in

Kandaura is a village in Harchandpur block of Raebareli district, Uttar Pradesh, India. As of 2011, its population is 4,494, in 832 households. It has two primary schools and no healthcare facilities.

It is a gram panchayat with a Postal Index Number of 229303 and there are 5 villages under Kandaura. Kandaura is also a constituency under the district of Raebareli.

The 1961 census recorded Kandaura as comprising 7 hamlets, with a total population of 1,269 people (659 male and 610 female), in 155 households and 148 physical houses. The area of the village was given as 921 acres.

The 1981 census recorded Kandaura as having a population of 2,259 people, in 326 households, and having an area of 382.85 hectares. The main staple foods were given as wheat and rice.
