= Anguri, Harchandpur =

Anguri
- Village
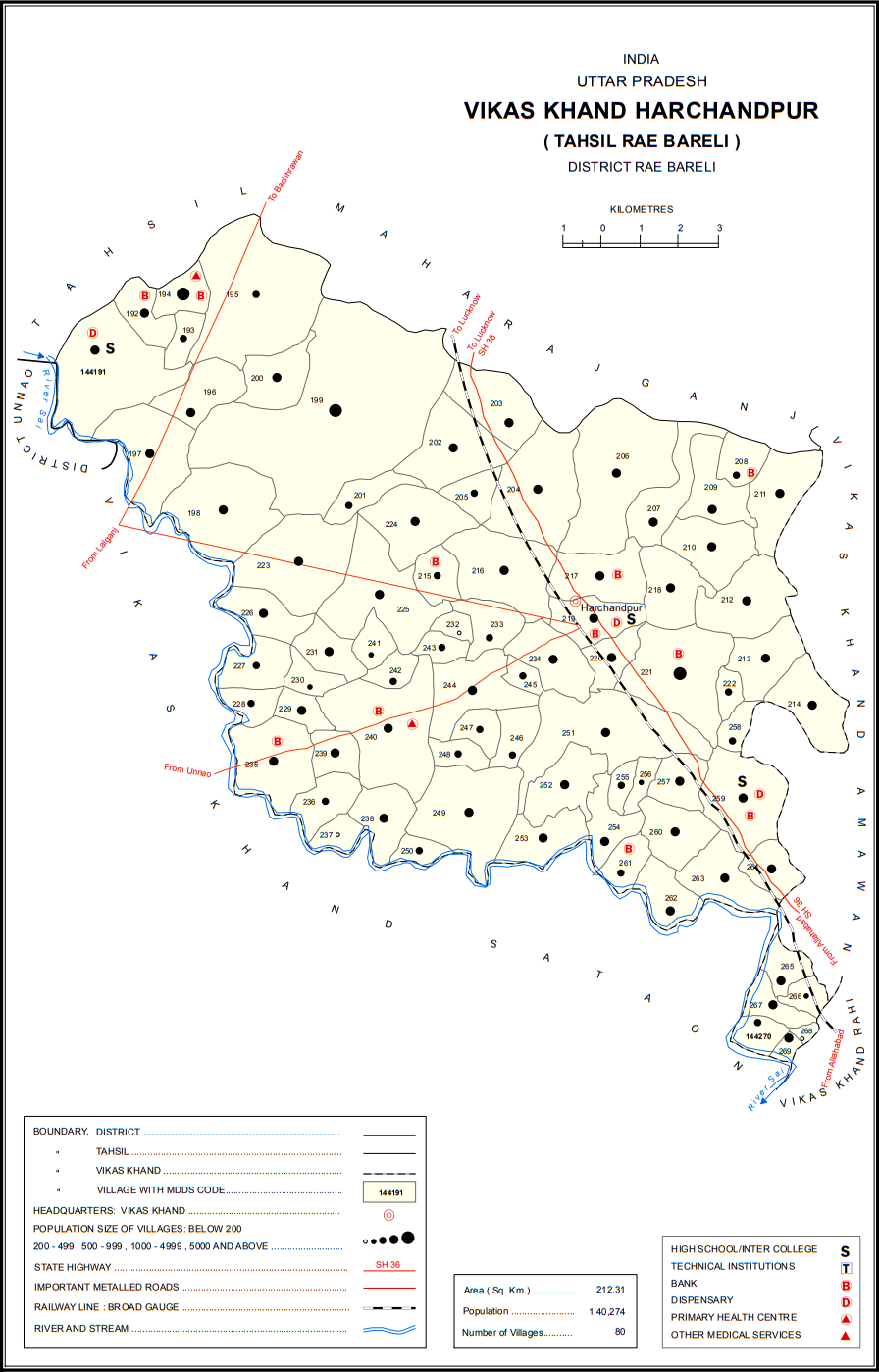
- Map showing Anguri (#244) in Harchandpur CD block

- Location in Uttar Pradesh, India
- Coordinates: 26.320724°N 81.130247°E
- Country India: India
- State: Uttar Pradesh
- District: Raebareli

Area
  - Total: 3.409 km^{2} (1.316 sq mi)

Population (2011)
  - Total: 1,359
  - Density: 398.7/km^{2} (1,033/sq mi)

Languages
  - Official: Hindi
- Time zone: UTC+5:30 (IST)
- PIN: 229308
- Vehicle registration: UP-35

Anguri is a village in Harchandpur block of Rae Bareli district, Uttar Pradesh, India. As of 2011, its population is 1,359, in 264 households. It has one primary school and no healthcare facilities.

The 1961 census recorded Anguri as comprising 2 hamlets, with a total population of 537 people (296 male and 241 female), in 122 households and 120 physical houses. The area of the village was given as 845 acres.

The 1981 census recorded Anguri as having a population of 837 people, in 154 households, and having an area of 65.16 hectares. The main staple foods were listed as wheat and juwar.
