= Bargadha =

- Village
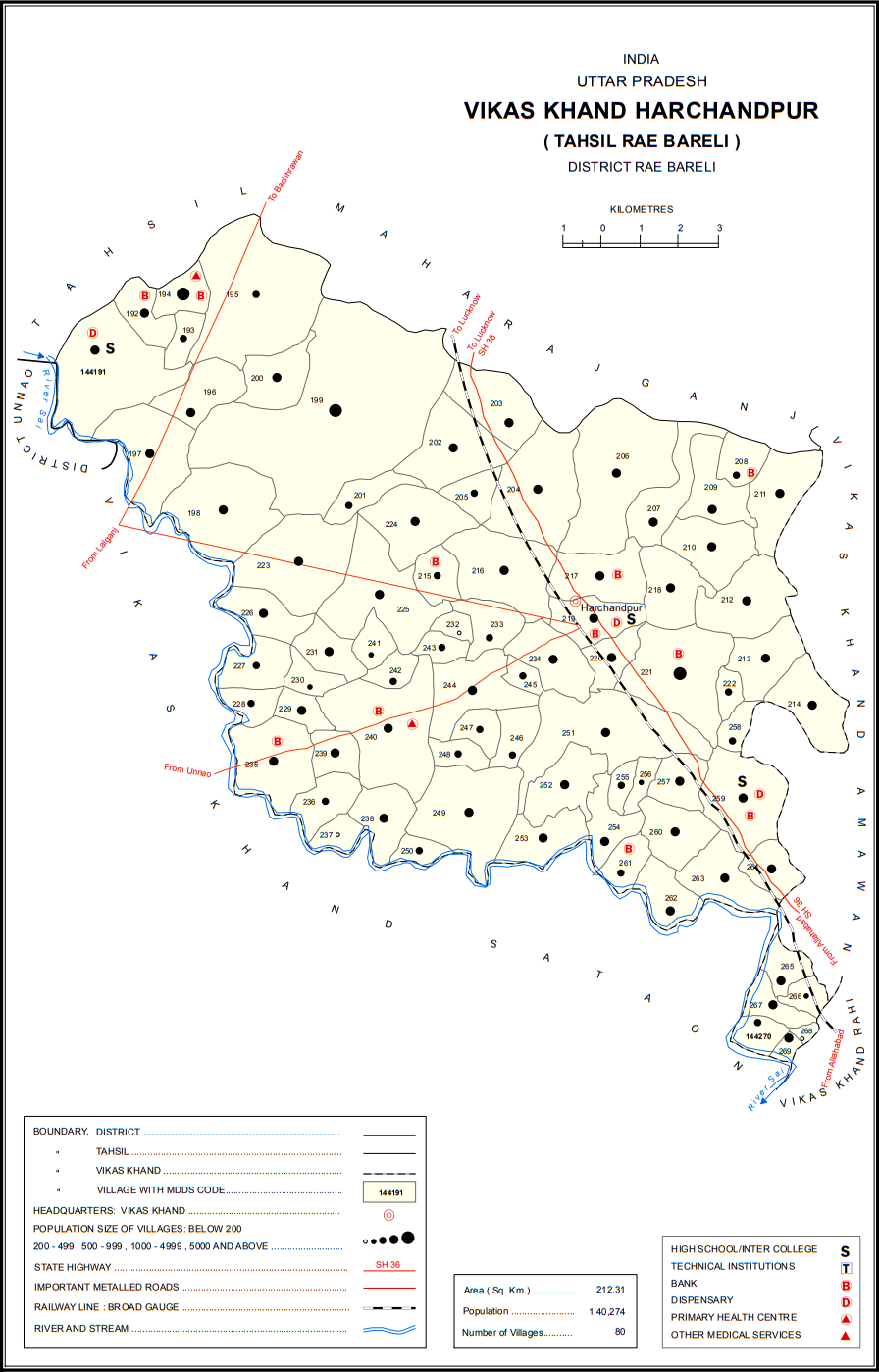
- Map showing Bargadha (#233) in Harchandpur CD block

- Location in Uttar Pradesh, India
- Coordinates: 26.33534°N 81.139197°E
- Country India: India
- State: Uttar Pradesh
- District: Raebareli

Area
  - Total: 1.535 km^{2} (0.593 sq mi)

Population (2011)
  - Total: 847
  - Density: 552/km^{2} (1,430/sq mi)

Languages
  - Official: Hindi
- Time zone: UTC+5:30 (IST)
- Vehicle registration: UP-35

Bargadha is a village in Harchandpur block of Rae Bareli district, Uttar Pradesh, India. As of 2011, its population is 847, in 141 households. It has one primary school and no healthcare facilities.

The 1961 census recorded Bargadha as comprising 3 hamlets, with a total population of 347 people (180 male and 167 female), in 75 households and 67 physical houses. The area of the village was given as 373 acres.

The 1981 census recorded Bargadha as having a population of 573 people, in 105 households, and having an area of 153.38 hectares. The main staple foods were given as wheat and rice.
