= Johwa Hisar =

Johwa Hisar Johwa Hisār
- Village
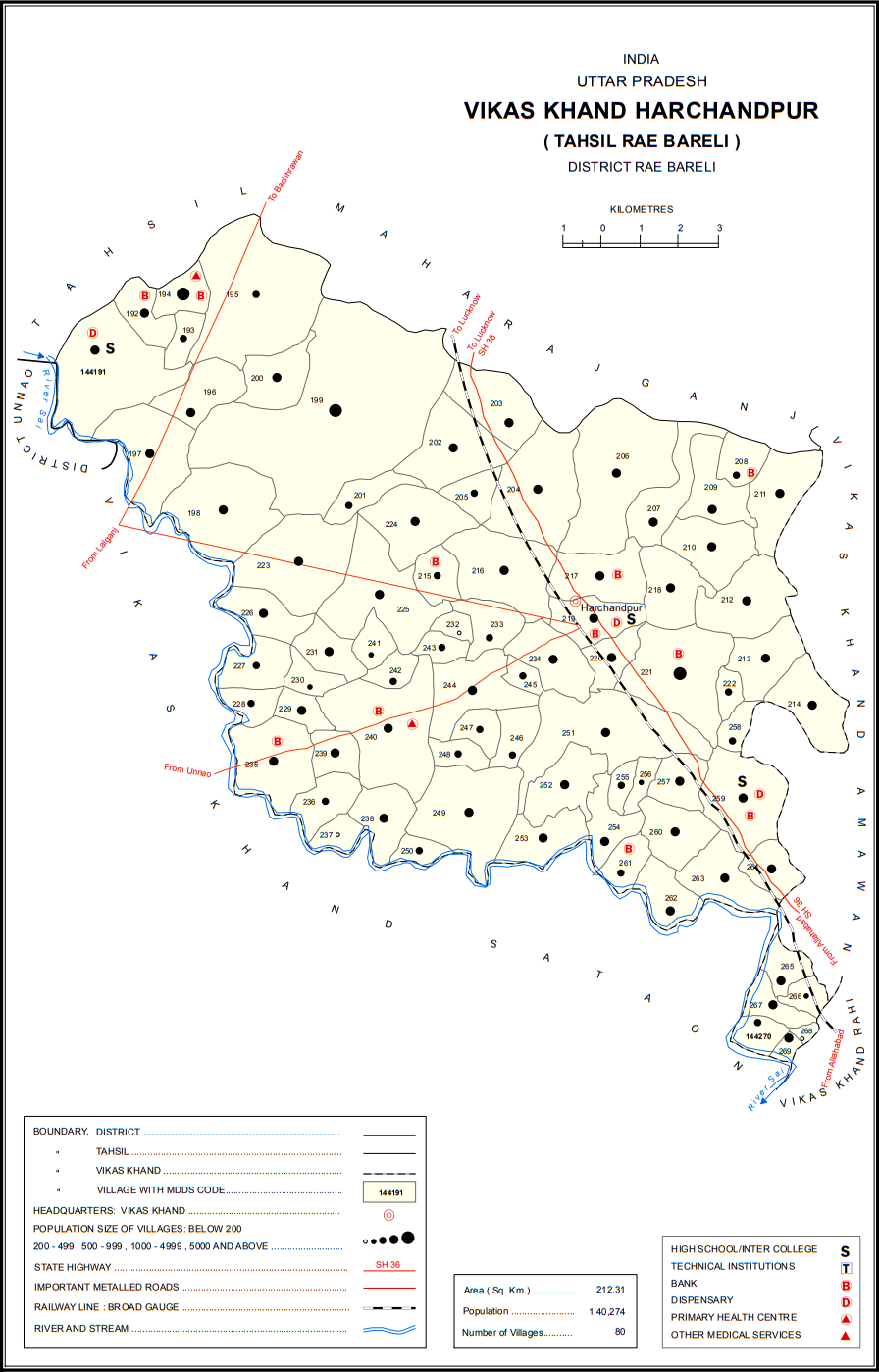
- Map showing Johwa Hisar (#200) in Harchandpur CD block

- Location in Uttar Pradesh, India
- Coordinates: 26.395323°N 81.092099°E
- Country India: India
- State: Uttar Pradesh
- District: Raebareli

Area
  - Total: 2.293 km^{2} (0.885 sq mi)

Population (2011)
  - Total: 1,692
  - Density: 737.9/km^{2} (1,911/sq mi)

Languages
  - Official: Hindi
- Time zone: UTC+5:30 (IST)
- Vehicle registration: UP-35

Johwa Hisar is a village in Harchandpur block of Rae Bareli district, Uttar Pradesh, India. It is located 38 km from Raebareli, the district headquarters. As of 2011, its population is 1,692, in 372 households. It has one primary school and no healthcare facilities.

The 1961 census recorded Johwa Hisar as comprising 2 hamlets, with a total population of 586 people (308 male and 278 female), in 134 households and 121 physical houses. The area of the village was given as 550 acres.

The 1981 census recorded Johwa Hisar as having a population of 890 people, in 178 households, and having an area of 229.46 hectares. The main staple foods were given as wheat and rice. It had no amenities other than drinking water.
