= Sarai Umar =

Sarai Umar Sarāi Umar
- Village
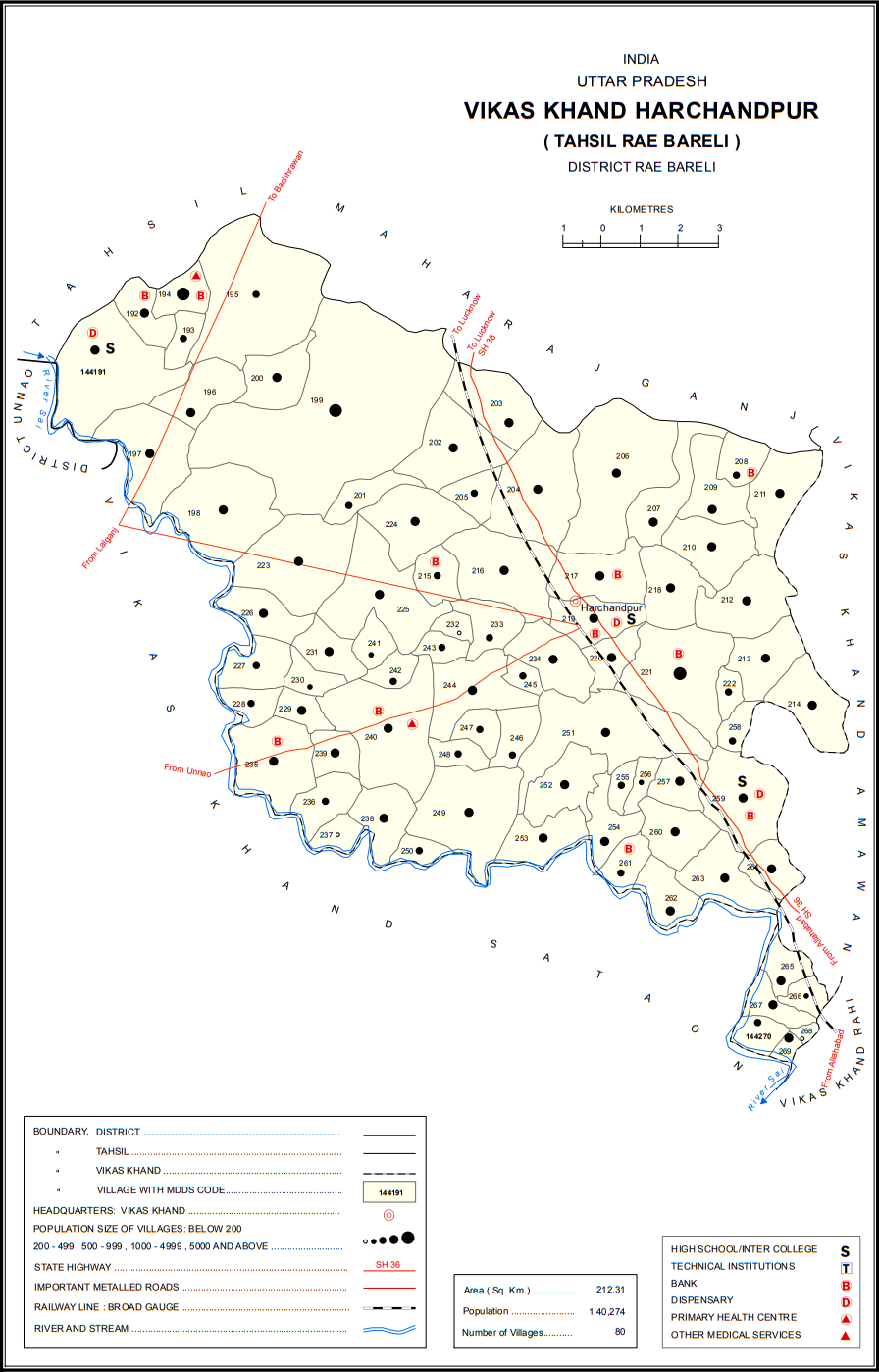
- Map showing Sarai Umar (#198) in Harchandpur CD block

- Location in Uttar Pradesh, India
- Coordinates: 26.362855°N 81.082593°E
- Country India: India
- State: Uttar Pradesh
- District: Raebareli

Area
  - Total: 4.64 km^{2} (1.79 sq mi)

Population (2011)
  - Total: 2,434
  - Density: 525/km^{2} (1,360/sq mi)

Languages
  - Official: Hindi
- Time zone: UTC+5:30 (IST)
- Vehicle registration: UP-35

Sarai Umar is a village in Harchandpur block of Rae Bareli district, Uttar Pradesh, India. As of 2011, its population is 2,434, in 490 households. It has two primary schools and no healthcare facilities.

The 1961 census recorded Sarai Umar as comprising 7 hamlets, with a total population of 912 people (482 male and 430 female), in 185 households and 183 physical houses. The area of the village was given as 1,179 acres.

The 1981 census recorded Sarai Umar as having a population of 1,440 people, in 285 households, and having an area of 472.69 hectares. The main staple foods were given as wheat and rice.
