= Mubarakpur, Harchandpur =

Mubarakpur Mubārakpur
- Village
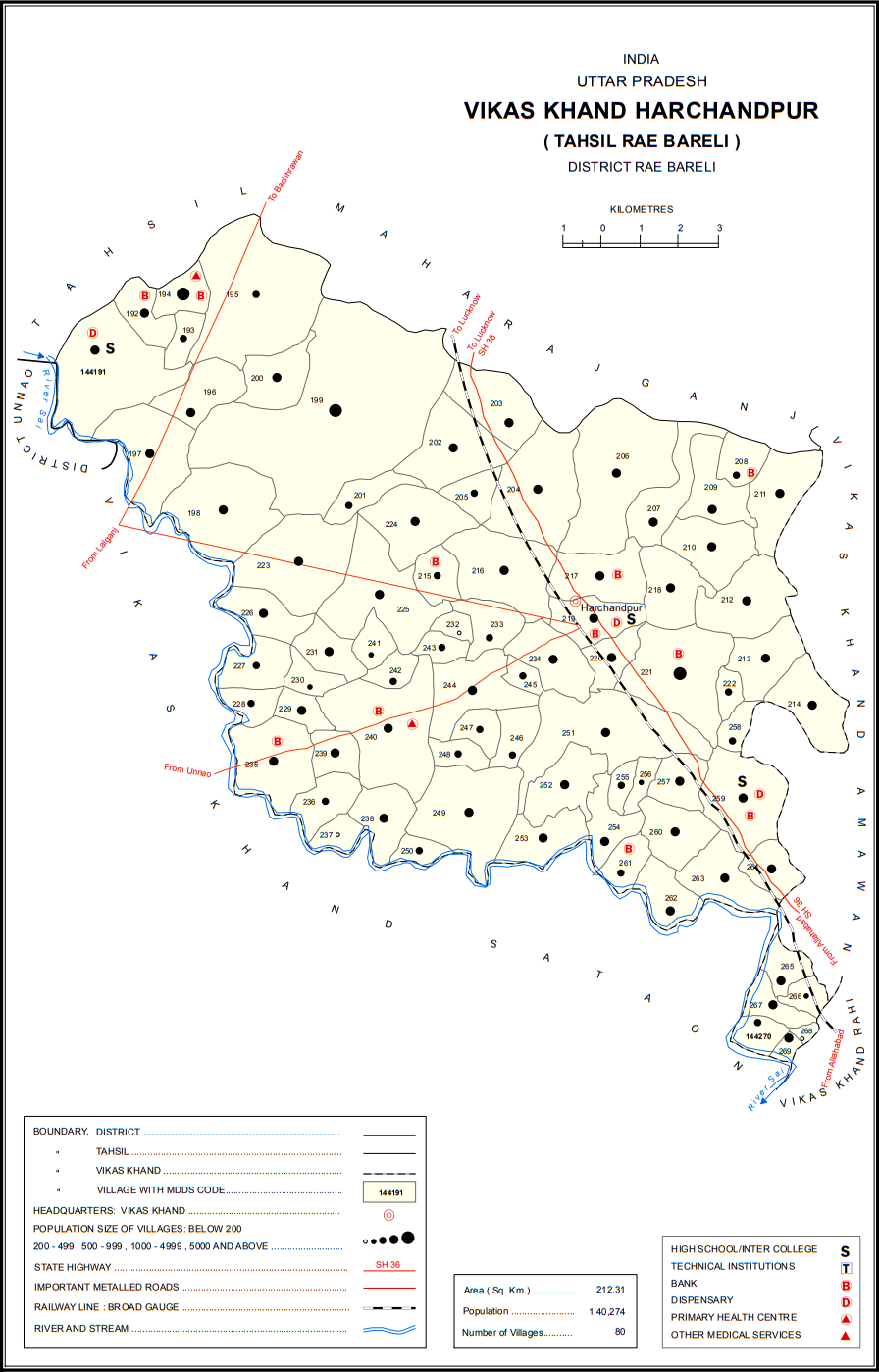
- Map showing Mubarakpur (#263) in Harchandpur CD block

- Location in Uttar Pradesh, India
- Coordinates: 26°16′43″N 81°12′03″E
- Country India: India
- State: Uttar Pradesh
- District: Raebareli

Area
  - Total: 2.466 km^{2} (0.952 sq mi)

Population (2011)
  - Total: 1,326
  - Density: 537.7/km^{2} (1,393/sq mi)

Languages
  - Official: Hindi
- Time zone: UTC+5:30 (IST)
- Vehicle registration: UP-35

Mubarakpur is a village in Harchandpur block of Rae Bareli district, Uttar Pradesh, India. It is located 5 km from Raebareli, the district headquarters. As of 2011, its population is 1,326, in 260 households. It has one primary school and no healthcare facilities.

The 1961 census recorded Mubarakpur as comprising 1 hamlet, with a total population of 573 people (304 male and 269 female), in 138 households and 129 physical houses. The area of the village was given as 605 acres.

The 1981 census recorded Mubarakpur as having a population of 841 people, in 166 households, and having an area of 248.89 hectares. The main staple foods were given as juwar and rice.
