= Seri, Raebareli =

Seri
- Village
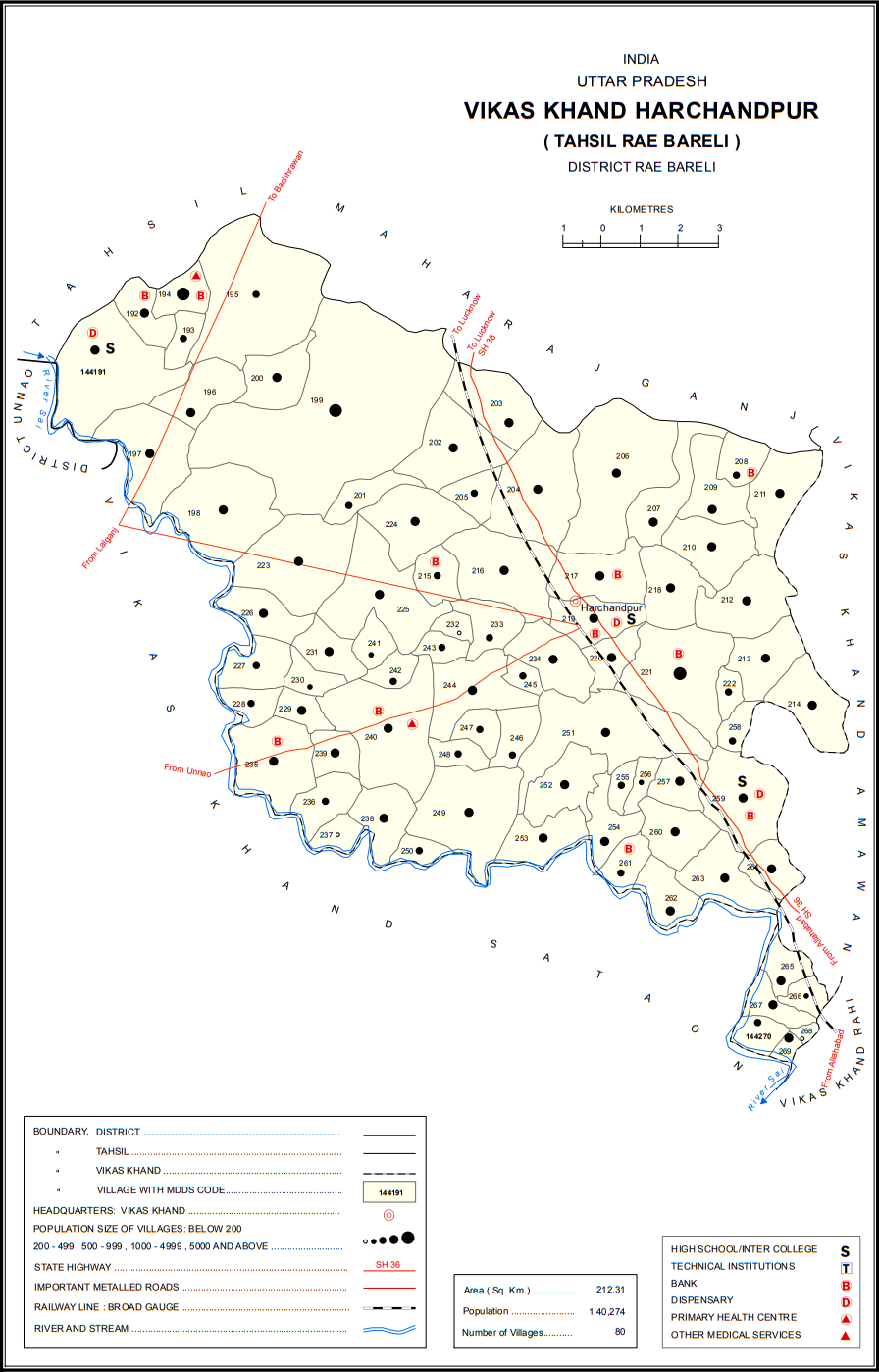
- Map showing Seri (#203) in Harchandpur CD block

- Location in Uttar Pradesh, India
- Coordinates: 26.382348°N 81.146297°E
- Country India: India
- State: Uttar Pradesh
- District: Raebareli

Area
  - Total: 2.837 km^{2} (1.095 sq mi)

Population (2011)
  - Total: 1,948
  - Density: 686.6/km^{2} (1,778/sq mi)

Languages
  - Official: Hindi
- Time zone: UTC+5:30 (IST)
- Vehicle registration: UP-35

Seri is a village in Harchandpur block of Rae Bareli district, Uttar Pradesh, India. As of 2011, its population is 1,948, in 382 households. It has 3 primary schools and no healthcare facilities.

The 1961 census recorded Seri as comprising 2 hamlets, with a total population of 972 people (484 male and 488 female), in 181 households and 179 physical houses. The area of the village was given as 725 acres and it had a post office at that point.

The 1981 census recorded Seri (as "Sheri") as having a population of 1,165 people, in 230 households, and having an area of 279.65 hectares. The main staple foods were given as wheat and rice.
