= Faridpur, Harchandpur =

Faridpur
- Village
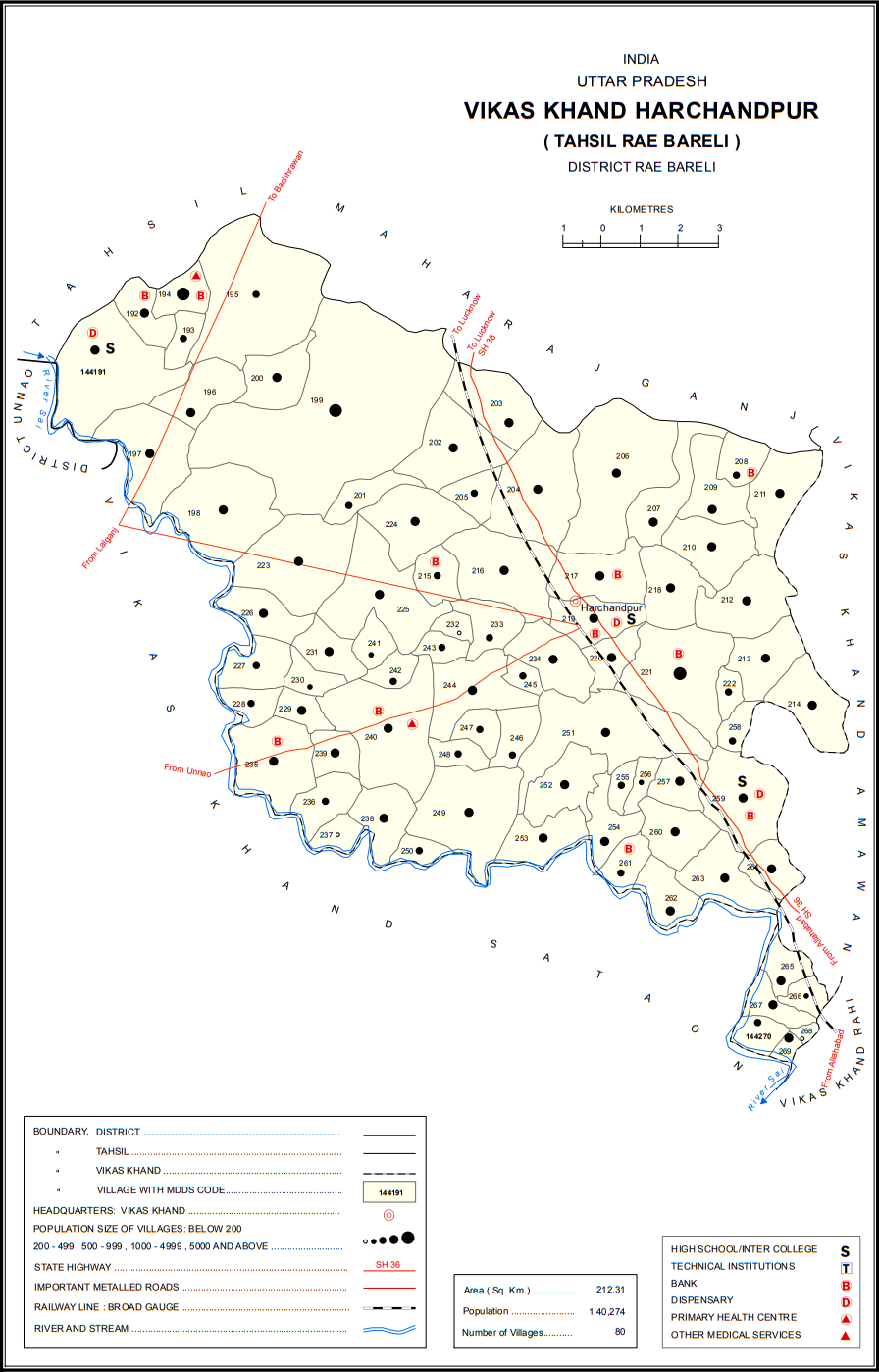
- Map showing Faridpur (#247) in Harchandpur CD block

- Location in Uttar Pradesh, India
- Coordinates: 26.311837°N 81.134628°E
- Country India: India
- State: Uttar Pradesh
- District: Raebareli

Area
  - Total: 1.025 km^{2} (0.396 sq mi)

Population (2011)
  - Total: 993
  - Density: 969/km^{2} (2,510/sq mi)

Languages
  - Official: Hindi
- Time zone: UTC+5:30 (IST)
- Vehicle registration: UP-35

Faridpur is a village in Harchandpur block of Rae Bareli district, Uttar Pradesh, India. It is located 22 km from Raebareli, the district headquarters. As of 2011, its population is 993, in 151 households. It has one primary school and no healthcare facilities.

The 1961 census recorded Faridpur as comprising 2 hamlets, with a total population of 397 people (214 male and 183 female), in 67 households and 61 physical houses. The area of the village was given as 265 acres.

The 1981 census recorded Faridpur as having a population of 592 people, in 81 households, and having an area of 103.20 hectares. The main staple foods were given as wheat and rice.
