= Kankhara =

- Village
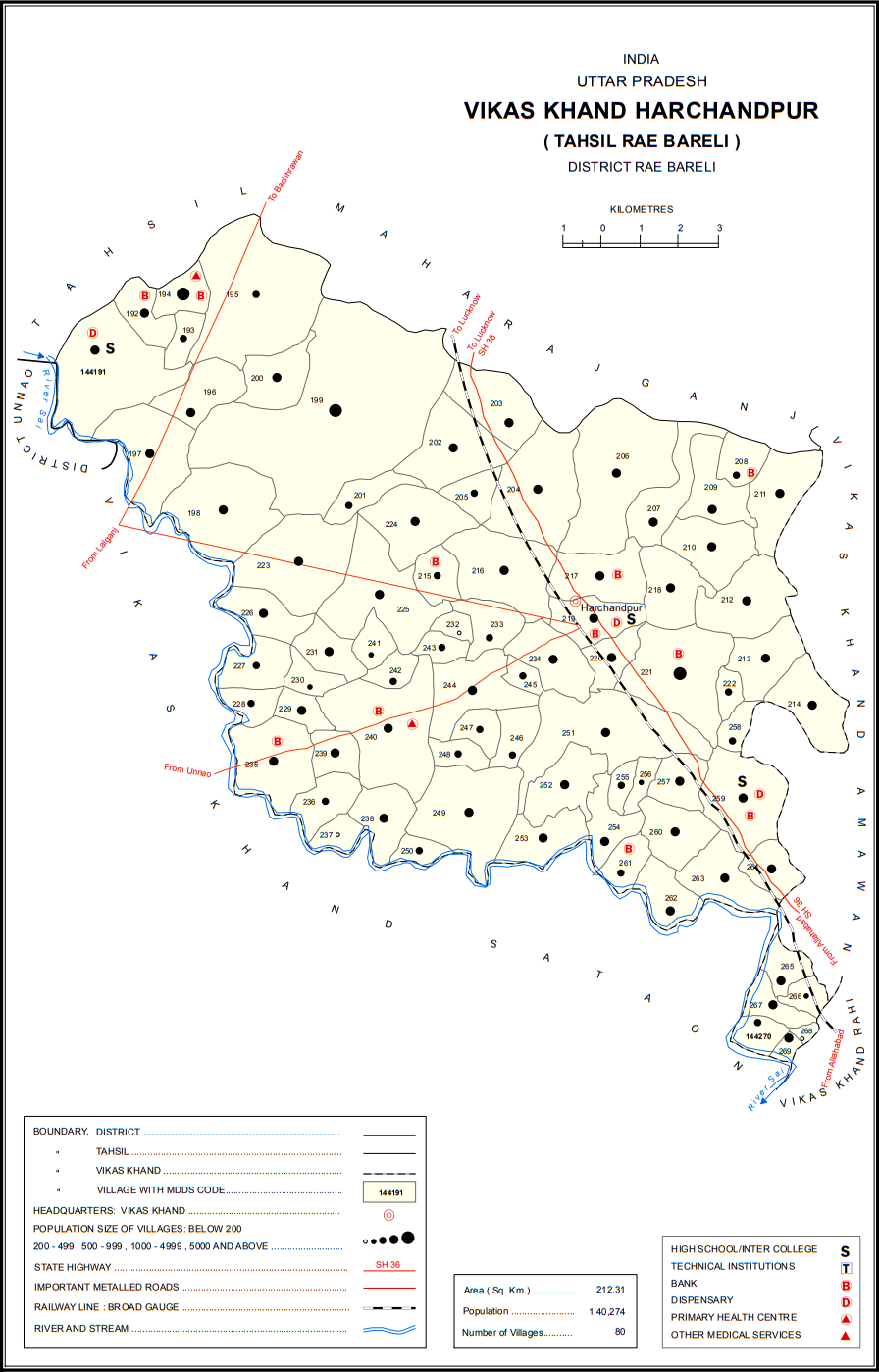
- Map showing Kankhara (#246) in Harchandpur CD block

- Location in Uttar Pradesh, India
- Coordinates: 26.308934°N 81.147136°E
- Country India: India
- State: Uttar Pradesh
- District: Raebareli

Area
  - Total: 1.48 km^{2} (0.57 sq mi)

Population (2011)
  - Total: 808
  - Density: 546/km^{2} (1,410/sq mi)

Languages
  - Official: Hindi
- Time zone: UTC+5:30 (IST)
- Vehicle registration: UP-35

Kankhara is a village in Harchandpur block of Rae Bareli district, Uttar Pradesh, India. As of 2011, its population is 808, in 146 households. It has one primary school and no healthcare facilities.

The 1961 census recorded Kankhara as comprising 3 hamlets, with a total population of 213 people (123 male and 90 female), in 39 households and 38 physical houses. The area of the village was given as 367 acres.

The 1981 census recorded Kankhara as having a population of 428 people, in 85 households, and having an area of 149.74 hectares. The main staple foods were given as wheat and juwar.
