= Paltu Tanda =

Paltu Tanda Paltu Tānda
- Village
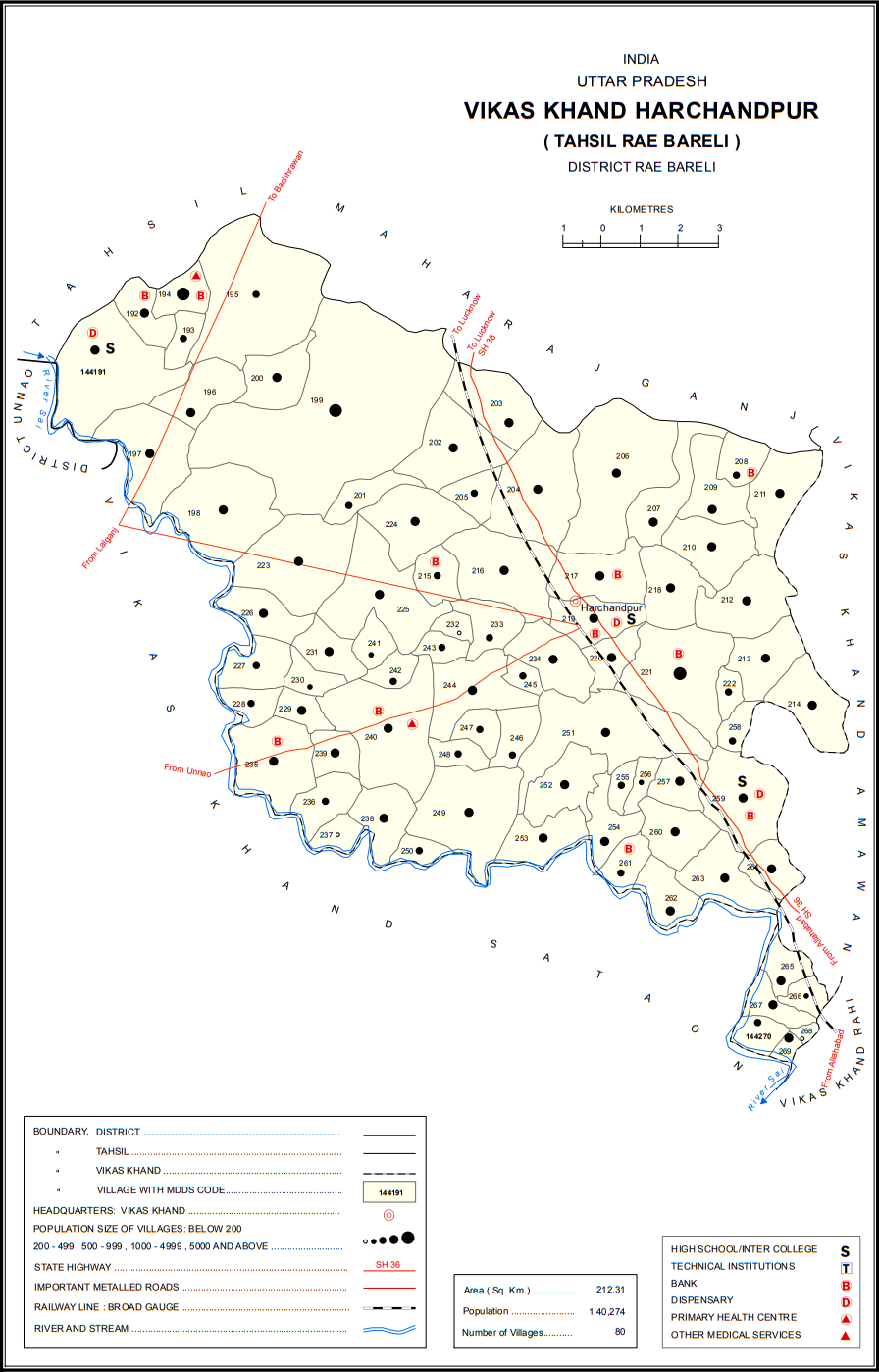
- Map showing Paltu Tanda (#266) in Harchandpur CD block

- Location in Uttar Pradesh, India
- Coordinates: 26.244857°N 81.216338°E
- Country India: India
- State: Uttar Pradesh
- District: Raebareli

Area
  - Total: 0.81 km^{2} (0.31 sq mi)

Population (2011)
  - Total: 414
  - Density: 510/km^{2} (1,300/sq mi)

Languages
  - Official: Hindi
- Time zone: UTC+5:30 (IST)
- Vehicle registration: UP-35

Paltu Tanda is a village in Harchandpur block of Rae Bareli district, Uttar Pradesh, India. It is located 2 km from Raebareli, the district headquarters. As of 2011, its population is 414, in 80 households. It has no schools and no healthcare facilities.

The 1961 census recorded Paltu Tanda as comprising 1 hamlet, with a total population of 152 people (62 male and 90 female), in 34 households and 33 physical houses. The area of the village was given as 199 acres.

The 1981 census recorded Paltu Tanda as having a population of 195 people, in 41 households, and having an area of 80.54 hectares. The main staple foods were given as wheat and rice.
