= Daudpur, Raebareli =

Daudpur Dāūdpur
- Village
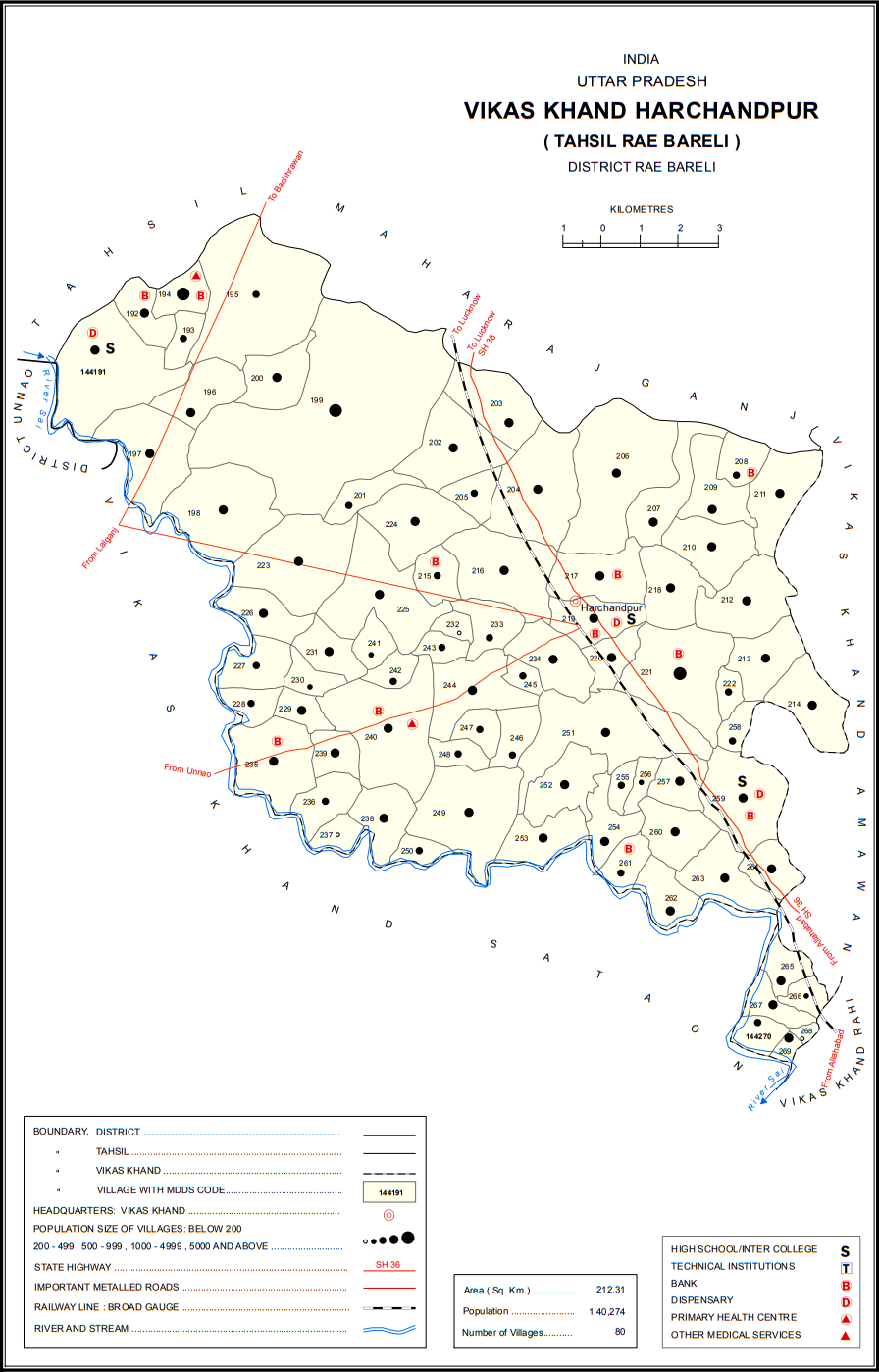
- Map showing Daudpur (#265) in Harchandpur CD block

- Location in Uttar Pradesh, India
- Coordinates: 26.253022°N 81.219296°E
- Country India: India
- State: Uttar Pradesh
- District: Raebareli

Area
  - Total: 1.41 km^{2} (0.54 sq mi)

Population (2011)
  - Total: 1,175
  - Density: 833/km^{2} (2,160/sq mi)

Languages
  - Official: Hindi
- Time zone: UTC+5:30 (IST)
- Vehicle registration: UP-35

Daudpur is a village in Harchandpur block of Rae Bareli district, Uttar Pradesh, India. It is located 5 km from Raebareli, the district headquarters. As of 2011, its population is 1,175, in 220 households.

The 1961 census recorded Daudpur as comprising 1 hamlet, with a total population of 450 people (229 male and 221 female), in 113 households and 95 physical houses. The area of the village was given as 343 acres and it had a medical practitioner at that point.

The 1981 census recorded Daudpur as having a population of 701 people, in 135 households, and having an area of 138.00 hectares. The main staple foods were given as wheat and rice.
