= Raebareli district =

- District of Uttar Pradesh
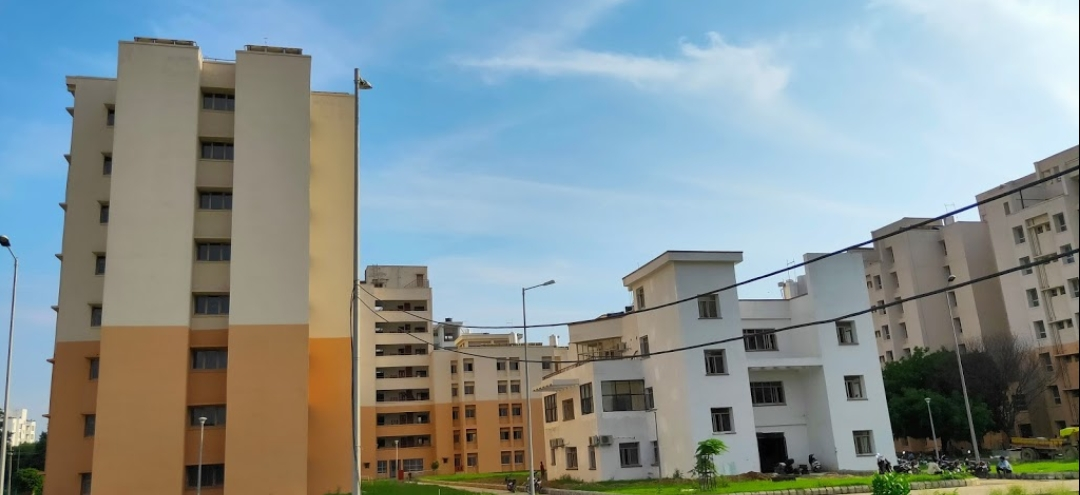
- AIIMS Raebareli Residential Complex

- Location of Raebareli district in Uttar Pradesh
- Coordinates (Raebareli): 26°13′48″N 81°14′24″E
- Country: India
- State: Uttar Pradesh
- Division: Lucknow
- Established: 1858
- Headquarters: Raebareli

Government
  - Lok Sabha constituencies: 1. Rae Bareli (Lok Sabha constituency) - Bachhrawan, Harchandpur, Rae Bareli, Sareni, Unchahar; 2. Amethi (Lok Sabha constituency) (Partial) - Salon
  - Vidhan Sabha constituencies: 1. Bachhrawan; 2. Harchandpur; 3. Rae Bareli; 4. Salon; 5. Sareni; 6. Unchahar

Area
  - Total: 3,371 km^{2} (1,302 sq mi)

Population (2011)
  - Total: 2,903,507
  - Density: 861.3/km^{2} (2,231/sq mi)

Demographics
  - Literacy: 67.25%
  - Sex ratio: 943
- Time zone: UTC+05:30 (IST)
- Major highways: NH30, NH31, NH330A, NH128, NH335
- Website: raebareli.nic.in

Raebareli district is a district of Uttar Pradesh state in northern India. The city of Raebareli is the district headquarters. This district is a part of Lucknow Division in Uttar Pradesh state. The total area of Raebareli district is 3,371 Sq. km. The district headquarters is Raebareli.

As of 2011, its population is 3,405,559, which makes it the 27th largest in the state. It is a predominantly rural district, with 91% of the population living in rural areas.

== Geography ==
Raebareli district is located in the southern part of Awadh, at the southern end of Lucknow Division. It is compact in shape — no part of the district is especially far from the city of Raebareli. In general, the terrain is flat or gently undulating, and the soil is especially fertile and well-suited to agriculture. The elevation ranges from 100 to 120 m above sea level. The prevailing slope is from higher in the northwest to lower in the southeast, and the rivers that traverse the district all flow in this direction.

The main river of Raebareli district is the Ganges, which forms the southern border of the district; the other rivers in the district are all its tributaries. The Ganges enters the district at Malipur, close to the Baksar ghat, and then flows southeast until reaching Bairua, where it bends more to the north. After Ralpur it turns east-northeast until it reaches Dalmau, where it returns to a southeastern course. It flows mostly straight in this direction until reaching Gukana, where it turns sharply to the south before resuming its original direction at the Naubasta ghat, and then it maintains this course until leaving the district at Katra Bahadurganj. The bed of the Ganges is sandy and has a width of about two miles. It is navigable throughout the district for boats carrying up to 40 tons, although now its importance as a means of transportation has declined in favour of road and rail.

The other main river in the district is the Sai, which is a tributary of the Ganges. It flows right down the middle of the district, from Rampur Sudauli in the northwestern corner to Kanhpur in the southeast, and has a meandering course. The Sai is not navigable — its depth during the hot season is no more than two feet — and it is not well suited for irrigation because it has high banks, leaving the actual level of the water well below the ground level of the surrounding terrain.

Most of the smaller rivers in Raebareli district are tributaries of the Sai. The Basaha, a right-bank tributary of the Sai, has its source in wetlands near Khiron and then flows in a well-defined bed before joining the Sai near Purai, west of the district headquarters. During the hot months it dries up completely, but during the rainy season it becomes fairly large. In years with high rainfall, the high volume of water in the Basaha can cause flooding further downstream after joining the Sai. The Soh is another small right-bank tributary of the Sai; it begins in Unnao district and flows a bit to the north of the Unnao-Raebareli road before joining the Sai near the village of Bardar. The Chob, one of two streams with that name in the district, flows north from the watershed at Itaura Buzurg to its confluence with the Sai at Bara Dih, near Salon. This river historically formed the boundary between the Baiswara region and the lands of the Kanhpuria Rajputs.

There are also four small streams that go by the generic name Naiya; these are seasonal drainage channels that dry up during the cold months. The Kathwara Naiya begins northeast of Johwa Sharqi and flows southeast, then south, and then after reaching the namesake village of Kathwara it turns southwest. It joins the Sai near the village of Andohar. The Maharajganj Naiya rises in the jhils near Kumhrawan in the north of the district; it takes a meandering course towards the south before joining the Sai at the village of Makraha near Parshadepur. The Nasirabad Naiya flows south past Nasirabad, its namesake, then turns east for a short distance before turning back to the south. It joins the Sai near Ateha in Pratapgarh district. The last stream called the Naiya is the Simrauta Naiya, which originates in Barabanki district and is a tributary of the Gomti rather than the Sai.

There are also a couple of tributaries of the Ganges in Raebareli district. One is the other Chob, which begins on the south side of the Itaura Buzurg watershed and flows south before joining the Ganges at Shahzadpur, just upstream from the Gukana ghat. The Loni, further west, can be fairly large but usually dries up during the hot season. It begins in Unnao district and then follows a winding course through Raebareli district before joining the Ganges just west of Dalmau.

These rivers and streams demarcate the main natural areas of the district. There are four main areas: the Ganges floodplains, in the south along the Ganges; the Dalmau plain, which is the upland area between the limits of the Ganges floodwaters and the Sai catchment; the Sai Catchment, extending for about 25 km on either side of the Sai; and the Bachhrawan-Jais plain in the north.

=== Ganges floodplain ===
In the south are the low-lying khadar lands below the old high bank of the Ganges. This area is locally called kachar. In some places, the Ganges bank is a cliff and the kachar is nonexistent; in other areas it can be up to 2 miles wide. Kachar lands closest to the river are inundated each year during the wet season, so that cultivation is only possible during the rabi season. Kachar lands further inland are generally protected from annual floods; they are well-suited for agriculture and often do well without irrigation. Villages in this area are especially large and usually are built on the high bank of the Ganges to protect from flood waters.

=== Dalmau plain ===
Above the high bank of the Ganges, the landscape is eroded by tributary channels so that it consists of various mostly-flat plateaus separated by nalas. The soil in the Ganges uplands is typically a light loam with a fair amount of sand mixed in; the plateaus have more fertile soil than the ravines along the nalas. Wheat is the main cereal crop grown in this area; there are only a few localities where the water collects in hollows and rice is the staple crop. Historically, this tract was well-shaded by mango and mahua groves.

A bit further north, there is a belt of slightly lower-lying land with stiffer clay soil interspersed with broad shallow wetlands and patches of barren usar land. This area stretches from Khiron towards Lalganj and Thalrai, and then on to Bela Bhela and Rohanian. Rice is the main crop grown here — in many areas, the soil is too stiff to support rabi crops, and in still other areas, it only supports a light crop of gram and linseed after the rice harvest.

A mostly continuous chain of jhils runs through this clayey region for the entire length of the district. They are parallel to the courses of the Ganges and the Sai, and they may represent an old river bed. This group of jhils is distinctly deep and narrow compared to elsewhere in the district, and many of them are oxbow or irregular in shape. The soil here is much less stiff than the surrounding clay, and instead it ranges from sand to light loam. The chain of jhils forms three distinct systems: in the west, near Khiron, they form the source of the Basaha; closer to Dalmau, they form a series of small channels that eventually join the Sai; finally, in the east near Salon, they form one of the Naiyas which eventually goes into Pratapgarh district. The jhils all dry up mostly or entirely during the hot season.

=== Sai catchment ===
The Sai uplands generally resemble the Ganges uplands, although here the least fertile soils are more extreme than in the Ganges uplands. The good soils along the Sai, though, are among the best in the district for agriculture. On the south side of the river, west of Raebareli, many nalas cut up the terrain. The Sai basin narrows further east, around Pandri Ganeshpur.

=== Bachhrawan-Jais plain ===
The northern part of the district generally has firm loamy or clayey soil, with rice as the staple crop. This area is studded with various jhils, of which the largest are the Mung Tal, Hanswa, Khaur, and Salothu. Like the jhils on the Dalmau plain, these northern jhils largely dry up during the hot season. Settlements in this region are more sparsely distributed than elsewhere in the district.

=== Forests ===
Woodlands once covered a large area in Raebareli district, but this has mostly been cleared to make room for agriculture. In the 1800s, William Henry Sleeman described a large jungle stretching out for 12 miles on either side of the Sai, which historically formed a stronghold of the Nain Kanhpurias; after their participation in the Indian Rebellion of 1857, the British cut down parts of it to break it up. Patches of dhak jungle remain throughout the areas with stiff soils, as well as along the Sai, but their total area is negligible.

The common trees of Raebareli district are the same as the rest of southern Awadh. The most common growing wild are neem, babul, bargad, pipal, tamarisk, and jamun. Mango and mahua trees are also widely grown in orchards throughout the district. The shisham is uncommon in Raebareli district, and past attempts to introduce the sal were unsuccessful.

=== Wildlife ===
Due to extensive deforestation in modern times, the number and variety of wild animals present in Raebareli district has fallen significantly. In the early 19th century there were wild tigers, hyenas, and buffaloes in the high tamarisk woodlands along the Ganges, but these had disappeared by 1900. The Indian wolf was also once common, but by the 20th century it had become rare. Antelopes, also once common, have similarly declined and are now represented by a few nilgai along the Ganges as well as some blackbucks along the Ganges and around Bachhrawan. Wild cattle also exist in small numbers along the Sai and Ganges, and jackals are also sometimes seen. Other mammals include foxes, cats, and mongooses.

The birds present in the district are similar to surrounding districts. There are plenty of waterfowl and snipe during the cold months, and quail are also fairly common. There are also some black partridges and sandgrouses on the Ganges floodplain. The red-headed parrot was also formerly caught for its feathers.

== History ==
Raebareli district did not exist as a distinct administrative division until 1858. After the British annexation of Oudh State in 1856, there was originally a Salon district, with its headquarters at Salon, and which stretched from Purwa to Allahabad, but in 1858 this was scrapped and Raebareli district was created. However, Raebareli district has since undergone major territorial changes. As originally drawn up, Raebareli district was composed of four tehsils: Raebareli, Haidergarh, Bihar, and Dalmau. Raebareli and Dalmau tehsils, which were soon merged, each contained a single pargana of the same name. Haidergarh tehsil contained four parganas: Haidergarh, Kumhrawan, Bachhrawan, and Hardoi. Meanwhile, Bihar tehsil covered the region known as Baiswara and had nine parganas: Bihar, Khiron, Sareni, Bhagwantnagar, Daundia Khera, Patan, Panhan, Magrayar, and Ghatampur.

The resulting district boundaries were very irregular and in 1869 there was a significant administrative overhaul. All of Bihar tehsil except for Khiron and Sareni were transferred into Unnao district, and the Haidergarh pargana was moved into Barabanki district. Meanwhile, the parganas of Inhauna, Mohanganj, Rokha Jais, and Simrauta were moved into Raebareli district from Sultanpur district, while the parganas of Salon and Parshadepur were taken from Pratapgarh district.

As a result of these changes, the tehsil arrangement of Raebareli district was altered. A new Dalmau tehsil was formed containing the parganas of Dalmau, Khiron, and Sareni, leaving Raebareli tehsil containing the single pargana of Raebareli. Salon remained a tehsil headquarters, as it had been under Pratapgarh district, comprising the parganas of Salon, Parshadepur, and Rokha Jais (replacing Ateha, which was left in Pratapgarh district). In the north of the district, the remnants of the Haidergarh and Mohanganj tehsils were united under the new Maharajganj tehsil, which comprised the parganas of Mohanganj, Simrauta, Inhauna, Kumhrawan, Bachhrawan, and Hardoi.

When Raebareli district was first formed, it was made the seat of Raebareli division, along with Sultanpur and Pratapgarh districts, but in 1891 this division was merged with Lucknow division.

=== Early history ===
The history of what is now Raebareli district is mostly unknown until the time of the medieval Delhi Sultanate. The only sources for this period are local traditions. One thing that most traditions agree on is that this region was originally ruled by the Bhars, and most old ruins in the district are generally attributed to them. The Bhars appear to have been in power in this area longer than anywhere else in Awadh, and they were not finally subjugated until the reign of Ibrahim Shah of the Jaunpur Sultanate (early 15th century). According to legend, the cities of Raebareli and Dalmau take their names from two Bhar rulers named Dal and Bal, but if they ever existed, it is impossible to assign any dates to them. In any case, tradition holds that the Bhars were later driven out by the Rajputs and, to a lesser extent, the Muslims.

The Rajputs that came to rule over the area of today's Raebareli district mostly belonged to three main clains: the Bais in the south and west, the Kanhpurias in the east, and the Amethias in the north. Of these, the Bais were the first; their family traditions state that they came to this region around 1250 under one Abhai Chand, who was rewarded by the Gautam Raja of Argal (in what is now Fatehpur district) with a grant of lands that the raja had only nominal control over. His descendants came to rule over the region known as Baiswara. The Kanhpurias also became powerful in this region at an early date; their original base was at Kanhpur between Salon and Pratapgarh. As for the Amethias, they were always the weakest of the three clans in this region; they got their name from the town of Amethi in today's Lucknow district.

=== Early Muslim dynasties ===
The early history of the Muslims in this region are not clear. According to legend, Dalmau was conquered by Salar Sahu, father of Sayyid Salar Masud, in 423 AH, and he then appointed one Malik Abdullah as governor. However, it is more likely that Dalmau only came under Muslim control during the reign of Muhammad bin Tughlaq of the Delhi Sultanate, when one Malik Mubarak was made governor, and that before this Dalmau had been under Hindu rule. Some early Muslim immigrants also came from Manikpur, such as the Gardezi Sayyids of Mustafabad and the Pathans of Amanwan and Pahremau.

The Jaunpur Sultanate was the first major Muslim polity to make significant inroads in the area of today's district. In 1376, one Mardan Daulat Nasir-ul-Mulk was given the territories of Kara and Mahoba, along with the iqta of Dalmau. This man was given the title "Malik-ush-Sharq" by Firoz Shah Tughlaq and later became known as Khizr Khan. It is not known how long Khizr Khan retained control of Dalmau, but in 1394 it was given to Khwaja-i-Jahan, founder of the Jaunpur Sultanate, along with the rest of Awadh.

The most prominent of the Jaunpur Sultans in the history of Raebareli district was Ibrahim Shah, who rose to power in 1401. He posted a governor at Dalmau and went to war against the Bhars and Rajputs, and he went on to establish most of the Muslim outposts in the area. It was during this time that Raebareli was probably built up into a major town for the first time, with a qazi posted there. After Ibrahim Shah's death, however, the Bais and Kanhpuria Rajputs reasserted their independence and were not subdued until the reign of the final Jaunpur Sultan, Husain Shah, who was Ibrahim's grandson.

After Husain Shah's defeat by Bahlol Lodi, the region came under the nominal authority of the Delhi Sultanate. The Rajputs again took advantage of the temporary instability to strengthen their own position. In 1492, the Bachgotis in what is now Pratapgarh district rebelled, and Sikandar Lodi went on a campaign against them. He reached Dalmau in 1493, and fought a battle at Katghar nearby where he routed the Bachgotis. Another rebellion later broke out in Jaunpur, and Sikandar passed through the area on his way to deal with it. He stopped at Dalmau on the way and married the widow of Sher Khan Lohani while he was there.

=== Ain-i-Akbari ===
At the time of the Ain-i-Akbari in the late 1500s, the area of today's Raebareli district was divided between three different sarkars in two subahs: most belonged to Manikpur sarkar in Allahabad Subah, while portions in the north and west were included in Awadh and Lucknow sarkars in Awadh Subah.

12 mahals (i.e. parganas) of Manikpur sarkar were located partly or totally in the area of Raebareli district. In the north was Bhilwal, aka Bhalol, which was named after a village in what is now Barabanki district; it was later transferred to Nagram in today's Lucknow district, and Nagram remained the pargana headquarters until the foundation of Haidergarh at the end of the 18th century. The small pargana of Thulendi bordered Bhilwal to the south; its namesake was an old Muslim qasba, and the headquarters were moved to Bachhrawan during the time of Shuja-ud-Daula. To the south of Thulendi was the large pargana of Raebareli. South of Raebareli was Dalmau, whose borders then probably corresponded fairly closely with its 20th-century borders, although some of the western part probably belonged to the Baiswara mahals of Lucknow sarkar. Bordering Dalmau was the pargana of Salon, which provided the Mughal army with an "unusually large force" consisting of 8,900 infantry and 180 cavalry. North of Salon, and bordering Raebareli, was the pargana of Nasirabad, which included the later parganas of Parshadepur and Rokha (before it was merged with Jais). The pargana of Jais, at that time, also covered the later parganas of Mohanganj, Gaura Jamun (now in Sultanpur district), and part of Simrauta. The Kanhpurias were probably already the predominant group in the pargana; the later dismantling of Jais pargana took place towards the end of the 18th century, at the same time that the Kanhpuria estates were divided.

Two other mahals from Manikpur sarkar covered parts of Raebareli district: Qariat Guzara and Qariat Paegah. These were each very scattered entities consisting of various villages throughout the Salon tehsil as well as Pratapgarh district (Qariat Guzara had 262 villages and Qariat Paegah had 256). The purpose of Qariat Guzara is unclear; the word guzara means "maintenance", and it has been suggested that this mahal consisted of either villages assigned to the ruler's own (private) servants or villages whose revenues went towards the cost of entertaining royal messengers or other public servants passing through Manikpur. As for Qariat Paegah, the word paegah refers to a stable, indicating that its villages' revenues were set aside to defray the expenses incurred through the purchase and maintenance of the royal cattle. The two mahals each had their own courts as well as their own qanungos, whose descendants are still known as Guzaras and Paegahwalas respectively.

In the sarkar of Awadh, there were two mahals that covered parts of Raibareli district; these were Inhauna and Subeha. In the Ain-i-Akbari, Inhauna is said to have been held by Chauhans who had recently converted to Islam, which is possibly a reference to the Bhale Sultans, although they were mostly based further east. Alternatively, this could be a confused reference to the Bais of Inhauna, who are known to have converted to Islam in large numbers at an early date. As for Subeha, it was a very large mahal at that point; besides the later pargana of that name in today's Barabanki district, it also included the northern part of the later pargana of Simrauta, and possibly the northwestern part of Inhauna as well, although its exact boundaries at the time are uncertain.

At the time of the Ain-i-Akbari, the western part of today's Raebareli district was part of Lucknow sarkar, but the correspondence here is harder to trace. The modern parganas of Khiron and Sareni, in Baiswara, were then divided into several mahals that later ceased to exist. The ones in Sareni include Nisgar (or "Lashkar"), named after a village on the banks of the Ganges southwest of Sareni; Tara Singhaur, named after the present village of Singhaur Tara some distance downstream from Nisgar, in the far southeast of the pargana; Kahanjara, whose name is still preserved in the village of Kahanjar in the north of the pargana; and finally Deorakh, which refers to the present-day hamlet of Deorahar in the village of Raipur, and which covered the south-central part of the pargana. As for Khiron, it was mostly if not entirely covered by the mahal of Satanpur, although the northwestern corner may have belonged to Maurawan in Unnao district, or one of the other small mahals of Baiswara. Maurawan must have also included the later pargana of Raebareli. The mahal called "Haihar" in the Ain-i-Akbari probably corresponds to the modern village of Aihar, near Lalganj; this was a small mahal that belonged to the Bais. Finally, the mahal of Hardoi seems to be identical with the later pargana of the same name (not to be confused with the Hardoi in Hardoi district), but this is located some distance away from the rest of Lucknow sarkar and would have been entirely surrounded by Manikpur. It's not clear why this territory was included in Lucknow rather than Manikpur.

=== Later Mughals and Nawabs of Awadh ===
After Akbar died, the Rajput clans in the region once again enjoyed a period of relative independence. From this period until the foundation of Oudh State in the 18th century, the history of this area is basically synonymous with the history of its Rajput dynasties. It was during this period that the Saibasi branch of the Bais established their large domain.

When Saadat Ali Khan I was made governor of Awadh, he travelled through the region to secure the submission of the Rajput leaders. In order to earn their loyalty, he acknowledged the Rajput chiefs' rulership and entrusted them with collection of revenues within their own territories. This policy was generally successful.

Asaf-ud-Daula succeeded to the throne in 1774 and granted his mother the parganas of Salon, Jais, and Nasirabad in jagir. He also put Raebareli, Dalmau, Khiron, and Thulendi under the control of the chakladar of Baiswara at about the same time. From then until the British annexation of Awadh, the area of today's Raebareli district was then divided between the chaklas of Salon and Baiswara.

== Divisions ==
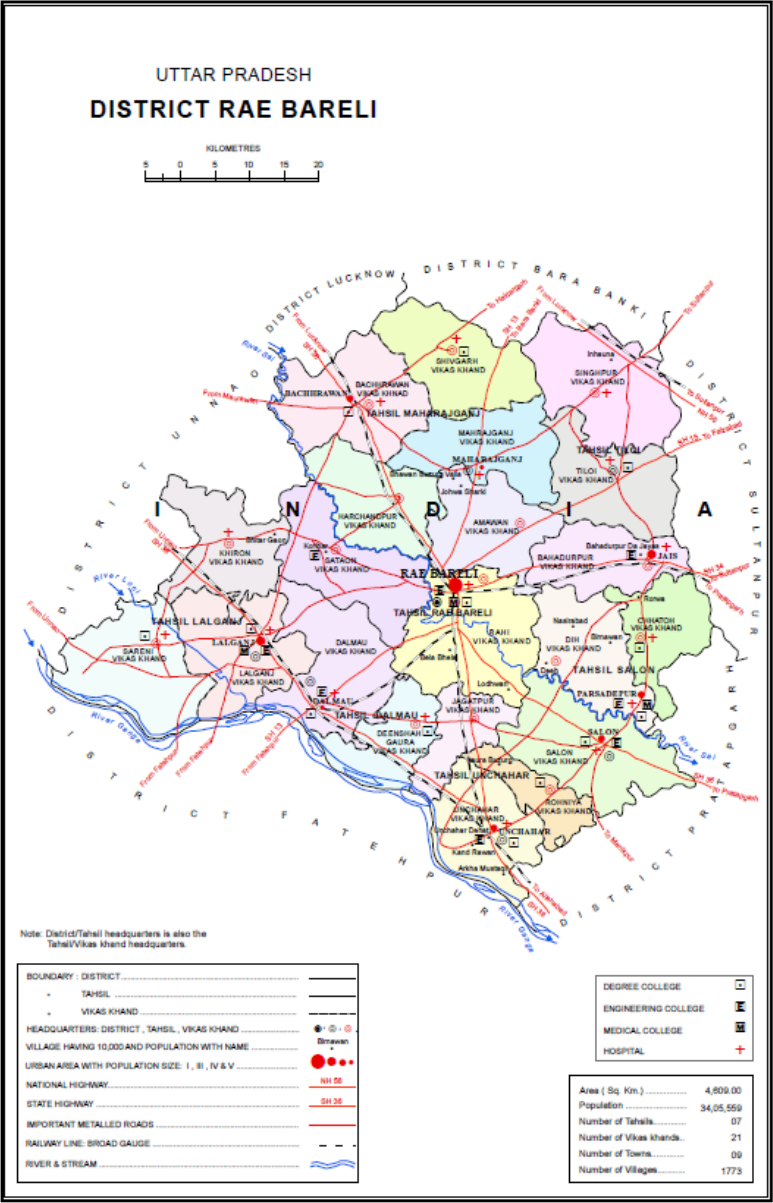
Subdivisions of Raebareli district

Raebareli district is divided into 7 tehsils and 21 community development blocks, as follows:

- Maharajganj tehsil
  - Bachhrawan block
  - Shivgarh block
  - Maharajganj block
- Tiloi tehsil
  - Singhpur block
  - Tiloi block
  - Bahadurpur block
- Rai Bareli tehsil
  - Harchandpur block
  - Amawan block
  - Sataon block
  - Rahi block
- Lalganj tehsil
  - Khiron block
  - Sareni block
  - Lalganj block
- Dalmau tehsil
  - Dalmau block
  - Deenshah Gaura block
- Unchahar tehsil
  - Jagatpur block
  - Unchahar block
  - Rohniya block
- Salon tehsil
  - Dih block
  - Chhatoh block
  - Salon block

== Municipalities ==
Rae Bareli district has 9 statutory towns, including 2 Nagar Palika Parishads (municipal boards) and 7 Nagar Panchayats. There are no non-statutory census towns in the district. The district's towns are as follows:

Town name	Classification	Tehsil	Population (in 2011)
Bachhrawan	Nagar Panchayat	Maharajganj	12,521
Maharajganj	Nagar Panchayat	Maharajganj	6,673
Jais	Nagar Palika Parishad	Tiloi	26,735
Rae Bareli	Nagar Palika Parishad	Rae Bareli	191,316
Lalganj	Nagar Panchayat	Lalganj	23,124
Dalmau	Nagar Panchayat	Dalmau	9,983
Unchahar	Nagar Panchayat	Unchahar	11,033
Parsadepur	Nagar Panchayat	Salon	11,853
Salon	Nagar Panchayat	Salon	14,757

== Villages ==
Raebareli district has 1,773 villages, of which 1,733 are inhabited and 40 are uninhabited. As of 2011, a majority of the populated villages (950 of them or 56%) have a population between 500 and 1,999 people. At the extreme ends of the spectrum, there are 67 villages (4% of the total) with a population below 200, and there are 16 (1%) with a population greater than 10,000.

In some places, a village's population is entirely clustered in the main site, or abadi, while in other cases a village consists of multiple hamlets, or purwas, dotting the landscape. There are over 8,000 such hamlets in Raebareli district, many of which are extremely small and consist of only two or three houses. These hamlets are typically founded by cultivators who want to live close to their fields in order to tend to them better.

== Economy ==
Raebareli district is predominantly agrarian and it produces large amounts of grain. The district is self-sufficient in grain production and also exports some to places like Europe, Japan, and North America.

In 2006 the Ministry of Panchayati Raj named Raebareli one of the country's 250 most backward districts (out of a total of 640). It is one of the 34 districts in Uttar Pradesh currently receiving funds from the Backward Regions Grant Fund Programme (BRGF).

Raebareli has also been nominated by the state government for receiving aid through central government's Smart Cities in India Programme.

Powerplant at Unchahar (National Thermal Power Limited, NTPC)

=== Agriculture ===
There are two main harvests, the kharif in autumn and the rabi in spring. As in other areas, the intermediate zaid harvest that takes place during the summer is far less significant. In general, kharif crops are sown over a wider area than rabi crops, but the latter are economically more valuable. During the 1970s, there was a significant increase in the area under rabi crops so that by 1981 it covered a larger area than kharif cropland.

==== Kharif crops ====
Rice is by far the most important kharif crop. The district is well-suited to rice cultivation: the northern part of the district is situated in a belt of clayey soil ideal for growing rice, and in the south, the lake-studded area between Dalmau, Raebareli, and Salon is also a major rice-growing region. There are two types of rice known as early (dhan or kuari) and late (jarhan). Late rice produces a higher yield per acre, but is more cost-intensive to produce. It involves transplanting the rice plants once they reach a height of 5 or 6 inches into special enclosures called jhatas that are reclaimed from lakes or marshes, or alternatively into adjoining land well-suited for irrigation. Late rice is sown after the onset of the monsoon rains and harvested in November. Its land is usually not used to grow rabi crops. Early rice, meanwhile, is more dependent on rainfall. It is sown in July and then weeding begins two weeks later. It is harvested in mid-September, and then in October the fields are prepared for rabi crops such as peas, barley, or wheat.

The other main kharif crop is juwar, which is the largest of the millets. It does best in loamy soils and is most extensively grown in the area around Dalmau. Juwar can do fairly well on its own without much intervention, and many farmworkers will mostly leave it alone between sowing and harvesting and devote their attention to other crops instead. Kodon, a smaller millet, is also grown widely in the district. Like juwar, it can succeed with minimal intervention. The two are often grown along with arhar.

Urd, along with other pulses like moth and mung, is generally grown in outlying fields or mixed in with groves. Sown in August and harvested in November, these crops are generally not irrigated and depend on good rains late in the season. Bajra is generally not very widely grown in the district, but it makes for an important crop in certain localities, particularly along the Sai. It is only grown in lighter soils, often mixed with arhar, and requires less rainfall than juwar — as long as the rain doesn't fail altogether, bajra typically provides a good harvest. Another fairly widespread crop is mandua, which is grown more in Raebareli district than in most parts of Awadh. Other crops grown during the kharif season include sunn hemp, oilseeds, groundnuts, onions, garlic, potatoes, and miscellaneous fruits and vegetables. The potato in particular is the main vegetable crop in the district.

==== Rabi crops ====
Among the rabi crops, the most important are wheat and barley. Wheat is economically more important than barley, although it is less extensively grown. It does best in light, loamy soil and is usually irrigated. Preparation of wheat fields begins before the monsoon rains come, when they are treated with manure, and then in late September they are cleared of weeds. The wheat is sown in early October, then given a first watering in early November once the plants reach 2 or 3 inches in height. The fields are again irrigated in December, and often also a third time in late January, and then the crop is harvested in late March and early April. As for barley, it is usually grown mixed with gram, although sometimes it's mixed with wheat instead, or grown alone. It is grown in all types of soil and usually is not irrigated, instead relying on good rains during the winter.

Gram is commonly grown either with barley or linseed. It does best in clayey soil and often is planted in fields that are also used to grow rice. It is planted in October and then nipped while young, before flowering, in order to improve growth. It ripens by March and the harvest is usually finished by the second week in April.

Among other rabi crops, peas are usually sown together with other crops such as barley or oilseeds. They are widely cultivated, and in drier seasons they provide an important source of income for farmers. Tobacco is not widely grown, although several villages have a reputation for producing it due to the brackish water in their wells. Kandrawan, Pirhi, and Oi are a few examples. As with the kharif season, the rabi also has cultivation of sunn hemp, oilseeds, groundnuts, onions, garlic, and potatoes, along with miscellaneous fruits and vegetables.

Although now banned, poppy was historically one of the most important crops grown in Raebareli district. Raebareli was one of the main poppy-producing districts in the region, and poppy was "the great rent-paying crop" in the district — on multiple occasions, income from poppy production was enough to pay the entire government revenue. Like wheat, poppy thrives best in lighter soils and was extensively irrigated; it was planted in late October and weeded soon after sprouting. The weeding, as well as irrigation, was repeated 3 or 4 times before the harvest in February and March. There was a dramatic increase in poppy cultivation in the late 19th century, peaking in 1884 and declining somewhat after that.

==== Zaid crops ====
The zaid harvest is a comparatively minor one — in 1980–1981, zaid croplands covered an area of just 8,223 hectares, compared to almost 200,000 hectares for the kharif and rabi crops. The main zaid crop is sanwan (Panicum miliaceum), a small-grained millet that grows fast and prefers stiffer soils. Melons are not widely grown; most melon production is along the course of the Sai. Hot-weather rice is also grown along the edges of lakes, swamps, and drainage channels. It is typically grown by making an embankment in a jhil when there is still plenty of water, and then emptying it of water and using that area to sow the rice. Irrigation is then brought in from outside.

==== Irrigation ====
Raebareli district has plenty of irrigation sources, both natural and artificial. Although typically shallow, the extensive lakes and jhils sprinkled across the district provide plenty of water to irrigate rice when the monsoon rains let up, and they also provide enough water for at least one or two waterings during the winter months. These natural sources are supplemented by a variety of artificial sources: wells, canals, tube wells, and lift irrigation. As of 2011, 82.2% of the total farmland in Raebareli district is irrigated. Of this, 51.2% is by canals, 48.3% is by tube wells, and 0.5% comes from other sources. As of 1998, the district had a canal network of 2,775 km along with 56,019 pumping stations, 382 government-owned and 9,460 privately owned tube wells, and 2,436 masonry wells.

=== Industry ===
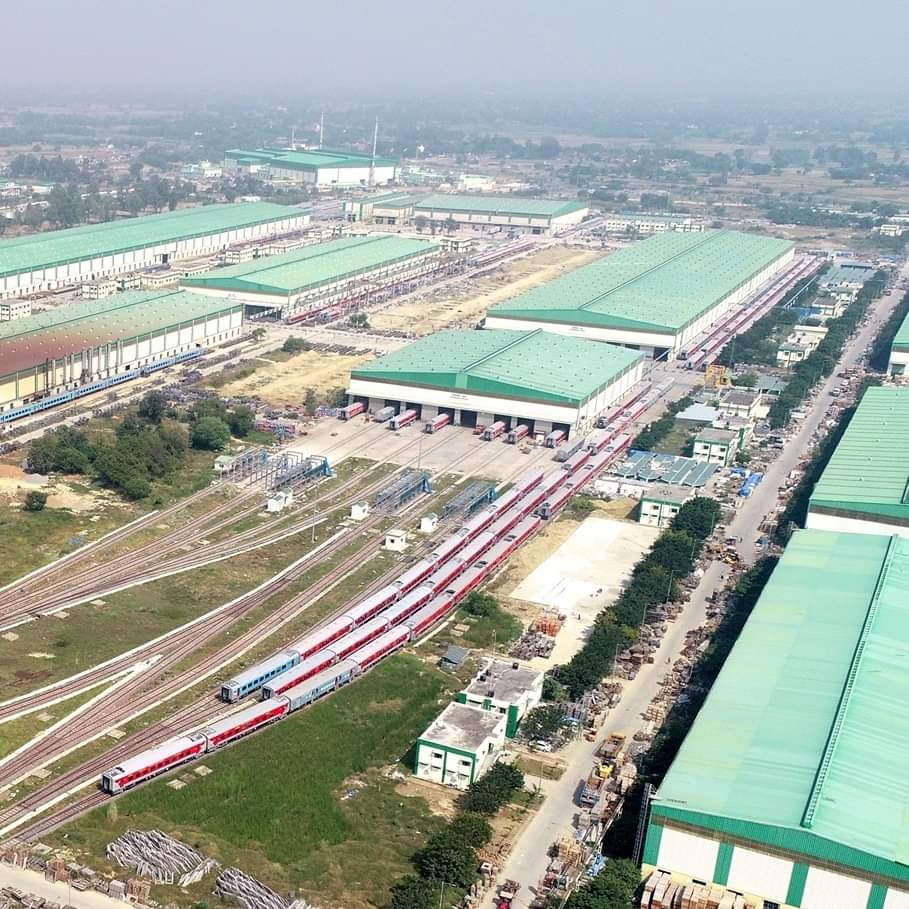
The Modern Coach Factory at Lalganj

Before the 1970s, there was no large-scale industry in Raebareli district. Between 1972 and 1982, 11 large industrial units opened in the district, collectively employing 6,000 people. These included factories belonging to Indian Telephone Industries Limited and to Modi Carpets, a textile mill, a spinning mill, a sugar mill, a paper mill, and manufacturers of soft drinks and high-tension insulators. As of 1982, there were 8 more large- and medium-scale units under construction, including two paper mills, two foundries, a magnesite-bauxite complex under UPSIDC, and a manufacturer of PVC power cables. The Modern Coach Factory at Lalganj, which commenced operation in 2012, covers an area of 541 hectares and employs up to 1,450 people in producing Linke Holfmann Busch (LHB) coaches for Indian Railways.

Small-scale industry also expanded dramatically in the district during the 1970s: from 291 registered units in 1972 to 1,354 as of July 1982. These included manufacturers of power transformers, electric cables, fertilizers, chlorinated wax, injection needles, PVC pipes, barbed wire, agricultural implements, leather goods, and furniture, among others. Other commodities currently produced by small-scale industries in Raebareli district include plastics, hosiery, footwear, lime, ice cream and other sweets, ayurvedic medicines, beedies, plywood, mats, baskets, and ropes.

== Demographics ==
Historical population
Year	Pop.	±% p.a.
1901	1,033,571	—
1911	1,016,689	−0.16%
1921	936,442	−0.82%
1931	974,237	+0.40%
1941	1,065,296	+0.90%
1951	1,157,461	+0.83%
1961	1,316,095	+1.29%
1971	1,504,187	+1.34%
1981	1,879,248	+2.25%
1991	2,309,928	+2.08%
2001	2,872,335	+2.20%
2011	3,405,559	+1.72%

Religions in residual Raebareli district (2011)
Religion	Percent
Hinduism	89.87%
Islam	9.64%
Other or not stated	0.49%
Distribution of religions

According to the 2011 census Raebareli district has a population of 3,405,559, roughly equal to the nation of Panama or the US state of Connecticut. This gives it a ranking of 97th in India (out of a total of 640). The district has a population density of 739 inhabitants per square kilometre (1,910/sq mi). Its population growth rate over the decade 2001-2011 was 18.51%. Rae Bareli has a sex ratio of 941 females for every 1000 males, and a literacy rate of 81.04%.

Post division into Amethi district and the remerging of Salon tehsil, it has a population of 2,903,507 and a sex ratio of 942 females per 1000 males. 9.70% of the district lives in urban areas. Scheduled Castes made up 30.58% of the population in the divided district.

=== Languages ===
Languages in Rai Bareli district (2011 census)
1. Hindi (94.7%)
2. Awadhi (3.56%)
3. Urdu (1.63%)
4. Others (0.14%)

At the time of the 2011 Census of India, in what is now Raebareli district 94.67% of the population in the district spoke Hindi (or a related language), 3.56% Awadhi and 1.60% Urdu as their first language. The local language is Awadhi but most people record their language as Hindi in the census.

== Transportation ==
Raebareli is on the route of National Highway 30, between Lucknow and Allahabad. Ring Road Raebareli is an outer bypass road and crosses the Sharda River.

Closest major airport to Raebareli is in Lucknow at about 78 kilometres (49 mi) distance on the National Highway 30. Other major airport is in Allahabad at 128 kilometres (79 mi) distance on National Highway 30.

Rae Bareli town is connected with Lucknow by a branch of the Oudh and Rohilkhand railway, which in 1898 was extended to Benares.

A rail line is being built from Raebareli to Akbarganj, on the Northern Railways network.
