= Baghuwar, Madhya Pradesh =

Village in Madhya Pradesh, India

Baghuwar (also pronounced Baghuvar) is a village located in the Narsinghpur district in the state of Madhya Pradesh, India. The village is located in the Jabalpur division of Madhya Pradesh. It is approximately 201 kilometres (125 mi) away from Bhopal, which is the capital city of Madhya Pradesh.

Since India's independence in 1947, Baghuwar has been the only village in India where no sarpanch is elected.

Every house in the village is reported to have a toilet and there are sewage lines in the village. Before the launch of the Swachh Bharat Mission by prime minister Narendra Modi, the villagers worked collectively to make the village Open Defecation-Free (ODF) in 2004. In 2012, the BBC reported that half of the homes in India have telephones but no toilets.

Baghuwar contains the highest number of biogas plants in Madhya Pradesh. These plants are used for cooking food and for providing light in the village.

== Population ==
At the 2011 census, Baghuwar had a population of 1,946 in 465 households. Baghuwar's Census Location code number in 2001 was 04812000 and its Census Location code number of 2011 was 491371.

The native language of Baghuwar is Hindi.

== Education ==
Baghuwar has achieved a 100% literacy rate. The villagers firmly believe that every child is entitled to an education. Because of this, they upgraded the school building with their own financial resources. They also ensured that nutritious mid-day meals were provided for students.

== Agriculture ==
The black soil in Baghuwar is suited to most types of cultivation. Rabi and kharif are the two seasons of cultivation in this village.

== Geography ==
Baghuwar extends over a surface area of 906.7 hectares (3.501 sq mi). Its geocoordinates are 23.24 latitude and 77.4 longitude.

The PIN code of the village is 487221. The telephone code is 07793.

== Surrounding villages ==
The villages close to Baghuwar include:

- Mohad
- Amheta
- Khiriya
- Biner
- Karoda
- Bamhori
- Amgaon
- Barodiya
- Tinsara
- Simariya Khurd
- Pipariya
