= Ranjitpur =

- Village
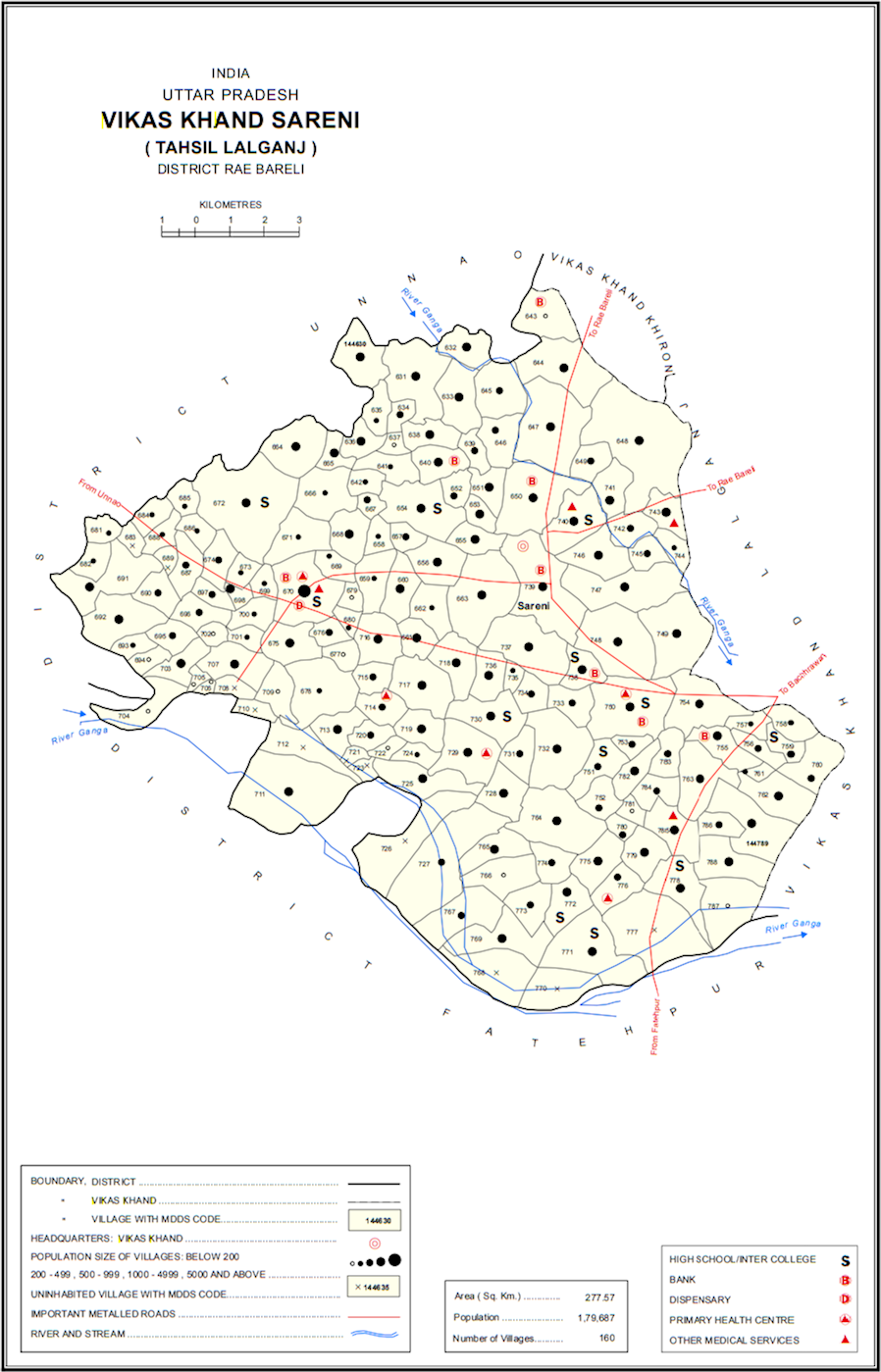
- Map showing Ranjitpur (#636) in Sareni CD block

- Location in Uttar Pradesh, India
- Coordinates: 26.182258°N 80.767425°E
- Country: India
- State: Uttar Pradesh
- District: Raebareli

Area
  - Total: 1.544 km^{2} (0.596 sq mi)

Population (2011)
  - Total: 1,122
  - Density: 726.7/km^{2} (1,882/sq mi)

Languages
  - Official: Hindi
- Time zone: UTC+5:30 (IST)
- Vehicle registration: UP-35

Ranjitpur is a village in Sareni block of Rae Bareli district, Uttar Pradesh, India. It is located 20 km from Lalganj, the tehsil headquarters. As of 2011, it has a population of 1,122 people, in 196 households. It has 2 primary schools and no healthcare facilities, and it hosts a regular market but not a weekly haat. It belongs to the nyaya panchayat of Rasulpur.

The 1951 census recorded Ranjitpur as comprising 2 hamlets, with a population of 497 people (262 male and 235 female), in 93 households and 72 physical houses. The area of the village was given as 261 acres. 15 residents were literate, all male. The village was listed as belonging to the pargana of Sareni and the thana of Sareni.

The 1961 census recorded Ranjitpur as comprising 2 hamlets, with a population of 523 people (256 male and 267 female), in 98 households and 81 physical houses. The area of the village was given as 261 acres.

The 1981 census recorded Ranjitpur as having a population of 717 people, in 126 households, and having an area of 106.43 hectares. The main staple foods were given as wheat and rice.

The 1991 census recorded Ranjitpur (as "Ramjipur") as having a total population of 816 people (444 male and 372 female), in 145 households and 145 physical houses. The area of the village was listed as 135 hectares. Members of the 0-6 age group numbered 117, or 14% of the total; this group was 55% male (64) and 45% female (53). Members of scheduled castes made up 1% of the village's population, while no members of scheduled tribes were recorded. The literacy rate of the village was 19% (133 men and 24 women). 252 people were classified as main workers (all men), while 0 people were classified as marginal workers; the remaining 564 residents were non-workers. The breakdown of main workers by employment category was as follows: 188 cultivators (i.e. people who owned or leased their own land); 64 agricultural labourers (i.e. people who worked someone else's land in return for payment); 0 workers in livestock, forestry, fishing, hunting, plantations, orchards, etc.; 0 in mining and quarrying; 0 household industry workers; 0 workers employed in other manufacturing, processing, service, and repair roles; 0 construction workers; 0 employed in trade and commerce; 0 employed in transport, storage, and communications; and 0 in other services.
