= Kahinjar =

Kahinjar Kahanjara, Kahanjar
- Village
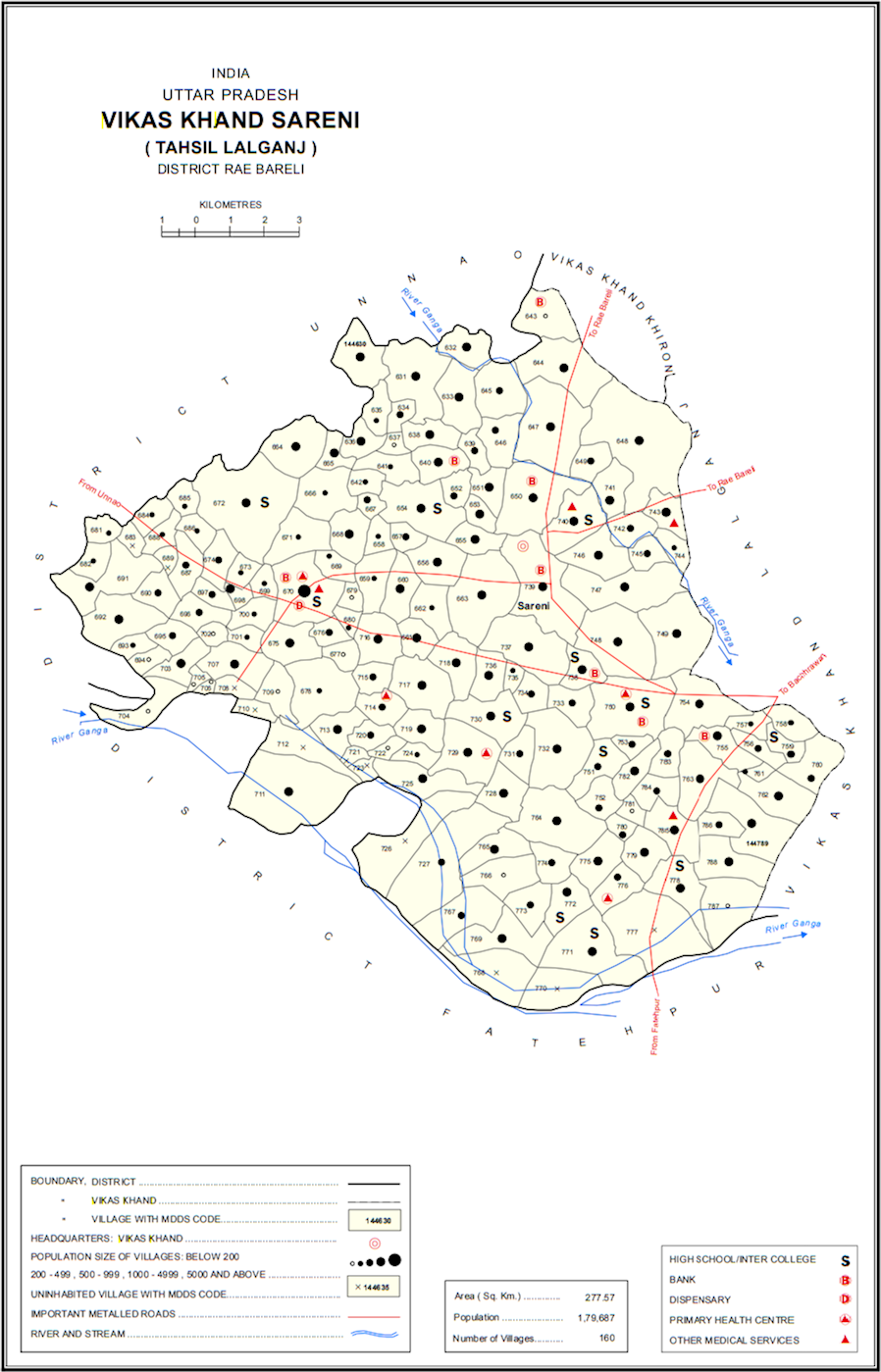
- Map showing Kahinjar (#633) in Sareni CD block

- Location in Uttar Pradesh, India
- Coordinates: 26.192227°N 80.803154°E
- Country: India
- State: Uttar Pradesh
- District: Raebareli

Area
  - Total: 2.258 km^{2} (0.872 sq mi)

Population (2011)
  - Total: 2,099
  - Density: 929.6/km^{2} (2,408/sq mi)

Languages
  - Official: Hindi
- Time zone: UTC+5:30 (IST)
- Vehicle registration: UP-35

Kahinjar is a village in Sareni block of Rae Bareli district, Uttar Pradesh, India. It is located 20 km from Lalganj, the tehsil headquarters. Kahinjar historically served as the headquarters of a mahal since at least the time of Akbar, before being merged into the pargana of Sareni under the Nawabs of Awadh. As of 2011, Kahinjar has a population of 2,099 people, in 354 households. It has one primary school and no healthcare facilities. It belongs to the nyaya panchayat of Rasulpur.

== History ==
Kahinjar is the Kahanjara mentioned in the late-16th-century Ain-i-Akbari as one of the mahals in the sarkar of Lucknow. It was held by the Bais Rajputs and paid a revenue of 818,472 dams to the imperial treasury and supplied the Mughal army with a force of 2,000 infantry and 100 cavalry. It was later merged with three other mahals to form the pargana of Sareni under the Nawabs of Awadh.

The 1951 census recorded Kahinjar as comprising 5 hamlets, with a total population of 727 people (392 male and 335 female), in 136 households and 119 physical houses. The area of the village was given as 570 acres. 35 residents were literate, all male. The village was listed as belonging to the pargana of Sareni and the thana of Sareni.

The 1961 census recorded Kahinjar as comprising 5 hamlets, with a total population of 830 people (439 male and 432 female), in 156 households and 141 physical houses. The area of the village was given as 570 acres.

The 1981 census recorded Kahinjar as having a population of 1,254 people, in 203 households, and having an area of 228.65 hectares. The main staple foods were given as wheat and rice.

The 1991 census recorded Kahinjar as having a total population of 1,481 people (720 male and 761 female), in 231 households and 231 physical houses. The area of the village was listed as 228 hectares. Members of the 0-6 age group numbered 282, or 19% of the total; this group was 53% male (149) and 47% female (133). Members of scheduled castes made up 35% of the village's population, while no members of scheduled tribes were recorded. The literacy rate of the village was 42% (382 men and 244 women). 411 people were classified as main workers (327 men and 84 women), while 0 people were classified as marginal workers; the remaining 1,070 residents were non-workers. The breakdown of main workers by employment category was as follows: 178 cultivators (i.e. people who owned or leased their own land); 207 agricultural labourers (i.e. people who worked someone else's land in return for payment); 0 workers in livestock, forestry, fishing, hunting, plantations, orchards, etc.; 0 in mining and quarrying; 2 household industry workers; 3 workers employed in other manufacturing, processing, service, and repair roles; 1 construction worker; 3 employed in trade and commerce; 0 employed in transport, storage, and communications; and 27 in other services.
