= Nisgar =

- Village
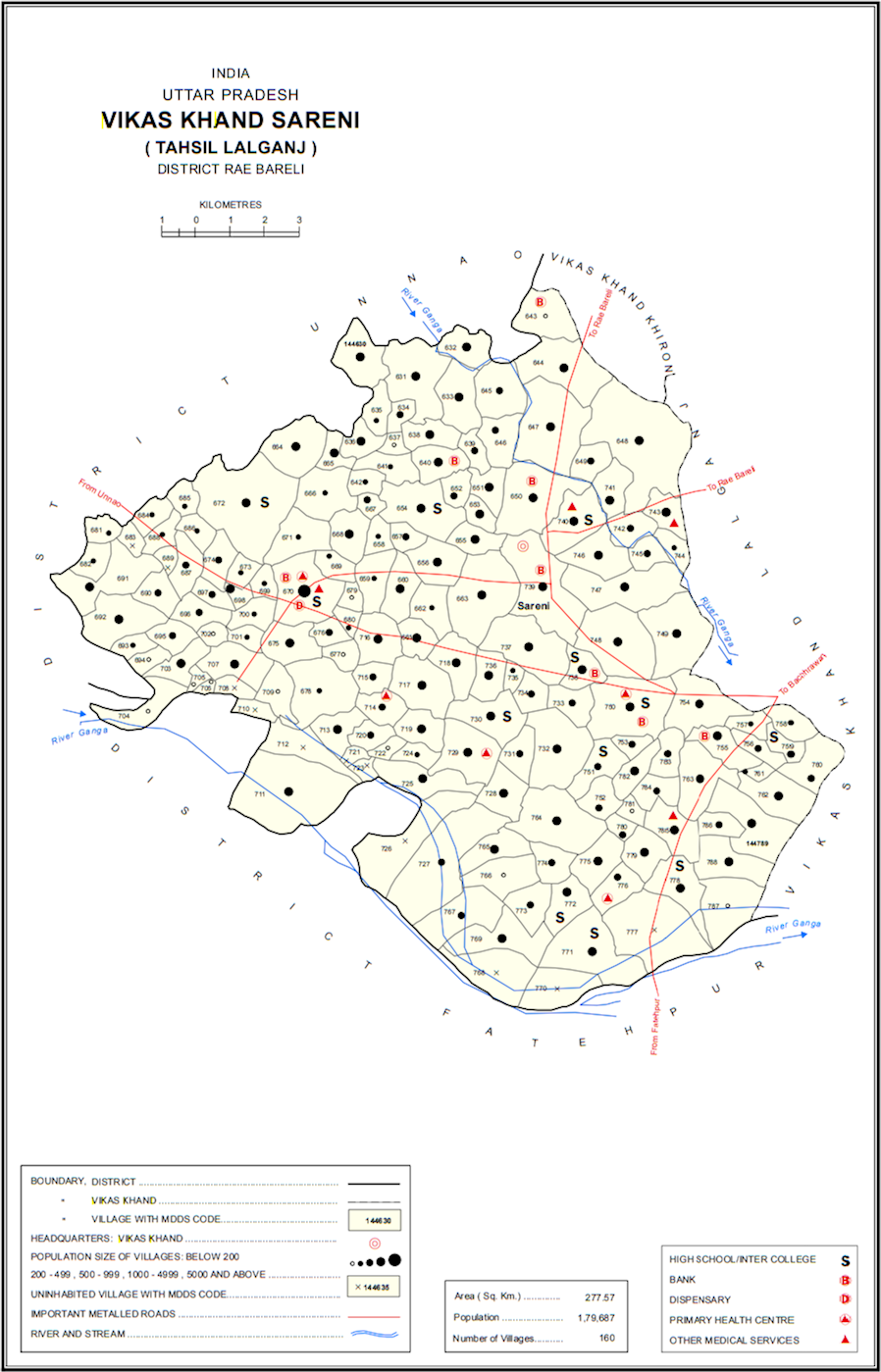
- Map showing Nisgar Mu. (#713) in Sareni CD block

- Location in Uttar Pradesh, India
- Coordinates: 26.10928°N 80.762443°E
- Country: India
- State: Uttar Pradesh
- District: Raebareli

Area
  - Total: 3.393 km^{2} (1.310 sq mi)

Population (2011)
  - Total: 2,352
  - Density: 693.2/km^{2} (1,795/sq mi)

Languages
  - Official: Hindi
- Time zone: UTC+5:30 (IST)
- Vehicle registration: UP-35

Nisgar is a village in Sareni block of Rae Bareli district, Uttar Pradesh, India. It is located on the bank of the Ganges, 23 km from the tehsil headquarters at Lalganj. Nisgar is mentioned in the late 16th-century Ain-i-Akbari as the seat of a mahal in the sarkar of Lucknow. It was later merged into the pargana of Sareni under the Nawabs of Awadh in the 1700s.

As of 2011, Nisgar has a population of 2,352 people, in 432 households. It has one primary school and no healthcare facilities, and does not host a permanent market or a weekly haat. On Kartik Purnima, the full moon during the month of Kartik, Nisgar hosts a small bathing fair in the Ganges called the Kalika fair.

The 1951 census recorded Nisgar as comprising 2 hamlets, with a total population of 1,088 people (540 male and 548 female), in 216 households and 208 physical houses. The area of the village was given as 871 acres. 262 residents were literate, 193 male and 69 female. The village was listed as belonging to the pargana of Sareni and the thana of Sareni. Nisgar had a primary school at that point, which on 1 January had 85 students in attendance.

The 1961 census recorded Nisgar as comprising 2 hamlets, with a total population of 1,282 people (621 male and 661 female), in 255 households and 226 physical houses. The area of the village was given as 871 acres,

The 1981 census recorded Nisgar as having a population of 1,644 people, in 299 households, and having an area of 384.87 hectares. The main staple foods were given as wheat and gram.

The 1991 census recorded Nisgar Mu. as having a total population of 1,842 people (918 male and 924 female), in 298 households and 297 physical houses. The area of the village was listed as 339 hectares. Members of the 0-6 age group numbered 338, or 18% of the total; this group was 51% male (173) and 49% female (165). Members of scheduled castes made up 28% of the village's population, while no members of scheduled tribes were recorded. The literacy rate of the village was 35% (444 men and 199 women). 544 people were classified as main workers (442 men and 102 women), while 0 people were classified as marginal workers; the remaining 1,298 residents were non-workers. The breakdown of main workers by employment category was as follows: 257 cultivators (i.e. people who owned or leased their own land); 196 agricultural labourers (i.e. people who worked someone else's land in return for payment); 1 worker in livestock, forestry, fishing, hunting, plantations, orchards, etc.; 0 in mining and quarrying; 4 household industry workers; 6 workers employed in other manufacturing, processing, service, and repair roles; 1 construction worker; 34 employed in trade and commerce; 3 employed in transport, storage, and communications; and 42 in other services.
