= Kathwara, Raebareli =

Kathwara Kathwāra
- Village
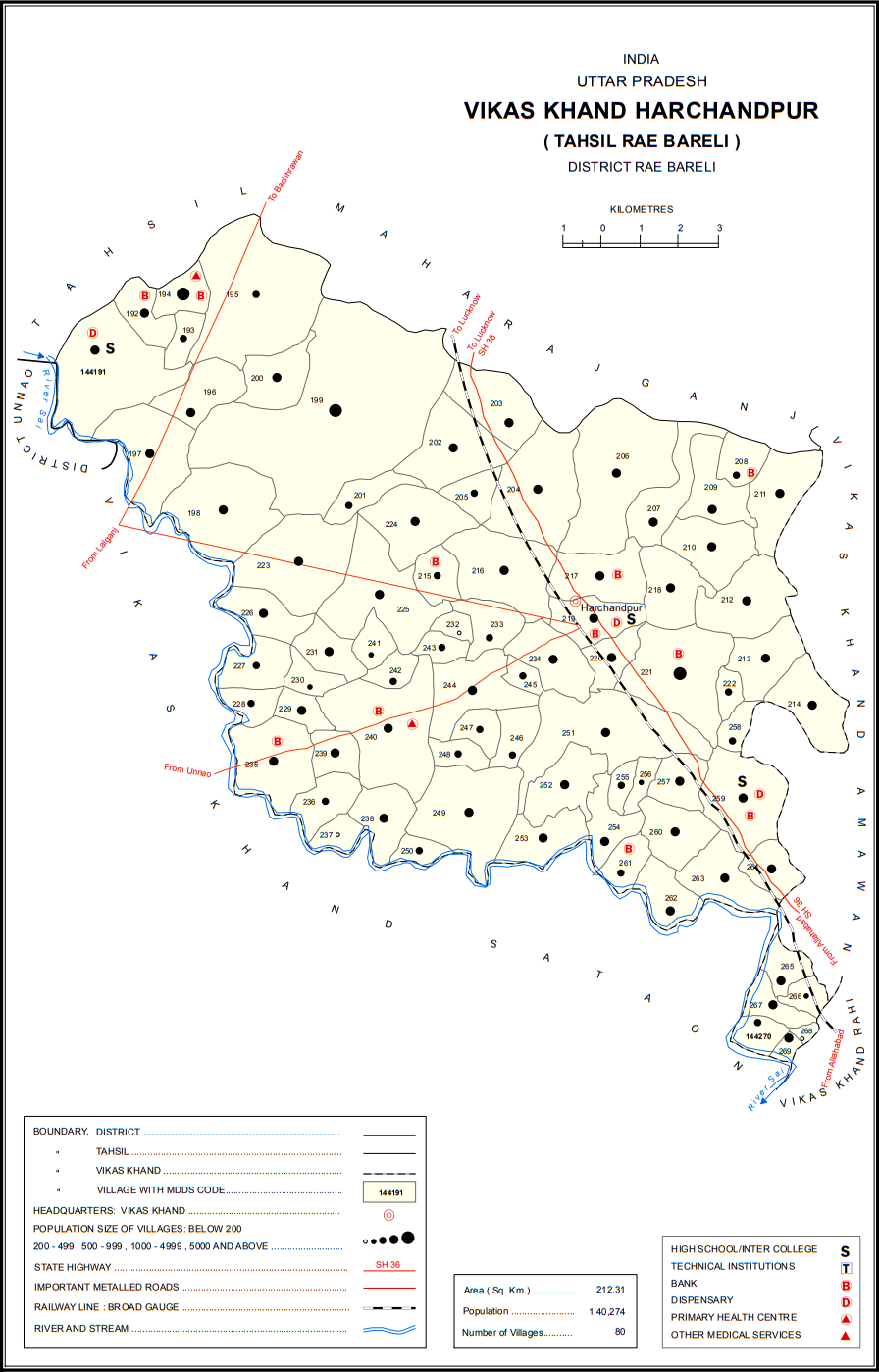
- Map showing Kathwara (#221) in Harchandpur CD block

- Location in Uttar Pradesh, India
- Coordinates: 26.322148°N 81.187475°E
- Country India: India
- State: Uttar Pradesh
- District: Raebareli

Area
  - Total: 5.134 km^{2} (1.982 sq mi)

Population (2011)
  - Total: 5,115
  - Density: 996.3/km^{2} (2,580/sq mi)

Languages
  - Official: Hindi
- Time zone: UTC+5:30 (IST)
- Vehicle registration: UP-35

Kathwara is a village in Harchandpur block of Rae Bareli district, Uttar Pradesh, India. It is located 13 km from Raebareli, the district headquarters, on the road to Lucknow, and on the left bank of the Baita river not far from its confluence with the Sai. The railway passes by Kathwara, and the closest station is at Harchandpur. As of 2011, the population of Kathwara is 5,115, in 921 households. It has two primary schools and no healthcare facilities.

== History ==
At the turn of the 20th century, Kathwara was described as a large but otherwise unremarkable village consisting of three mahals. Each mahal was held in single zamindari tenure, two by Sayyids and one by Sheikhs. It had a small marketplace called Shamsherganj, which was not very busy, as well as a primary school. Its population in 1901 was recorded as 2,622, including 1,031 Muslims.

The 1961 census recorded Kathwara as comprising 7 hamlets, with a total population of 2,095 people (1,123 male and 972 female), in 466 households and 439 physical houses. The area of the village was given as 1,276 acres.

The 1981 census recorded Kathwara as having a population of 3,365 people, in 636 households, and having an area of 515.18 hectares. The main staple foods were given as wheat and rice.
