= Thulendi =

Thulendi Ṭhulendī
- Village
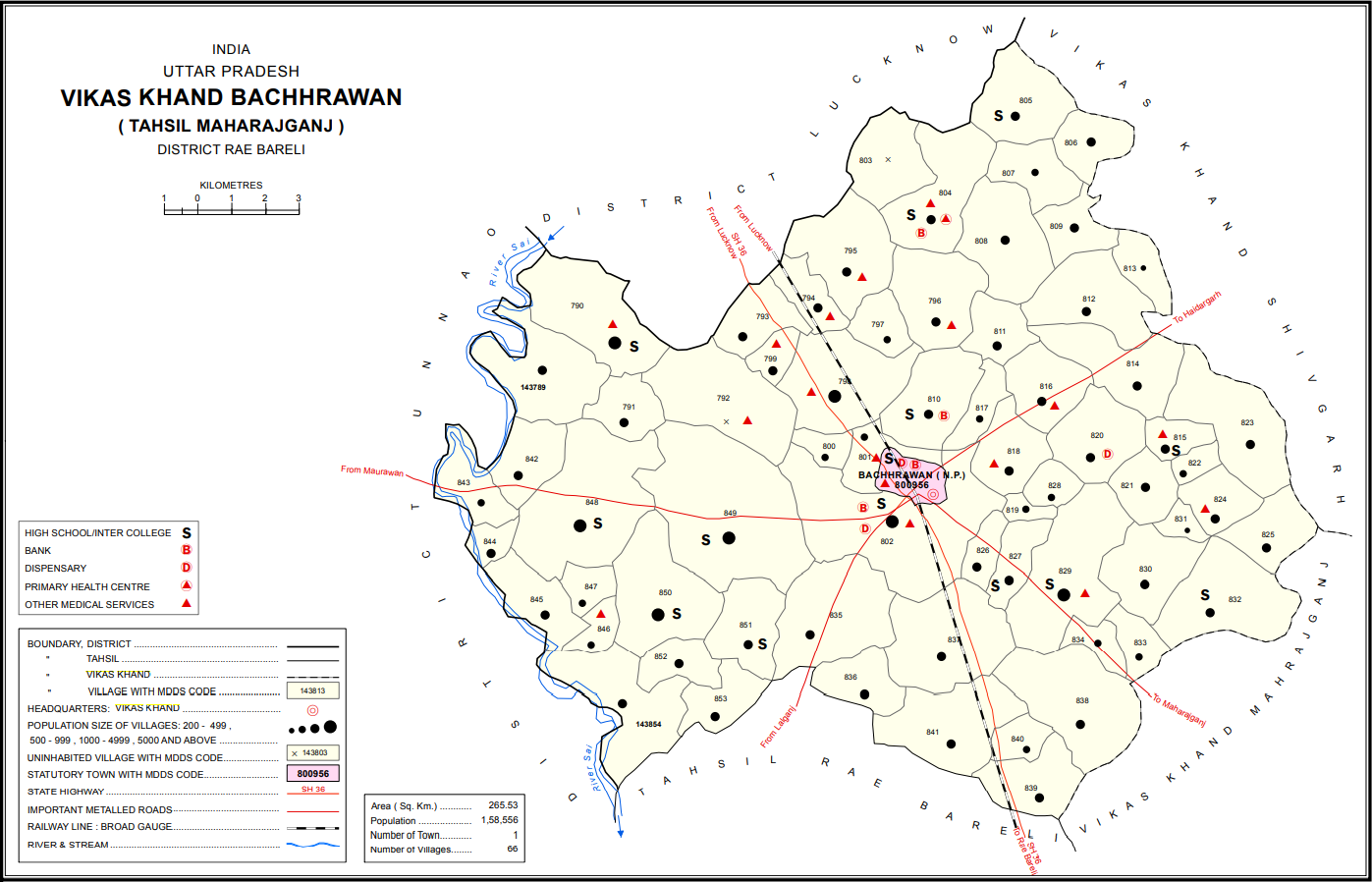
- Map showing Thulendi (#829) in Bachhrawan CD block

- Location in Uttar Pradesh, India
- Coordinates: 26.450743°N 81.150716°E
- Country India: India
- State: Uttar Pradesh
- District: Raebareli

Area
  - Total: 9.30 km^{2} (3.59 sq mi)

Population (2011)
  - Total: 6,616
  - Density: 711/km^{2} (1,840/sq mi)

Languages
  - Official: Hindi
- Time zone: UTC+5:30 (IST)
- Vehicle registration: UP-35

Thulendi is a village in Bachhrawan block of Rae Bareli district, Uttar Pradesh, India. It is located 6 km from Bachhrawan, the block headquarters, on an elevated plain with clayey soil. A historic village, Thulendi served as a pargana headquarters from the early 1400s until the late 1700s, and it has several old monuments including a fort built under the Jaunpur Sultanate and two large tanks othat are said to be even older. As of 2011, Thulendi's population was 6,616, in 1,195 households.

Thulendi hosts a fair on the first Friday in Jeth in honour of the 11th-century Muslim folk hero Ghazi Sayyid Salar Masud. Pilgrims bring banners and rest there for one night before proceeding to Satrikh and Bahraich.

== History ==
Thulendi was supposedly founded by a Bhar chieftain named Thula. It was then supposedly conquered from the Bhars by Malik Taj-ud-Din, a companion of the 11th-century Muslim folk hero Ghazi Sayyid Salar Masud. Malik Taj-ud-Din supposedly called the place "Maliknagar" and constructed the two large mud-built tanks in the village (one on the north side and the other on the south) called the "bara hauz" and the "chhota hauz". He was killed by the resurgent Bhars when they retook Thulendi, and his tomb is still extant.

In the early 1400s, Ibrahim Shah of the Jaunpur Sultanate made Thulendi the seat of a pargana. The old mud fort in Thulendi was built in 820 AH, during Ibrahim Shah's reign. Thulendi remained seat of a pargana until the late 1700s, under Asaf-ud-Daula, when the governor Raja Niwaz Singh relocated the headquarters to Bachhrawan. Raja Niwaz Singh built a large haveli in Thulendi that is still standing. He also built a sarai, but it was in ruins by the early 1900s.

At the turn of the 20th century, Thulendi was described as a large village or small town, surrounded by orchards and possessing several sites of historical interest. It had two masonry mosques, five temples of Mahadeo, a large primary school, and a bazar that held markets on Thursdays and Sundays. Its population in 1901 was 2,976, including 944 Muslims; the most prominent Hindu groups were the Pasis, the Brahmins, and the Muraos.

The 1961 census recorded Thulendi as comprising 7 hamlets, with a total population of 2,888 people (1,391 male and 1,497 female), in 624 households and 581 physical houses. The area of the village was given as 2,304 acres and it had a post office at the time.

The 1981 census recorded Thulendi as having a population of 3,968 people, in 870 households, and having an area of 929.97 hectares.
