= Singhaur Tara =

Singhaur Tara Singhaur Tāra
- Village
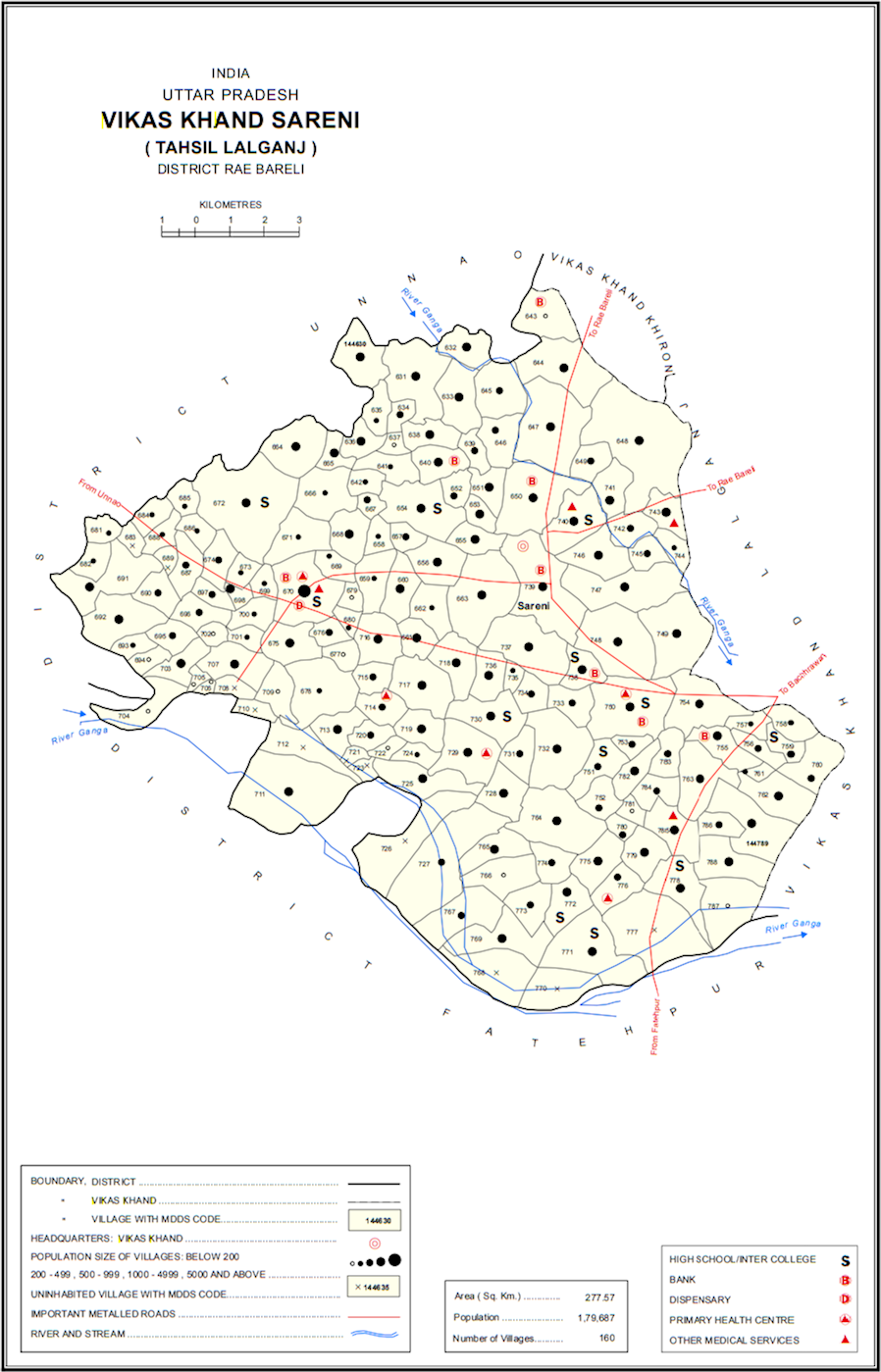
- Map showing Singhaur Tara Mu. (#788) in Sareni CD block

- Location in Uttar Pradesh, India
- Coordinates: 26.058631°N 80.878223°E
- Country: India
- State: Uttar Pradesh
- District: Raebareli

Area
  - Total: 4.11 km^{2} (1.59 sq mi)

Population (2011)
  - Total: 1,707
  - Density: 415/km^{2} (1,080/sq mi)

Languages
  - Official: Hindi
- Time zone: UTC+5:30 (IST)
- Vehicle registration: UP-35

Singhaur Tara is a village in Sareni block of Rae Bareli district, Uttar Pradesh, India. It is located on the bank of the Ganges, 18 km from the tehsil headquarters at Lalganj. Singhaur Tara is probably identical with the mahal called "Tara Singhaur" Ain-i-Akbari in the late 16th century. This mahal was in the sarkar of Lucknow. It was later merged into the pargana of Sareni under the Nawabs of Awadh in the 1700s.

As of 2011, Singhaur Tara has a population of 1,707 people, in 304 households. It has one primary school and no healthcare facilities, and does not host a permanent market or a weekly haat.

The 1951 census recorded Singhaur Tara (as "Singhaurtara") as comprising 9 hamlets, with a total population of 870 people (446 male and 424 female), in 158 households and 149 physical houses. The area of the village was given as 1,476 acres. 66 residents were literate, 64 male and 2 female. The village was listed as belonging to the pargana of Sareni and the thana of Sareni.

The 1961 census recorded Singhaur Tara (as "Singhaurtara") as comprising 9 hamlets, with a total population of 986 people (494 male and 492 female), in 187 households and 169 physical houses. The area of the village was given as 1,094 acres.

The 1981 census recorded Singhaur Tara as having a population of 1,252 people, in 208 households, and having an area of 410.76 hectares. The main staple foods were given as wheat and rice.

The 1991 census recorded Singhaur Tara (as "Sidhaur Tara Mu.") as having a total population of 1,478 people (737 male and 741 female), in 248 households and 248 physical houses. The area of the village was listed as 411 hectares. Members of the 0-6 age group numbered 284, or 19% of the total; this group was 51% male (145) and 49% female (139). Members of scheduled castes made up 20% of the village's population, while no members of scheduled tribes were recorded. The literacy rate of the village was 26% (299 men and 80 women). 501 people were classified as main workers (341 men and 160 women), while 66 people were classified as marginal workers (1 man and 65 women); the remaining 911 residents were non-workers. The breakdown of main workers by employment category was as follows: 348 cultivators (i.e. people who owned or leased their own land); 90 agricultural labourers (i.e. people who worked someone else's land in return for payment); 5 workers in livestock, forestry, fishing, hunting, plantations, orchards, etc.; 0 in mining and quarrying; 3 household industry workers; 4 workers employed in other manufacturing, processing, service, and repair roles; 0 construction workers; 6 employed in trade and commerce; 4 employed in transport, storage, and communications; and 51 in other services.
