= Johwa Sharki =

Johwa Sharki Johwa Sharqi
- Village
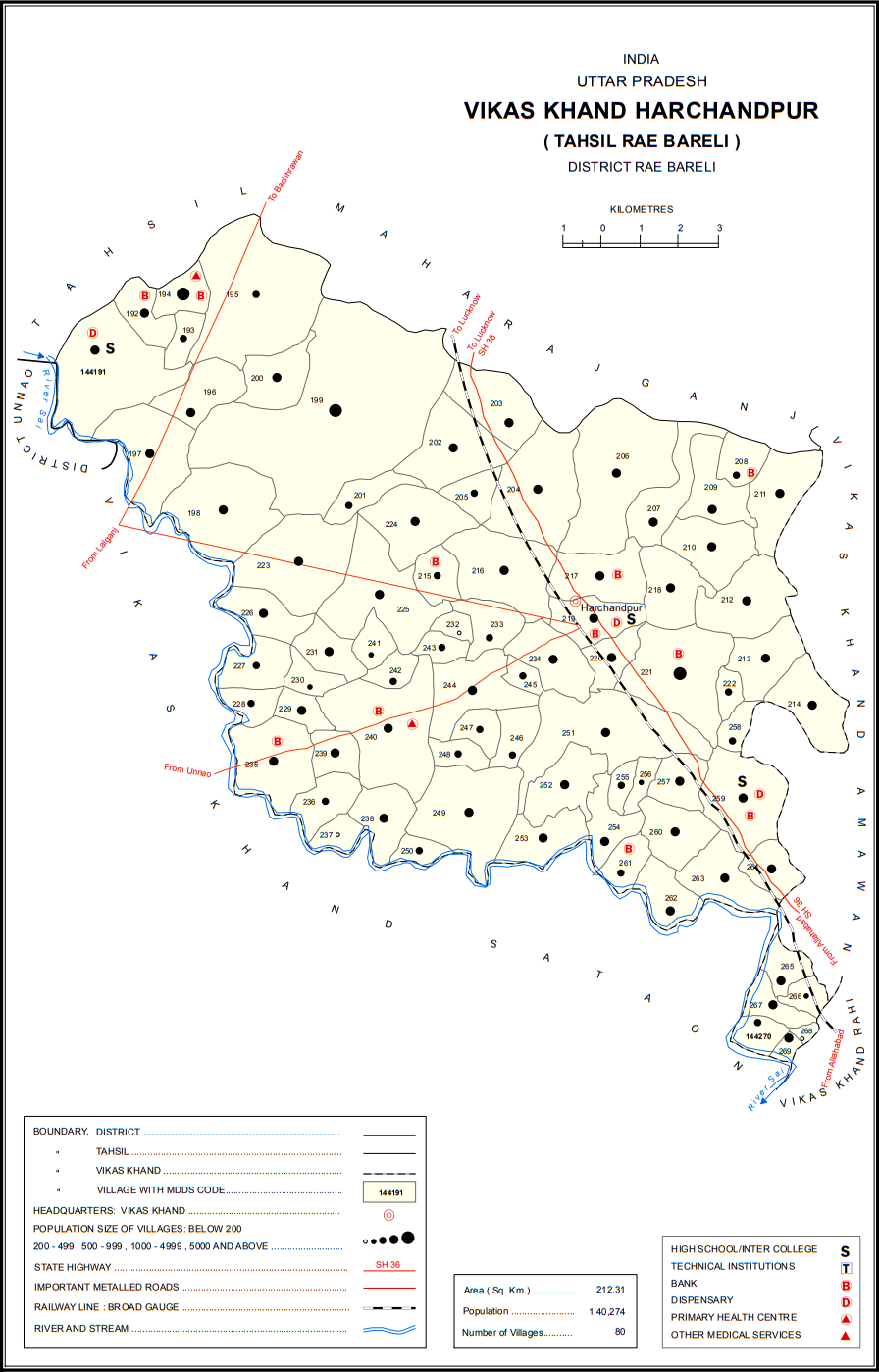
- Map showing Johwa Sharki (#199) in Harchandpur CD block

- Location in Uttar Pradesh, India
- Coordinates: 26.379908°N 81.095082°E
- Country India: India
- State: Uttar Pradesh
- District: Raebareli

Area
  - Total: 19.349 km^{2} (7.471 sq mi)

Population (2011)
  - Total: 10,657
  - Density: 550.78/km^{2} (1,426.5/sq mi)

Languages
  - Official: Hindi
- Time zone: UTC+5:30 (IST)
- Vehicle registration: UP-35

Johwa Sharki, also spelled Sharqi, is a village in Harchandpur block of Rae Bareli district, Uttar Pradesh, India. It is an especially large village with many hamlets spread out over a wide area. It lies a bit to the north of the river Sai, between the road from Bachhrawan to Lalganj on one side and the railway on the other. As of 2011, its population is 10,657, in 2,027 households. It has 4 primary schools and no healthcare facilities.

== History ==
An experimental agricultural bank was established in Johwa Sharki in 1901. That year, its population was recorded as 3,500 people, including 101 Muslims, and the biggest Hindu group by size was the Ahirs. At around that time, the village was described as being surrounded by orchards, and there were two large tanks — one on the north and the other on the east.

The 1961 census recorded Johwa Sharki (as "Johwa Sharqi") as comprising 18 hamlets, with a total population of 3,612 people (1,746 male and 1,866 female), in 880 households and 827 physical houses. The area of the village was given as 4,946 acres and it had a post office at that point.

The 1981 census recorded Johwa Sharki (as "Johwa Sarki") as having a population of 5,954 people, in 1,132 households, and having an area of 1,944.99 hectares. The main staple foods were given as wheat and rice.
