= Rasulpur, Sareni =

Rasulpur Rasūlpur
- Village
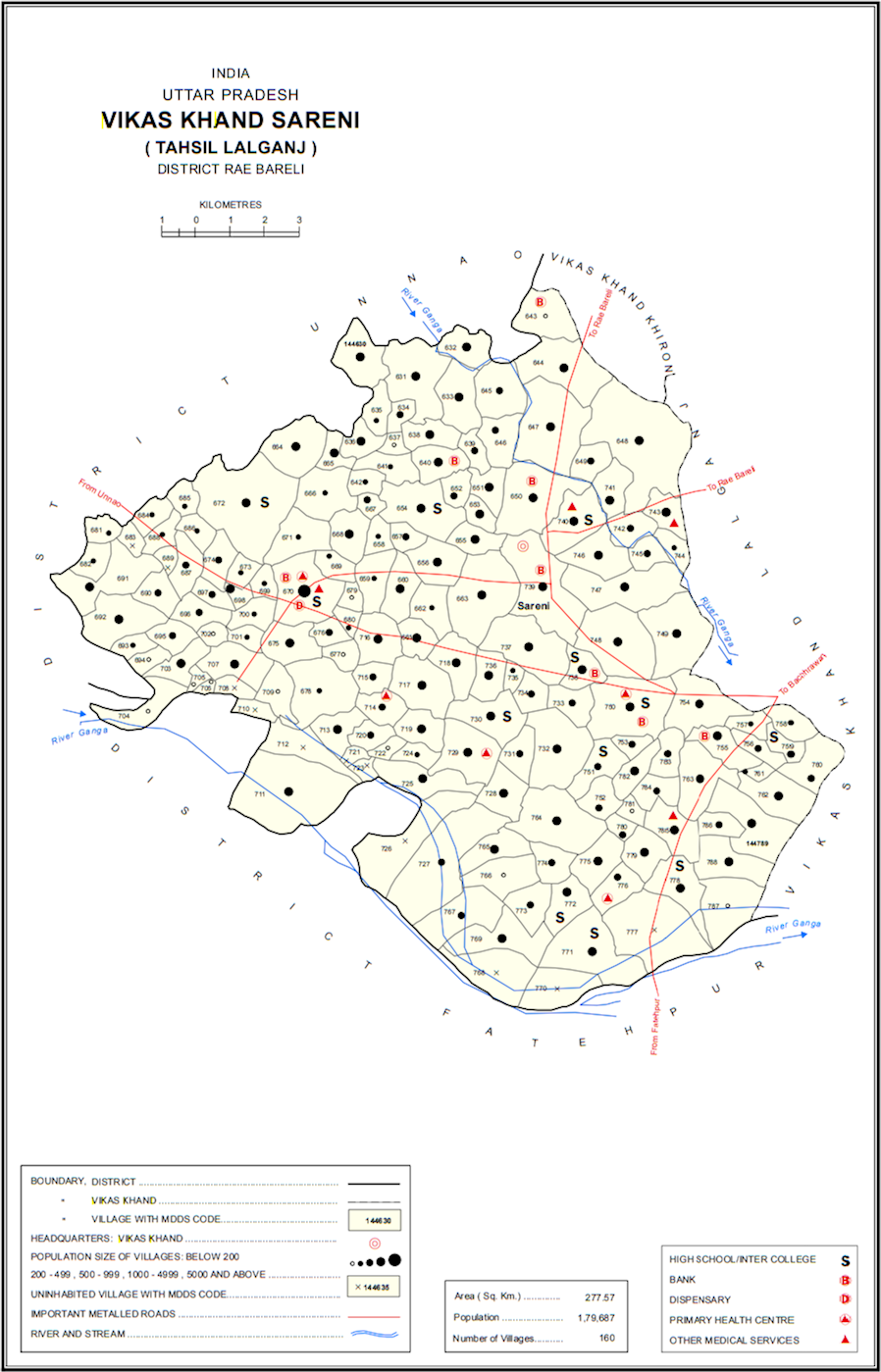
- Map showing Rasulpur (#640) in Sareni CD block

- Location in Uttar Pradesh, India
- Coordinates: 26.173216°N 80.792378°E
- Country: India
- State: Uttar Pradesh
- District: Raebareli

Area
  - Total: 1.279 km^{2} (0.494 sq mi)

Population (2011)
  - Total: 1,343
  - Density: 1,050/km^{2} (2,720/sq mi)

Languages
  - Official: Hindi
- Time zone: UTC+5:30 (IST)
- Vehicle registration: UP-35

Rasulpur is a village in Sareni block of Rae Bareli district, Uttar Pradesh, India. It is located 19 km from Lalganj, the tehsil headquarters. As of 2011, Rasulpur has a population of 1,343 people, in 257 households. It has two primary schools and no healthcare facilities. Rasulpur serves as the headquarters of a nyaya panchayat which also includes 12 other villages.

The 1951 census recorded Rasulpur as comprising 1 hamlet, with a total population of 738 people (379 male and 359 female), in 145 households and 113 physical houses. The area of the village was given as 330 acres. 36 residents were literate, 25 male and 11 female. The village was listed as belonging to the pargana of Sareni and the thana of Sareni.

The 1961 census recorded Rasulpur as comprising 1 hamlet, with a total population of 841 people (417 male and 424 female), in 155 households and 128 physical houses. The area of the village was given as 330 acres.

The 1981 census recorded Rasulpur as having a population of 1,084 people, in 181 households, and having an area of 128.69 hectares. The main staple foods were given as wheat and rice.

The 1991 census recorded Rasulpur as having a total population of 1,236 people (598 male and 638 female), in 196 households and 196 physical houses. The area of the village was listed as 130 hectares. Members of the 0-6 age group numbered 183, or 15% of the total; this group was 52% male (95) and 48% female (88). Members of scheduled castes made up 15% of the village's population, while no members of scheduled tribes were recorded. The literacy rate of the village was 51% (388 men and 238 women). 381 people were classified as main workers (289 men and 92 women), while 3 people were classified as marginal workers (all women); the remaining 851 residents were non-workers. The breakdown of main workers by employment category was as follows: 198 cultivators (i.e. people who owned or leased their own land); 84 agricultural labourers (i.e. people who worked someone else's land in return for payment); 0 workers in livestock, forestry, fishing, hunting, plantations, orchards, etc.; 4 in mining and quarrying; 0 household industry workers; 11 workers employed in other manufacturing, processing, service, and repair roles; 0 construction workers; 34 employed in trade and commerce; 1 employed in transport, storage, and communications; and 49 in other services.
