= Ring Road, Raebareli =

Road in Uttar Pradesh, India

Ring Road

Route information
- Maintained by NHAI
- Length: 39.96 km (24.83 mi)

Major junctions
- east end: Kuchariya
- west end: Didauli

Location
- Country: India
- States: Uttar Pradesh
- Major cities: Raebareli

Highway system
- Roads in India; Expressways; National; State; Asian

The Ring Road is an elevated section of road at Raebareli in Uttar Pradesh, India. It is an outer bypass road and crosses the Sharda River. It has been constructed to divert the traffic coming from Lucknow Road or Allahabad Road and vice versa, allowing vehicles to get to their destinations without entering the city of Raebareli. The Second phase is 22 km long with four lane road.

== History ==
It was a dream project of UPA Chairperson Sonia Gandhi, who represented the Raebareli constituency in the Lok Sabha. It was started in 2014 and was scheduled for completion in 2017, but was delayed and is not completed yet.

== Stretch ==
The Ring Road is a 17.96 km long and is a part of the east-west corridor. It will connect Raebareli-Lucknow Road (NH-30) with Raebareli-Allahabad (NH-30) via Raebareli-Ayodhya Road (NH-330A), Raebareli-Sultanpur Road (NH128) and Raebareli-Jaunpur Road (NH31). The total stretch of the flyover is 17 kilometres. The two-lane flyover has a uniform width and one side of the Sharda River. starts from Harchandpur at Lucknow Road and meets at Kuchariya at Allahabad Road.
