= Zaid crop =

Classification of crops harvested in summer in the Indian subcontinent

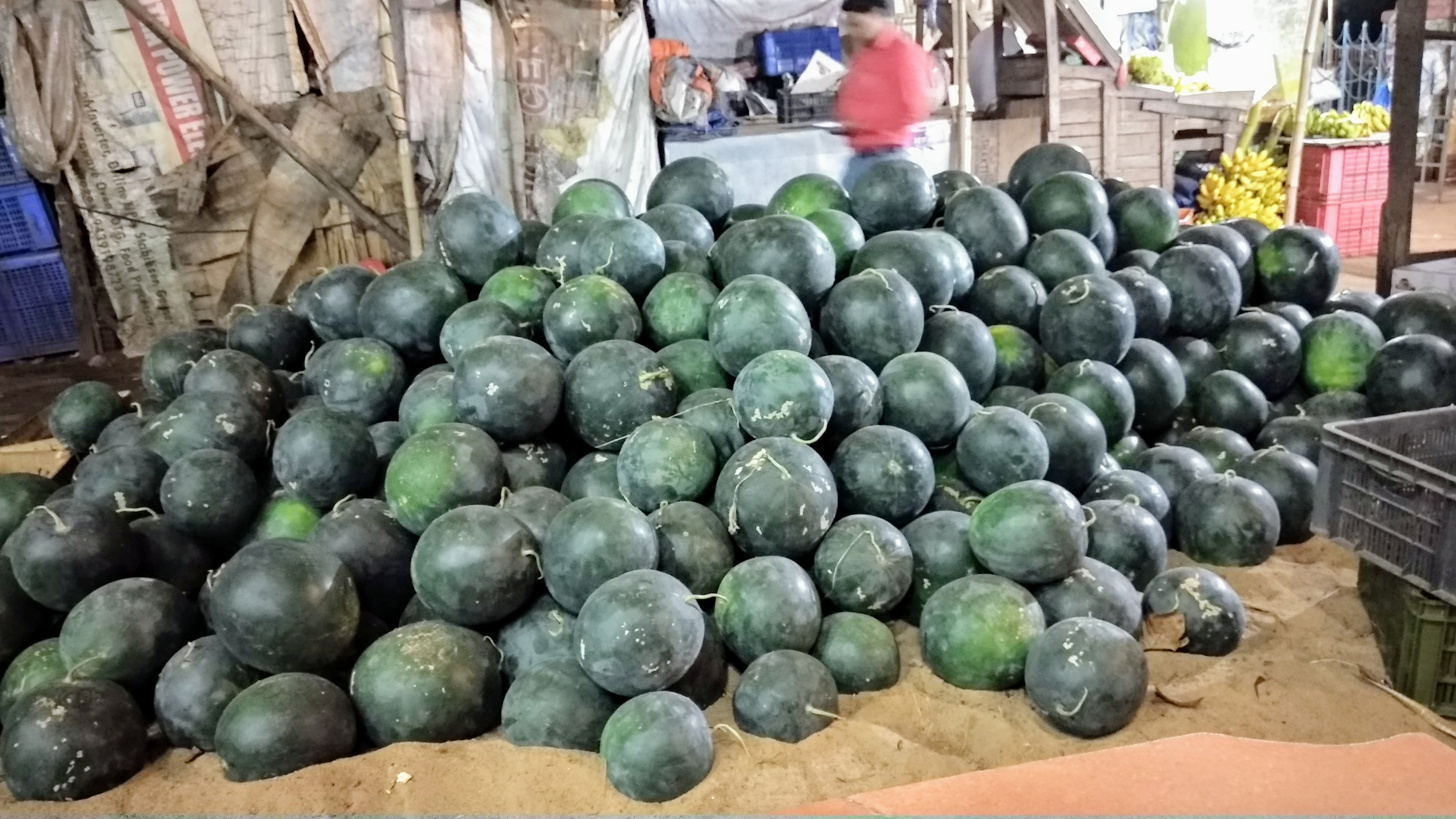
Watermelon (Citrullus lanatus) is one of the most widely cultivated Zaid cash crops across South Asia.

Zaid crops are short-duration summer crops cultivated in the Indian subcontinent during the inter-crop window between the Rabi (winter/spring) and Kharif (monsoon) agricultural seasons. The Zaid farming period primarily spans the warm, dry months from March to June.

== See also ==
- Agriculture in India
- Rabi crops
- Kharif crops
