= Rabi crop =

Classification of crops harvested in spring season in the Indian Subcontinent

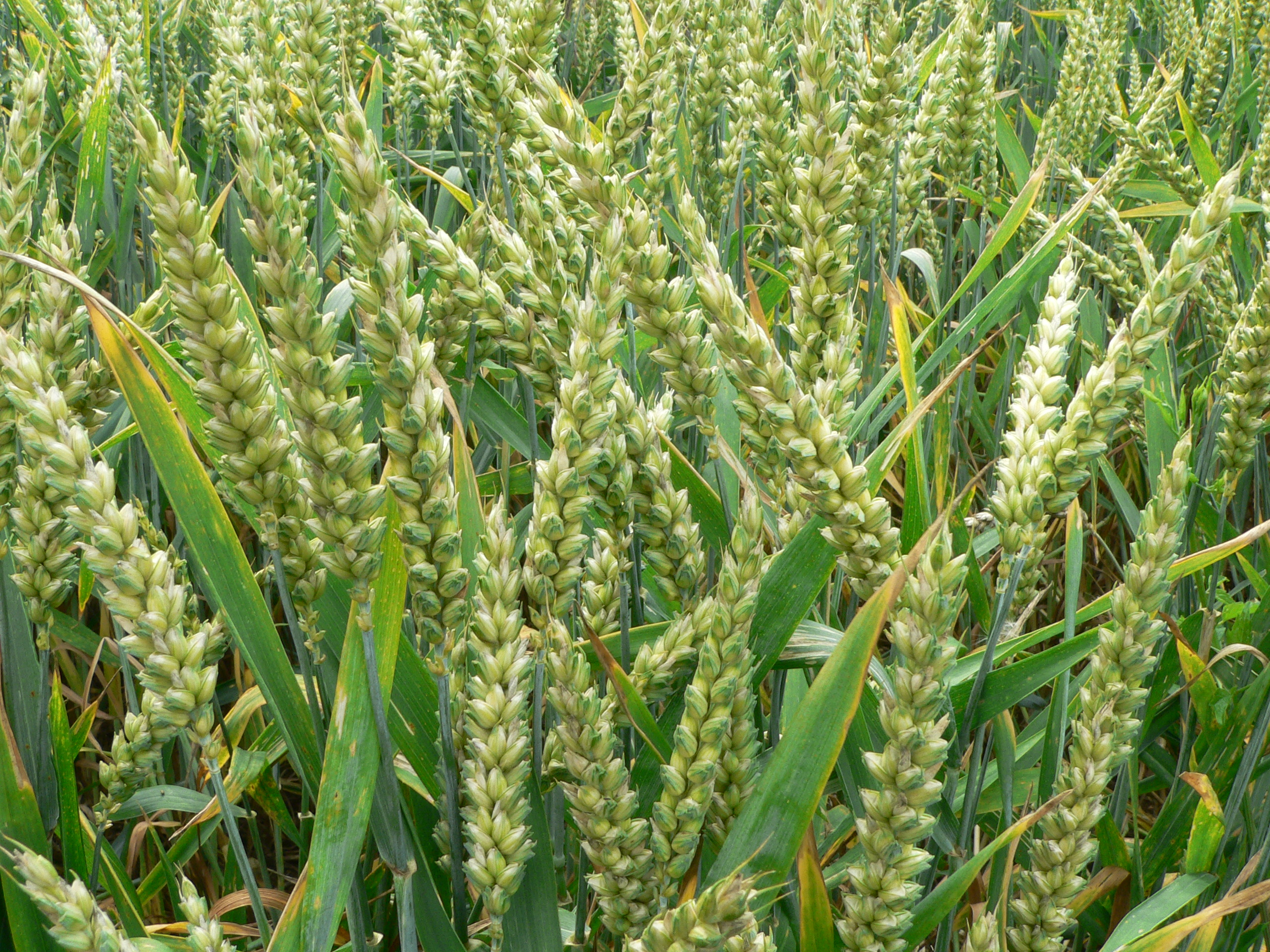
Wheat

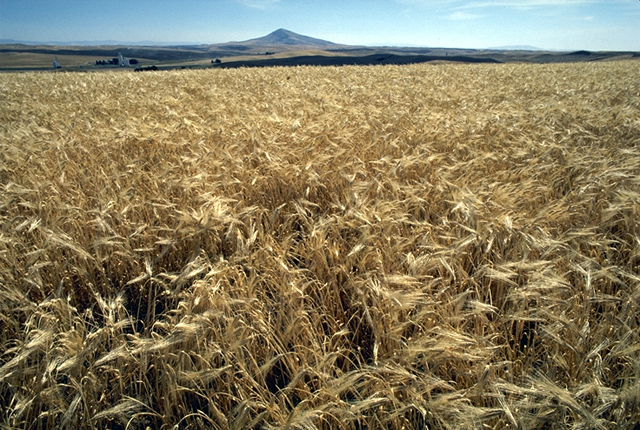
Barley

Rabi crops or the rabi harvest, also known as winter crops, are agricultural crops that are sown in winter and harvested in the spring in India, Pakistan, and Bangladesh. Complementary to the rabi crop is the kharif crop, which is grown after the rabi and zaid crops are harvested one after another respectively.

The word rabi was borrowed from Persian: ربيع, romanized: rabī, lit. 'spring'.

== Etymology ==
The words kharif and rabi have their origins in Arabic. These came to be used in India with the ascent of the Mughal empire in the Indian subcontinent and have been widely used ever since. The term is derived from the Arabic word for "spring", which is used in the Indian subcontinent, where it is the spring harvest (also known as the "winter crop").

== Rabi season in India ==
Rabi crops are sown around mid-November, preferably after the monsoon rains are over, and harvesting begins in April / May. The crops are grown either with rainwater that has percolated into the ground or using irrigation. Good rain in winter spoils rabi crops but is good for kharif crops.

The major rabi crop in India is wheat, followed by barley, mustard, sesame and peas. Peas are harvested early, as they are ready early: Indian markets are flooded with green peas from January to March, peaking in February.

Many crops are cultivated in both kharif and rabi seasons. The crops produced in India are seasonal and highly dependent on these two monsoons. The table below contains a list of differences between the three cropping seasons in India.

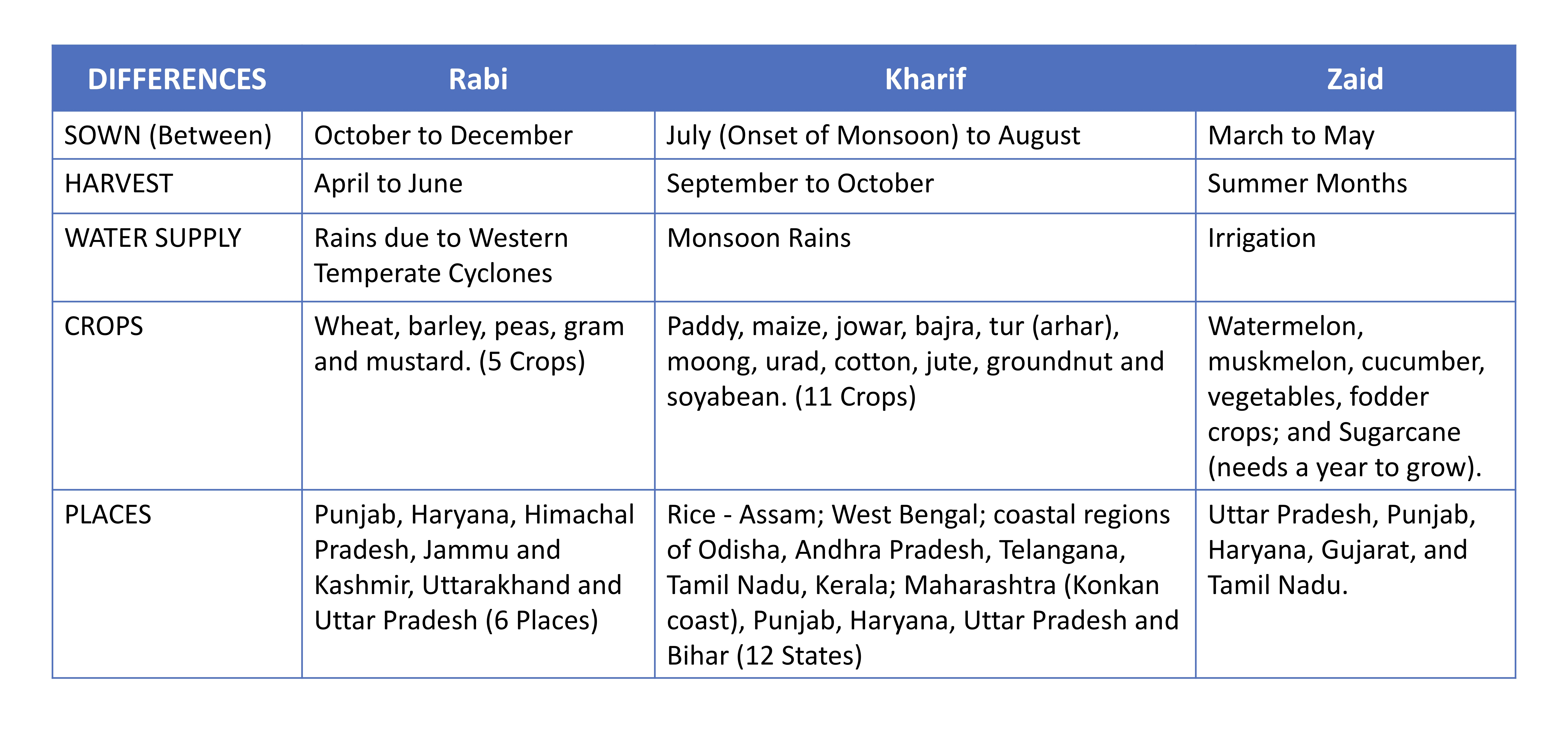

The Indian government also offers Minimum Support Price for these crops, so that the farmers can benefit from the harvest.

== Common rabi crops ==
=== Cereals ===
- barley
- oat (Avena sativa)
- Wheat

=== Fruits ===
List as follows. These are rabi harvests rather than crops as that term is usually applied to annuals and not perennials:

- banana
- ber
- date
- grape
- grape fruit
- guava
- kinnow
- lemon
- lime
- mandarin orange
- mangoes
- mulberries
- orange

=== Legumes / lentils (dal) ===
- chickpea
- kulthi (horse gram)
- lobhia
- masoor
- pigeon pea

=== Seed plants ===
- alfalfa (also known as lucerne, Medicago sativa)
- coriander (Coriandrum sativum, L)
- cumin (Cuminum cyminum, L)
- fenugreek (Trigonella foenumgraecum, L)
- linseed
- mustard (Brassica juncea L.)
- isabgol (Plantago ovata)
- sunflower
- Bengal gram
- red gram
- black pepper

=== Vegetables ===
- bean
- beetroot (chukundar)
- brinjal (baingan)
- broccoli (hari gobhi)
- cabbage (patta gobhi)
- capsicum (shimla mirch)
- carrot (gajar)
- cauliflowers (gobhi)
- chickpea (also known as gram, Cicer arientinum) (chana)
- fenugreek (methi)
- garlic (lehsun)
- lady finger (bhindi)
- lettuce (salad gobhi)
- pea (matar)
- onion (Allium cepa, L.) (pyaj)
- potato (Solanum tuberosum) (urulai kizhangu) (aloo)
- radish (mooli)
- spinach (palak)
- sweet potato (shakarkand)
- tomato (Solanum lycopersiucum, L) (tamatar)
- turnip (shalgam)

=== Others ===
- tobacco

== See also ==
- Zaid crops, a minor cropping season (summer) in the Indian Subcontinent
- Kharif crop, a major cropping season based on the Arriving Monsoon in the Indian Subcontinent
- Cash crop
- Winter wheat, a crop grown in winter in colder climates
