= Sareni, Uttar Pradesh =

Sareni
- Village
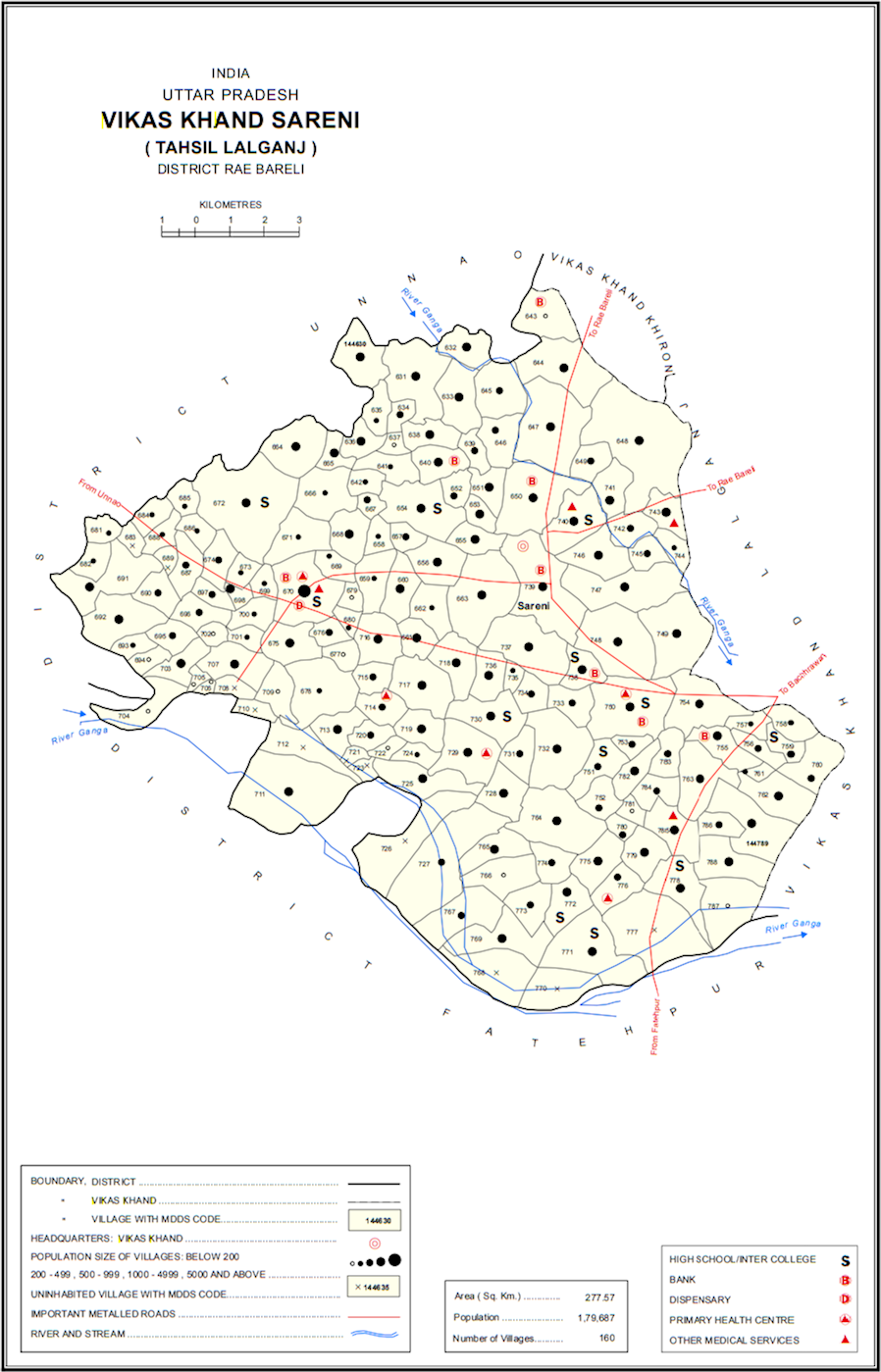
- Map of Sareni CD block

- Location in Uttar Pradesh, India
- Coordinates: 26.149112°N 80.828787°E
- Country: India
- State: Uttar Pradesh
- District: Raebareli

Area
  - Total: 4.523 km^{2} (1.746 sq mi)

Population (2011)
  - Total: 4,819
  - Density: 1,065/km^{2} (2,759/sq mi)

Languages
  - Official: Hindi
- Time zone: UTC+5:30 (IST)
- Vehicle registration: UP-33

Sareni is a village and corresponding community development block in Lalganj tehsil of Rae Bareli district, Uttar Pradesh, India. Historically the seat of a pargana, it is located 18 km from Lalganj, the tehsil headquarters, on the road to Daundia Khera in Unnao district. As of 2011, Sareni has a population of 4,819 people, in 792 households. It has 3 primary schools and no healthcare facilities Subedar major Babu Singh native of Bahadurpur making keen effort in development of local society like cleaners schools Prathmik Swasthya Kendra . It serves as the headquarters of a nyaya panchayat which also includes 10 other villages.

== History ==
Sareni was supposedly first founded by a member of the Bais clan named Sarang Sah. It was first made headquarters of a pargana and tehsil during the reign of Saadat Ali Khan (which one is not specified in the source). Previously, the pargana had been part of four different mahals: Kahanjara, Nisgar, Deorakh, and Tara Singhaur.

At the turn of the 20th century, Sareni had a police station, a post office, a cattle pound, and a large primary school. It was held in taluqdari tenure by the Rana of Khajurgaon, as part of the Murarmau estate. The population in 1901 was 1,458, including a Muslim minority of 202.

The 1951 census recorded Sareni as comprising 7 hamlets, with a total population of 1,466 people (779 male and 687 female), in 281 households and 149 245 houses. The area of the village was given as 1,197 acres. 153 residents were literate, 147 male and 6 female. The village was listed as belonging to the pargana of Sareni and the thana of Sareni.

The 1961 census recorded Sareni as comprising 5 hamlets, with a total population of 1,883 people (955 male and 928 female), in 334 households and 290 physical houses. The area of the village was given as 1,197 acres and it had a medical practitioner and post office at that point. It also had the following small industrial establishments: 1 grain mill, 1 maker of clothing, 2 makers of wooden products not further classified, and 1 maker of jewellery or precious metal items. The village's police staff consisted of 2 sub-inspectors, 1 head constable, and 14 constables.

The 1981 census recorded Sareni as having a population of 2,575 people, in 414 households, and having an area of 457.70 hectares. The main staple foods were given as wheat and rice.

The 1991 census recorded Sareni as having a total population of 3,419 people (1,777 male and 1,642 female), in 583 households and 583 physical houses. The area of the village was listed as 458 hectares. Members of the 0-6 age group numbered 707, or 21% of the total; this group was 56% male (396) and 44% female (311). Members of scheduled castes made up 19% of the village's population, while no members of scheduled tribes were recorded. The literacy rate of the village was 40% (950 men and 406 women). 919 people were classified as main workers (786 men and 133 women), while 2 people were classified as marginal workers (both women); the remaining 2,498 residents were non-workers. The breakdown of main workers by employment category was as follows: 280 cultivators (i.e. people who owned or leased their own land); 253 agricultural labourers (i.e. people who worked someone else's land in return for payment); 2 workers in livestock, forestry, fishing, hunting, plantations, orchards, etc.; 0 in mining and quarrying; 38 household industry workers; 66 workers employed in other manufacturing, processing, service, and repair roles; 4 construction workers; 133 employed in trade and commerce; 9 employed in transport, storage, and communications; and 134 in other services.

== Villages ==
Sareni CD block has the following 160 villages:

Village name	Total land area (hectares)	Population (in 2011)
Samodha	183.8	1,604
Ibrahimpur	12.2	2,372
Deopur	144	1,737
Kahinjar	225.8	2,099
Umrapur	54.4	675
Lakhai Khera	106.2	327
Ranjeetpur	154.4	1,122
Daspur	124.5	7
Kaji Khera	41.1	1,215
Ram Khera	100.8	896
Rasulpur	127.9	1,343
Binnawan	89.2	485
Rahim Khera	72.6	440
Chandpur	132	128
Sabji Babura	283	1,724
Khaund	6.6	893
Pithupur	88.7	928
Prem Chak	296.2	2,535
Pahuri	588	4,190
Kushal Khera	76.1	514
Ghure Mau	496.4	4,072
Sotawa Khera	59.9	1,244
Surjapur	56.4	866
Khanpur	127.8	1,058
Murar Mau	336.1	2,999
Hullapur	240.7	1,864
Kondara	112.5	1,334
Mahrajpur	82.6	526
Rampur Khurd	41	303
Mangadpur	68.3	403
Kati Khaa	164.7	1,141
Rani Khera	118.7	1,451
Bithuli	108.8	456
Palti Khera	333.6	2,641
Barvaliya	224.2	1,799
Gajpati Khera	82.4	1,273
Tal Kataila	284.6	471
Lalpur	46.2	510
Chhatauna	75.9	1,002
Dundi	58.4	476
Bhojpur	474.9	7,173
Nijam Khera	60.9	222
Usuru	617.4	3,428
Madnapur	90.9	342
Pathak Khera	50.3	566
Tiwaripur Kalan	96	1,001
Patakpur Urf Ranapur	99.2	618
Jai Gopalpur	25.7	7
Tiwaripur Khurd	66.9	338
Terui	40.1	53
Mohanpur	28.5	285
Durjanpur	49	464
Bhawa Khera	58.4	315
Chak Kantu	24	0
Sahide Mau	71.3	343
Mailaspur	87.6	403
Jarwal	80.7	464
Kheman Khera	95.4	584
Chandraman Khera	57.1	485
Basu Khera	59.5	0
Jhulpur	119.3	676
Chahotar	267.5	2,063
Madhopur	211.7	1,702
Sarhapur	74.6	245
Gandu Mau	9.6	21
Daulatpur	99.2	553
Chinta Khera	121.8	741
Haibatpur Khurd	88	770
Lachhai Khera	52.8	1,239
Rajapur	62.8	266
Dalipur	62.1	331
Gosa Khera	20.4	322
Chak Kanti	32.6	156
Haripur Mu.	163.4	1,474
Haripur Aht.	304.5	6
Bhupatpur Mu.	31.7	8
Bhupatpur Aht.	208.8	22
Gahrauli Mu.	272.1	3,336
Gahrauli Aht.	221.5	0
Purushottampur Mu.	146.6	161
Purushottampur Aht.	105.2	0
Kotiya Aht.	1,078.4	2,101
Nisgaraht.	850.1	0
Nisgar Mu.	339.3	2,352
Kasba Badlu	104.8	695
Kashi Khera	63.2	708
Bisayakpur	128.5	1,055
Nibi	256.9	1,708
Dulapur	260.4	1,950
Rawatpur Kalan	106.1	2,009
Jagannathpur Mu.	146.3	644
Jagannathpur Aht.	10	0
Alipur Mu.	125.4	73
Alipur Aht.	23	0
Puranpur	83.5	491
Sarai Khande Mu.	306.3	1,667
Sarai Khande Aht.	305.6	0
Gonda	117.1	723
Saidapur	95.1	1,064
Dudhwan	356.6	2,638
Raipur	204.4	1,672
Bahupur	97.6	512
Hamir Gaon	812	2,700
Ghuri Khera	78.1	580
Bhawanipur	110.5	623
Chhamani Khera	42	352
Murdipur Majhigawa	93.3	1,222
Govindpur	248.2	1,525
Bahadurpur	106.4	1,624
Sareni (block headquarters)	452.3	4,819
Lakhanapur	197.3	2,447
Madai Khera	185	1,322
Dhagaicha	90.9	646
Hasanapur	786.4	1,120
Chak Maniya	69.3	486
Gautamman Khera	47.2	600
Ramaipur Kalan	243.1	1,579
Dhanpalpur	245.2	2,552
Jhampur	197.7	1,126
Hathnasa	191.5	3,247
Tej Gaon	480.8	4,431
Dariyapur	127.5	655
Chak Gaur	92.2	579
Pasan Khera	48.4	671
Malke Gaon	305.8	2,951
Lakhan Gaon	138.3	1,233
Baruwahar	100	768
Parwat Khera	51.7	437
Odarahar	193.2	414
Dighiya	71	730
Chak Chorhiya	94.3	896
Gajiyapur	35.1	420
Saidapur)	175.3	1,405
Rasi Gaon	239.6	1,727
Chhivlaha	325.5	3,241
Mathurpur Mu.	249	1,393
Mathurpur Aht.	337	1
Dafpura	92.5	516
Rampur Kalan Aht.	167.9	0
Rampur Kalan Mu.	399.5	2,579
Bairuwa Aht.	322.1	0
Bairuwa Mu	330.3	2,138
Sahanipur	161.8	1,372
Firojpur	128.4	505
Helauli	115.6	561
Haibatpur Kalan	180.3	1,424
Rautapur	106	579
Ralpur Aht.	200.9	0
Ralpur Mu.	591.4	4,749
Kanjas	174.9	1,023
Bhita	37.8	524
Deo Khera	208.6	153
Kalhi Gaon	89	1,348
Ram Gaon	68.6	506
Gopali Khera	130.8	610
Sagar Khera	201.6	2,102
Ramaipur Khurd	76.9	638
Sidhaur Tara Aht.	40.6	1
Sidhaur Tara Mu.	411	1,707
Musapur	292	1,944
