= Rasigaon =

Rasigaon Rāsigāon
- Village
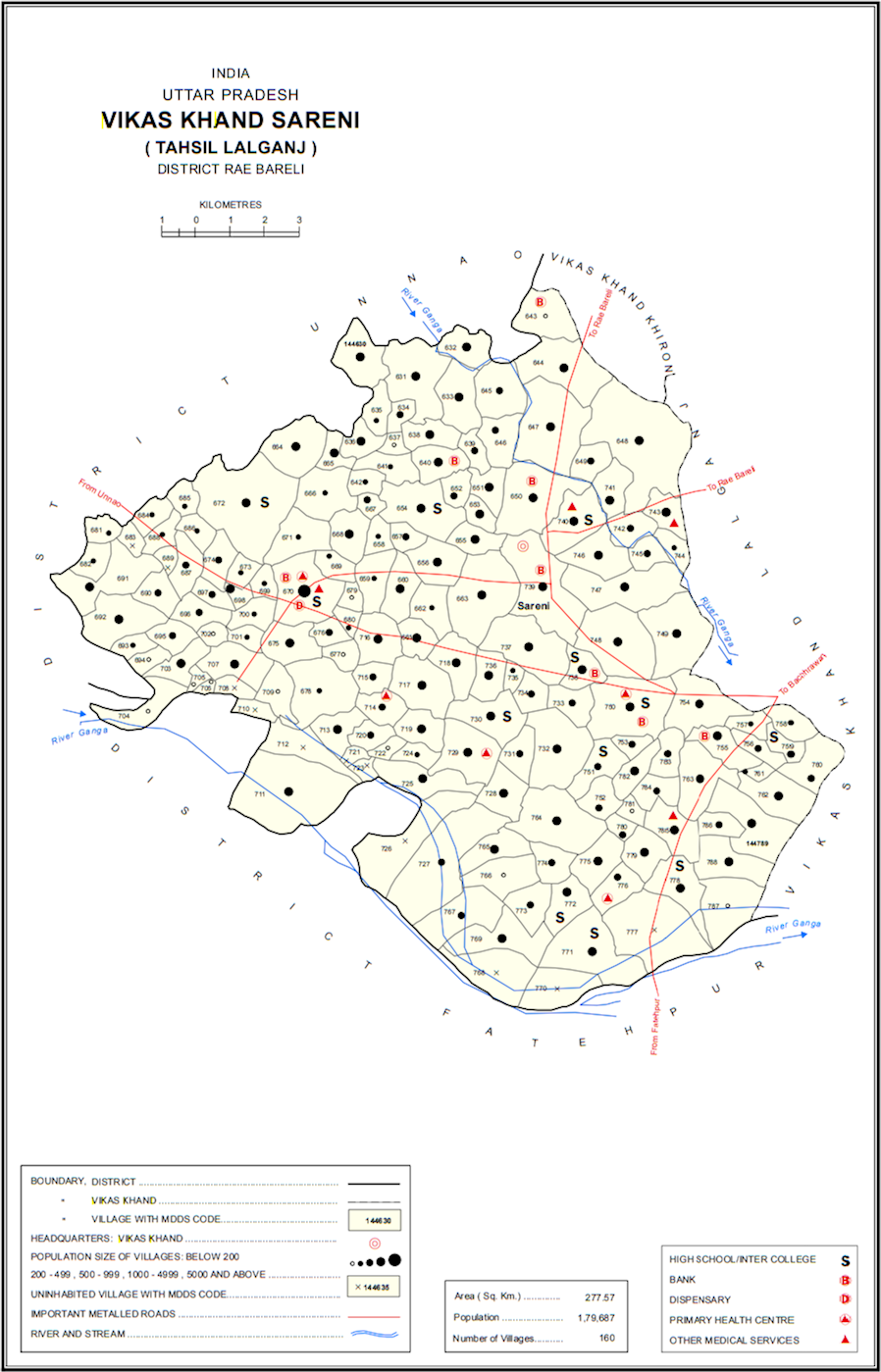
- Map showing Rasigaon (#763) in Sareni CD block

- Location in Uttar Pradesh, India
- Coordinates: 26.100492°N 80.869108°E
- Country: India
- State: Uttar Pradesh
- District: Raebareli

Area
  - Total: 2.396 km^{2} (0.925 sq mi)

Population (2011)
  - Total: 1,727
  - Density: 720.8/km^{2} (1,867/sq mi)

Languages
  - Official: Hindi
- Time zone: UTC+5:30 (IST)
- Vehicle registration: UP-35

Rasigaon is a village in Sareni block of Rae Bareli district, Uttar Pradesh, India. As of 2011, it has a population of 1,727 people, in 340 households. It has one primary school and no healthcare facilities and does not host a weekly haat or a permanent market. It belongs to the nyaya panchayat of Malkegaon.

The 1951 census recorded Rasigaon as comprising 2 hamlets, with a total population of 693 people (320 male and 373 female), in 124 households and 97 physical houses. The area of the village was given as 601 acres. 45 residents were literate, all male. The village was listed as belonging to the pargana of Sareni and the thana of Sareni.

The 1961 census recorded Rasigaon as comprising 2 hamlets, with a total population of 801 people (369 male and 432 female), in 149 households and 124 physical houses. The area of the village was given as 601 acres.

The 1981 census recorded Rasigaon as having a population of 1,007 people, in 171 households, and having an area of 239.59 hectares. The main staple foods were given as wheat and rice.

The 1991 census recorded Rasigaon (as "Rasi Gaon") as having a total population of 1,203 people (580 male and 623 female), in 220 households and 220 physical houses. The area of the village was listed as 240 hectares. Members of the 0-6 age group numbered 213, or 18% of the total; this group was 48% male (102) and 52% female (111). Members of scheduled castes made up 48% of the village's population, while no members of scheduled tribes were recorded. The literacy rate of the village was 37% (298 men and 143 women). 279 people were classified as main workers (267 men and 12 women), while 160 people were classified as marginal workers (1 man and 159 women); the remaining 764 residents were non-workers. The breakdown of main workers by employment category was as follows: 166 cultivators (i.e. people who owned or leased their own land); 81 agricultural labourers (i.e. people who worked someone else's land in return for payment); 2 workers in livestock, forestry, fishing, hunting, plantations, orchards, etc.; 0 in mining and quarrying; 0 household industry workers; 0 workers employed in other manufacturing, processing, service, and repair roles; 0 construction workers; 1 employed in trade and commerce; 1 employed in transport, storage, and communications; and 28 in other services.
