= Rahim Khera =

- Village
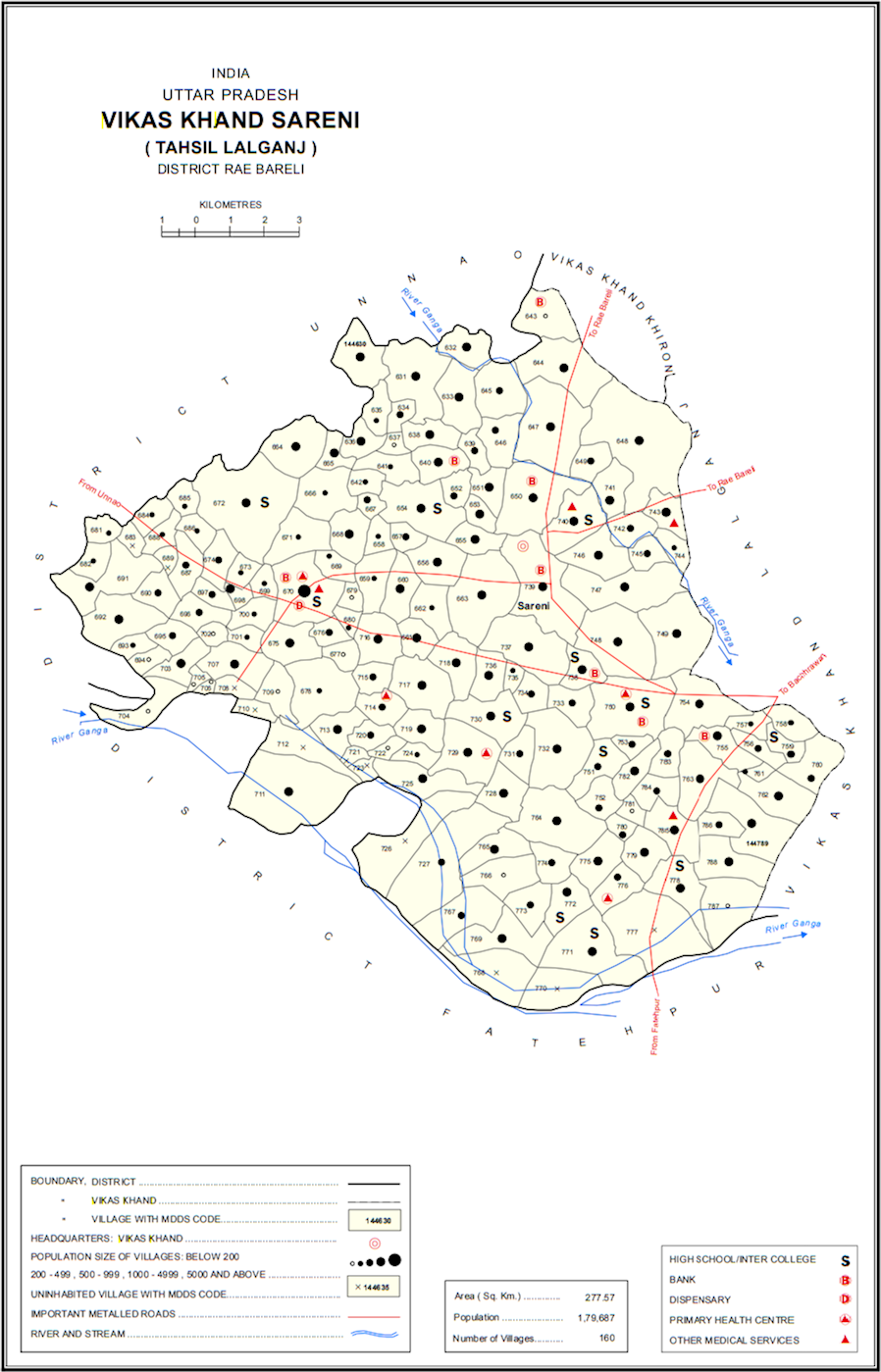
- Map showing Rahim Khera (#642) in Sareni CD block

- Location in Uttar Pradesh, India
- Coordinates: 26.169346°N 80.778388°E
- Country: India
- State: Uttar Pradesh
- District: Raebareli

Area
  - Total: 0.726 km^{2} (0.280 sq mi)

Population (2011)
  - Total: 440
  - Density: 610/km^{2} (1,600/sq mi)

Languages
  - Official: Hindi
- Time zone: UTC+5:30 (IST)
- Vehicle registration: UP-35

Rahim Khera is a village in Sareni block of Rae Bareli district, Uttar Pradesh, India. It is located 19 km from Lalganj, the tehsil headquarters. As of 2011, it has a population of 440 people, in 89 households. It has no schools and no healthcare facilities. It belongs to the nyaya panchayat of Rasulpur.

The 1951 census recorded Rahim Khera as comprising 1 hamlet, with a total population of 225 people (110 male and 115 female), in 44 households and 34 physical houses. The area of the village was given as 183 acres. 78 residents were literate, 34 male and 44 female. The village was listed as belonging to the pargana of Sareni and the thana of Sareni.

The 1961 census recorded Rahim Khera as comprising 1 hamlet, with a total population of 236 people (124 male and 112 female), in 46 households and 37 physical houses. The area of the village was given as 183 acres.

The 1981 census recorded Rahim Khera as having a population of 342 people, in 66 households, and having an area of 74.06 hectares. The main staple foods were given as wheat and rice.

The 1991 census recorded Rahim Khera as having a total population of 415 people (223 male and 192 female), in 68 households and 68 physical houses. The area of the village was listed as 72 hectares. Members of the 0-6 age group numbered 80, or 19% of the total; this group was 51% male (41) and 49% female (39). Members of scheduled castes made up 46% of the village's population, while no members of scheduled tribes were recorded. The literacy rate of the village was 29% (90 men and 30 women). 127 people were classified as main workers (121 men and 6 women), while 0 people were classified as marginal workers; the remaining 288 residents were non-workers. The breakdown of main workers by employment category was as follows: 50 cultivators (i.e. people who owned or leased their own land); 57 agricultural labourers (i.e. people who worked someone else's land in return for payment); 0 workers in livestock, forestry, fishing, hunting, plantations, orchards, etc.; 0 in mining and quarrying; 0 household industry workers; 1 worker employed in other manufacturing, processing, service, and repair roles; 0 construction workers; 13 employed in trade and commerce; 1 employed in transport, storage, and communications; and 5 in other services.
