= Deopur, Sareni =

Deopur
- Village
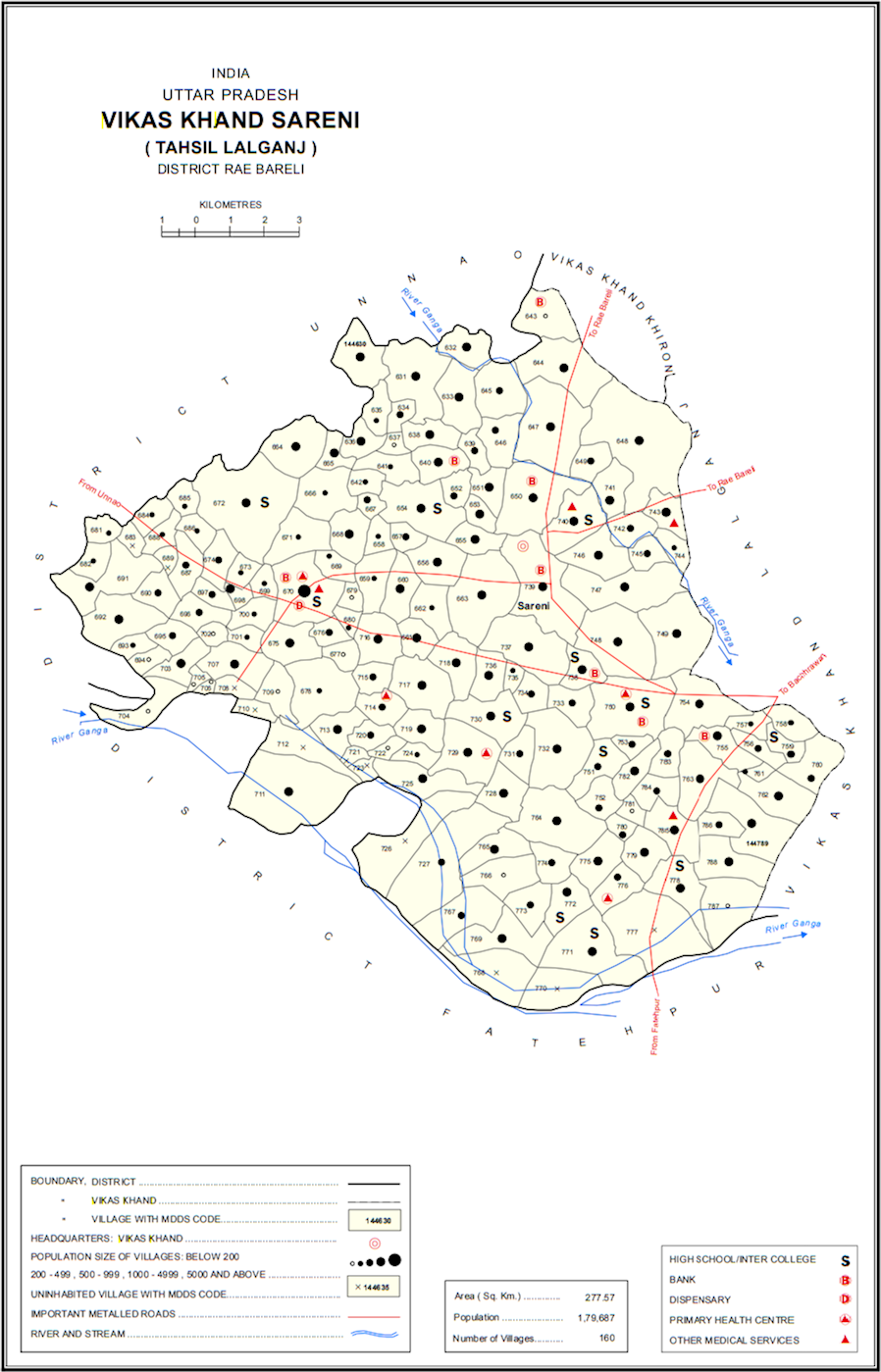
- Map showing Deopur (#632) in Sareni CD block

- Location in Uttar Pradesh, India
- Coordinates: 26.204862°N 80.801691°E
- Country: India
- State: Uttar Pradesh
- District: Raebareli

Area
  - Total: 1.44 km^{2} (0.56 sq mi)

Population (2011)
  - Total: 1,737
  - Density: 1,210/km^{2} (3,120/sq mi)

Languages
  - Official: Hindi
- Time zone: UTC+5:30 (IST)
- Vehicle registration: UP-35

Deopur is a village in Sareni block of Rae Bareli district, Uttar Pradesh, India. It is located 21 km from Lalganj, the tehsil headquarters. As of 2011, it has a population of 1,737 people, in 302 households. It has one primary school and no healthcare facilities. It belongs to the nyaya panchayat of Rasulpur.

The 1951 census recorded Deopur as comprising 6 hamlets, with a total population of 741 people (370 male and 371 female), in 131 households and 112 physical houses. The area of the village was given as 356 acres. 38 residents were literate, 37 male and 1 female. The village was listed as belonging to the pargana of Sareni and the thana of Sareni.

The 1961 census recorded Deopur as comprising 4 hamlets, with a total population of 830 people (410 male and 420 female), in 148 households and 121 physical houses. The area of the village was given as 356 acres.

The 1981 census recorded Deopur as having a population of 1,085 people, in 189 households, and having an area of 145.96 hectares. The main staple foods were given as wheat and rice.

The 1991 census recorded Deopur as having a total population of 1,166 people (570 male and 596 female), in 197 households and 197 physical houses. The area of the village was listed as 144 hectares. Members of the 0-6 age group numbered 234, or 20% of the total; this group was 48% male (112) and 52% female (122). Members of scheduled castes made up 28% of the village's population, while no members of scheduled tribes were recorded. The literacy rate of the village was 34% (283 men and 109 women). 236 people were classified as main workers (230 men and 6 women), while 7 people were classified as marginal workers (5 men and 2 women); the remaining 923 residents were non-workers. The breakdown of main workers by employment category was as follows: 211 cultivators (i.e. people who owned or leased their own land); 5 agricultural labourers (i.e. people who worked someone else's land in return for payment); 1 worker in livestock, forestry, fishing, hunting, plantations, orchards, etc.; 0 in mining and quarrying; 0 household industry workers; 3 workers employed in other manufacturing, processing, service, and repair roles; 1 construction worker; 4 employed in trade and commerce; 1 employed in transport, storage, and communications; and 10 in other services.
