= Pahuri =

- Village
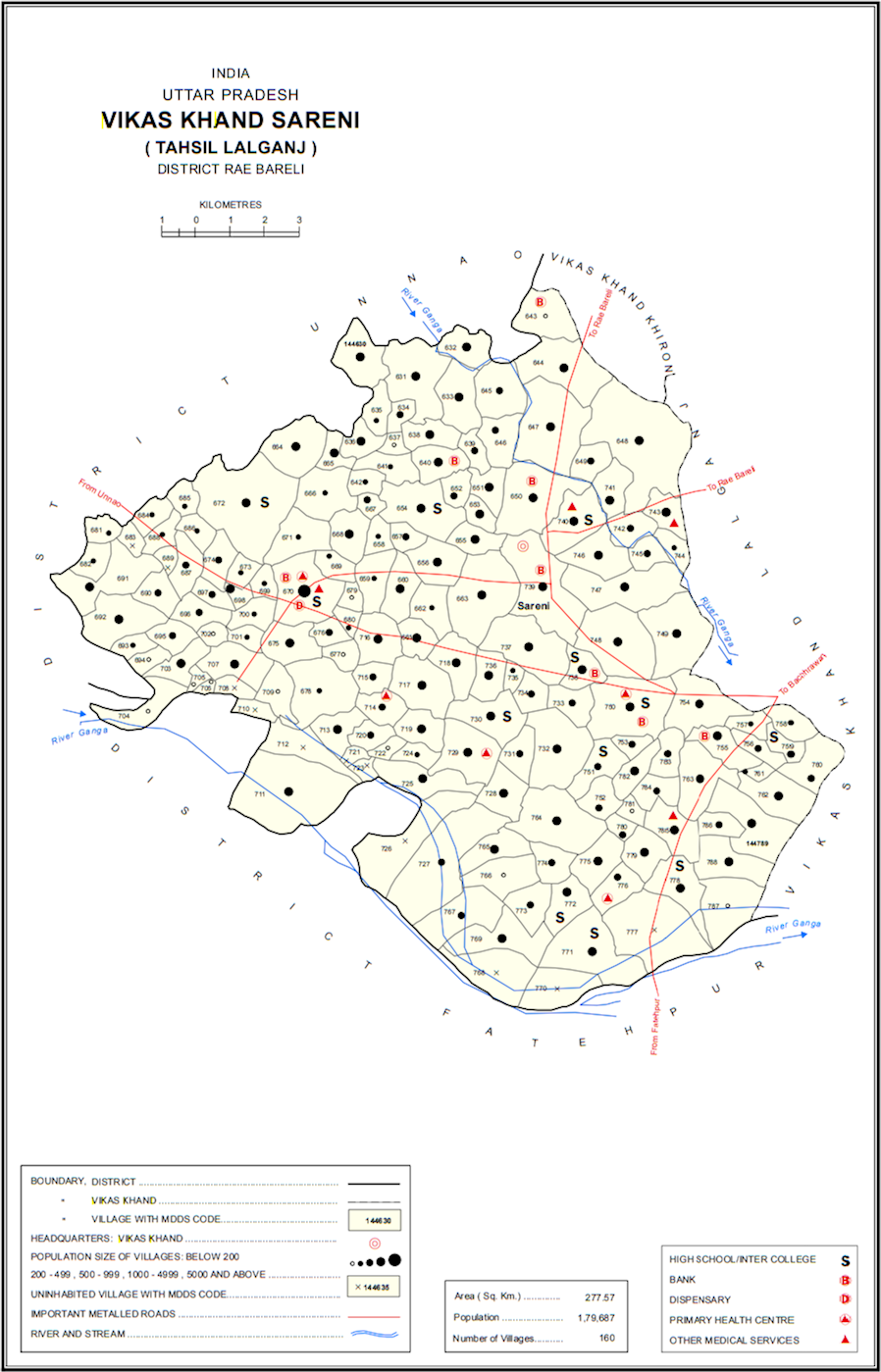
- Map showing Pahuri (#648) in Sareni CD block

- Location in Uttar Pradesh, India
- Coordinates: 26.182658°N 80.860823°E
- Country: India
- State: Uttar Pradesh
- District: Raebareli

Area
  - Total: 5.88 km^{2} (2.27 sq mi)

Population (2011)
  - Total: 4,190
  - Density: 713/km^{2} (1,850/sq mi)

Languages
  - Official: Hindi
- Time zone: UTC+5:30 (IST)
- Vehicle registration: UP-33

Pahuri is a village in Sareni block of Rae Bareli district, Uttar Pradesh, India. It is located 11 km from Lalganj, the tehsil headquarters. As of 2011, it has a population of 1,122 people, in 196 households. It hosts both a regular market and a weekly haat. It belongs to the nyaya panchayat of Bhoremau.

The 1951 census recorded Pahuri as comprising 21 hamlets, with a total population of 2,032 people (1,026 male and 1,006 female), in 350 households and 311 physical houses. The area of the village was given as 1,398 acres. 138 residents were literate, 133 male and 5 female. The village was listed as belonging to the pargana of Sareni and the thana of Sareni.

The 1961 census recorded Pahuri as comprising 17 hamlets, with a total population of 2,273 people (1,184 male and 1,089 female), in 366 households and 353 physical houses. The area of the village was given as 1,398 acres and it had a post office at that point. It was then part of Lalganj block.

The 1981 census recorded Pahuri as having a population of 2,927 people, in 469 households, and having an area of 565.76 hectares. The main staple foods were given as wheat and rice.

The 1991 census recorded Pahuri as having a total population of 3,444 people (1,748 male and 1,696 female), in 568 households and 567 physical houses. The area of the village was listed as 586 hectares. Members of the 0-6 age group numbered 563, or 16% of the total; this group was 54% male (303) and 46% female (260). Members of scheduled castes made up 22% of the village's population, while no members of scheduled tribes were recorded. The literacy rate of the village was 39% (904 men and 433 women). 1,071 people were classified as main workers (766 men and 305 women), while 32 people were classified as marginal workers (11 men and 21 women); the remaining 2,341 residents were non-workers. The breakdown of main workers by employment category was as follows: 581 cultivators (i.e. people who owned or leased their own land); 332 agricultural labourers (i.e. people who worked someone else's land in return for payment); 11 workers in livestock, forestry, fishing, hunting, plantations, orchards, etc.; 0 in mining and quarrying; 20 household industry workers; 40 workers employed in other manufacturing, processing, service, and repair roles; 0 construction workers; 20 employed in trade and commerce; 6 employed in transport, storage, and communications; and 61 in other services.
