= Gopali Khera =

Gopali Khera Gopāli Khera
- Village
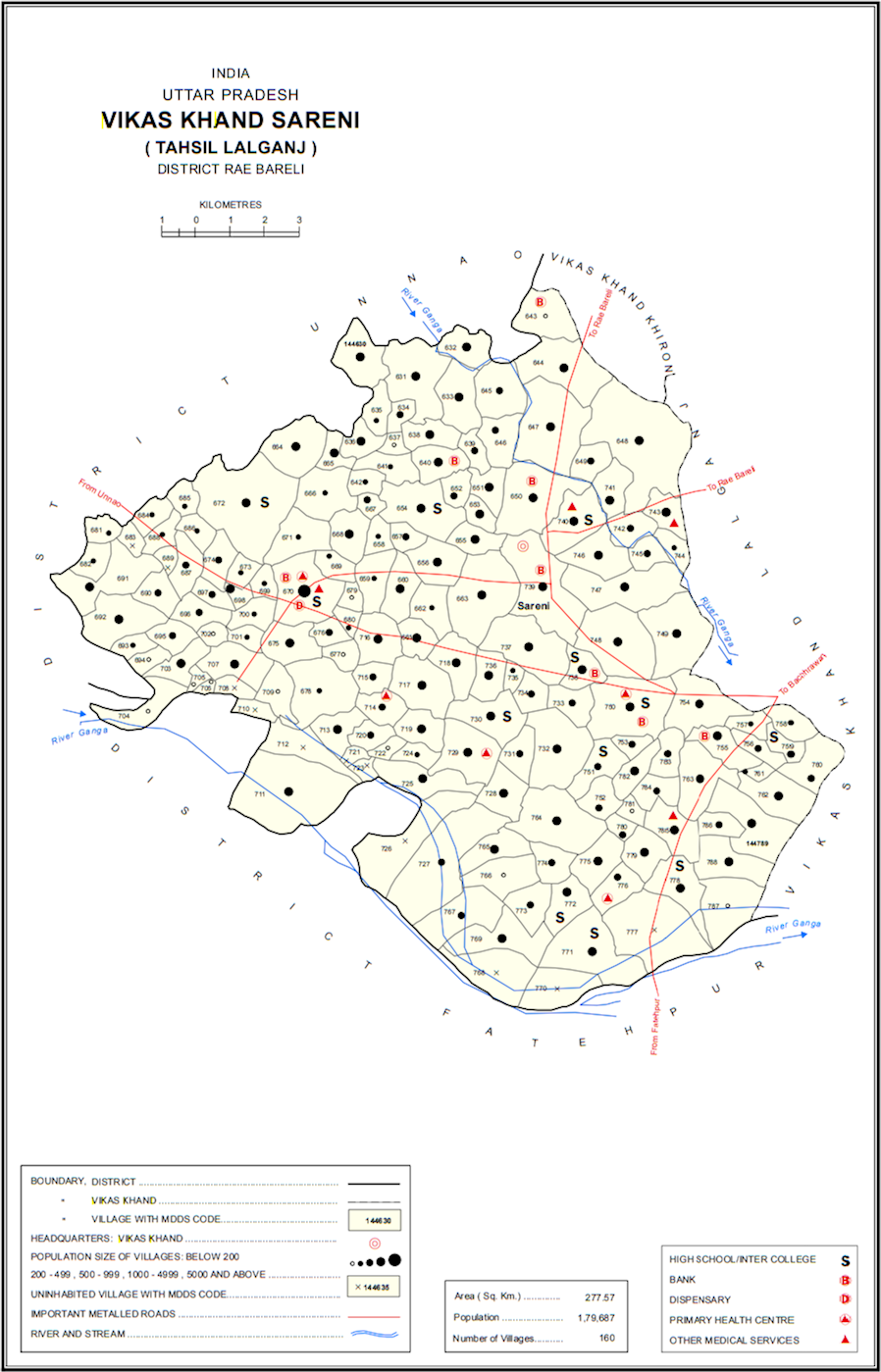
- Map showing Gopali Khera (#784) in Sareni CD block

- Location in Uttar Pradesh, India
- Coordinates: 26.089162°N 80.852735°E
- Country: India
- State: Uttar Pradesh
- District: Raebareli

Area
  - Total: 1.038 km^{2} (0.401 sq mi)

Population (2011)
  - Total: 610
  - Density: 590/km^{2} (1,500/sq mi)

Languages
  - Official: Hindi
- Time zone: UTC+5:30 (IST)
- Vehicle registration: UP-35

Gopali Khera is a village in Sareni block of Rae Bareli district, Uttar Pradesh, India. It is located 14 km from Lalganj, the tehsil headquarters. As of 2011, it has a population of 610 people, in 123 households. It has no healthcare facilities and does not host a weekly haat or a permanent market. It belongs to the nyaya panchayat of Sagar Khera.

The 1951 census recorded Gopali Khera as comprising 5 hamlets, with a total population of 330 people (158 male and 172 female), in 65 households and 51 physical houses. The area of the village was given as 290 acres. 44 residents were literate, all male. The village was listed as belonging to the pargana of Sareni and the thana of Sareni.

The 1961 census recorded Gopali Khera as comprising 1 hamlet, with a total population of 380 people (172 male and 208 female), in 76 households and 56 physical houses. The area of the village was given as 290 acres.

The 1981 census recorded Gopali Khera as having a population of 522 people, in 75 households, and having an area of 103.60 hectares. The main staple foods were given as wheat and rice.

The 1991 census recorded Gopali Khera as having a total population of 536 people (272 male and 264 female), in 95 households and 95 physical houses. The area of the village was listed as 104 hectares. Members of the 0-6 age group numbered 81, or 15% of the total; this group was 44% male (36) and 56% female (45). Members of scheduled castes made up 15% of the village's population, while no members of scheduled tribes were recorded. The literacy rate of the village was 52% (180 men and 101 women). 106 people were classified as main workers (98 men and 8 women), while 0 people were classified as marginal workers; the remaining 430 residents were non-workers. The breakdown of main workers by employment category was as follows: 72 cultivators (i.e. people who owned or leased their own land); 15 agricultural labourers (i.e. people who worked someone else's land in return for payment); 0 workers in livestock, forestry, fishing, hunting, plantations, orchards, etc.; 0 in mining and quarrying; 0 household industry workers; 0 workers employed in other manufacturing, processing, service, and repair roles; 2 construction workers; 3 employed in trade and commerce; 2 employed in transport, storage, and communications; and 12 in other services.
