= Ram Khera =

Ram Khera Rām Khera
- Village
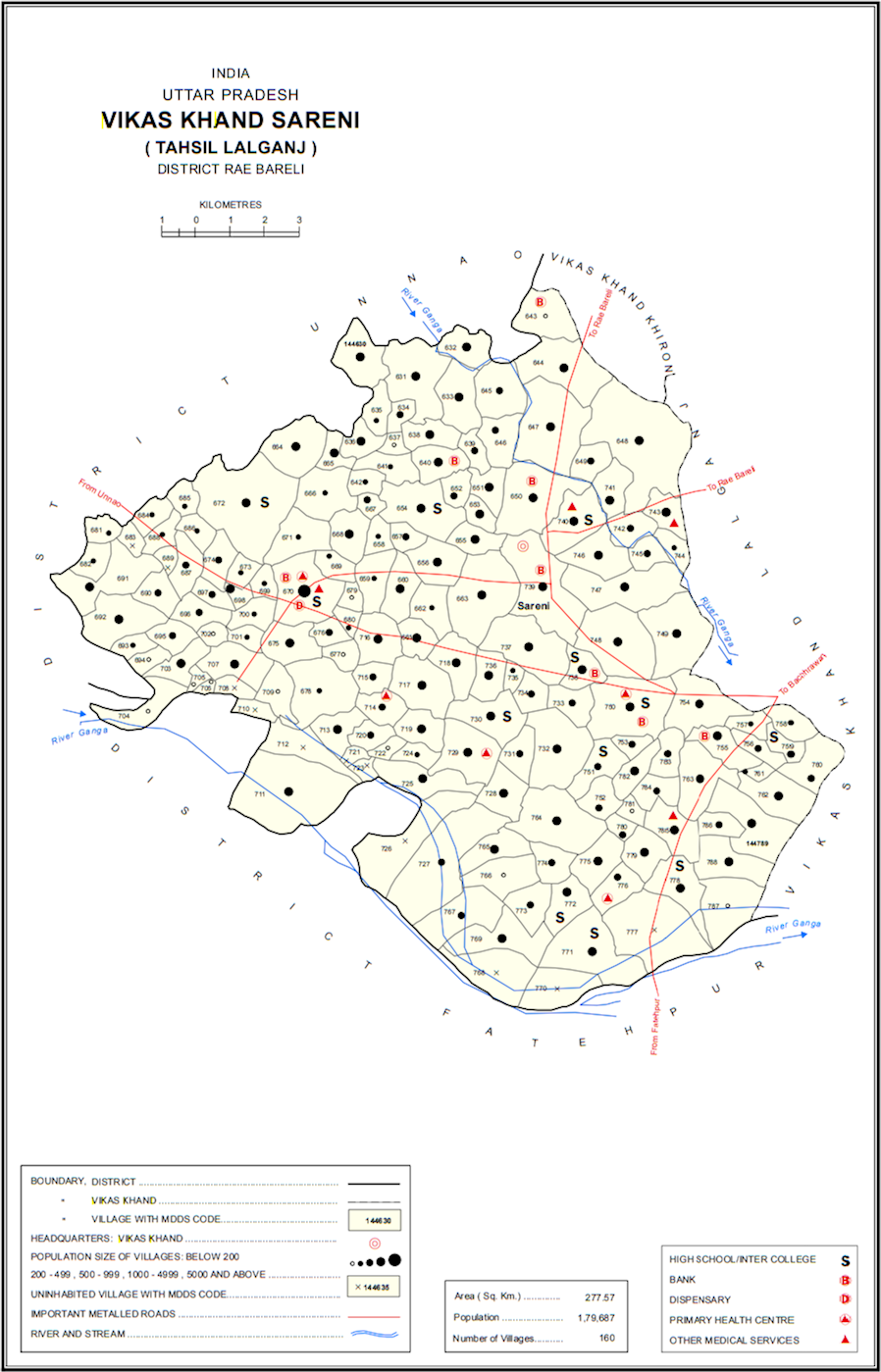
- Map showing Ram Khera (#639) in Sareni CD block

- Location in Uttar Pradesh, India
- Coordinates: 26.177974°N 80.808152°E
- Country: India
- State: Uttar Pradesh
- District: Raebareli

Area
  - Total: 1.008 km^{2} (0.389 sq mi)

Population (2011)
  - Total: 896
  - Density: 889/km^{2} (2,300/sq mi)

Languages
  - Official: Hindi
- Time zone: UTC+5:30 (IST)
- Vehicle registration: UP-35

Ram Khera is a village in the Sareni block of Rae Bareli district, Uttar Pradesh, India. It is located 20 km from Lalganj, the tehsil headquarters. As of 2011, it has a population of 896 in 170 households. It has two primary schools and no healthcare facilities. It belongs to the nyaya panchayat of Rasulpur.

The 1951 census recorded Ram Khera comprising 3 hamlets, with a total population of 387 (213 male and 174 female), in 80 households and 71 physical houses. The village area was given as 250 acres. 16 residents were literate, 15 male and 1 female. The village was listed as belonging to the pargana of Sareni and the thana of Sareni.

The 1961 census recorded Ram Khera comprising 2 hamlets, with a total population of 459 (236 male and 223 female), in 83 households and 78 physical houses. The village area was given as 250 acres.

The 1981 census recorded Ram Khera as having a population of 483, in 95 households, and having an area of 102.50 hectares. The main staple foods were wheat and rice.

The 1991 census recorded Ram Khera as having a total population of 666 people (329 male and 337 female), in 118 households and 118 physical houses. The village area was listed as 99 hectares. Members of the 0-6 age group numbered 132, or 20% of the total; this group was 52% male (69) and 48% female (63). Members of scheduled castes comprised 25% of the village's population, while no members of scheduled tribes were recorded. The literacy rate of the village was 29% (146 men and 52 women). 237 people were classified as main workers (148 men and 89 women), while 0 people were classified as marginal workers; the remaining 564 residents were non-workers. The breakdown of main workers by employment category was as follows: 66 cultivators (i.e. people who owned or leased their land); 144 agricultural labourers (i.e. people who worked someone else's land in return for payment); 2 workers in livestock, forestry, fishing, hunting, plantations, orchards, etc.; 1 in mining and quarrying; 2 household industry workers; 7 workers employed in other manufacturing, processing, service, and repair roles; 1 construction worker; 1 employed in trade and commerce; 1 employed in transport, storage, and communications; and 12 in other services.
