= Madai Khera =

- Village
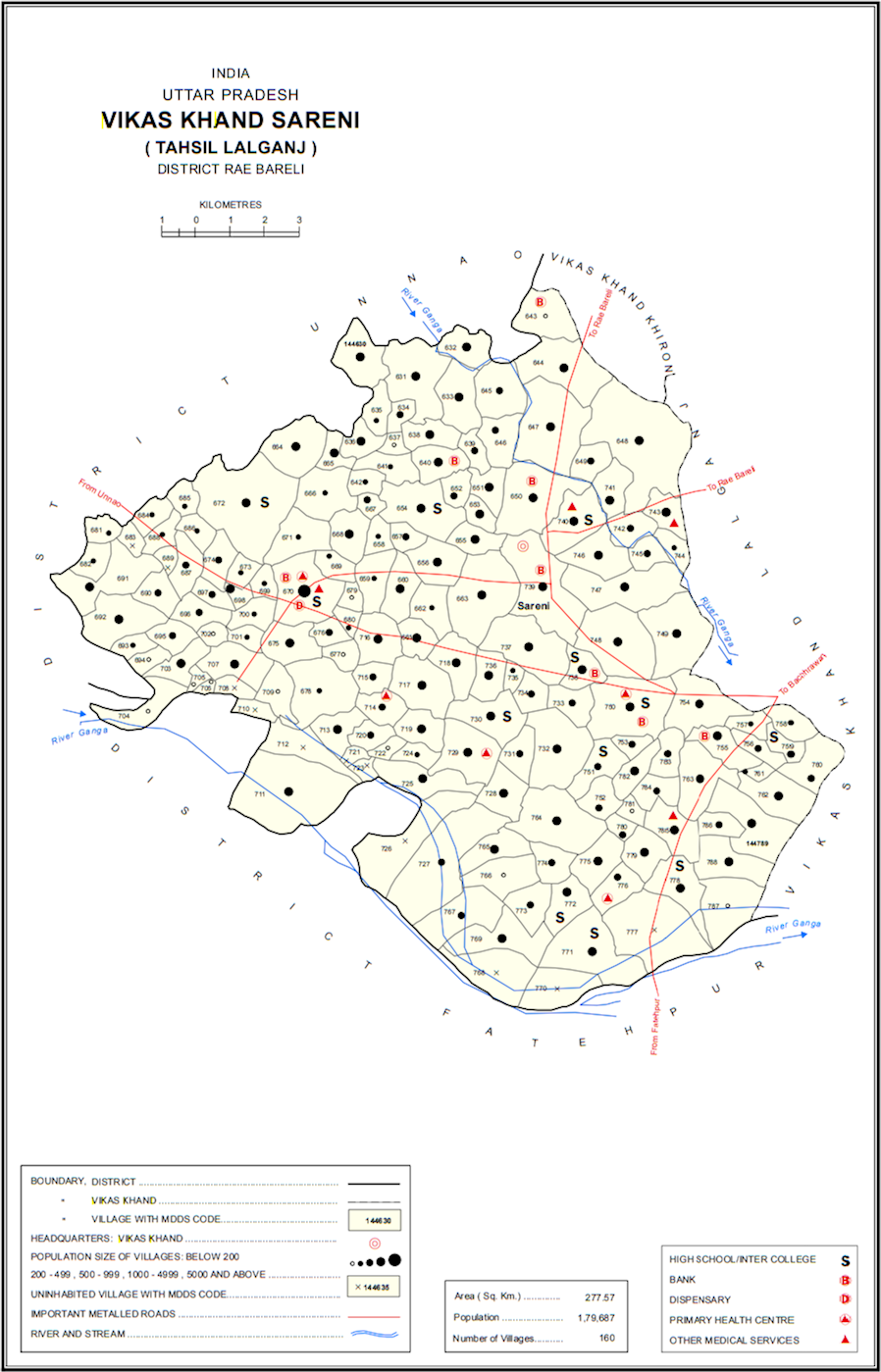
- Map showing Madai Khera (#741) in Sareni CD block

- Location in Uttar Pradesh, India
- Coordinates: 26.169842°N 80.844301°E
- Country: India
- State: Uttar Pradesh
- District: Raebareli

Area
  - Total: 1.85 km^{2} (0.71 sq mi)

Population (2011)
  - Total: 1,322
  - Density: 715/km^{2} (1,850/sq mi)

Languages
  - Official: Hindi
- Time zone: UTC+5:30 (IST)
- Vehicle registration: UP-35

Madai Khera is a village in Sareni block of Rae Bareli district, Uttar Pradesh, India. It is located 14 km from Lalganj, the tehsil headquarters. As of 2011, it has a population of 1,322 people, in 269 households. It does hosts a permanent market as well as a weekly haat. It belongs to the nyaya panchayat of Sareni.

The 1951 census recorded Madai Khera as comprising 5 hamlets, with a total population of 546 people (290 male and 256 female), in 99 households and 83 physical houses. The area of the village was given as 471 acres. 80 residents were literate, 72 male and 8 female. The village was listed as belonging to the pargana of Sareni and the thana of Sareni.

The 1961 census recorded Madai Khera as comprising 4 hamlets, with a total population of 682 people (322 male and 360 female), in 112 households and 96 physical houses. The area of the village was given as 469 acres.

The 1981 census recorded Madai Khera as having a population of 876 people, in 141 households, and having an area of 186.96 hectares. The main staple foods were given as wheat and rice.

The 1991 census recorded Madai Khera as having a total population of 929 people (462 male and 467 female), in 171 households and 171 physical houses. The area of the village was listed as 188 hectares. Members of the 0-6 age group numbered 144, or 15.5% of the total; this group was 52% male (75) and 48% female (69). Members of scheduled castes made up 16% of the village's population, while no members of scheduled tribes were recorded. The literacy rate of the village was 45% (263 men and 151 women). 277 people were classified as main workers (238 men and 39 women), while 0 people were classified as marginal workers; the remaining 652 residents were non-workers. The breakdown of main workers by employment category was as follows: 176 cultivators (i.e. people who owned or leased their own land); 86 agricultural labourers (i.e. people who worked someone else's land in return for payment); 0 workers in livestock, forestry, fishing, hunting, plantations, orchards, etc.; 0 in mining and quarrying; 0 household industry workers; 0 workers employed in other manufacturing, processing, service, and repair roles; 0 construction workers; 0 employed in trade and commerce; 4 employed in transport, storage, and communications; and 11 in other services.
