= Ramaipur Kalan =

Ramaipur Kalan Ramaipur Kalān
- Village
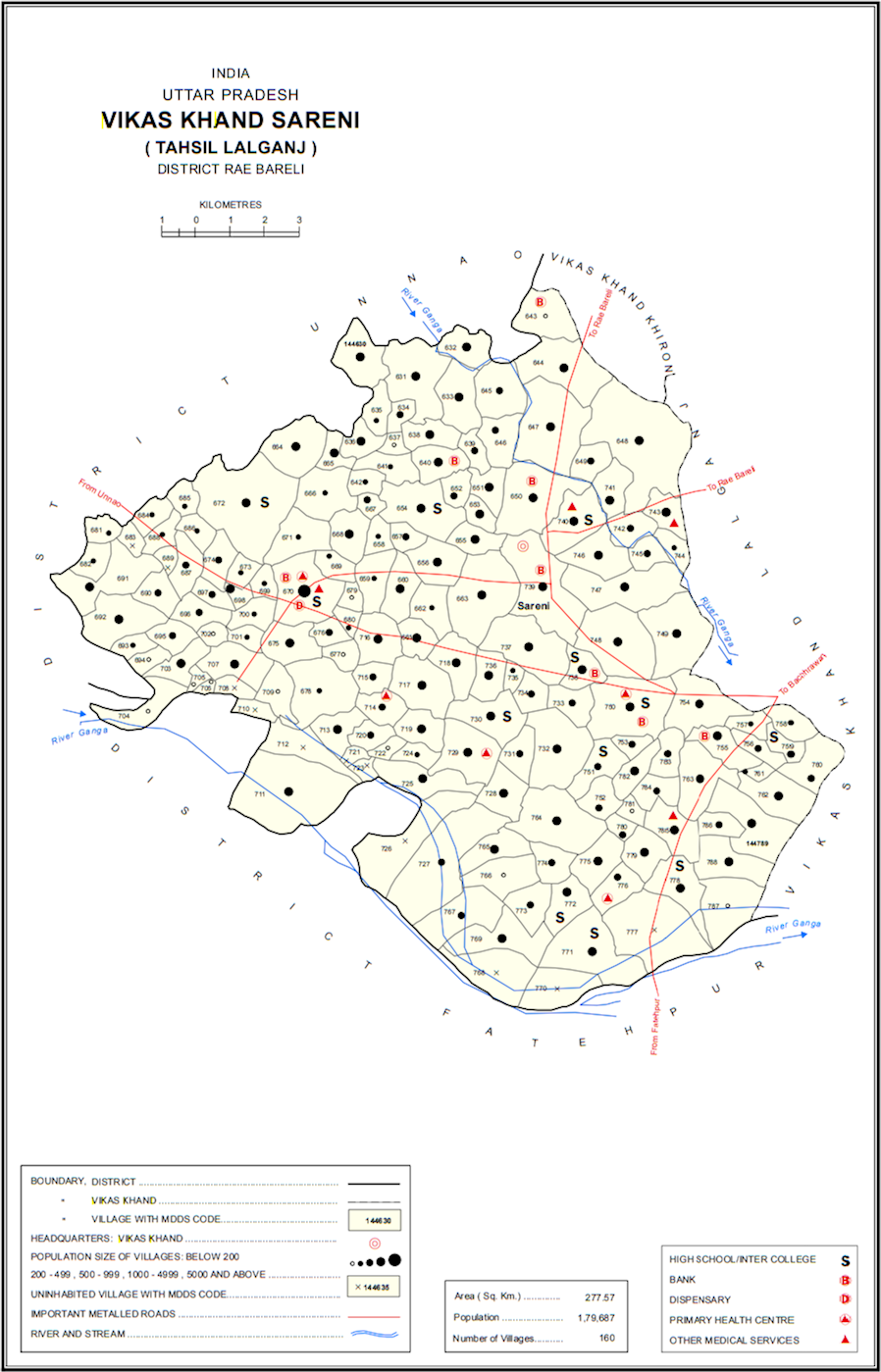
- Map showing Ramaipur Kalan (#746) in Sareni CD block

- Location in Uttar Pradesh, India
- Coordinates: 26.150563°N 80.838248°E
- Country: India
- State: Uttar Pradesh
- District: Raebareli

Area
  - Total: 2.431 km^{2} (0.939 sq mi)

Population (2011)
  - Total: 1,579
  - Density: 649.5/km^{2} (1,682/sq mi)

Languages
  - Official: Hindi
- Time zone: UTC+5:30 (IST)
- Vehicle registration: UP-35

Ramaipur Kalan is a village in Sareni block of Rae Bareli district, Uttar Pradesh, India. It is located 15 km from Lalganj, the tehsil headquarters. As of 2011, it has a population of 1,579 people, in 251 households. It has one primary school and no healthcare facilities, and does not host a weekly haat or a permanent market. It belongs to the nyaya panchayat of Sareni.

The 1951 census recorded Ramaipur Kalan as comprising 4 hamlets, with a total population of 521 people (279 male and 242 female), in 96 households and 83 physical houses. The area of the village was given as 569 acres. 31 residents were literate, all male. The village was listed as belonging to the pargana of Sareni and the thana of Sareni.

The 1961 census recorded Ramaipur Kalan as comprising 1 hamlet, with a total population of 582 people (300 male and 282 female), in 108 households and 85 physical houses. The area of the village was given as 568 acres.

The 1981 census recorded Ramaipur Kalan as having a population of 987 people, in 130 households, and having an area of 226.62 hectares. The main staple foods were given as wheat and rice.

The 1991 census recorded Ramaipur Kalan as having a total population of 976 people (493 male and 483 female), in 159 households and 159 physical houses. The area of the village was listed as 227 hectares. Members of the 0-6 age group numbered 184, or 19% of the total; this group was 55% male (101) and 45% female (83). Members of scheduled castes made up 15% of the village's population, while no members of scheduled tribes were recorded. The literacy rate of the village was 41% (272 men and 129 women). 232 people were classified as main workers (231 men and 1 woman), while 33 people were classified as marginal workers (3 men and 30 women); the remaining 711 residents were non-workers. The breakdown of main workers by employment category was as follows: 157 cultivators (i.e. people who owned or leased their own land); 56 agricultural labourers (i.e. people who worked someone else's land in return for payment); 0 workers in livestock, forestry, fishing, hunting, plantations, orchards, etc.; 1 in mining and quarrying; 0 household industry worker; 1 worker employed in other manufacturing, processing, service, and repair roles; 0 construction workers; 3 employed in trade and commerce; 3 employed in transport, storage, and communications; and 11 in other services.
