= Lakhangaon, Raebareli =

Lakhangaon Lakhangāon
- Village
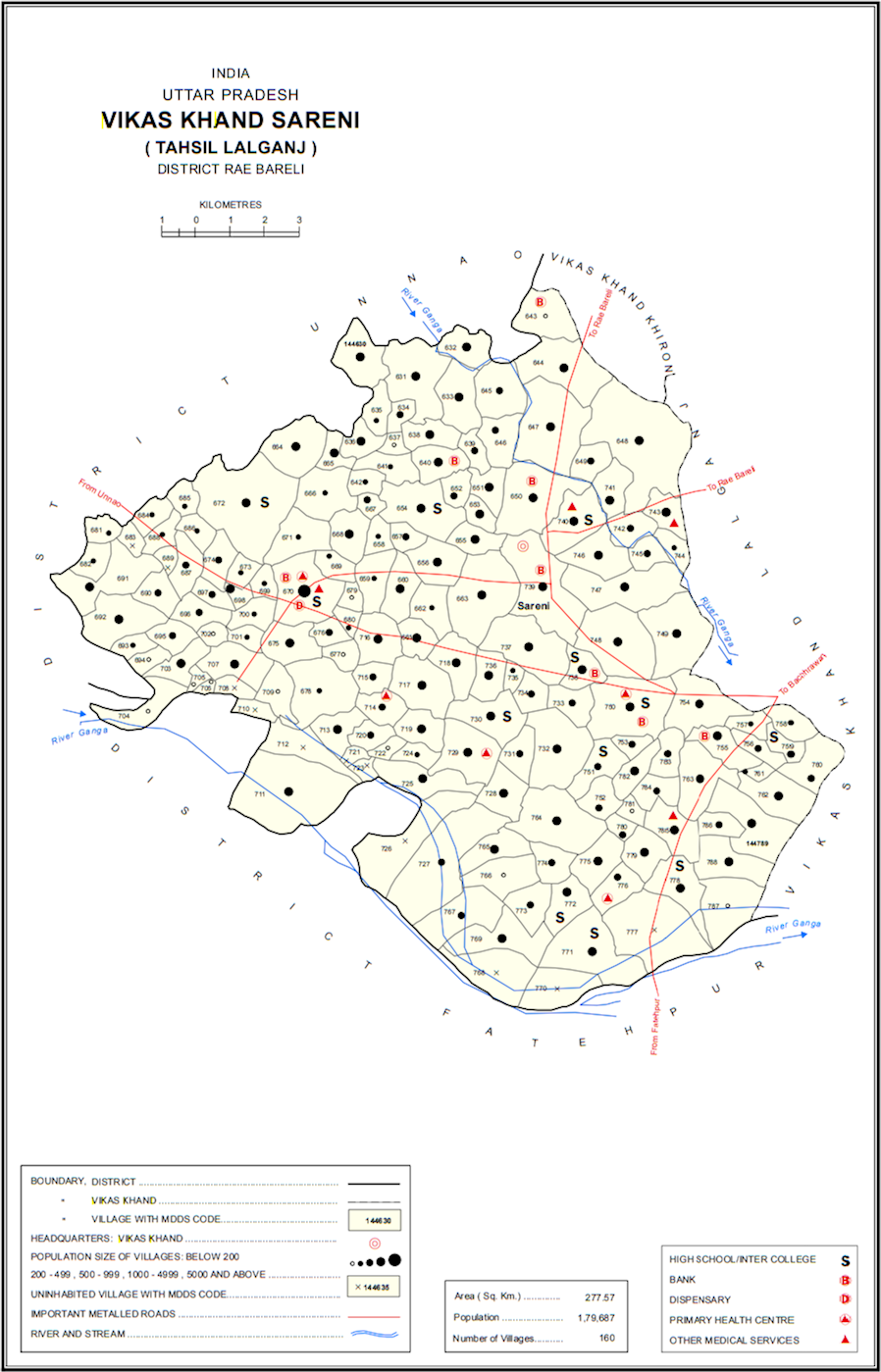
- Map showing Lakhangaon (#755) in Sareni CD block

- Location in Uttar Pradesh, India
- Coordinates: 26.107256°N 80.875652°E
- Country: India
- State: Uttar Pradesh
- District: Raebareli

Area
  - Total: 1.383 km^{2} (0.534 sq mi)

Population (2011)
  - Total: 1,233
  - Density: 891.5/km^{2} (2,309/sq mi)

Languages
  - Official: Hindi
- Time zone: UTC+5:30 (IST)
- Vehicle registration: UP-35

Lakhangaon is a village in Sareni block of Rae Bareli district, Uttar Pradesh, India. As of 2011, it has a population of 1,233 people, in 210 households. It has no healthcare facilities and hosts both a weekly haat and a permanent market. It belongs to the nyaya panchayat of Malkegaon.

The 1951 census recorded Lakhangaon (as "Lakhan Gaon") as comprising 2 hamlets, with a total population of 490 people (230 male and 260 female), in 88 households and 71 physical houses. The area of the village was given as 323 acres. 63 residents were literate, 53 male and 10 female. The village was listed as belonging to the pargana of Sareni and the thana of Sareni.

The 1961 census recorded Lakhangaon as comprising 3 hamlets, with a total population of 486 people (219 male and 267 female), in 94 households and 74 physical houses. The area of the village was given as 323 acres.

The 1981 census recorded Lakhangaon as having a population of 687 people, in 126 households, and having an area of 138.41 hectares. The main staple foods were given as wheat and rice.

The 1991 census recorded Lakhangaon (as "Lakhan Gaon") as having a total population of 658 people (341 male and 317 female), in 155 households and 155 physical houses. The area of the village was listed as 139 hectares. Members of the 0-6 age group numbered 94, or 14% of the total; this group was 53% male (50) and 47% female (44). Members of scheduled castes made up 27% of the village's population, while no members of scheduled tribes were recorded. The literacy rate of the village was 19% (103 men and 23 women). 173 people were classified as main workers (171 men and 2 women), while 64 people were classified as marginal workers (2 men and 62 women); the remaining 421 residents were non-workers. The breakdown of main workers by employment category was as follows: 112 cultivators (i.e. people who owned or leased their own land); 39 agricultural labourers (i.e. people who worked someone else's land in return for payment); 0 workers in livestock, forestry, fishing, hunting, plantations, orchards, etc.; 0 in mining and quarrying; 6 household industry workers; 1 worker employed in other manufacturing, processing, service, and repair roles; 0 construction workers; 3 employed in trade and commerce; 0 employed in transport, storage, and communications; and 12 in other services.
