= Kanjas =

Kanjas Kanjās
- Village
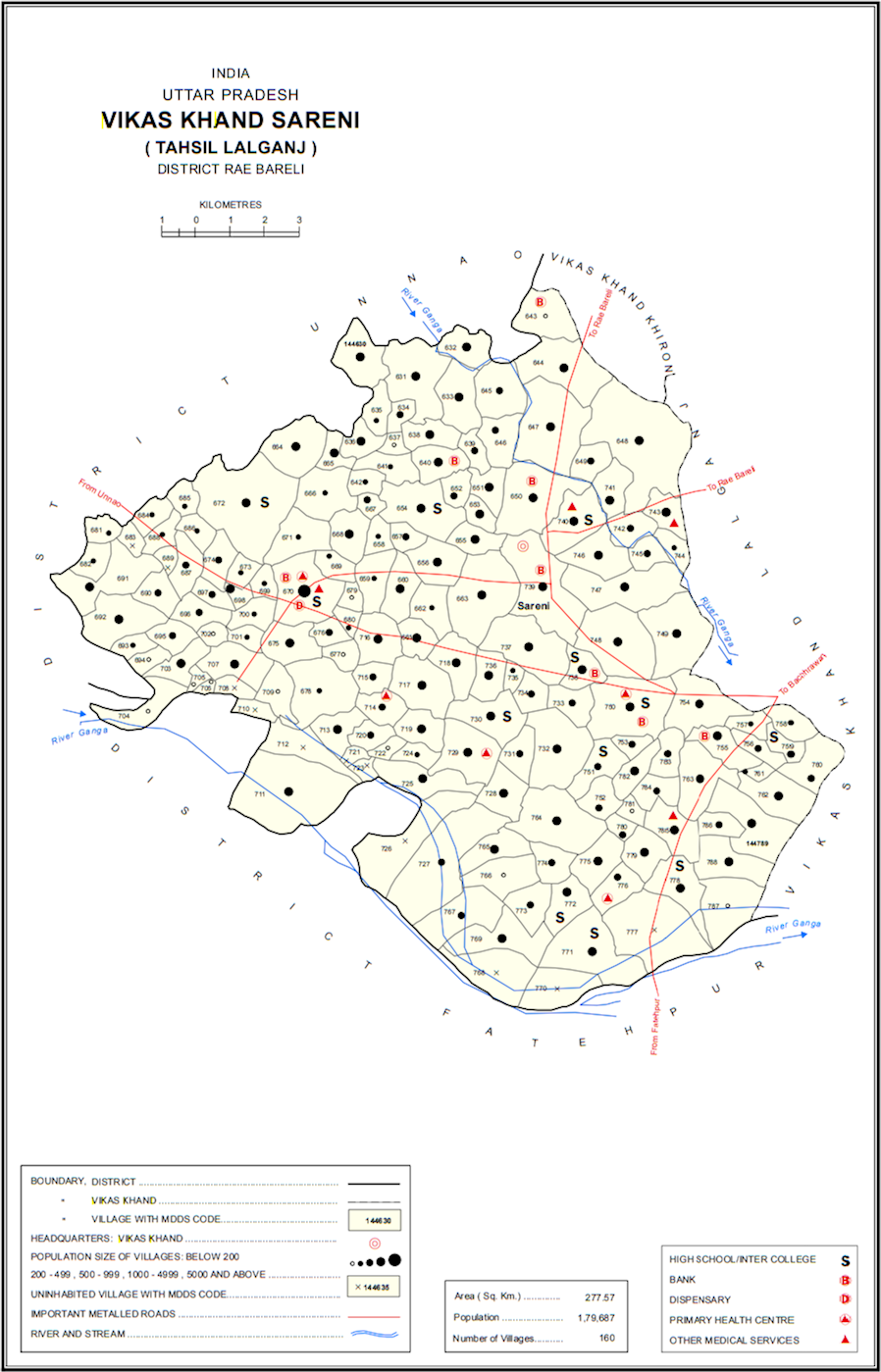
- Map showing Kanjas (#779) in Sareni CD block

- Location in Uttar Pradesh, India
- Coordinates: 26.074783°N 80.856328°E
- Country: India
- State: Uttar Pradesh
- District: Raebareli

Area
  - Total: 1.749 km^{2} (0.675 sq mi)

Population (2011)
  - Total: 1,023
  - Density: 584.9/km^{2} (1,515/sq mi)

Languages
  - Official: Hindi
- Time zone: UTC+5:30 (IST)
- Vehicle registration: UP-35

Kanjas is a village in Sareni block of Rae Bareli district, Uttar Pradesh, India. It is located 17 km from Lalganj, the tehsil headquarters. As of 2011, it has a population of 1,023 people, in 174 households. It has one primary school and no healthcare facilities. It belongs to the nyaya panchayat of Sagar Khera.

The 1951 census recorded Kanjas as comprising 5 hamlets, with a total population of 370 people (189 male and 181 female), in 64 households and 60 physical houses. The area of the village was given as 366 acres. 25 residents were literate, 19 male and 6 female. The village was listed as belonging to the pargana of Sareni and the thana of Sareni.

The 1961 census recorded Kanjas as comprising 4 hamlets, with a total population of 435 people (216 male and 219 female), in 87 households and 75 physical houses. The area of the village was given as 367 acres.

The 1981 census recorded Kanjas as having a population of 353 people, in 121 households, and having an area of 174.82 hectares. The main staple foods were given as wheat and rice.

The 1991 census recorded Kanjas as having a total population of 669 people (327 male and 342 female), in 130 households and 130 physical houses. The area of the village was listed as 175 hectares. Members of the 0-6 age group numbered 95, or 14% of the total; this group was 42% male (40) and 58% female (55). Members of scheduled castes made up 62% of the village's population, while no members of scheduled tribes were recorded. The literacy rate of the village was 28% (130 men and 58 women). 251 people were classified as main workers (136 men and 125 women), while 0 people were classified as marginal workers; the remaining 408 residents were non-workers. The breakdown of main workers by employment category was as follows: 101 cultivators (i.e. people who owned or leased their own land); 154 agricultural labourers (i.e. people who worked someone else's land in return for payment); 0 workers in livestock, forestry, fishing, hunting, plantations, orchards, etc.; 0 in mining and quarrying; 0 household industry workers; 0 workers employed in other manufacturing, processing, service, and repair roles; 0 construction workers; 0 employed in trade and commerce; 0 employed in transport, storage, and communications; and 6 in other services.
