= Lakhai Khera =

- Village
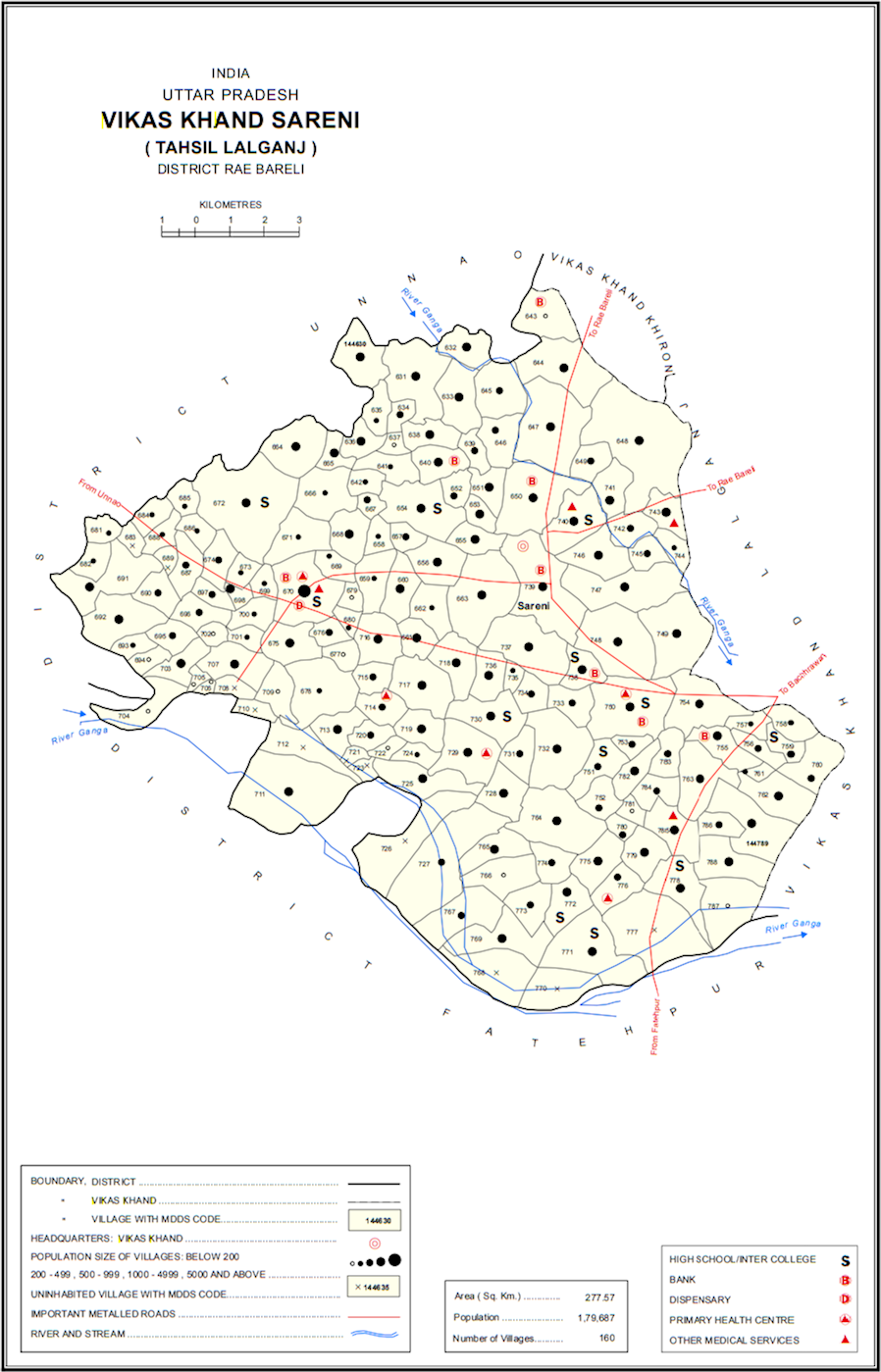
- Map showing Lakhai Khera (#635) in Sareni CD block

- Location in Uttar Pradesh, India
- Coordinates: 26.188121°N 80.776734°E
- Country India: India
- State: Uttar Pradesh
- District: Raebareli

Area
  - Total: 1.062 km^{2} (0.410 sq mi)

Population (2011)
  - Total: 327
  - Density: 308/km^{2} (797/sq mi)

Languages
  - Official: Hindi
- Time zone: UTC+5:30 (IST)
- Vehicle registration: UP-35

Lakhai Khera is a village in Sareni block of Rae Bareli district, Uttar Pradesh, India. It is located 22 km from Lalganj, the tehsil headquarters. As of 2011, it has a population of 327 people, in 48 households. It has no schools and no healthcare facilities.

The 1961 census recorded Lakhai Khera as comprising 1 hamlet, with a total population of 151 people (79 male and 72 female), in 25 households and 24 physical houses. The area of the village was given as 260 acres.

The 1981 census recorded Lakhai Khera as having a population of 208 people, in 34 households, and having an area of 107.01 hectares. The main staple foods were given as wheat and rice.
