= Palti Khera =

- Village
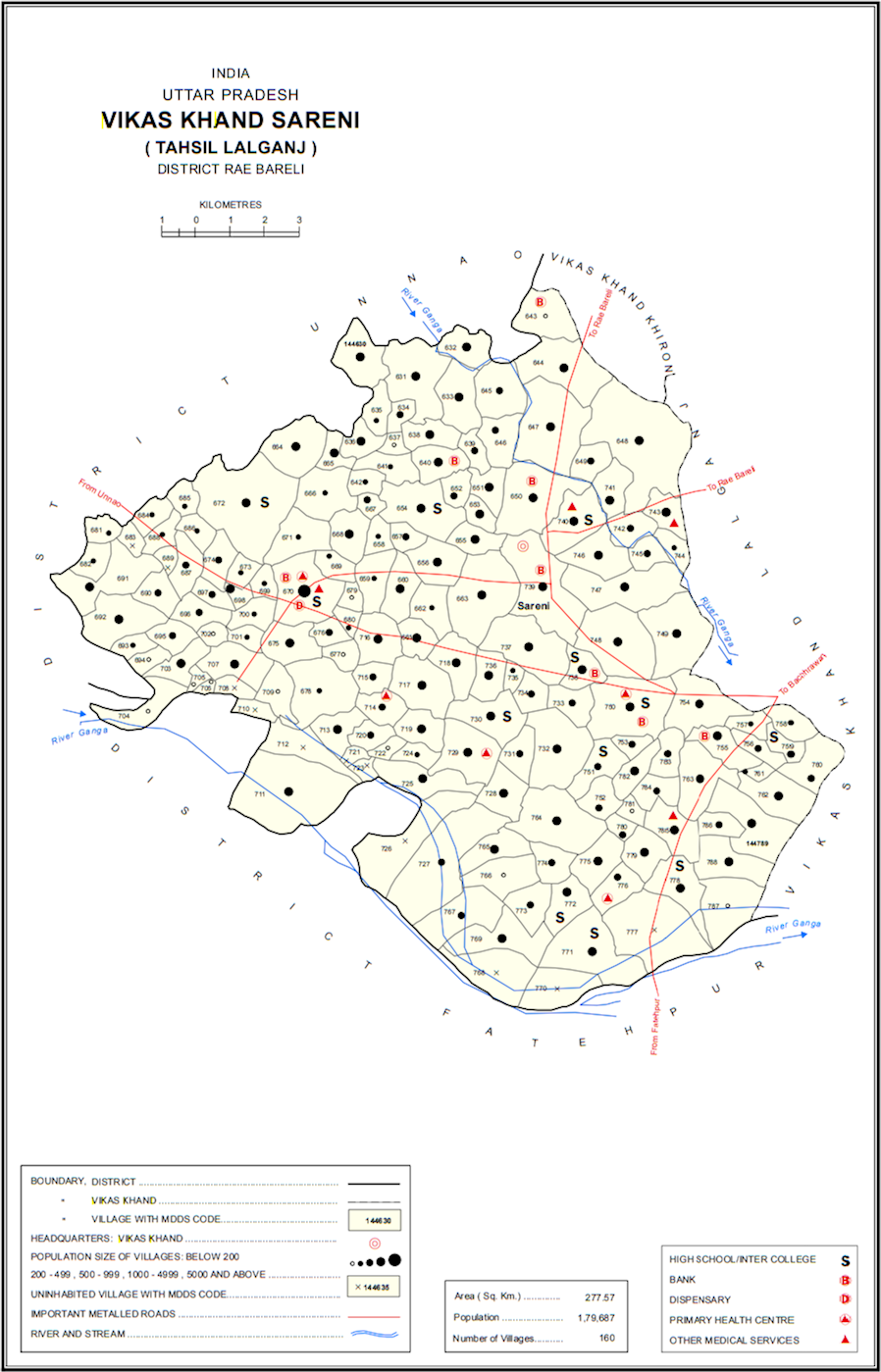
- Map showing Palti Khera (#663) in Sareni CD block

- Location in Uttar Pradesh, India
- Coordinates: 26.141475°N 80.808193°E
- Country: India
- State: Uttar Pradesh
- District: Raebareli

Area
  - Total: 3.336 km^{2} (1.288 sq mi)

Population (2011)
  - Total: 2,641
  - Density: 791.7/km^{2} (2,050/sq mi)

Languages
  - Official: Hindi
- Time zone: UTC+5:30 (IST)
- Vehicle registration: UP-33

Palti Khera is a village in Sareni block of Rae Bareli district, Uttar Pradesh, India. It is located 18 km from Lalganj, the tehsil headquarters. As of 2011, it has a population of 2,641 people, in 523 households. It has one primary school and no healthcare facilities. It belongs to the nyaya panchayat of Murarmau.

The 1951 census recorded Palti Khera as comprising 6 hamlets, with a total population of 1,118 people (555 male and 563 female), in 181 households and 157 physical houses. The area of the village was given as 841 acres. 76 residents were literate, 74 male and 2 female. The village was listed as belonging to the pargana of Sareni and the thana of Sareni.

The 1961 census recorded Palti Khera as comprising 8 hamlets, with a total population of 1,347 people (687 male and 660 female), in 136 households and 111 physical houses. The area of the village was given as 841 acres.

The 1981 census recorded Palti Khera as having a population of 1,874 people, in 270 households, and having an area of 337.51 hectares. The main staple foods were given as wheat and rice.

The 1991 census recorded Palti Khera as having a total population of 2,216 people (1,092 male and 1,124 female), in 344 households and 344 physical houses. The area of the village was listed as 330 hectares. Members of the 0-6 age group numbered 425, or 19% of the total; this group was 50% male (214) and 50% female (211). Members of scheduled castes made up 23% of the village's population, while no members of scheduled tribes were recorded. The literacy rate of the village was 34% (546 men and 246 women). 643 people were classified as main workers (468 men and 175 women), while 182 people were classified as marginal workers (6 men and 176 women); the remaining 1,391 residents were non-workers. The breakdown of main workers by employment category was as follows: 339 cultivators (i.e. people who owned or leased their own land); 194 agricultural labourers (i.e. people who worked someone else's land in return for payment); 3 workers in livestock, forestry, fishing, hunting, plantations, orchards, etc.; 0 in mining and quarrying; 12 household industry workers; 9 workers employed in other manufacturing, processing, service, and repair roles; 2 construction workers; 22 employed in trade and commerce; 5 employed in transport, storage, and communications; and 59 in other services.
