= Gajpati Khera =

- Village
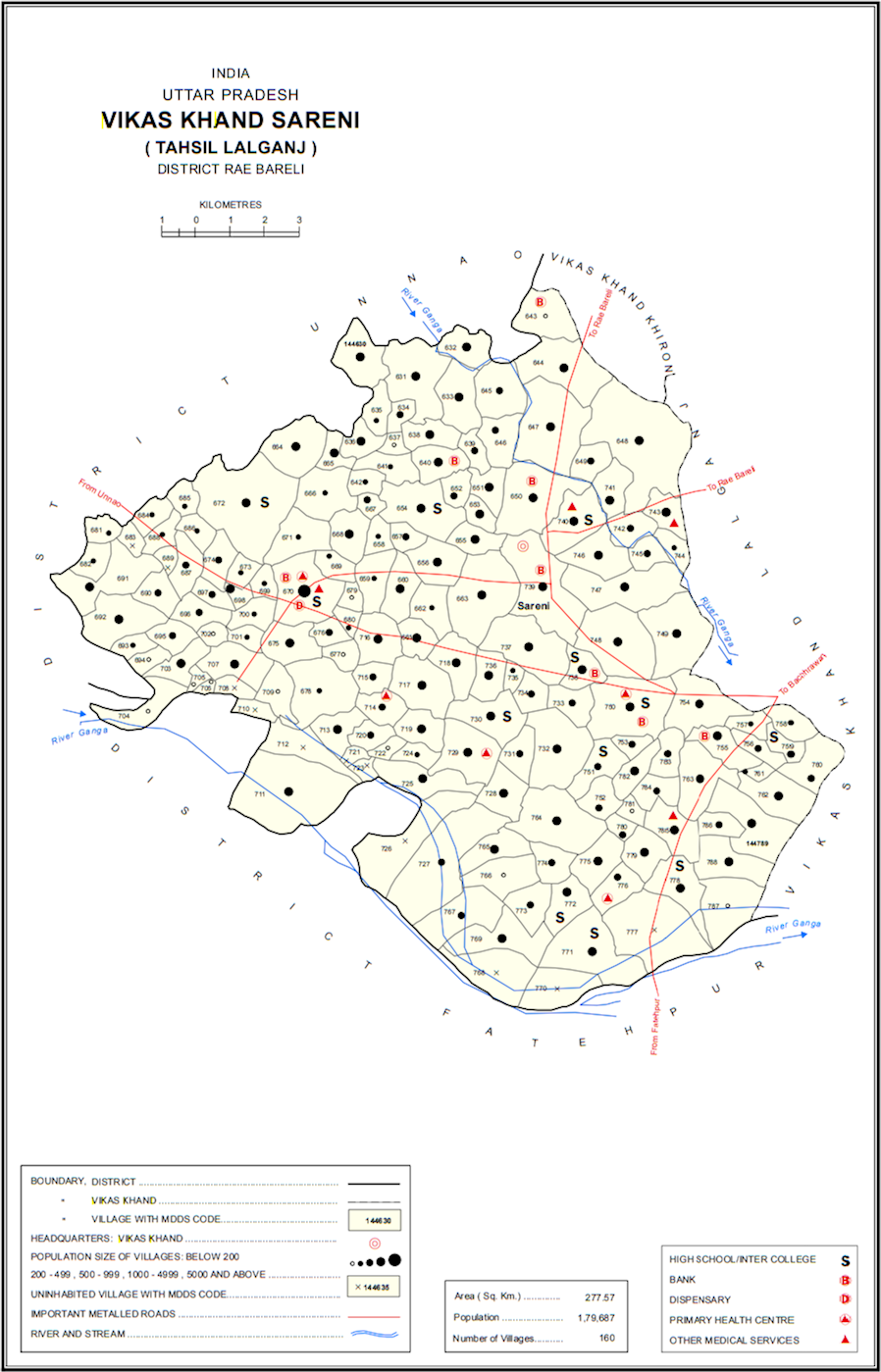
- Map showing Gajpati Khera (#665) in Sareni CD block

- Location in Uttar Pradesh, India
- Coordinates: 26.178768°N 80.764718°E
- Country: India
- State: Uttar Pradesh
- District: Raebareli

Area
  - Total: 0.824 km^{2} (0.318 sq mi)

Population (2011)
  - Total: 1,273
  - Density: 1,540/km^{2} (4,000/sq mi)

Languages
  - Official: Hindi
- Time zone: UTC+5:30 (IST)
- Vehicle registration: UP-35

Gajpati Khera is a village in Sareni block of Rae Bareli district, Uttar Pradesh, India. It is located 21 km from Lalganj, the tehsil headquarters. As of 2011, it has a population of 1,273 people, in 216 households. It has two primary schools but no healthcare facilities. It belongs to the nyaya panchayat of Bhojpur.

The 1951 census recorded Gajpati Khera (as "Ghazi Patti Khera") as comprising 2hamlets, with a population of 406 people (205 male and 201 female), in 70 households and 68 physical houses. The area of the village was 199 acres. 27 residents were literate, 19 male and 8 female. The village was listed as belonging to the pargana of Sareni and the thana of Sareni.

The 1961 census recorded Gajpati Khera as comprising 2 hamlets, with a total population of 543 people (280 male and 263 female), in 74 households and 53 physical houses. The area of the village was given as 199 acres.

The 1981 census recorded Gajpati Khera as having a population of 841 people, in 133 households, and having an area of 80.53 hectares. The main staple foods were given as wheat and rice.

The 1991 census recorded Gajpati Khera as having a total population of 996 people (513 male and 483 female), in 154 households and 154 physical houses. The area of the village was listed as 83 hectares. Members of the 0-6 age group numbered 229, or 23% of the total; this group was 50% male (115) and 50% female (114). Members of scheduled castes made up 3% of the village's population, while no members of scheduled tribes were recorded. The literacy rate of the village was 37% (263 men and 104 women). 223 people were classified as main workers (218 men and 5 women), while 0 people were classified as marginal workers; the remaining 547 residents were non-workers. The breakdown of main workers by employment category was as follows: 153 cultivators (i.e. people who owned or leased their own land); 36 agricultural labourers (i.e. people who worked someone else's land in return for payment); 0 workers in livestock, forestry, fishing, hunting, plantations, orchards, etc.; 0 in mining and quarrying; 5 household industry workers; 8 workers employed in other manufacturing, processing, service, and repair roles; 2 construction workers; 7 employed in trade and commerce; 2 employed in transport, storage, and communications; and 10 in other services.
