= Jhampur =

Jhampur Jhāmpur
- Village
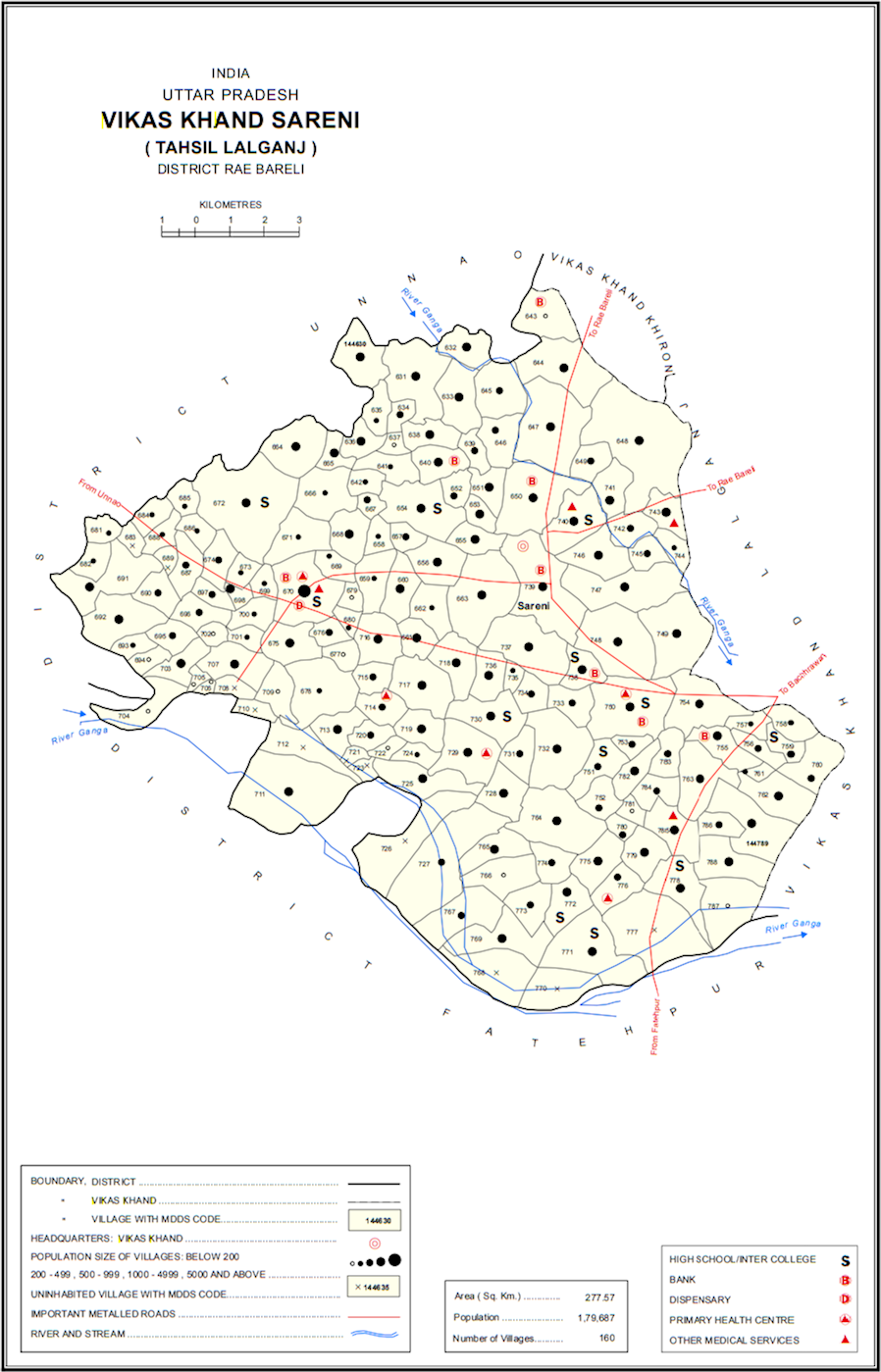
- Map showing Jhampur (#748) in Sareni CD block

- Location in Uttar Pradesh, India
- Coordinates: 26.129084°N 80.846193°E
- Country: India
- State: Uttar Pradesh
- District: Raebareli

Area
  - Total: 1.977 km^{2} (0.763 sq mi)

Population (2011)
  - Total: 1,126
  - Density: 569.5/km^{2} (1,475/sq mi)

Languages
  - Official: Hindi
- Time zone: UTC+5:30 (IST)
- Vehicle registration: UP-35

Jhampur is a village in Sareni block of Rae Bareli district, Uttar Pradesh, India. It is located 15 km from Lalganj, the tehsil headquarters. As of 2011, it has a population of 1,126 people, in 210 households. It has one primary school and no healthcare facilities, and does not host a weekly haat or a permanent market. It belongs to the nyaya panchayat of Sareni.

The 1951 census recorded Jhampur as comprising 3 hamlets, with a total population of 462 people (227 male and 235 female), in 81 households and 71 physical houses. The area of the village was given as 471 acres. 65 residents were literate, 62 male and 3 female. The village was listed as belonging to the pargana of Sareni and the thana of Sareni.

The 1961 census recorded Jhampur as comprising 2 hamlets, with a total population of 477 people (226 male and 251 female), in 93 households and 85 physical houses. The area of the village was given as 771 acres.

The 1981 census recorded Jhampur as having a population of 725 people, in 110 households, and having an area of 195.16 hectares. The main staple foods were given as wheat and barley.

The 1991 census recorded Jhampur as having a total population of 774 people (370 male and 404 female), in 126 households and 126 physical houses. The area of the village was listed as 192 hectares. Members of the 0-6 age group numbered 115, or 15% of the total; this group was 50% male (57) and 50% female (58). Members of scheduled castes made up 23% of the village's population, while no members of scheduled tribes were recorded. The literacy rate of the village was 40% (208 men and 104 women). 210 people were classified as main workers (177 men and 33 women), while 0 people were classified as marginal workers; the remaining 564 residents were non-workers. The breakdown of main workers by employment category was as follows: 131 cultivators (i.e. people who owned or leased their own land); 4 agricultural labourers (i.e. people who worked someone else's land in return for payment); 0 workers in livestock, forestry, fishing, hunting, plantations, orchards, etc.; 0 in mining and quarrying; 0 household industry workers; 31 workers employed in other manufacturing, processing, service, and repair roles; 4 construction workers; 5 employed in trade and commerce; 6 employed in transport, storage, and communications; and 29 in other services.
