= Pithupur =

- Village
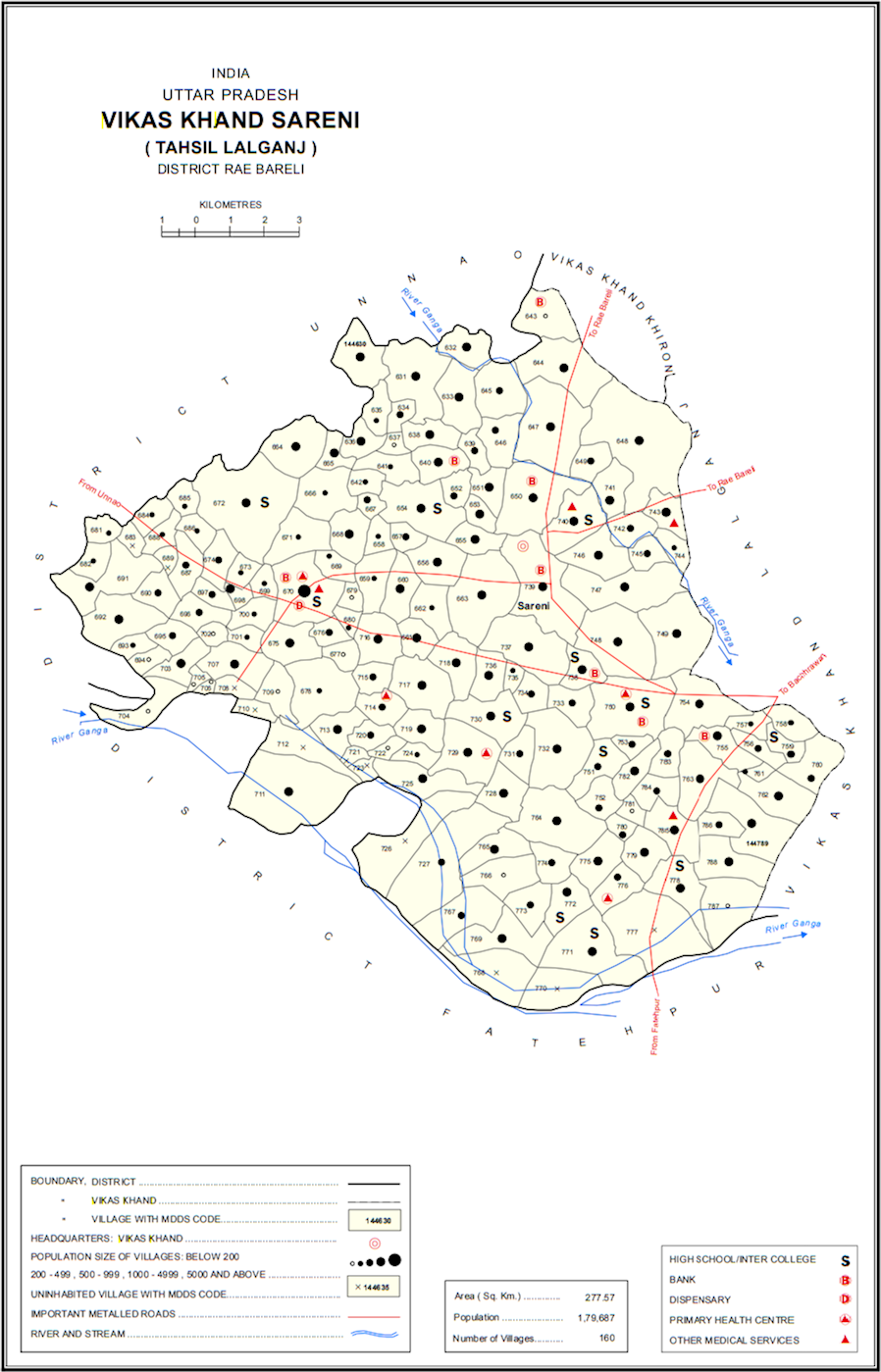
- Map showing Pithupur (#646) in Sareni CD block

- Location in Uttar Pradesh, India
- Coordinates: 26.186485°N 80.816731°E
- Country: India
- State: Uttar Pradesh
- District: Raebareli

Area
  - Total: 0.887 km^{2} (0.342 sq mi)

Population (2011)
  - Total: 928
  - Density: 1,050/km^{2} (2,710/sq mi)

Languages
  - Official: Hindi
- Time zone: UTC+5:30 (IST)
- Vehicle registration: UP-35

Pithupur is a village in Sareni block of Rae Bareli district, Uttar Pradesh, India. It is located 18 km from Lalganj, the tehsil headquarters. As of 2011, it has a population of 928 people, in 185 households. It has one primary school but no formal healthcare facilities. It belongs to the nyaya panchayat of Bhoremau.

The 1951 census recorded Pithupur as comprising 1 hamlet, with a population of 271 people (136 male and 135 female), in 47 households and 45 physical houses. The area of the village was given as 241 acres. 10 residents were literate, 8 male and 2 female. The village was listed as belonging to the pargana of Sareni and the thana of Sareni.

The 1961 census recorded Pithupur (as "Pithoopur") as comprising 1 hamlet, with a total population of 342 people (174 male and 168 female), in 52 households and 49 physical houses. The area of the village was given as 241 acres. It was part of Lalganj block at the time.

The 1981 census recorded Pithupur as having a population of 450 people, in 88 households, and having an area of 99.55 hectares. The main staple foods were given as wheat and rice.

The 1991 census recorded Pithupur as having a total population of 593 people (280 male and 313 female), in 113 households and 110 physical houses. The area of the village was listed as 100 hectares. Members of the 0-6 age group numbered 133, or 22% of the total; this group was 50% male (66) and 50% female (67). Members of scheduled castes made up 49% of the village's population, while no members of scheduled tribes were recorded. The literacy rate of the village was 32% (135 men and 56 women). 187 people were classified as main workers (146 men and 41 women), while 10 people were classified as marginal workers (1 man and 9 women); the remaining 396 residents were non-workers. The breakdown of main workers by employment category was as follows: 107 cultivators (i.e. people who owned or leased their own land); 77 agricultural labourers (i.e. people who worked someone else's land in return for payment); 0 workers in livestock, forestry, fishing, hunting, plantations, orchards, etc.; 0 in mining and quarrying; 0 household industry workers; 0 workers employed in other manufacturing, processing, service, and repair roles; 0 construction workers; 1 employed in trade and commerce; 1 employed in transport, storage, and communications; and 4 in other services.
