= Musapur, Raebareli =

Musapur Musāpur
- Village
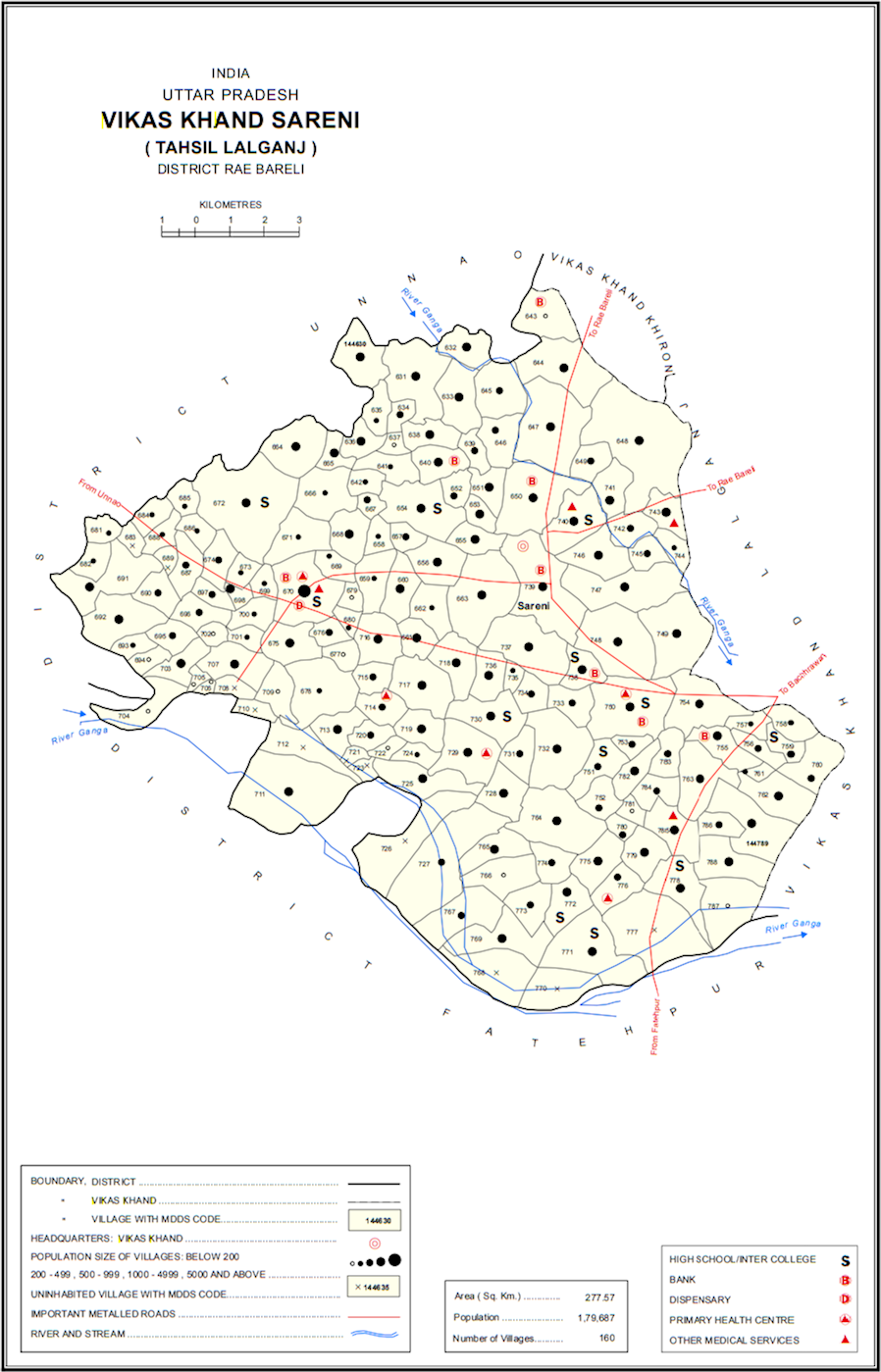
- Map showing Musapur (#144789) in Sareni CD block

- Location in Uttar Pradesh, India
- Coordinates: 26.081674°N 80.88716°E
- Country: India
- State: Uttar Pradesh
- District: Raebareli

Area
  - Total: 2.92 km^{2} (1.13 sq mi)

Population (2011)
  - Total: 1,944
  - Density: 666/km^{2} (1,720/sq mi)

Languages
  - Official: Hindi
- Time zone: UTC+5:30 (IST)
- Vehicle registration: UP-35

Musapur is a village in Sareni block of Rae Bareli district, Uttar Pradesh, India.

== Description ==
Musapur is located 15 km from Lalganj, the tehsil headquarters. As of 2011, it has a population of 1,944 people, in 340 households. It has one primary school and no healthcare facilities. It belongs to the nyaya panchayat of Sagar Khera.

== Census data ==
The 1951 census recorded Musapur as comprising 6 hamlets, with a total population of 851 people (424 male and 427 female), in 157 households and 138 physical houses. The area of the village was given as 715 acres. 156 residents were literate, 138 male and 18 female. The village was listed as belonging to the pargana of Sareni and the thana of Sareni.

The 1961 census recorded Musapur as comprising 6 hamlets, with a total population of 952 people (453 male and 499 female), in 174 households and 149 physical houses. The area of the village was given as 715 acres.

The 1981 census recorded Musapur as having a population of 1,163 people, in 218 households, and having an area of 292.99 hectares. The main staple foods were given as wheat and rice.

The 1991 census recorded Musapur as having a total population of 954 people (526 male and 428 female), in 236 households and 236 physical houses. The area of the village was listed as 339 hectares. Members of the 0-6 age group numbered 95, or 10% of the total; this group was 65% male (62) and 35% female (33). Members of scheduled castes made up 40% of the village's population, while no members of scheduled tribes were recorded. The literacy rate of the village was 48% (348 men and 108 women). 349 people were classified as main workers (278 men and 81 women), while 0 people were classified as marginal workers; the remaining 605 residents were non-workers. The breakdown of main workers by employment category was as follows: 137 cultivators (i.e. people who owned or leased their own land); 196 agricultural labourers (i.e. people who worked someone else's land in return for payment); 0 workers in livestock, forestry, fishing, hunting, plantations, orchards, etc.; 0 in mining and quarrying; 0 household industry workers; 0 workers employed in other manufacturing, processing, service, and repair roles; 0 construction workers; 1 employed in trade and commerce; 0 employed in transport, storage, and communications; and 15 in other services.
