= Dhanpalpur =

Dhanpalpur Dhanpālpur
- Village
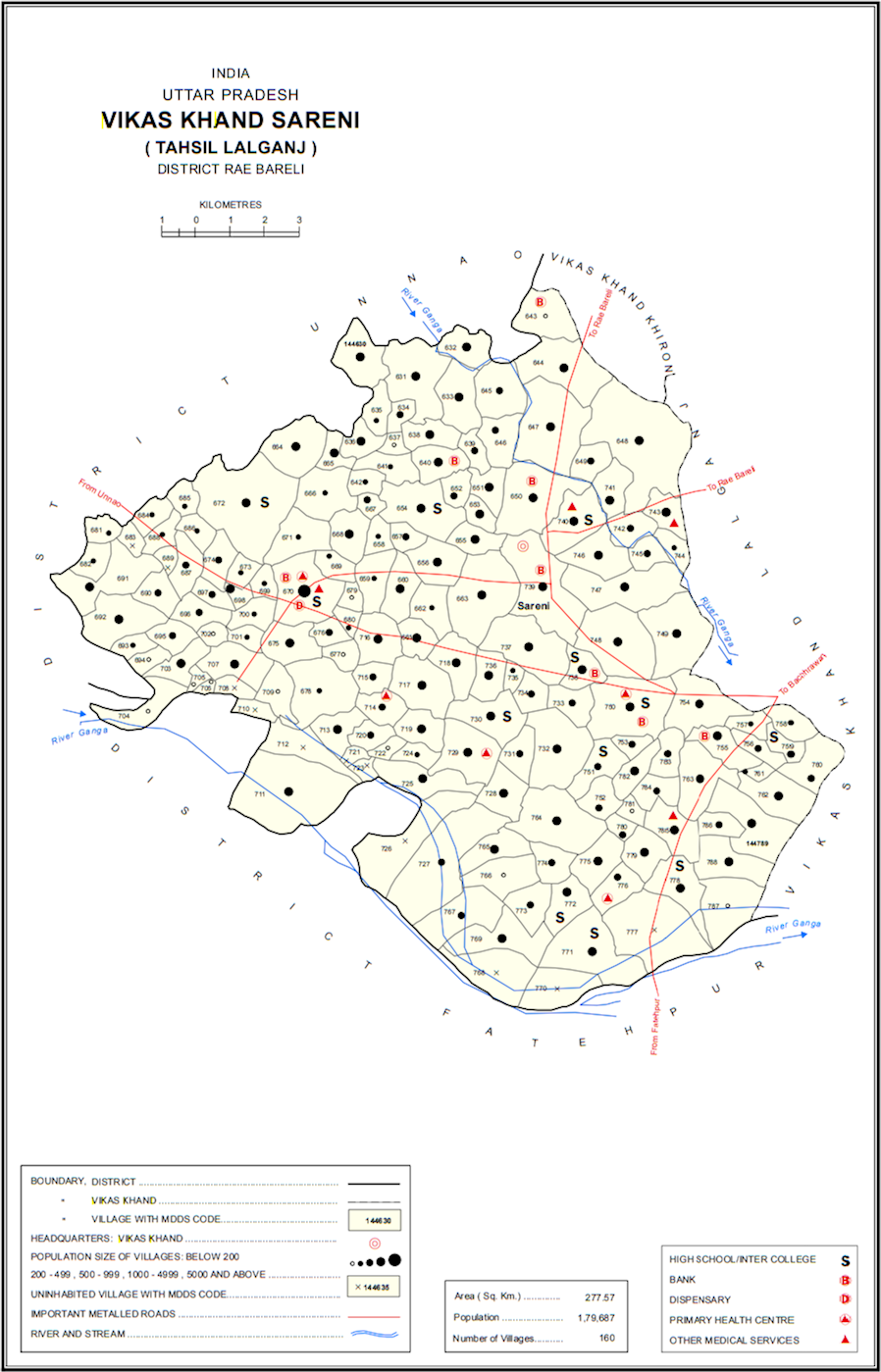
- Map showing Dhanpalpur (#747) in Sareni CD block

- Location in Uttar Pradesh, India
- Coordinates: 26.145667°N 80.837661°E
- Country: India
- State: Uttar Pradesh
- District: Raebareli

Area
  - Total: 2.452 km^{2} (0.947 sq mi)

Population (2011)
  - Total: 2,552
  - Density: 1,041/km^{2} (2,696/sq mi)

Languages
  - Official: Hindi
- Time zone: UTC+5:30 (IST)
- Vehicle registration: UP-35

Dhanpalpur is a village in Sareni block of Rae Bareli district, Uttar Pradesh, India. It is located 17 km from Lalganj, the tehsil headquarters. As of 2011, it has a population of 2,552 people, in 454 households. It has one primary school and no healthcare facilities, and does not host a weekly haat or a permanent market. It belongs to the nyaya panchayat of Sareni.

The 1951 census recorded Dhanpalpur as comprising 7 hamlets, with a total population of 884 people (432 male and 452 female), in 132 households and 168 physical houses. The area of the village was given as 591 acres. 146 residents were literate, all male. The village was listed as belonging to the pargana of Sareni and the thana of Sareni.

The 1961 census recorded Dhanpalpur as comprising 6 hamlets, with a total population of 1,082 people (528 male and 554 female), in 176 households and 137 physical houses. The area of the village was given as 591 acres.

The 1981 census recorded Dhanpalpur as having a population of 1,398 people, in 206 households, and having an area of 247.64 hectares. The main staple foods were given as wheat and rice.

The 1991 census recorded Dhanpalpur as having a total population of 1,720 people (880 male and 840 female), in 276 households and 275 physical houses. The area of the village was listed as 241 hectares. Members of the 0-6 age group numbered 316, or 18% of the total; this group was 56% male (178) and 44% female (138). Members of scheduled castes made up 11% of the village's population, while no members of scheduled tribes were recorded. The literacy rate of the village was 39% (467 men and 211 women). 507 people were classified as main workers (406 men and 101 women), while 51 people were classified as marginal workers (2 men and 49 women); the remaining 1,162 residents were non-workers. The breakdown of main workers by employment category was as follows: 316 cultivators (i.e. people who owned or leased their own land); 116 agricultural labourers (i.e. people who worked someone else's land in return for payment); 2 workers in livestock, forestry, fishing, hunting, plantations, orchards, etc.; 2 in mining and quarrying; 1 household industry worker; 9 workers employed in other manufacturing, processing, service, and repair roles; 9 construction workers; 19 employed in trade and commerce; 2 employed in transport, storage, and communications; and 31 in other services.
