= Dudhwan =

- Village
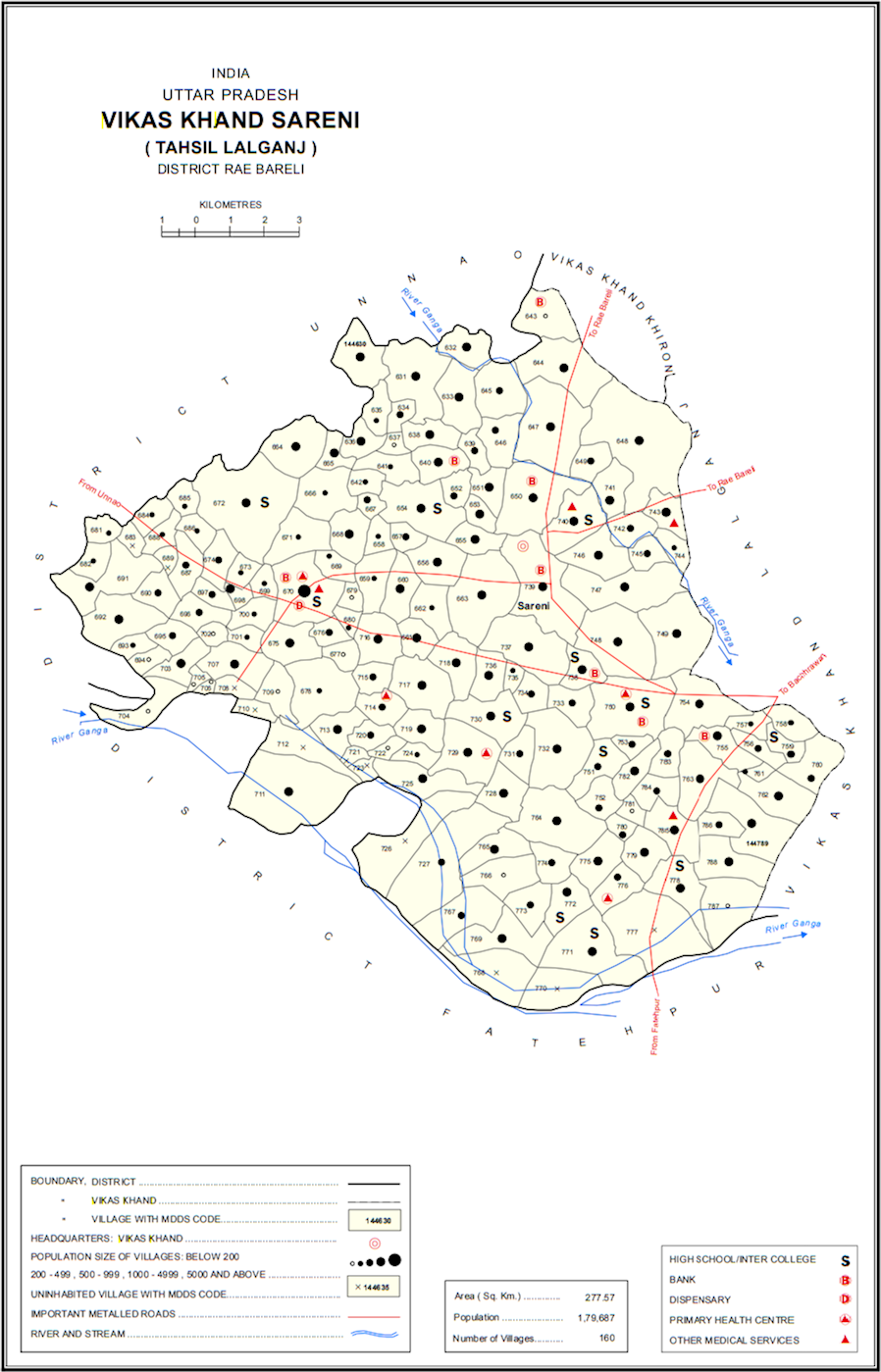
- Map showing Dudhwan (#729) in Sareni CD block

- Location in Uttar Pradesh, India
- Coordinates: 26.10107°N 80.803708°E
- Country: India
- State: Uttar Pradesh
- District: Raebareli

Area
  - Total: 3.566 km^{2} (1.377 sq mi)

Population (2011)
  - Total: 2,638
  - Density: 739.8/km^{2} (1,916/sq mi)

Languages
  - Official: Hindi
- Time zone: UTC+5:30 (IST)
- Vehicle registration: UP-35

Dudhwan is a village in Sareni block of Rae Bareli district, Uttar Pradesh, India. It is located 21 km from Lalganj, the tehsil headquarters. As of 2011, it has a population of 2,638 people, in 408 households. It belongs to the nyaya panchayat of Raipur.

The 1951 census recorded Dudhwan (as "Dudhawan") as comprising 3 hamlets, with a population of 1,034 people (487 male and 547 female), in 186 households and 141 physical houses. The area of the village was given as 892 acres. 200 residents were literate, 100 male and 100 female. The village was listed as belonging to the pargana of Sareni and the thana of Sareni.

The 1961 census recorded Dudhwan (as "Dudhawan") as comprising 2 hamlets, with a total population of 1,247 people (594 male and 653 female), in 208 households and 151 physical houses. The area of the village was given as 892 acres.

The 1981 census recorded Dudhwan (also as "Dudhawan") as having a population of 1,524 people, in 245 households, and having an area of 365.72 hectares. The main staple foods were given as wheat and rice.

The 1991 census recorded Dudhwan as having a total population of 1,822 people (893 male and 929 female), in 302 households and 302 physical houses. The area of the village was listed as 363 hectares. Members of the 0-6 age group numbered 302, or 17% of the total; this group was 52% male (157) and 48% female (145). Members of scheduled castes made up 27% of the village's population, while no members of scheduled tribes were recorded. The literacy rate of the village was 52% (587 men and 360 women). 702 people were classified as main workers (341 men and 61 women), while 125 people were classified as marginal workers (15 men and 110 women); the remaining 1,295 residents were non-workers. The breakdown of main workers by employment category was as follows: 171 cultivators (i.e. people who owned or leased their own land); 120 agricultural labourers (i.e. people who worked someone else's land in return for payment); 1 worker in livestock, forestry, fishing, hunting, plantations, orchards, etc.; 0 in mining and quarrying; 7 household industry workers; 2 workers employed in other manufacturing, processing, service, and repair roles; 0 construction workers; 17 employed in trade and commerce; 8 employed in transport, storage, and communications; and 76 in other services.
