= Bithuli =

- Village
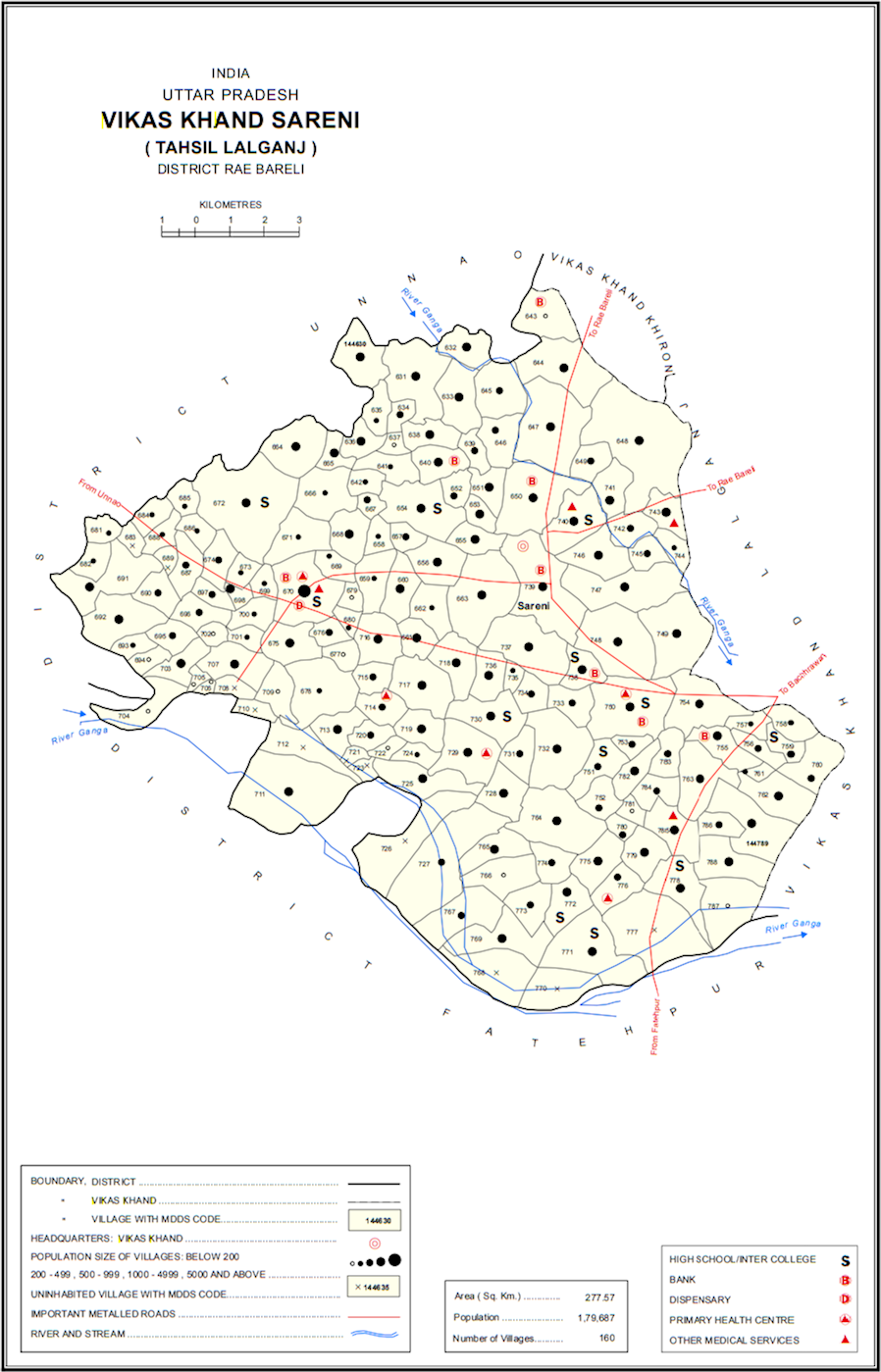
- Map showing Bithuli (#662) in Sareni CD block

- Location in Uttar Pradesh, India
- Coordinates: 26.139183°N 80.794741°E
- Country: India
- State: Uttar Pradesh
- District: Raebareli

Area
  - Total: 1.088 km^{2} (0.420 sq mi)

Population (2011)
  - Total: 456
  - Density: 419/km^{2} (1,090/sq mi)

Languages
  - Official: Hindi
- Time zone: UTC+5:30 (IST)
- Vehicle registration: UP-35

Bithuli is a village in Sareni block of Rae Bareli district, Uttar Pradesh, India. It is located 29 km from Lalganj, the tehsil headquarters. As of 2011, it has a population of 456 people, in 79 households. It has one primary school and no healthcare facilities. It belongs to the nyaya panchayat of Murarmau.

The 1951 census recorded Bithuli as comprising 1 hamlet, with a total population of 230 people (107 male and 123 female), in 39 households and 34 physical houses. The area of the village was given as 276 acres. 27 residents were literate, all male. The village was listed as belonging to the pargana of Sareni and the thana of Sareni.

The 1961 census recorded Bithuli as comprising 1 hamlet, with a total population of 267 people (114 male and 153 female), in 45 households and 37 physical houses. The area of the village was given as 276 acres.

The 1981 census recorded Bithuli as having a population of 334 people, in 87 households, and having an area of 111.11 hectares. The main staple foods were given as wheat and rice.

The 1991 census recorded Bithuli as having a total population of 353 people (181 male and 172 female), in 65 households 65 61 physical houses. The area of the village was listed as 111 hectares. Members of the 0-6 age group numbered 53, or 15% of the total; this group was 49% male (26) and 51% female (27). Members of scheduled castes made up 33% of the village's population, while no members of scheduled tribes were recorded. The literacy rate of the village was 61% (129 men and 85 women). 80 people were classified as main workers (all men), while 34 people were classified as marginal workers (all women); the remaining 239 residents were non-workers. The breakdown of main workers by employment category was as follows: 33 cultivators (i.e. people who owned or leased their own land); 19 agricultural labourers (i.e. people who worked someone else's land in return for payment); 0 workers in livestock, forestry, fishing, hunting, plantations, orchards, etc.; 0 in mining and quarrying; 1 household industry worker; 0 workers employed in other manufacturing, processing, service, and repair roles; 0 construction workers; 2 employed in trade and commerce; 3 employed in transport, storage, and communications; and 22 in other services.
