= Bahupur, Raebareli =

Bahupur
- Village
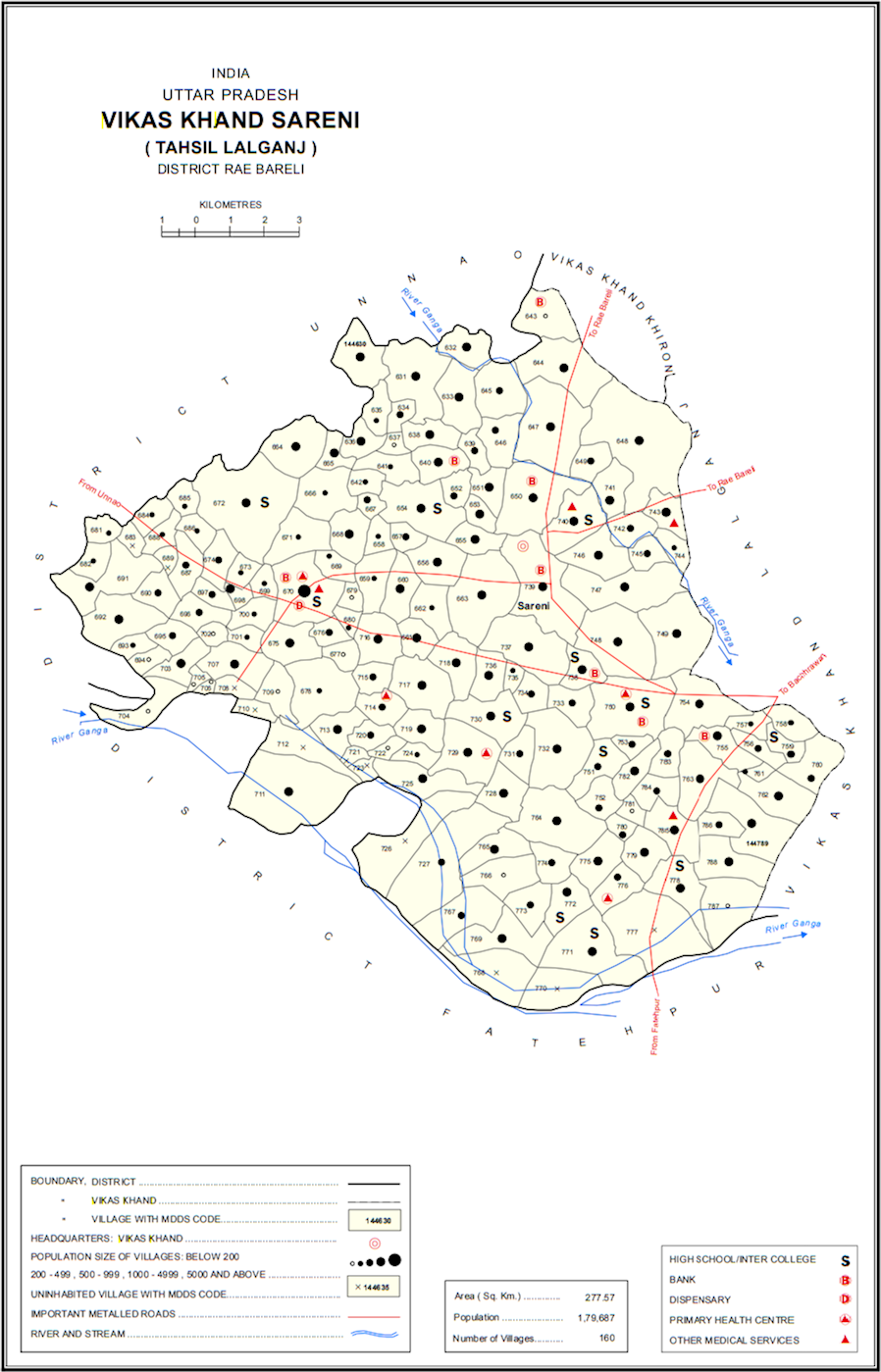
- Map showing Bahupur (#731) in Sareni CD block

- Location in Uttar Pradesh, India
- Coordinates: 26.101576°N 80.81789°E
- Country: India
- State: Uttar Pradesh
- District: Raebareli

Area
  - Total: 0.976 km^{2} (0.377 sq mi)

Population (2011)
  - Total: 512
  - Density: 525/km^{2} (1,360/sq mi)

Languages
  - Official: Hindi
- Time zone: UTC+5:30 (IST)
- Vehicle registration: UP-35

Bahupur is a village in Sareni block of Rae Bareli district, Uttar Pradesh, India. It is located 17 km from Lalganj, the tehsil headquarters. As of 2011, it has a population of 512 people, in 100 households. It has no healthcare facilities and does not host a weekly haat or a permanent market. It belongs to the nyaya panchayat of Raipur.

The 1951 census recorded Bahupur as comprising 1 hamlet, with a total population of 243 people (120 male and 123 female), in 48 households and 41 physical houses. The area of the village was given as 229 acres. 26 residents were literate, 24 male and 2 female. The village was listed as belonging to the pargana of Sareni and the thana of Sareni.

The 1961 census recorded Bahupur as comprising 2 hamlets, with a total population of 318 people (159 male and 159 female), in 58 households and 48 physical houses. The area of the village was given as 229 acres.

The 1981 census recorded Bahupur as having a population of 377 people, in 71 households, and having an area of 97.94 hectares. The main staple foods were given as wheat and rice.

The 1991 census recorded Bahupur as having a total population of 448 people (219 male and 229 female), in 78 households and 78 physical houses. The area of the village was listed as 76 hectares. Members of the 0-6 age group numbered 76, or 17% of the total; this group was 43% male (33) and 57% female (43). Members of scheduled castes made up 54% of the village's population, while no members of scheduled tribes were recorded. The literacy rate of the village was 38% (108 men and 62 women). 157 people were classified as main workers (114 men and 43 women), while 0 people were classified as marginal workers; the remaining 291 residents were non-workers. The breakdown of main workers by employment category was as follows: 54 cultivators (i.e. people who owned or leased their own land); 90 agricultural labourers (i.e. people who worked someone else's land in return for payment); 0 workers in livestock, forestry, fishing, hunting, plantations, orchards, etc.; 0 in mining and quarrying; 0 household industry workers; 1 worker employed in other manufacturing, processing, service, and repair roles; 0 construction workers; 0 employed in trade and commerce; 0 employed in transport, storage, and communications; and 12 in other services.
