= Birnawan, Sareni =

Village in India

Birnawan Birnāwān
- Village
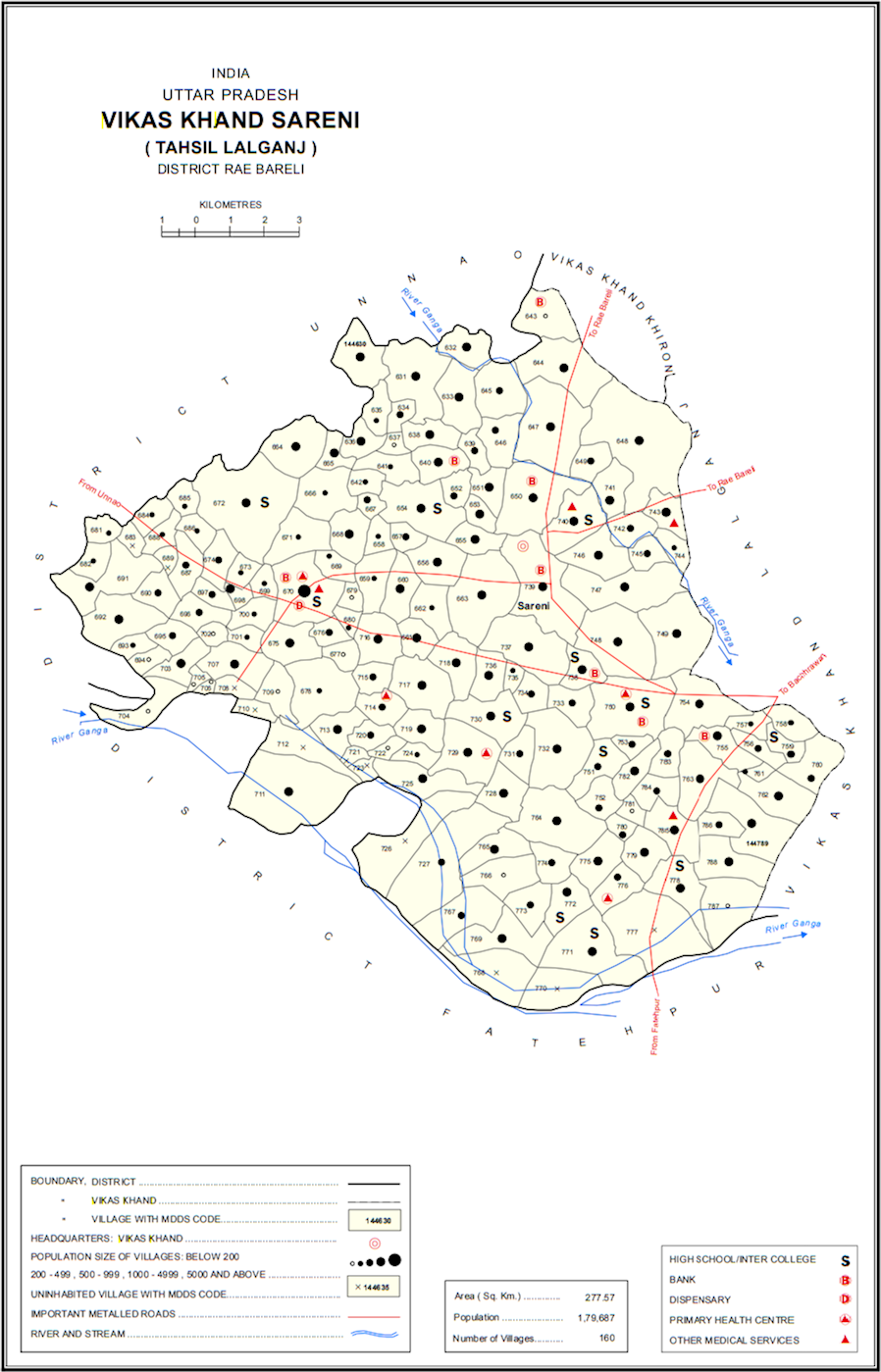
- Map showing Birnawan (#641) in Sareni CD block

- Location in Uttar Pradesh, India
- Coordinates: 26.172658°N 80.782083°E
- Country India: India
- State: Uttar Pradesh
- District: Raebareli

Area
  - Total: 0.892 km^{2} (0.344 sq mi)

Population (2011)
  - Total: 485
  - Density: 544/km^{2} (1,410/sq mi)

Languages
  - Official: Hindi
- Time zone: UTC+5:30 (IST)
- Vehicle registration: UP-35

Birnawan is a village in Sareni block of Rae Bareli district, Uttar Pradesh, India. It is located 19 km from Lalganj, the tehsil headquarters. As of 2011, it has a population of 485 people, in 92 households. It has two primary schools and no healthcare facilities. It belongs to the nyaya panchayat of Rasulpur.

The 1951 census recorded Birnawan (as "Biranawan") as comprising 2 hamlets, with a total population of 219 people (106 male and 113 female), in 40 households and 31 physical houses. The area of the village was given as 228 acres. 22 residents were literate, all male. The village was listed as belonging to the pargana of Sareni and the thana of Sareni.

The 1961 census recorded Birnawan as comprising 2 hamlets, with a total population of 250 people (126 male and 124 female), in 46 households and 37 physical houses. The area of the village was given as 228 acres.

The 1981 census recorded Birnawan as having a population of 369 people, in 56 households, and having an area of 89.03 hectares. The main staple foods were given as wheat and rice.

The 1991 census recorded Birnawan (as "Binnawan") as having a total population of 371 people (176 male and 195 female), in 58 households and 55 physical houses. The area of the village was listed as 90 hectares. Members of the 0-6 age group numbered 56, or 15% of the total; this group was 54% male (30) and 46% female (26). Members of scheduled castes made up 12% of the village's population, while no members of scheduled tribes were recorded. The literacy rate of the village was 53% (114 men and 84 women). 80 people were classified as main workers (70 men and 10 women), while 0 people were classified as marginal workers; the remaining 291 residents were non-workers. The breakdown of main workers by employment category was as follows: 54 cultivators (i.e. people who owned or leased their own land); 17 agricultural labourers (i.e. people who worked someone else's land in return for payment); 0 workers in livestock, forestry, fishing, hunting, plantations, orchards, etc.; 0 in mining and quarrying; 3 household industry workers; 0 workers employed in other manufacturing, processing, service, and repair roles; 0 construction workers; 3 employed in trade and commerce; 0 employed in transport, storage, and communications; and 3 in other services.
