= Deo Khera =

Village in Uttar Pradesh, India

- Village
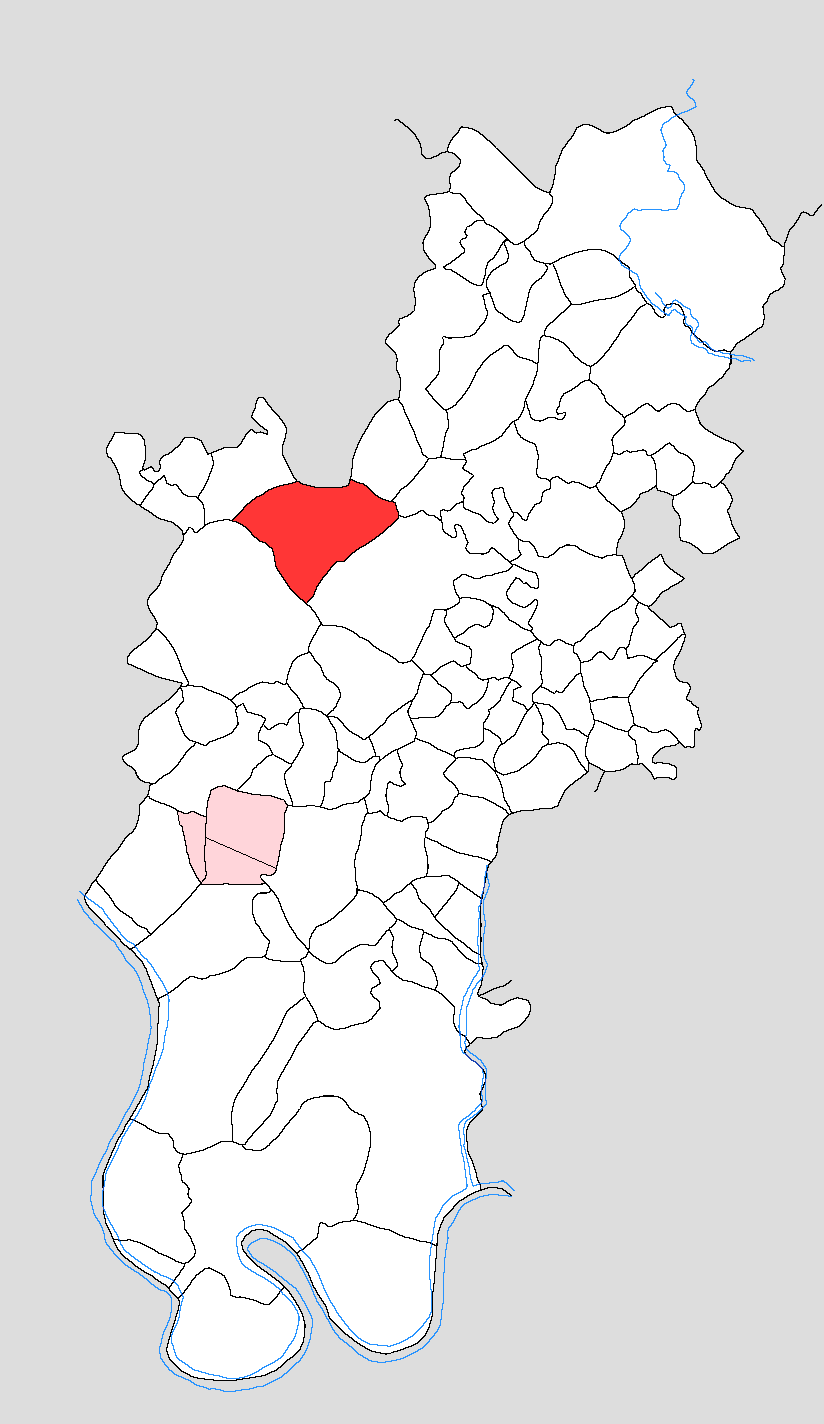
- Map showing Deo Khera in Tundla block

- Location in Uttar Pradesh, India
- Coordinates: 27.28789°N 78.25521°E
- Country: India
- State: Uttar Pradesh
- District: Firozabad
- Tehsil: Tundla

Area
  - Total: 8.651 km^{2} (3.340 sq mi)

Population (2011)
  - Total: 6,801
  - Density: 786.2/km^{2} (2,036/sq mi)
- Time zone: UTC+5:30 (IST)
- PIN: 283204

Deo Khera (Dev Kheṛā) is a village in Tundla block of Firozabad district, Uttar Pradesh. As of 2011, it has a population of 6,801, in 1,137 households.

== Demographics ==
As of 2011, Deo Khera had a population of 6,801, in 1,137 households. This population was 53.1% male (3,610) and 46.9% female (3,191). The 0-6 age group numbered 1,109 (580 male and 529 female), making up 16.3% of the total population. 3,789 residents were members of Scheduled Castes, or 55.7% of the total.

The 1981 census recorded Deo Khera as having a population of 4,043 people (2,242 male and 1,801 female), in 682 households and 667 physical houses.

The 1961 census recorded Deo Khera as comprising 6 hamlets, with a total population of 2,743 people (1,493 male and 1,250 female), in 422 households and 384 physical houses. The area of the village was given as 2,172 acres and it had a post office and medical practitioner at that point.

== Infrastructure ==
As of 2011, Deo Khera had 2 primary schools; it did not have any healthcare facilities. Drinking water was provided by tap and hand pump; there were no public toilets. The village had a sub post office but no public library; there was at least some access to electricity for all purposes. Streets were made of both kachcha and pakka materials.
