= Hyderabad, Uttar Pradesh =

Hyderabad
- Nagar Panchayat
- Location in Uttar Pradesh, India
- Coordinates: 26°49′N 80°29′E
- Country: India
- State: Uttar Pradesh
- District: Unnao

Area
  - Total: 2 km^{2} (0.77 sq mi)

Population (2011)
  - Total: 7,697
  - Density: 3,800/km^{2} (10,000/sq mi)

Languages
  - Official: Hindi
- Time zone: UTC+5:30 (IST)
- Vehicle registration: UP
- Website: up.gov.in

Hyderabad (pronounced [ɦɛːd̪əraːˈbaːd̪]) is a town and nagar panchayat in Hasanganj tehsil of Unnao District, Uttar Pradesh, India. It is located on the main Unnao-Sandila road, near its intersection with the road connecting Lucknow and Bangarmau. Major commodities produced in Hyderabad include roasted rice, food products, and earthenware pottery. As of 2011, its population is 7,697 people, in 1,328 households.

== History ==
Hyderabad was founded around the year 1700 by one Haider Khan, after whom the town is named. It was previously grouped together with the village Gandhwara as a single mauza called Gandhwara-Haiderabad, but the two had been split by the turn of the 20th century. At that time, Hyderabad had a lower primary school with 56 students and a small temple to Devi, and markets were held twice per week. The town had a population of 3,854 in 1901, including 324 Muslims, and Brahmins formed the largest Hindu group by population.

The 1961 census recorded Hyderabad (as "Haidrabad") as comprising 3 hamlets, with a total population of 3,387 (1,790 male and 1,597 female), in 585 households and 569 physical houses. The area of the village was given as 1,040 acres. The village had a post office and a medical practitioner at the time, namely Vishwanath Bihari Lal Srivastava son of Late Sri Saraswati Prasad Srivastava, as well as the following small-scale industrial establishments: 2 grain mills, 5 miscellaneous food processing facilities, 1 maker of sundry hardwares, 2 bicycle repair shops, and 3 makers of jewellery and/or precious metal items. It formed part of the community development block of Miyanganj.

Hyderabad was first classified as a town for the 1981 census. At that time, the main items imported were diesel oil, kerosene oil, and sugar; the main manufacturing was the making of parched rice; and the biggest exports were parched rice, wheat, and mangoes.

== Demographics ==
Historical population
Year	Pop.	±%
1981	4,502	—
1991	5,803	+28.9%
2001	6,917	+19.2%
2011	7,697	+11.3%
Source: 2011 Census of India

As of the 2001 Census of India, Hyderabad had a population of 6,937. Males constitute 52% of the population and females 48%. Hyderabad has an average literacy rate of 44%, lower than the national average of 59.5%: male literacy is 53%, and female literacy is 35%. In Hyderabad, 17% of the population is under 6 years of age.

According to the 2011 census, Hyderabad has a population of 7,697 people, in 1,328 households. The town's sex ratio is 923 females to every 1000 males; 4,003 of Hyderabad's residents are male (52.0%) and 3,694 are female (48.0%). The 0-6 age group makes up about 15.6% of the town's population; the sex ratio for this group is 879, which is lower than the district urban average of 903. Members of Scheduled Castes make up 20.98% of the town's population, while no members of Scheduled Tribes were recorded. The town's literacy rate was 63.1% (counting only people age 7 and up); literacy was higher among men and boys (71.4%) than among women and girls (54.3%). The scheduled castes literacy rate is 55.0% (64.5% among men and boys, and 44.6% among women and girls).

In terms of employment, 21.7% of Hyderabad residents were classified as main workers (i.e. people employed for at least 6 months per year) in 2011. Marginal workers (i.e. people employed for less than 6 months per year) made up 7.4%, and the remaining 70.9% were non-workers. Employment status varied dramatically according to gender, with 50.0% of men being either main or marginal workers, compared to only 6.5% of women.

24.3% of Hyderabad residents live in slum conditions as of 2011. There are 2 slum areas in Hyderabad: Vinoba Nagar and Gandhinagar. These range in size from about 118 households in Vinoba Nagar to 152 in Gandhinagar, and they have between 7 (Vinoba Nagar) and 8 (Gandhinagar) tap water access points. The number of flush toilets installed in people's homes ranges from 23 in Vinoba Nagar to 47 in Gandhinagar. Both areas are serviced by open sewers.
