= Bichhiya, Unnao =

Bichhiya
- Village
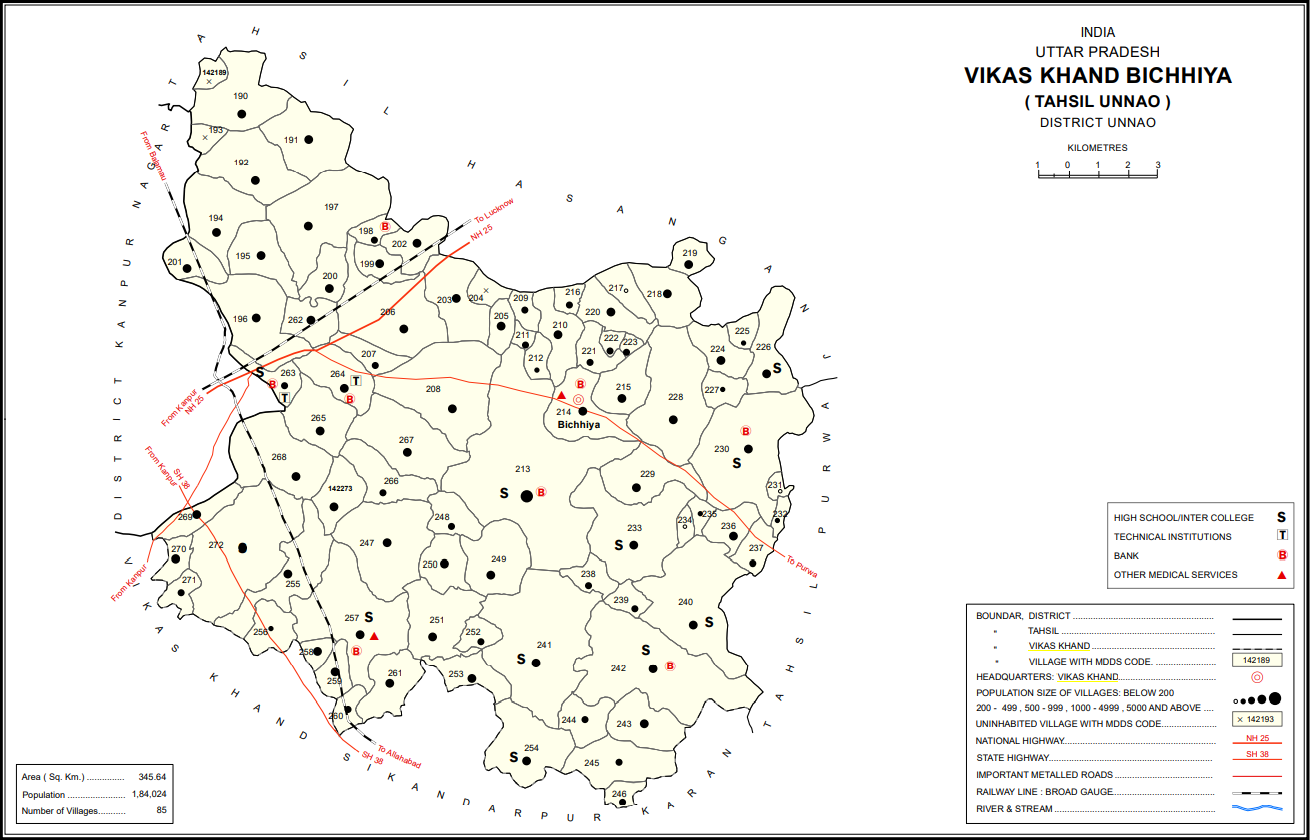
- Map of Bichhiya CD block

- Location in Uttar Pradesh, India
- Coordinates: 26°32′N 80°37′E
- Country India: India
- State: Uttar Pradesh
- District: Unnao

Area
  - Total: 3.79 km^{2} (1.46 sq mi)

Population (2011)
  - Total: 2,347
  - Density: 619/km^{2} (1,600/sq mi)

Languages
  - Official: Hindi
- Time zone: UTC+5:30 (IST)
- Vehicle registration: UP-35

Bichhiya is a village and corresponding community development block in Unnao district of Uttar Pradesh, India. Located about 16 km southeast of Unnao on the main road to Purwa, it also serves as the seat of a nyaya panchayat and has an Ayurvedic dispensary, a veterinary hospital, an artificial insemination centre, and a family planning centre. The main crops are wheat, gram, barley, juwar, and paddy, and irrigation is largely provided by canal. As of 2011, the village's population is 2,347, in 482 households.

Bichhiya block was first inaugurated on 2 October 1956 in order to oversee implementation of India's Five-Year Plans at a local and rural level. It is part of the tehsil of Unnao.

== Villages ==
Bichhiya CD block has the following 85 villages:

| Village name | Total land area (hectares) | Population (in 2011) |
|---|---|---|
| Sonegarhi | 34.5 | 0 |
| Pawai | 502.6 | 2,330 |
| Mazhkoria | 491.9 | 2,145 |
| Muluk Urf Gadar | 631.8 | 3,275 |
| Chanda | 86.8 | 0 |
| Sudesh Bhadurpur | 614.9 | 2,821 |
| Mawaiya | 325.5 | 1,538 |
| Tikargarhi | 682.9 | 3,271 |
| Rupau | 966.3 | 6,914 |
| Shahpur | 137.2 | 971 |
| Sonik | 181.4 | 1,019 |
| Rampur Khalsa | 274.1 | 1,843 |
| Sindhupur | 332.8 | 1,544 |
| Algangarh | 200.7 | 1,493 |
| Sarai Katiyari | 478.1 | 3,308 |
| Sunaidha | 99.2 | 0 |
| Maita | 136.4 | 1,139 |
| Murtazanagar | 790.2 | 3,997 |
| Turkmannagar | 124.4 | 732 |
| Orhar | 1,004 | 5,513 |
| Lalpur | 104.1 | 766 |
| Gondwa Vishunpur | 302.8 | 1,331 |
| Barigawan | 61.8 | 550 |
| Lahiya | 83.7 | 360 |
| Targaon | 2,252.5 | 11,683 |
| Bichhiya (block headquarters) | 379 | 2,347 |
| Sakran | 327.6 | 1,801 |
| Devri | 76.6 | 623 |
| Hilgi | 165.3 | 131 |
| Kuithar | 364.7 | 3,384 |
| Bhandi | 146 | 1,090 |
| Ichhauli | 261.9 | 1,768 |
| Dakauli | 137.8 | 791 |
| Atesua | 57 | 608 |
| Manya | 37.9 | 533 |
| Atarsa | 249.8 | 1,319 |
| Dherua | 94.3 | 313 |
| Mau Sultanpur | 397.6 | 2,814 |
| Paharpur | 57.1 | 244 |
| Ghurkhet | 932.5 | 2,343 |
| Badlikhera | 421.9 | 1,501 |
| Taura | 1,145.7 | 5,903 |
| Pathakpur | 25.8 | 130 |
| Khargikhera | 56 | 394 |
| Jar Gaon | 777.1 | 3,867 |
| Meerpur | 47 | 153 |
| Bhatkherwa | 80.7 | 267 |
| Jagetha | 199.7 | 1,136 |
| Paungha | 158.3 | 540 |
| Gauri Shankerpur Grant | 167.3 | 911 |
| Tiwari Khera | 116.5 | 569 |
| Padri Khurd | 1,019 | 3,630 |
| Neverna | 1,471 | 7,572 |
| Padri Kalan | 1,404.4 | 6,216 |
| Shivpur | 312.2 | 1,635 |
| Raipur Satan | 206.6 | 995 |
| Maroi | 458 | 978 |
| Godwa Bhimma | 102.7 | 685 |
| Jamuka | 675 | 4,288 |
| Chausadha | 191.7 | 737 |
| Badaura | 442.9 | 2,170 |
| Gohna | 196.8 | 1,071 |
| Aderwa Khas | 482.7 | 2,824 |
| Shivpur Grant | 166.5 | 542 |
| Mohiuddeenpur Khas | 252.9 | 1,818 |
| Etauli | 542.8 | 2,629 |
| Potriha | 516 | 4,324 |
| Mugalpur | 122.5 | 466 |
| Korari Kalan | 1,291.4 | 9,092 |
| Korari Khurd | 79.1 | 1,639 |
| Amarsus | 236.3 | 2,673 |
| Daulatpur | 119.3 | 754 |
| Behta | 321.2 | 3,144 |
| Jhajhari | 154.1 | 1,240 |
| Wajidpur Urf Rajepur | 274.7 | 558 |
| Ganjauli | 326 | 3,050 |
| Chandpur | 1,906.5 | 1,897 |
| Nandauli | 303.1 | 636 |
| Raipur Bujurg | 615.6 | 2,760 |
| Husain Nagar | 805.2 | 5,337 |
| Gadan Khera | 199.3 | 2,070 |
| Kotra | 114.8 | 1,238 |
| Chitlapur | 138.2 | 965 |
| Deeh | 1,066.6 | 8,194 |
| Dua | 267.3 | 2,174 |
