= Kursath =

Kursath may refer to:

- Kursath, Hardoi, town in Hardoi district in the Indian state of Uttar Pradesh
- Kursath, Unnao, town in Unnao district in the Indian state of Uttar Pradesh
