= Ganj Muradabad =

- Town
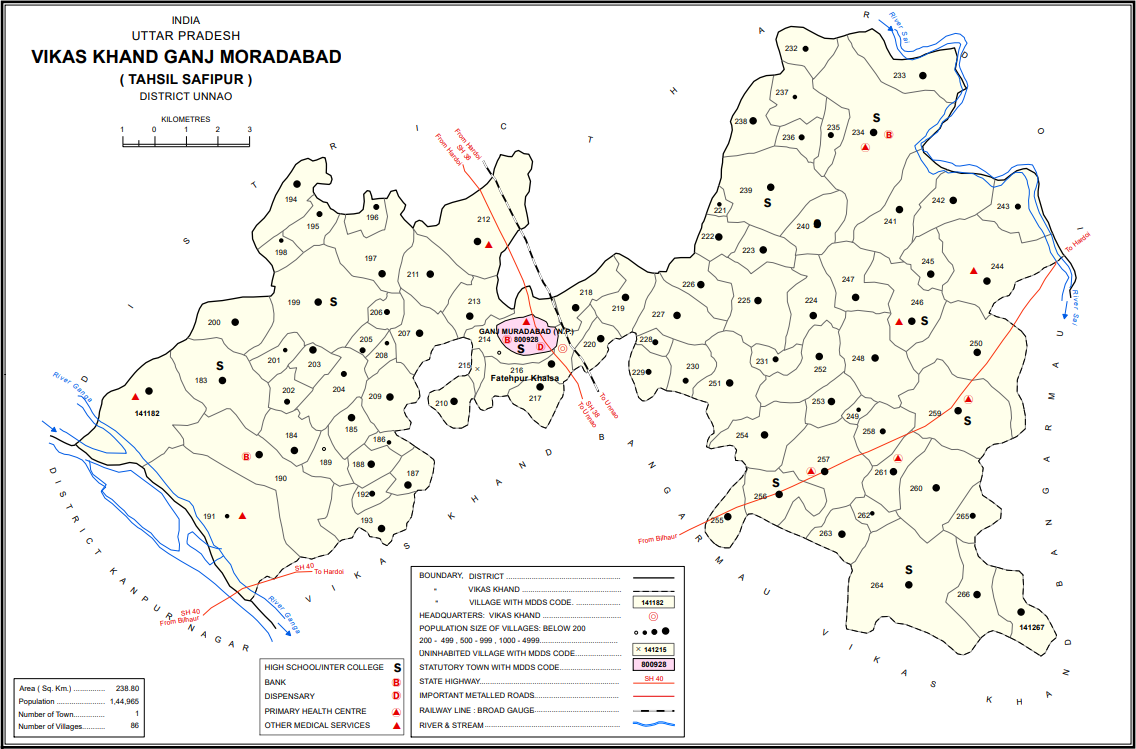
- Map of Ganj Moradabad CD block

- Location in Uttar Pradesh, India
- Coordinates: 26°58′N 80°11′E
- Country: India
- State: Uttar Pradesh
- District: Unnao

Area
  - Total: 5 km^{2} (1.9 sq mi)

Population (2011)
  - Total: 10,957
  - Density: 2,200/km^{2} (5,700/sq mi)

Languages
  - Official: Hindi
- Time zone: UTC+5:30 (IST)

Ganj Muradabad is a town and nagar panchayat in Bangarmau tehsil of Unnao district, Uttar Pradesh, India. It also serves as the headquarters of a community development block containing 86 rural villages. Handicrafts are a major industry. As of 2011 Ganj Moradabad had a population of 10,957, in 1,723 households.

Ganj Muradabad was established by Murad Sher Khan, the Nawab of Afghanistan. Murad Sher Khan came to India in the 17th century and named it Muradabad after himself. "murad"+"abad"(establisher)=Muradabad. He had a palace here which was famous by the name of Bara Dari. It is now broken due to being old, but the badi masjid built by him still exists and is quite popular. His descendants are still present here.

"HIS FAMILY SHIJRA"

•Murad Sher Khan •Karam Diwan Sher Khan •Malak Sher Khan •Sher Ali Khan •Vakeel Khan •Shakil Khan •Shayan Khan

This place is also famous for the shrine of one of the prominent saints of naqshbandiya golden Chain Gaus E Zaman Maulana Shah Fazl-e-Rahman Ganj Muradabadi, Maulvi Shah Abdul Kareem sb, Maulvi Abdul Haleem sb, Faizullah Shah Baba. This town is protected from all corners by these personalities. One can visit Ganjmuradabad by bus as well as train. There are daily bus services from (Jhakar Katti) near Kanpur Station to Ganjmuradabad; it's 85 km from there. From Lucknow one has to go to Kaisar Bagh Bus stand; there are only four bus services available in the morning till 1 pm ganjmuradabad is 90 km from there. One can also come from Hardoi as well as Unnao; it's hardly 55 km from there. Agra Lucknow Expressway is 3 km. from here.

== Demographics ==
Historical population
Year	Pop.	±%
1901	4,760	—
1911	3,296	−30.8%
1921	Not given	—
1931	Not given	—
1941	Not given	—
1951	Not given	—
1961	Not given	—
1971	Not given	—
1981	6,312	—
1991	7,906	+25.3%
2001	9,372	+18.5%
2011	10,957	+16.9%
Source: 2011 Census of India

As of 2001 India census, Ganj Muradabad had a population of 9377. Males constitute 53% of the population and females 47%. Ganj Muradabad has an average literacy rate of 38%, lower than the national average of 59.5%: male literacy is 44%, and female literacy is 31%. In Ganj Muradabad, 18% of the population is under 6 years of age.

The 2011 census recorded Ganj Muradabad's population as 10,957 people, in 1,723 households. The population consisted of 5,766 males and 5,191 females, with a corresponding sex ratio of 900 females to every 1000 males. The sex ratio in the 0-6 age group was 951, which was higher than the district urban average of 903. Members of scheduled castes made up 7.82% of the town's population, while no members of scheduled tribes were recorded. The literacy rate of Ganj Muradabad was 53.5% (counting only people age 7 and up); literacy was higher among men and boys (59.5%) than among women and girls (46.8%). The female literacy rate of Ganj Moradabad was the lowest among towns in Unnao district.

In terms of employment, Ganj Muradabad had the highest percentage of main workers (i.e. people employed for at least 6 months per year) among towns in Unnao district in 2011, with 30.6% falling into this category. Marginal workers (i.e. people employed for less than 6 months per year) made up 12.1%, and the remaining 57.3% were non-workers. Employment status varied significantly according to gender, with 53.2% of men being either main or marginal workers, compared to 30.9% of women.

== Villages ==
Ganj Muradabad CD block has the following 86 villages:

Village name	Total land area (hectares)	Population (in 2011)
Sirdharpur Ahatmali	537.2	2,109
Sirdharpur Ghat Ahatmali	633.2	3,748
Jasarapur	192.9	1,007
Khairhan	173.3	1,154
Mufarreapur	94.5	338
Dariapur	174.5	1,149
Darapur	168.3	1,658
Chandpur	122.3	41
Bhikharipur Patsia Gair Ahatmali	856.5	7,823
Bhikharipur Patsia Ahatmali	1,053.7	367
Umerpur Bakhtaori	56.2	778
Mela Ramkuar	285.6	1,149
Behata Kachh	184.6	1,286
Jalhe Pur	132	631
Lonari	110.8	622
Kushraj Pur	342	1,804
Jhakhara	84.7	399
Balla Pur	710.3	4,506
Jafara Bad	222.1	1,308
Suppa Pur	116.9	384
Rasoolpur Majhgawa	120	808
Maharaja Pur	179.9	1,034
Allmaou Saray	178.2	966
Chiteapur	72.3	507
Biraechmao	80.2	628
Chorha	271.7	1,490
Lad Pur	57.5	268
Devkhari	220.2	1,542
Bahalol Pur Mutasil	143.3	1,636
Devria	323.2	1,438
Sultan Pur	527	2,962
Lahara Pur	296	1,939
Ganj Muradabad	368.2	113
Chakkandoli	20.6	0
Fatehpur Khalsa	294.4	1,734
Raghuram Pur	148.3	1,172
Fateh Pur Hamja	187.5	2,297
Baraoki	267.8	1,749
Kapoor Pur	82.9	1,292
Chakhanuman	29.7	380
Hayat Nagar	114.3	2,301
Chaholia	176.2	1,459
Jahangeerabad	298.2	2,646
Dasgawan	409.8	1,906
Kalwari	228.4	1,109
Mahamdabad	319.2	1,888
Tahirpur	80.9	525
Hasanpur Majra	111.9	826
Madarpur	147.6	707
Akbarpur	102.4	645
Jatpur Belthara	157.7	930
Roshanabad	460.1	2,380
Bevl Islamabad	1,428.8	7,599
Patti Gowa	192.5	838
Gowa	70.2	686
Hadi Dad Pur	130.7	445
Bhikkhan Pur Gopalpur	174.5	1,083
Haraepur	585.1	3,230
Maholia	208.6	1,337
Kaitholi	247.7	1,616
Khambha Mao	242.3	1,682
Ramcote	188.8	953
Behtamujawer	620.4	4,119
Bhataoli	182.9	1,358
Abaink	330.3	2,265
Atwa	310.8	1,797
Matukari	386.9	1,847
Newada Dharamdas	64.9	244
Rani Pur Grant	585.2	1,795
Khambhaoli	315.4	1,663
Ameer Pur Gambhirpur	352.6	2,265
Gosha Kutub	174.4	1,971
Kabir Pur	298.3	2,543
Sahayami	116.5	1,653
Ismail Pur Ama Para	249.6	1,487
Jogi Cote	518.6	4,863
Dasdan	193.7	645
Asaysa	557.8	5,395
Rasool Pur Roori	495.4	3,008
Garha	188.6	1,485
Saida Pur	69.8	460
Gosha Paryag Pur	149.6	1,212
Roori Saidik Pur	1,080.6	6,410
Salem Pur	119.9	532
Mawae Ghansyam	165.5	1,286
Jhaetera	155.1	1,655
