= Makhi, Unnao =

Makhi Mākhi
- Village
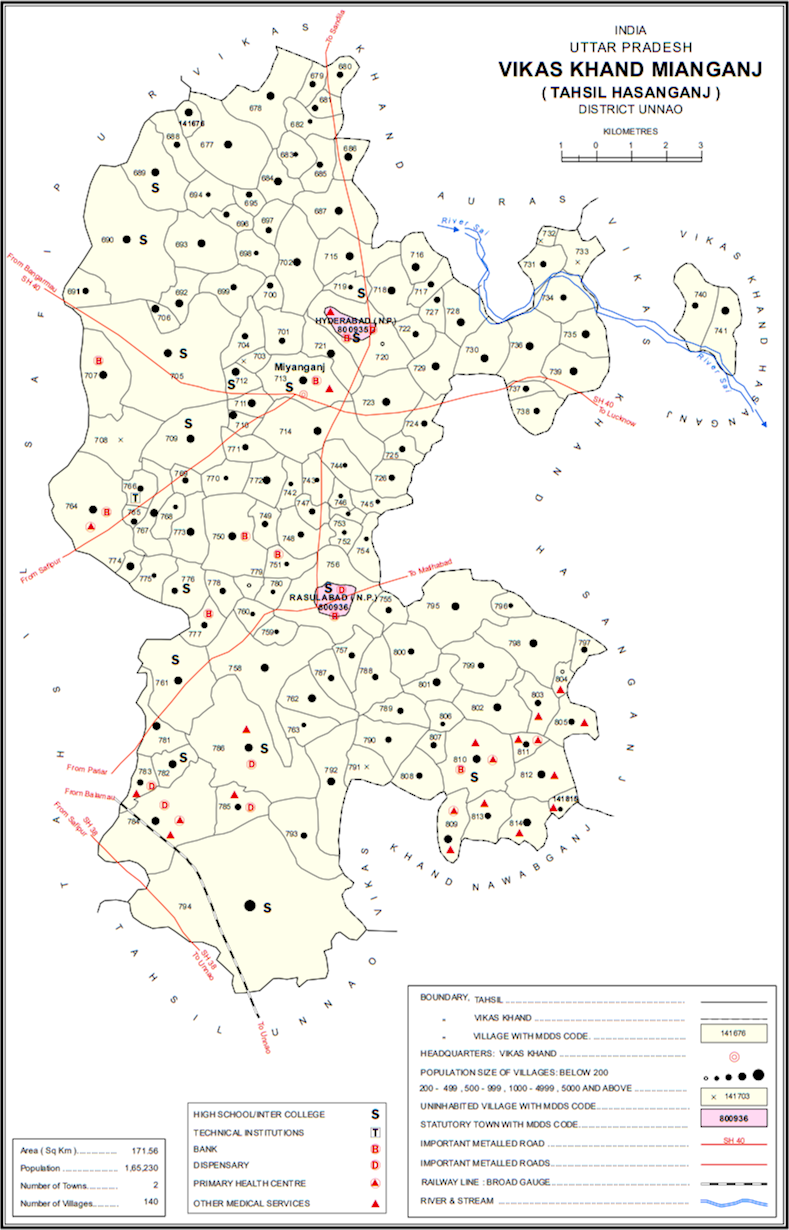
- Map showing Makhi (#794) in Mianganj CD block

- Location in Uttar Pradesh, India
- Coordinates: 26.662113°N 80.469926°E
- Country India: India
- State: Uttar Pradesh
- District: Unnao
- Established: 1771
- Founder: Miyan Almas Ali Khan

Area
  - Total: 22.168 km^{2} (8.559 sq mi)

Population (2011)
  - Total: 13,786
  - Density: 621.89/km^{2} (1,610.7/sq mi)

Languages
  - Official: Hindi
- Time zone: UTC+5:30 (IST)
- Vehicle registration: UP-35

Makhi is a large village in Miyanganj block of Unnao district, Uttar Pradesh, India. It hosts a Ramlila fair for one day during the month of Kuar, and it also holds a market twice per week, on Mondays and Saturdays. The main items sold at the market are grain and vegetables. Makhi also has a train station on the Kanpur-Balamau line, between the stations at Safipur and Patiyara. As of 2011, its population is 13,786, in 2,503 households.

== History ==
Makhi was supposedly founded around the year 1000 by a Lodh named Makhi, who named the village after himself. The Lodhs were then conquered by one Raja Ishri Singh, from Mainpuri, whose descendants remained the zamindars of the village through the 20th century.

At the turn of the 20th century, Makhi was described as a very large village at the far southern part of the pargana of Asiwan Rasulabad. The Ramlila fair did not draw very large crowds then, and the village's industries included the manufacture of earthenware pottery and some silver ornaments. It had two temples, one to Devi and one to Mahadeo, and its population (which was 4,544 as of the 1901 census) consisted mostly of Chauhan Thakurs and Brahmins.

The 1961 census recorded Makhi as comprising 19 hamlets, with a total population of 6,447 (3,411 male and 3,036 female), in 1,130 households and 1,042 physical houses. The area of the village was given as 5,529 acres. Average attendance of the biweekly market was about 400 people at the time. The village had a medical practitioner at the time, as well as the following small-scale industrial establishments: 1 grain mill, 3 miscellaneous food processing facilities, 1 maker of garments, 1 maker of sundry hardwares, and 3 uncategorised manufacturers.
