= Kursath, Unnao =

Kursath Kursat
- Nagar panchayat
- Location in Uttar Pradesh, India Kursath (India)
- Coordinates: 26°52′10″N 80°24′35″E
- Country: India
- State: Uttar Pradesh
- District: Unnao

Area
  - Total: 4.27 km^{2} (1.65 sq mi)

Population (2011)
  - Total: 6,770
  - Density: 1,590/km^{2} (4,110/sq mi)

Languages
  - Official: Hindi
- Time zone: UTC+5:30 (IST)
- Postal code: 209801

Kursath, also spelled Kursat, is a town and nagar panchayat in Unnao district in the Indian state of Uttar Pradesh. It is watered by the Sai river, which flows about 1.5 km to the north, and the Bangarmau-Hasanganj road passes about 4 km to the south of the town. The soil here is mostly loam and clay, with a small amount of sand. The main crops are wheat, barley, bejhar, juwar, bajra, paddy, maize, and sugarcane. Irrigation is provided mainly by canal.

As of 2011, the population of Kursath is 6,770, in 1,044 households. Major industries include the production of shoes and slippers, furniture, and zardozi work.

This town is situated in between island of ponds from three sides (west east and south); it is open from the north, but this side is also covered with a medium size canal dereveted from sharda canal at chuadhary khera pul.

== History ==
The site of modern-day Kursath was originally occupied by a village called Khajuriya, which was ruled by a local tribe known as the Shahids. The remains of their fort still exist at Kursath. Supposedly the first Mughal emperor, Babur, sent a subahdar named Quds-ud-Din to subjugate the Shahids. Quds-ud-Din was successful, and he razed the old village of Khajuriya, which he re-founded and named "Qudsat" after himself, hence the present name. Some of the soldiers in Quds-ud-Din's army also received shares in the village lands: Quds-ud-Din got half, while the Sheikhs and Afghans each got a quarter. Their descendants all kept these shares, with Quds-ud-Din's being the village's zamindars.

At the turn of the 20th century, Kursath was described as follows: "The scenery is pleasant, the land level, the climate healthy, and the water mostly good; there is a little jungle towards the west." The old canal of Ghazi-ud-Din Haidar crossed through the town lands on the north side, where they flowed into the Sai river. Kursath had a lower primary school with 36 students and a market held once per week. Its population in 1901 was 6,431, including 4,357 Hindus and 2,074 Muslims. It had grown significantly in the past half-century — the population had been 5,373 in 1869.

The 1961 census recorded Kursath (as "Kursat") as comprising 29 hamlets, with a total population of 8,460 people (4,578 male and 3,882 female), in 1,532 households and 1,227 physical houses. It was the largest village in the district at the time. The village lands covered an area of 1,960 hectares, of which 1,082 were cultivated. At that time, it held a market on Sundays and Wednesdays, specialising in grain, vegetables, and various everyday essentials; its average attendance was recorded as 2,300 people. It also had the following small industrial establishments: 3 grain mills, 3 makers of edible fats and/or oils, 3 miscellaneous food processing facilities, 2 makers of cotton cloth by handloom, 7 makers of textiles, 12 makers of miscellaneous wooden products, 2 makers of shoes, 4 bicycle repair shops, and 2 unclassified manufacturers and/or repairers.

Kursath was first classified as a town for the 1981 census. At that time, its main items of manufacture were listed as rice and beedies.

== Demographics ==
Historical population
Year	Pop.	±%
1981	4,003	—
1991	4,948	+23.6%
2001	5,854	+18.3%
2011	6,770	+15.6%
Source: 2011 Census of India

As of 2001 India census, Kursath had a population of 6,030. Males constitute 52% of the population and females 48%. Kursath has an average literacy rate of 42%, lower than the national average of 59.5%: male literacy is 49%, and female literacy is 35%. In Kursath, 21% of the population is under 6 years of age.

According to the 2011 census, Kursath has a population of 6,770 people, in 1,044 households. The town's sex ratio is 957 females to every 1000 males; 3,459 of Kursath's residents are male (51.1%) and 3,311 are female (48.9%). The 0-6 age group makes up about 16.7% of the town's population; among this group, the sex ratio is 982, which is the highest among towns in Unnao district. Members of Scheduled Castes make up 7.78% of the town's population, while no members of Scheduled Tribes were recorded. The town's literacy rate was 63.2% (counting only people age 7 and up); literacy was higher among men and boys (71.3%) than among women and girls (54.7%). The scheduled castes literacy rate is 46.1% (57.9% among men and boys, and 32.7% among women and girls).

In terms of employment, 21.8% of Kursath residents were classified as main workers (i.e. people employed for at least 6 months per year) in 2011. Marginal workers (i.e. people employed for less than 6 months per year) made up 9.1%, and the remaining 69.1% were non-workers. Employment status varied heavily according to gender, with 50.2% of men being either main or marginal workers, compared to only 10.7% of women.

18.8% of Kursath residents live in slum conditions as of 2011. There are 4 slum areas in Kursath: Bari West, Kasaita, Godiana, and Chamraudha (the largest). These range in size from about 40 to 90 households and have between 3 and 8 tap water access points. The number of flush toilets installed in people's homes ranges from 10 in Bari West to 45 in Chamraudha. All 4 areas are serviced by open sewers.
