= Surseni =

- Village
- Location in Uttar Pradesh, India
- Coordinates: 26.9°N 80.22°E
- Country: India
- State: Uttar Pradesh
- District: Unnao
- Founder: Nanhu Jiledar
- Elevation: 122 m (400 ft)

Population (2011)
  - Total: 10,231

Languages
  - Official: Hindi, Urdu
- Time zone: UTC+5:30 (IST)
- Postal code: 209868
- Website: http://shahnawazkhansurseni.blogspot.com/
- Added By Shahnawaz khan

Surseni is a village in the Unnao district of Uttar Pradesh, India on the Lucknow-Bangarmau Road about 2 km from Bangarmau (Tehsil Sub-District), 50 km from Unnao, 25 km from Safipur and 40 km from city of Kannauj. It is approximately 600 years old. The population was approximately 11,000 as of the 2011 census.

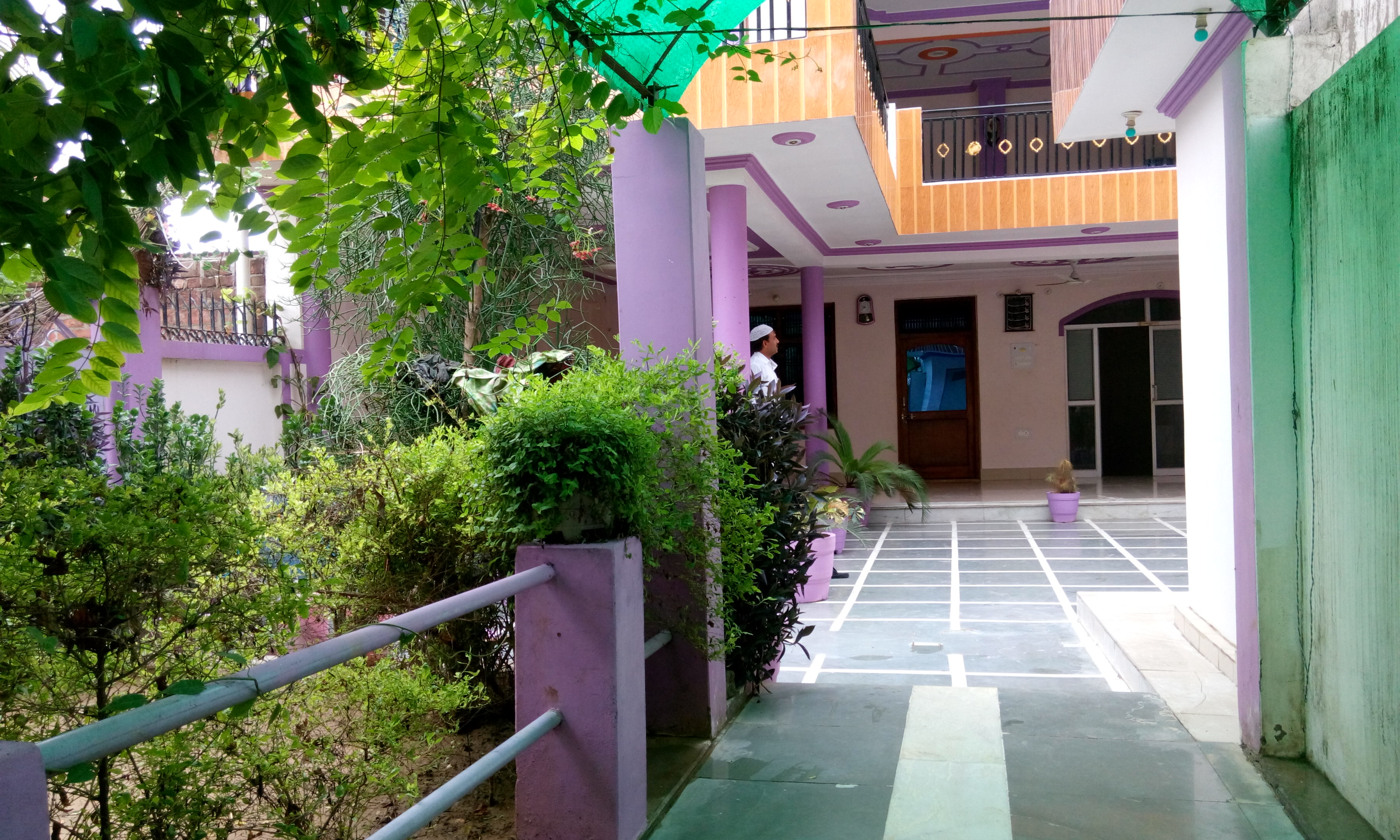
A house in Surseni

== Mosques ==
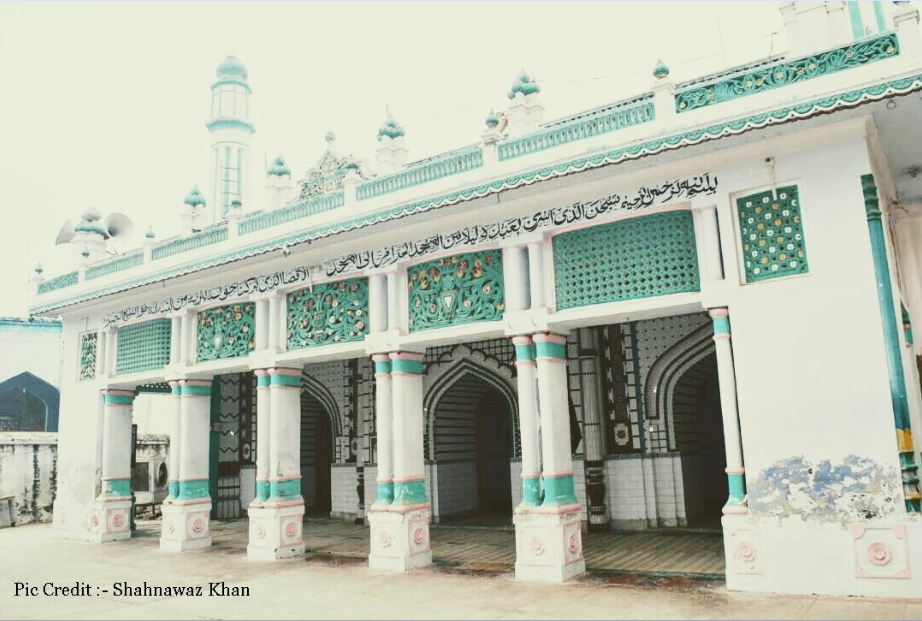
Badi Masjid Surseni

Surseni has seven mosques, the oldest of which, Jama Masjid, is over 500 years old and an example of Mughal architecture.

== Gallery ==
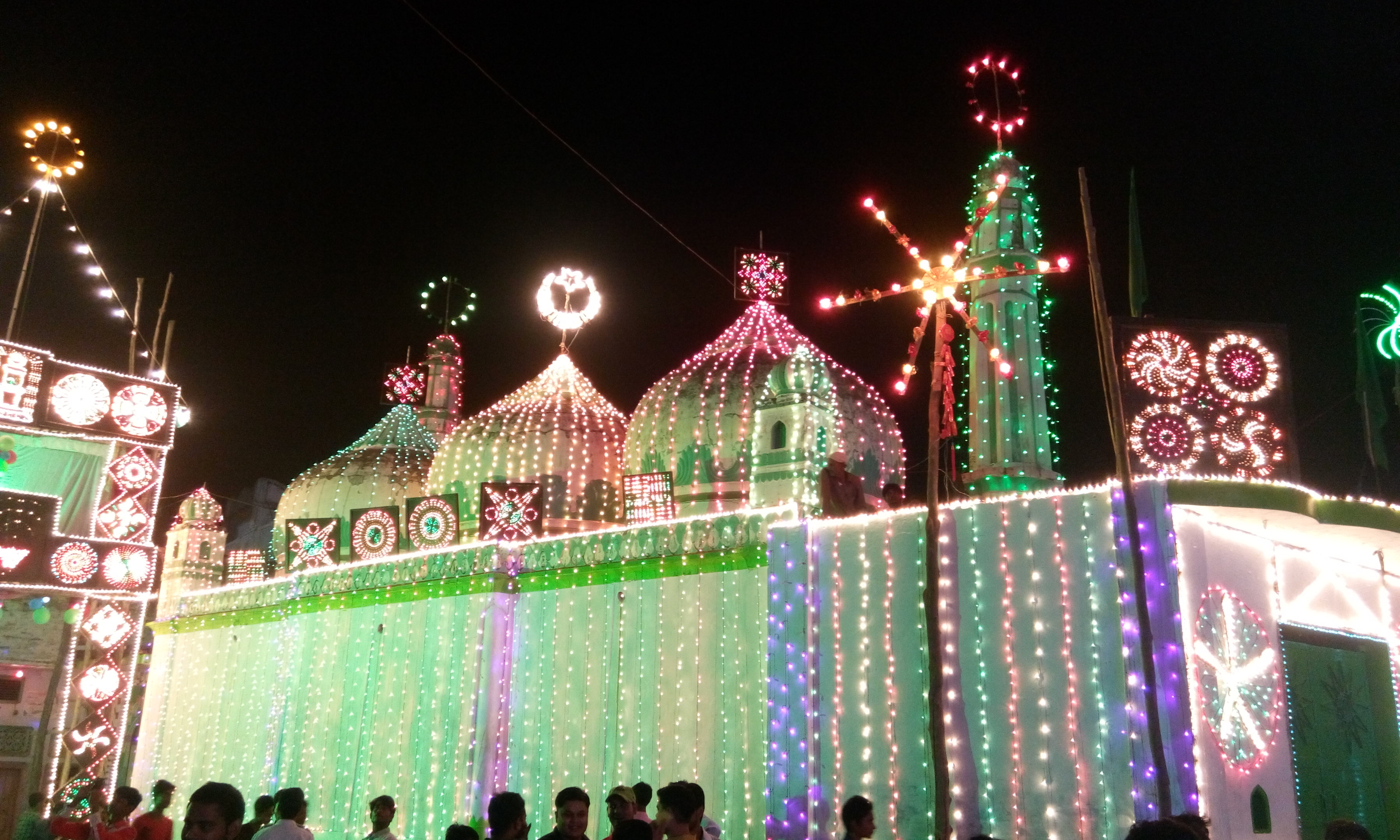
Badi Masjid in Muharram

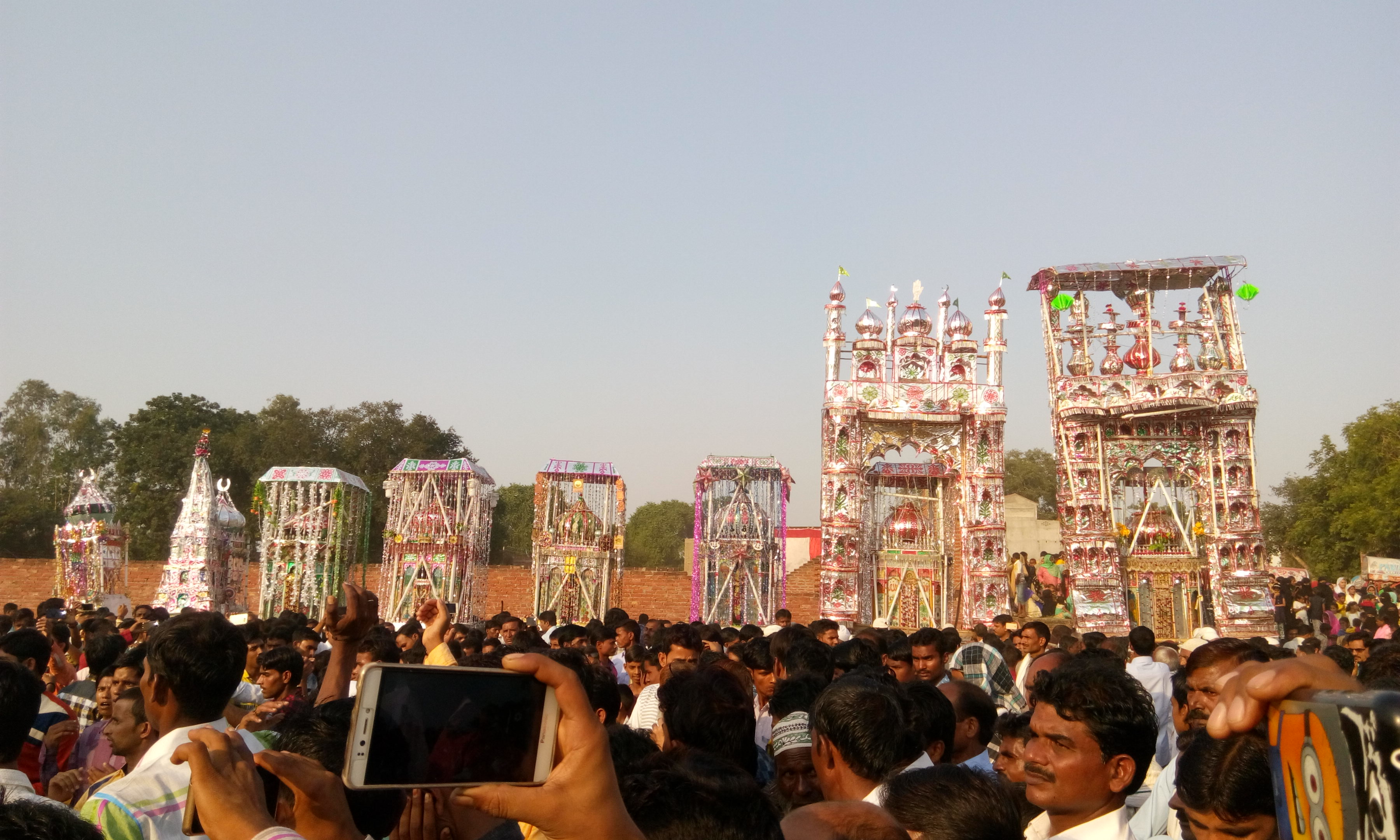
11th day of Muharram in Surseni

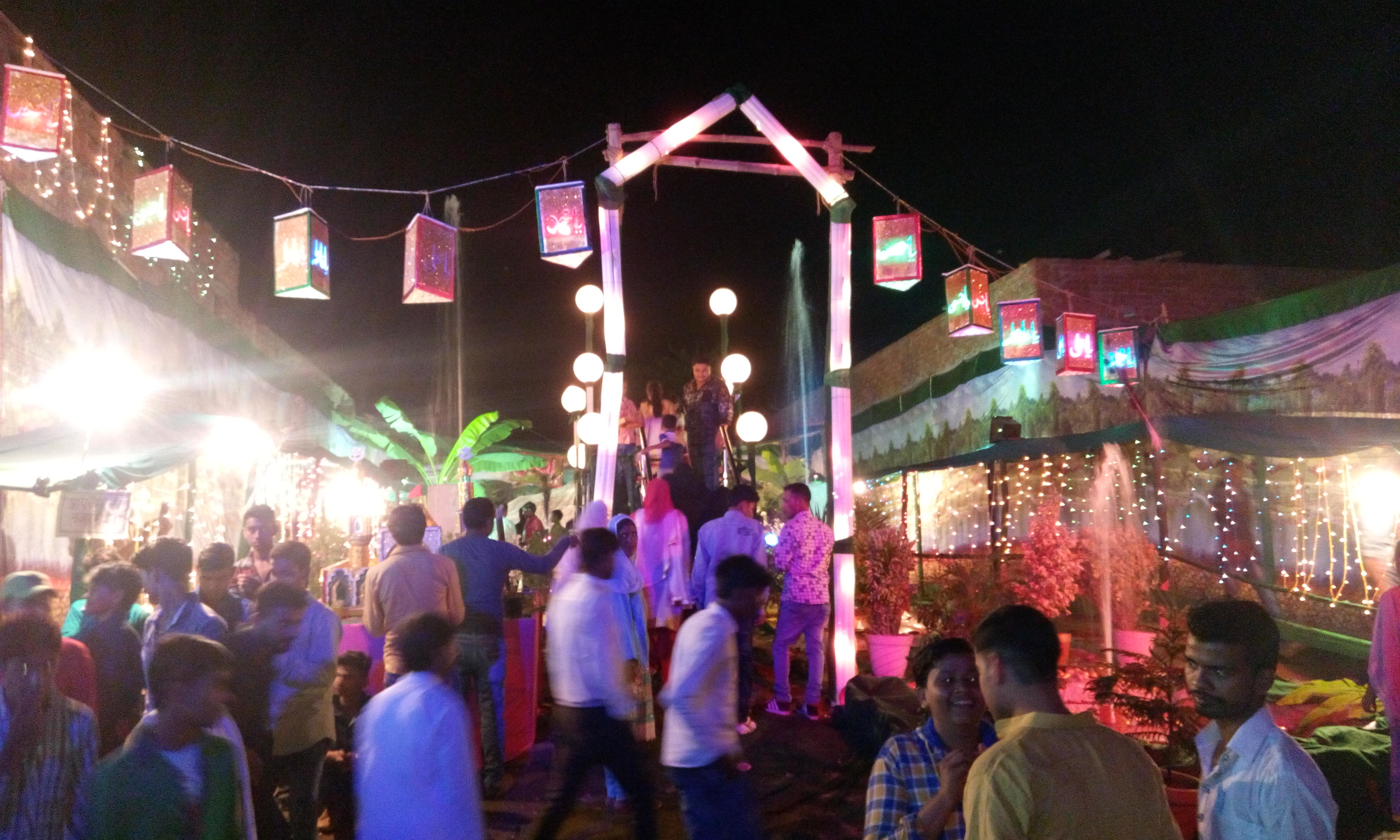
Decoration in village

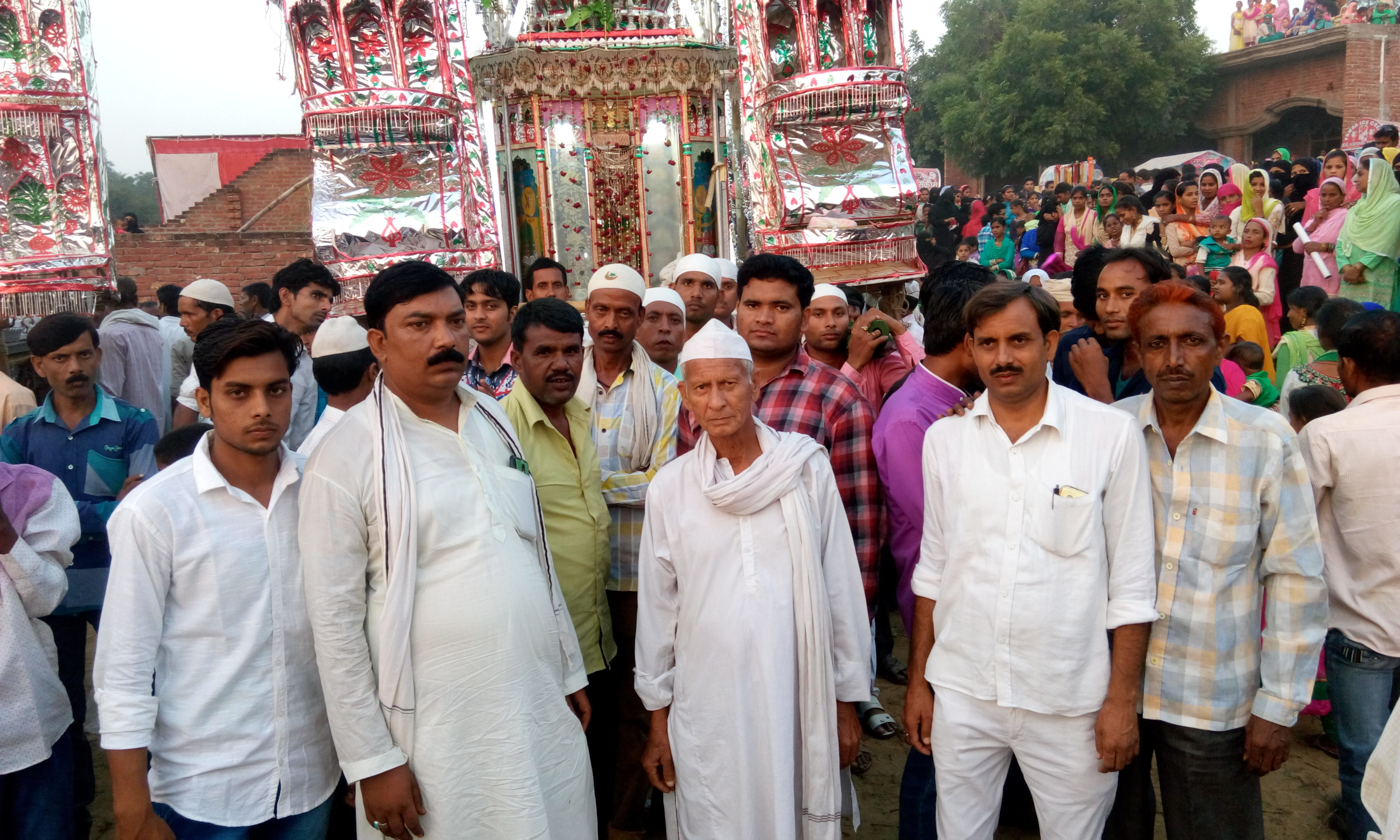
Member of Azadar-e-Hussain

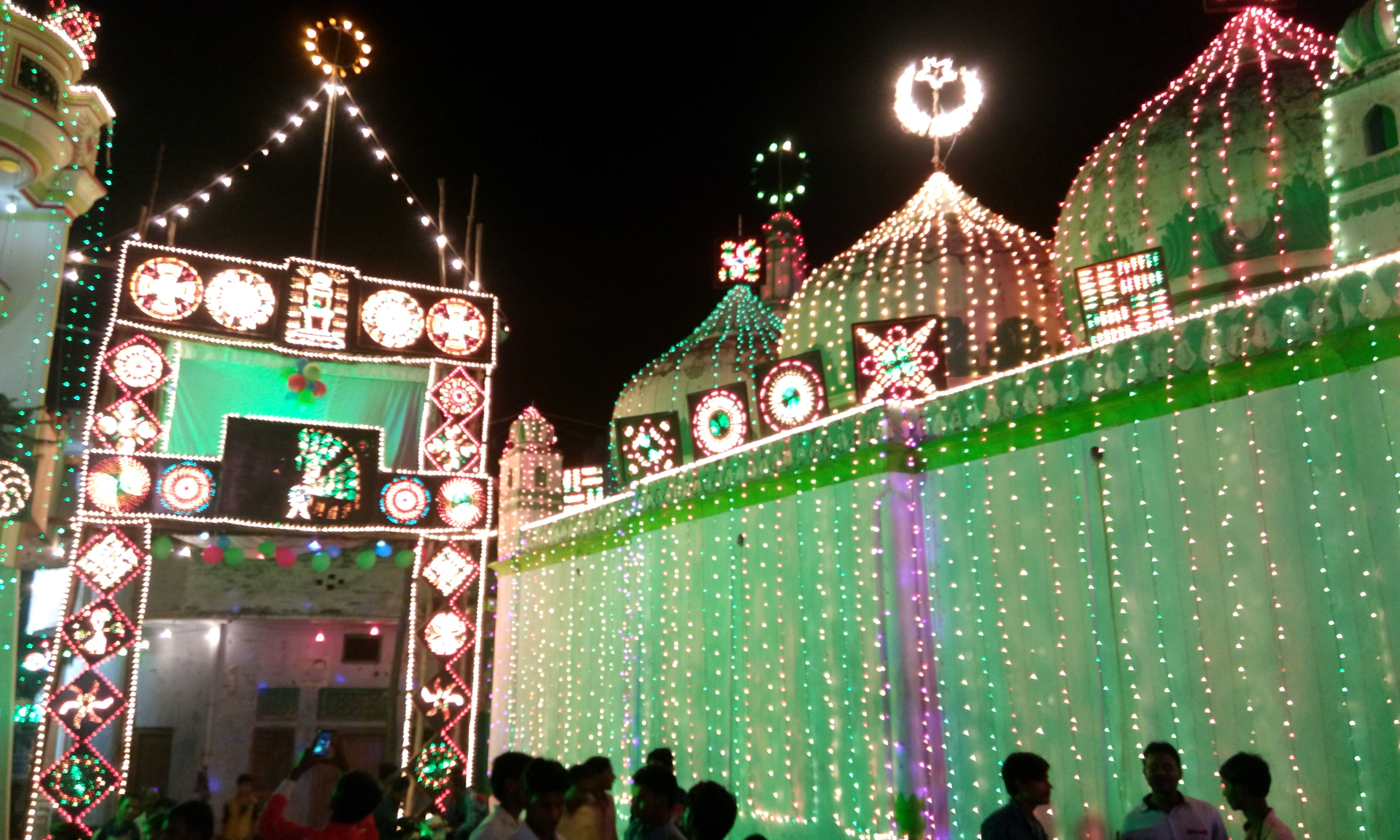
Lighting on Bari Masjid

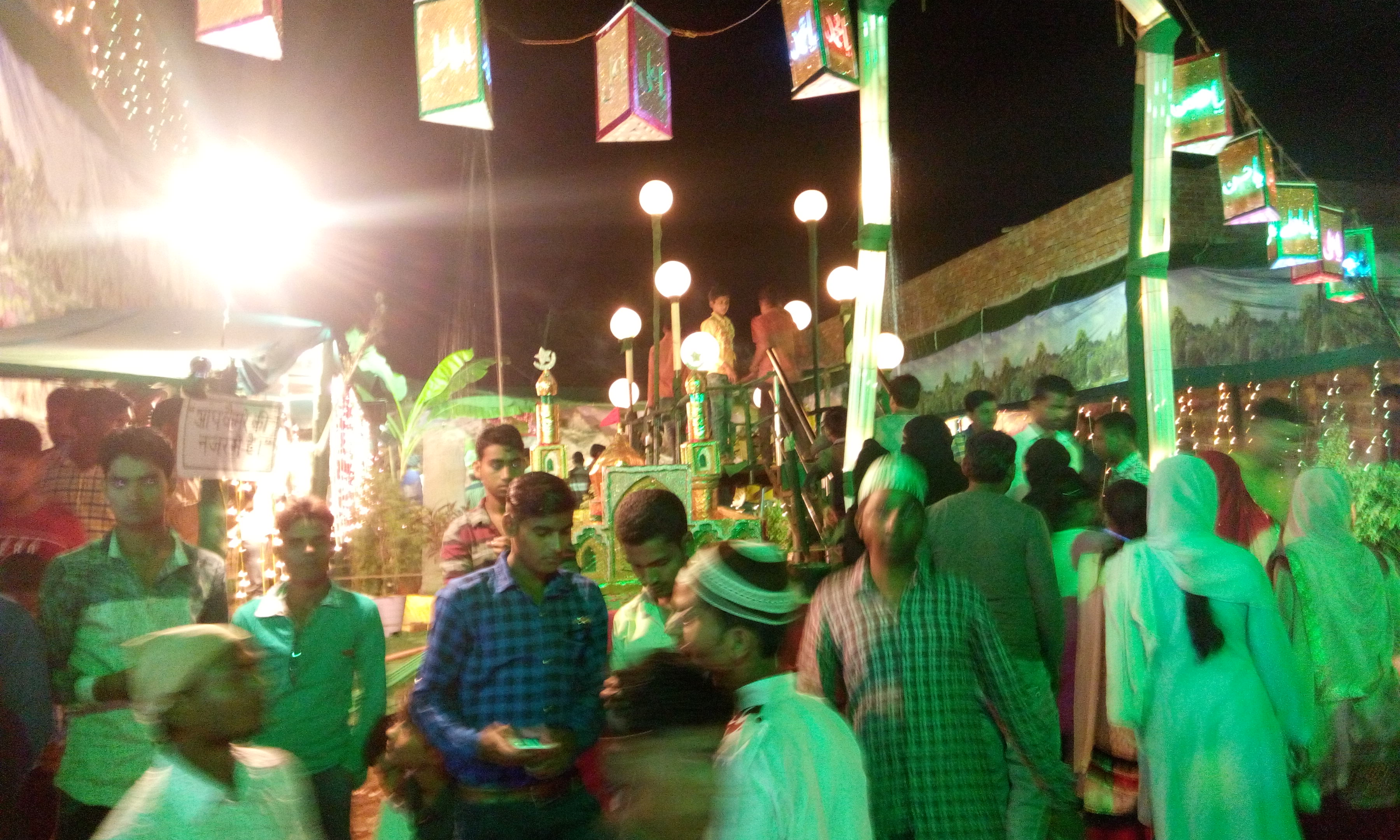
Bara Mohalla

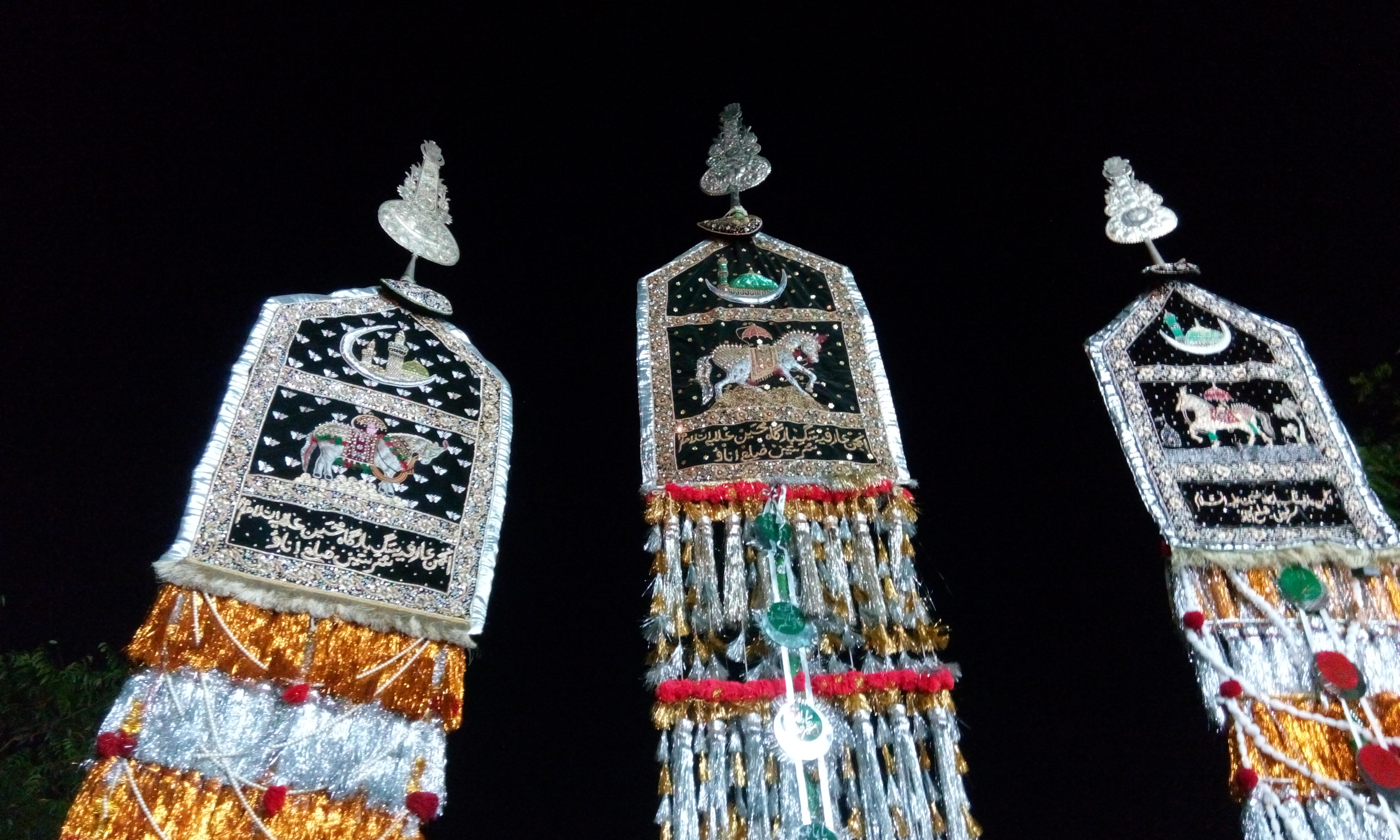
Alam

== Education ==
Surseni has four madrasas, two government schools and three private schools where many of the students come from other villages.

== Transportation ==
There are public and private buses in the village and a railway station within 2 km. Lucknow Airport is about 45 km away.
