= Auras, Uttar Pradesh =

Auras Aryan Nagar
- Township
- Nickname: Auraiite
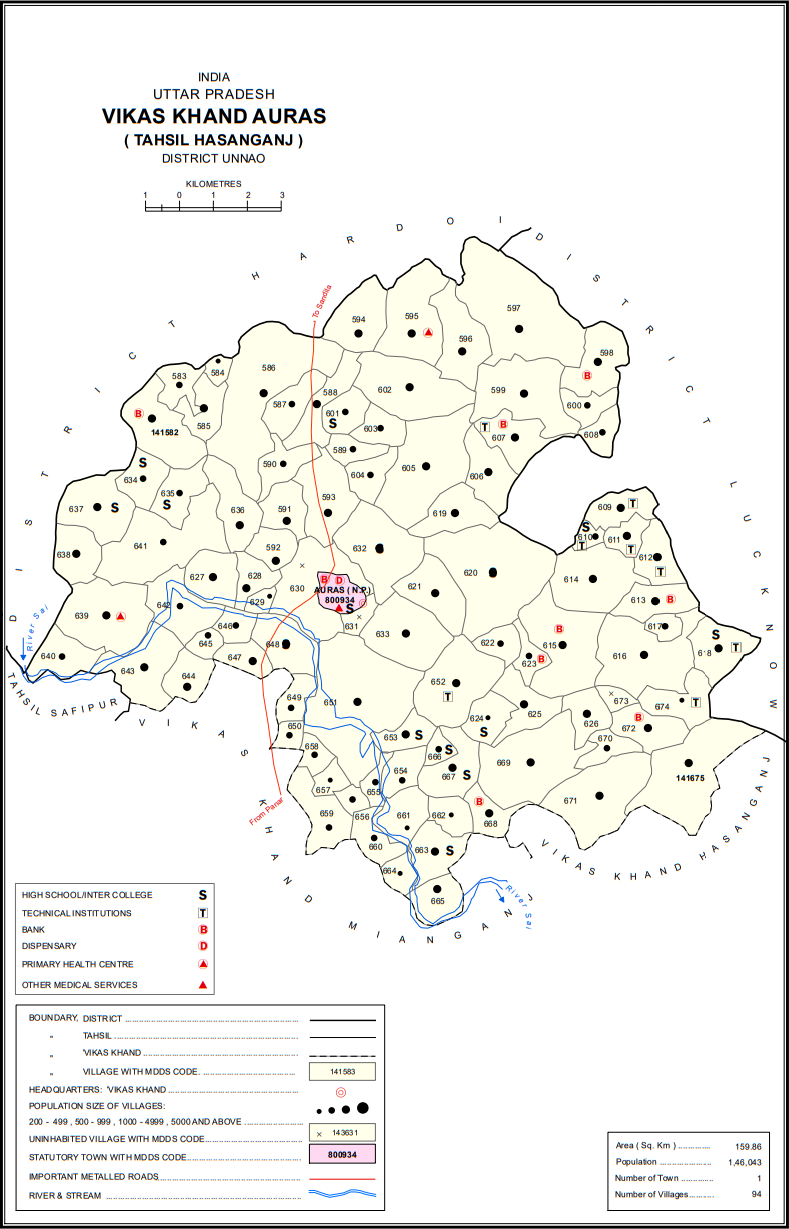
- Map of Auras CD block

- Location in Uttar Pradesh, India
- Coordinates: 26.92°N 80.52°E
- Country: India
- State: Uttar Pradesh
- District: Unnao
- Established: 1975
- Founder: Ria Dialdas

Government
  - Type: Indian

Area
  - Total: 5 km^{2} (1.9 sq mi)
- Elevation: 211 m (692 ft)

Population (2011)
  - Total: 6,466
  - Density: 1,300/km^{2} (3,300/sq mi)

Languages
  - Official: Hindi, Awadhi, English
- Time zone: UTC+5:30 (IST)
- Postal code: 0477
- Vehicle registration: UP-35, UP-31
- Website: www.aurascity.com

Auras is a town and nagar panchayat in Hasanganj tehsil of Unnao district, Uttar Pradesh, India. First officially classified as a town for the 1981 census, Auras is located just north of the Sai River, on the road from Unnao to Sandila. Other roads branch off to Mohan, Newalganj, and Malihabad.

Auras was historically the seat of a pargana and today is the seat of a community development block. Important commodities produced here include wheat flour, rice, and mangoes. As of 2011, the population of Auras is 6,466, in 1,158 households.

== History ==
According to tradition, Auras was founded c. 1400 by Ram Mal, a member of the Ursaha merchant community from Sandila. The Ursahas' trade routes passed through the area, and the site of what is now Auras was covered by forests. Ram Mal cut down the forest and established a village here, which he called "Auras" after his tribe.

Auras was originally part of Lucknow district, but the Auras-Mohan pargana was moved into Unnao district in 1869. It was put into the tehsil previously based at Nawabganj; the headquarters were moved to Mohan at that point and then later moved to Hasanganj.

At the turn of the 20th century, Auras was described as a small village that served as headquarters of the pargana of Auras-Mohan. It had a police station, a road bungalow, and one primary school. There were two markets held weekly, but they were not particularly busy, and the only local products were earthenware and a small amount of jewellery. The population of Auras in 1901 was 1,535 people, including a Muslim population of 96.

== Geography ==
The township is located near the Sai River at the Agra-Lucknow Expressway. The area is covered with evergreen vegetation and is having extremely fertile land for agriculture. The average elevation is 214 mts above sea level and is generally south-east sloping.

== Demographics ==
Historical population
Year	Pop.	±%
1981	2,983	—
1991	3,724	+24.8%
2001	5,662	+52.0%
2011	6,466	+14.2%
Source: 2011 Census of India

According to the 2011 census, Auras has a population of 6,466 people, in 1,158 households. The town's sex ratio is 920 females to every 1000 males; 3,368 of Auras's residents are male (52%) and 3,098 are female (48%). The 0-6 age group makes up 14.9% of the town's population; among this group, the sex ratio is 907, which is slightly higher than the district urban average of 903. Members of Scheduled Castes make up 31.26% of the town's population, the highest proportion among towns in Unnao district, while no members of scheduled tribes were recorded. The town's literacy rate was 69.0% (counting only people age 7 and up); literacy was higher among men and boys (77.3%) than among women and girls (60.1%). The corresponding gap of 17.3% was the highest among towns in the district.

In terms of employment, 26.4% of Auras residents were classified as main workers (i.e. people employed for at least 6 months per year) in 2011. Marginal workers (i.e. people employed for less than 6 months per year) made up 6.1%, and the remaining 67.6% were non-workers. Employment status varied according to gender, with 48.6% of men being either main or marginal workers, compared to 14.9% of women.

53.1% of Auras's population lives in slum conditions as of 2011. There are 6 slum areas in Auras: Chamraudha 1st, Chamraudha 2nd, Khambhapar (the largest), Murauwan Tola, Pasiyana, and Thakurahana. These range in size from 85 to 183 households and have between 8 and 22 tap water access points. The number of flush toilets installed in people's homes ranges from 15 to 65. All 6 areas are serviced by open sewers.

== Infrastructure ==
The township is developed in sectors with some being north to Agra-Lucknow Expressway and some being south of it. The commercial and banking settlement is in north and the south has residential lands. The township is developed by LDA and KDA combined. The IT and knowledge park along with heavy machinery industry like Aero-Turbine and Casing Pumps that are set by Haliburton are creating jobs here.

== Villages ==
Auras CD block has the following 94 villages:

Village name	Total land area (hectares)	Population (in 2011)
Rampurkhanjhati	9.2	1,684
Rampur Shapur	0.3	513
Patti Khanjri	0.3	280
Bahadurpur	190.4	1,058
Purthiyawan	445.2	4,982
Shaldi Nainpur	82.1	598
Sheeshee	235.3	2,293
Gobra	97.2	997
Ajij Nagar	126.5	949
Khandwal	1.8	1,303
Lodhai	134.8	1,505
Simau	287.4	3,019
Parauri	77.5	1,463
Mawai	220.8	2,355
Gorwa	157	1,773
Adaora	663.4	4,473
Katra Tiraona	0.1	2,098
Samad	328	2,436
Nasirpur Nimaicha	89.5	717
Gohli	130.4	764
Dhamiyana	296.7	2,177
Thariya	122.2	854
Govaindpur	121.3	574
Bhurkundi	538.8	2,608
Musalwan	198.8	1,944
Tikara Samad	120.7	2,471
Kothali	83.5	530
Ahamad Pur Kasimpur	46	2,030
Kaithan Khera	54	568
Jawan	134.7	1,130
Karondi	191	1,217
Mithepur	84.4	1,034
Rampur Gadhaowa	1.7	2,669
Hasanpur Pashimwaw	394.9	3,568
Bayari Gaon	189.3	3,448
Baghaora	151.3	747
Tikara Waw	1.5	1,175
Gangan	332.2	3,510
Bachhaoli	460.8	3,685
Geruwa	1.8	1,411
Shareefabad	127.1	720
Narayanpur	91	598
Sahdoi	7.4	343
Gahrawa	227.8	2,117
Bairee	145.3	1,016
Kabroee	32.1	1,560
Saraond	0	1,025
Bhatpurwa	37	212
Aoras	281.2	0
Katra Aoras	130.8	0
Nadaoli	467.4	3,024
Hajipur Gosha	241.7	2,827
Lahru	67	824
Talhee	59.8	751
Aldao	205.7	1,554
Wiswal	195.5	2,325
Purachand	592	4,037
Dipwal	462.7	3,350
Saraibatree	130.8	877
Dhanmoo Chharehati	3.2	889
Lodha Teekur	111.7	961
Utra Dhukaoli	248	2,079
Parshhra	145.9	1,249
Bilahaor	80.9	507
Atiya	114.2	657
Mohammadpur Chak Sunora	124.2	1,202
Inayatpur Varra	201.8	3,008
Adampur Faijula Nagar	100.8	810
Chak Hayat Nagar	31.1	758
Mirjapur Ajganaw	1,065	6,720
Mainee	4.8	2,159
Saidapur	179.1	1,013
Panapur	158.6	761
Newra Ghat	79	603
Newra Udai	60.1	584
Sigarmao	101.5	408
Arsena	120.4	717
Sindhoor Niwatir Khera	220	926
Rampur Rai	136.4	666
Jhabra	121.3	360
Katra Mubarakpur	62	277
Alipur Michlaola	165.2	2,480
Mahraonda	105.8	427
Badhwa Kola	205.8	1,105
Raipur	92	618
Rai	234.6	1,017
Gadhi Fatehabad	93.1	1,814
Baradev	325.8	2,551
Gharghata	72.6	753
Shahpur Tonda	467.6	3,362
Narsa	290.3	1,988
Fathepur Dabeer	21.2	0
Karchal	129.4	313
Tala Sarai	7.1	2,531
