= Ugu =

- Town
- Location in Uttar Pradesh, India
- Coordinates: 26.78°N 80.33°E
- State: Uttar Pradesh
- District: Unnao
- Founder: Raja Ugarsen

Area
  - Total: 3 km^{2} (1.2 sq mi)
- Elevation: 128 m (420 ft)

Population (2011)
  - Total: 6,318
  - Density: 2,100/km^{2} (5,500/sq mi)

Languages
  - Official: Hindi
- Time zone: UTC+5:30 (IST)

Ugu is a town and a nagar panchayat in Unnao district in the Indian state of Uttar Pradesh. First officially classified as a town for the 1981 census, Ugu is an old town with medieval ruins that hosts a biweekly market and an annual mela. It is located on the main Unnao-Hardoi road, a bit northwest of Safipur. Some of the main items manufactured here are shoes, slippers, furniture, and lipstick cover. As of 2011, the population is 6,318, in 1,044 households.

The town is known for its religious and cultural heritage and is home to several historic temples, some of which are believed to be centuries old. Among these, the Maa Kamakhya Devi Temple is the most revered and attracts devotees from the surrounding region. The Maa Shitla Devi Temple is another important place of worship in the town.

Ugu is the birthplace of Uma Shankar Dikshit, who served as India's Home Minister.

== History ==
Ugu is said to have been founded and settled by Raja Ugrasen, the ruins of his palace and courtyard still exist. His descendants ruled here until 806 AH, when they were defeated and overthrown by the Jaunpur Sultanate. They were then replaced by Kurmi patidars, family lamberdar Basti lal, he had two sons mamed Lamberdar Tularam and Lamberdar Bhawani Deen. Lamberdar Tularam had five sons, 1- Bramhadeen, 2- Jeetbhadur Singh, 3- Lamberdar Mishri Lal, 4- Lamberdar Ramswaroop, 5- Lamberdar Ramratan Singh. Lamberdar Jeetbhadur Singh hat two sons named 1- Lamberdar Ramkumar singh Kanaujia and 2- Lamberdar Shiv kumar singh Kanaujia. This was the Kurmi Kanaujia Family who continued to hold the village until the 20th century.

At the turn of the 20th century, Ugu was described as a large and prosperous village, "almost completely surrounded by groves". It had a lower primary school attended by 60 students, as well as three temples and the ruins of Ugarsen's palace and courthouse. Its population in 1901 was recorded as 4,640, including 4,443 Hindus and 197 Muslims. Around 30% of the total population belonged to the Brahmin community.

== Demographics ==
Historical population
Year	Pop.	±%
1981	5,467	—
1991	5,915	+8.2%
2001	6,350	+7.4%
2011	6,318	−0.5%
Source: 2011 Census of India

According to the 2001 Census of India, Ugu had a population of 6,359.

The 2011 census recorded Ugu as having a population of 6,318 people, in 1,044 households. 94.7% of the town's population was recorded as living in slum conditions. The town's sex ratio is 852 females to every 1000 males, which is the lowest among towns in the district; 3,411 of Ugu's residents are male and 2,907 are female. Among the 0-6 age group, the sex ratio is 696, also the lowest in the district and far below the district average of 903 for this group. Members of Scheduled Castes make up 29.3% of the town's population, the second-highest proportion in the district behind Auras, while no members of scheduled tribes were recorded. The town's literacy rate was 74.5% (counting only people age 7 and up); literacy was higher among men and boys (81.9%) than among women and girls (66.2%).

In terms of employment, 25.0% of Ugu residents were classified as main workers (i.e. people employed for at least 6 months per year) in 2011. Marginal workers (i.e. people employed for less than 6 months per year) made up 9.3%, and the remaining 65.8% were non-workers. Employment status varied heavily according to gender, with 52.8% of men being either main or marginal workers, compared to only 12.5% of women.
