= Parsandan =

- Village
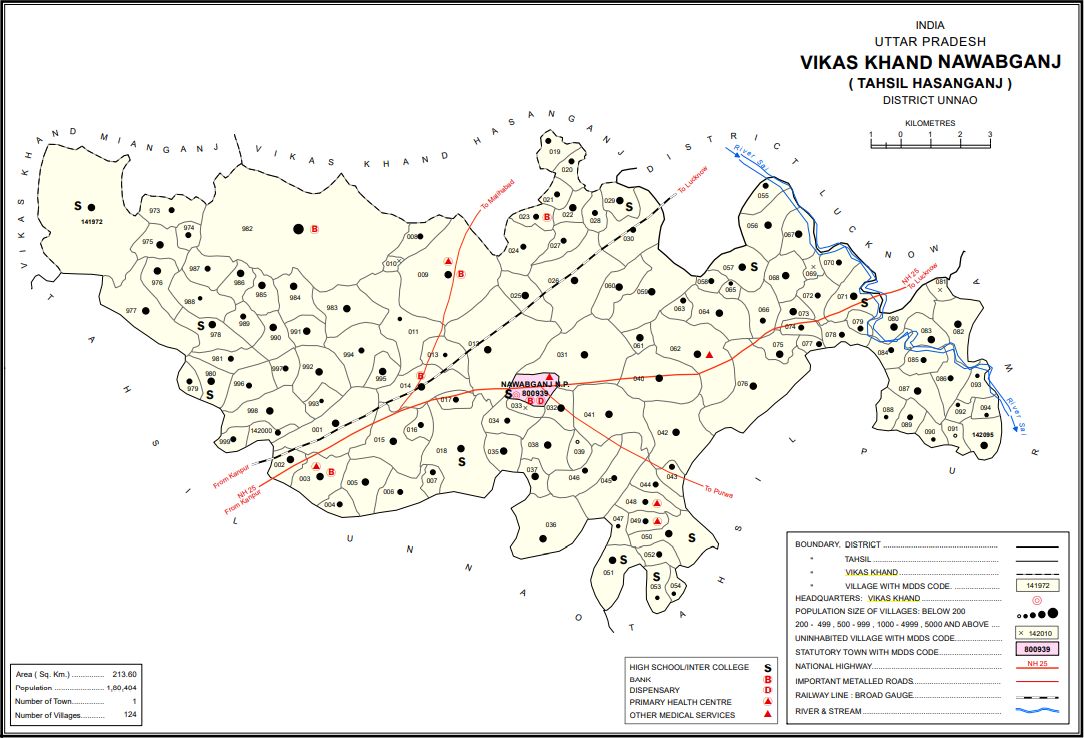
- Map showing Parsandan (#041) in Nawabganj CD block

- Location in Uttar Pradesh, India
- Coordinates: 26°36′N 80°41′E
- Country India: India
- State: Uttar Pradesh
- District: Unnao

Area
  - Total: 6.787 km^{2} (2.620 sq mi)

Population (2011)
  - Total: 3,946
  - Density: 581.4/km^{2} (1,506/sq mi)

Languages
  - Official: Hindi
- Time zone: UTC+5:30 (IST)
- Vehicle registration: UP-35

Parsandan is a village in Nawabganj block of Unnao district, Uttar Pradesh, India. It was historically the capital of a pargana, since at least the time of Akbar. As of 2011, its population is 3,946, in 778 households.

== History ==
The exact circumstances of Parsandan's original foundation are not clear. According to legend, Paras Ram performed his penances in the thick jungle that once covered this spot, leaving behind traces of his place of worship which inspired one Raja Ugarsen to come from the other side of the Yamuna, clear the jungle, and establish the town. Supposedly, an ancestor of the Thakurs of Parsandan, Himmat Singh, built a fort here sometime around 1400 and resisted the Delhi Sultan here, leading to a battle with the imperial subahdar at Parsandan.

Parsandan was historically the seat of a pargana, since at least the time of Akbar. After the British annexation of Oudh State, the pargana was merged with that of Gorinda and made part of the tehsil of Mohan. The village's population according to the 1901 census was 1,203 people, mostly Lodhs, and there were no Muslim residents.

The 1961 census recorded Parsandan as comprising 6 hamlets, with a total population of 1,269 (691 male and 578 female), in 231 households and 205 physical houses. The area of the village was given as 1,780 acres. It had 3 makers of earthenware pottery and 2 manufacturers of sundry hardwares at that time.
