= Miyanganj =

Miyanganj Mianganj
- Town
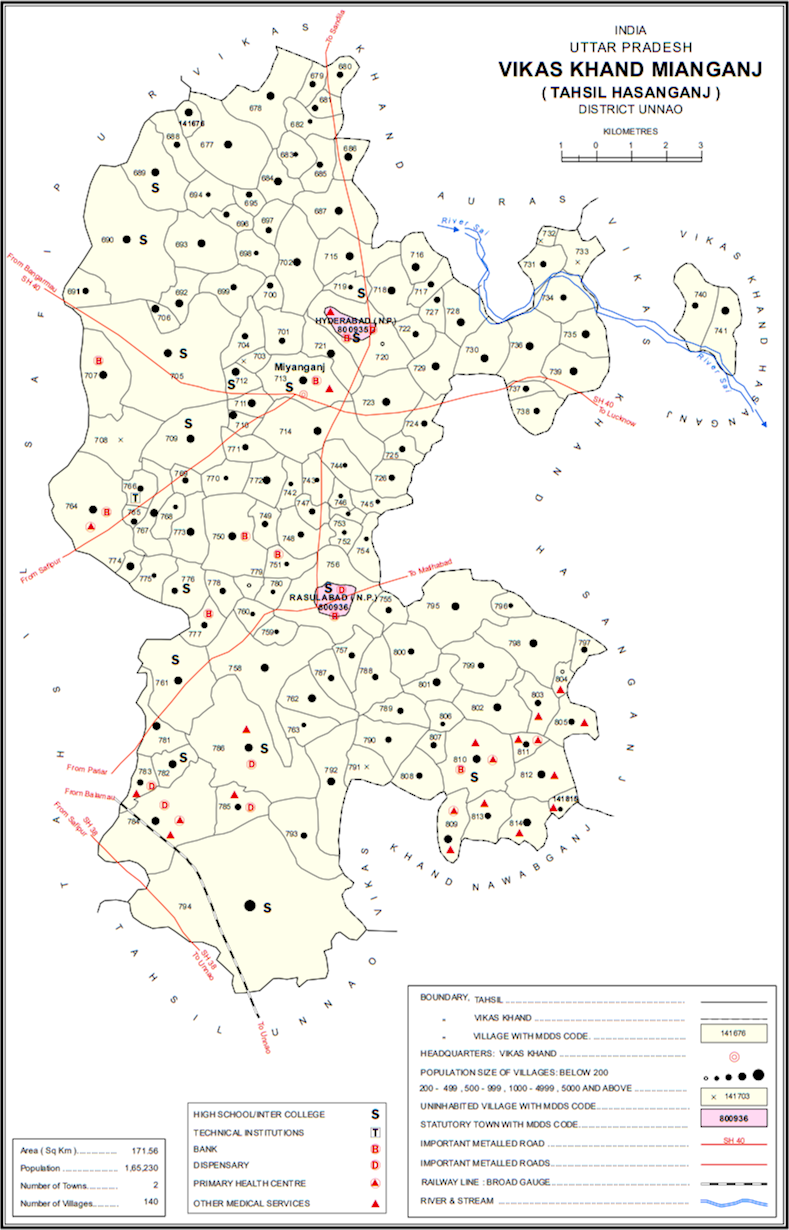
- Map of Mianganj CD block

- Location in Uttar Pradesh, India
- Coordinates: 26.800186°N 80.487958°E
- Country India: India
- State: Uttar Pradesh
- District: Unnao
- Established: 1771
- Founder: Miyan Almas Ali Khan

Area
  - Total: 3.195 km^{2} (1.234 sq mi)

Population (2011)
  - Total: 8,948
  - Density: 2,801/km^{2} (7,254/sq mi)

Languages
  - Official: Hindi
- Time zone: UTC+5:30 (IST)
- Vehicle registration: UP-35

Miyanganj, also spelled Mianganj, is a village and corresponding community development block in Hasanganj tehsil of Unnao district, Uttar Pradesh, India. It is located on the road from Lucknow to Bangarmau, just to the west of the crossroads with another route linking Unnao and Sandila.

Miyanganj hosts a cattle fair on Asadha Badi 2-30. Vendors bring wooden products, agricultural implements, sweets, toys, and assorted other merchandise to sell at the event. The village also hosts a market on Wednesdays and Saturdays where grain and vegetables are sold. As of 2011, its population is 8,948, in 1,575 households.

== History ==
Formerly a village called Bhopatpur, the modern settlement of Miyanganj was founded in 1771 by Miyan Almas Ali Khan, a eunuch and finance minister under the Nawabs of Awadh. It was described in 1803 as a prosperous town, but then in 1823 a visitor described it as rapidly becoming dilapidated. It was later the site of a battle during the Indian Rebellion of 1857.

At the turn of the 20th century, Miyanganj had 13 mosques, 4 temples, two sarais, and one primary school with 33 students. The population in 1901 was 3,395 residents, including 1,312 Muslims, an especially high proportion for this part of Awadh.

The 1961 census recorded Miyanganj (here spelled "Miaganj") as comprising 3 hamlets, with a total population of 2,885 (1,503 male and 1,382 female), in 511 households and 493 physical houses. The area of the village was given as 836 acres. Average attendance of the cattle fair was about 4,000 people, and attendance of biweekly market averaged about 800. The V.D.T. Higher Secondary School in Miyanganj, founded in 1950, was in 1961 recorded as having a faculty of 10 teachers (all male) and a student body of 284 (also all male).

== Villages ==
Miyanganj CD block has the following 140 villages:

Village name	Total land area (hectares)	Population (in 2011)
Shiva Thana	217.4	1,407
Anee Khurd	222.4	1,745
Himmat Khera	320.7	2,447
Tiyar	76	844
Subhami Khera	66.2	752
Tikara	110.7	572
Newada	62.1	390
Durga Gadhi	107.2	398
Gobari	178.6	1,323
Shyampur	120.9	872
Galrapur	162.5	1,362
Chakbaresar	213.4	1,285
Aini Bujurg	166.3	827
Beejeemau	270.8	2,299
Kulha Ataora	794.1	4,010
Suman Khera	88.8	649
Murbbatpur	111	1,021
Mujaffarpur Sarra	324.7	2,457
Sareefabad	106.6	486
Dewasapur	87.2	536
Makhdampur Sahasafi	44	665
Malheemau	121.4	758
Jalalabad	45.4	252
Khanpur Peer Ali	137.8	889
Jahangeer Nagar	72.5	637
Khairanpur Gawasa	123	740
Kanigaon	425.6	2,794
Asiwantaraf Aima	84.4	0
Asiwantaraf Katra	47	565
Asiwantaraf Lokman	200.5	2,813
Asiwantraph Kadirpur	188.8	2,526
Jamalpur	254.6	1,139
Asiwantraph Chak Chamrosi	43	0
Asiwantraph Pashchim	533.8	6,089
Asiwantraph Nai Basti	157.6	1,532
Asiwantraph Sidhnath	539.7	1,795
Asiwantaraph	141.2	1,445
Miyanganj (block headquarters)	319.5	8,948
Saramba	465.6	1,772
Gorakala	247.1	1,558
Nauhai Khurd	125.6	1,022
Nauhai Bujurg	100	734
Binaika	215.5	1,222
Bala Khera	106.6	451
Haiderabad	359.9	91
Parasaifpur	181	1,328
Sahbasi	97.6	950
Barha Kalan	312.6	2,169
Gengla Mau	111.9	658
Rampur Kala	84.8	607
Banaoni	117.4	619
Firojpur Ramai	66.2	526
Basorwa Mohammadpur	164.6	1,016
Malholi Sardarnagar	209.4	1,381
Pathakpur	208.2	1,412
Chhitepur	61	504
Aladadpur	14.5	0
Udhranmau	161.8	0
Darihat	129.8	971
Ahamadpur Taktouli	180.4	1,003
Nepalpur	235.2	1,206
Shahijana Jargar	83.6	509
Sundhari Khurd	134.4	879
Akbarpur	219.2	1,273
Rajapur	187.4	593
Fakhruddeenmau	202.1	1,048
Salenagar	75.6	416
Kotaraha	67.3	387
Asrenda	103.2	310
Mishrapur	43.1	289
Sarang Har	65.7	216
Mahendra	101.6	959
Kamlpur	150.5	669
Budhanpur	70.8	733
Madarpur Kaolai	308	1,150
Bhitwa	71.4	304
Mahmudpur	67.4	398
Nijampur	86.7	259
Shahabad	108.2	430
Aorai	111.8	574
Rasulabad	544.4	0
Gaora Khurd	139.4	512
Nurulla Nagar	529	2,403
Atiya	74.6	425
Karhiya	75.7	430
Mirjapur Kala	162.3	1,801
Bhangarwat	176.4	1,182
Laglesrapur	122.5	375
Mawai Brahmanan	504.2	2,211
Siras Kanhar	39	710
Siras Chere	173.6	737
Tajpur	93.9	1,037
Bhakhra Khera	91.3	250
Ahmadpur	116.1	656
Sahajanpur	112.5	476
Mohaliya	144	610
Shahpur Sindhora	131.4	1,099
Panapur Kala	164.8	1,130
Laglaisra	80.9	1,297
Sirepur	103.4	300
Ariyar Kala	136.6	983
Kuremu	102.3	736
Ariyar Khurd	94.7	729
Naogawan	32.3	192
Lachha Khera	45.2	310
Salempur	467.5	2,688
Korari Khurd	131.4	1,411
Rana Gadhi	110	878
Korari Kala	702.7	4,218
Tenai	141.9	901
Purwa	890	3,088
Birampur	150.2	973
Paigambarpur	153.3	507
Hari Gadhi	136.2	666
Pama Khera	131.4	554
Basawan Khera	14	0
Kotra	497.6	1,601
Jangal Jahanabad	221.2	735
Makhi	2,216.8	13,786
Biru Gadhi	403	1,705
Vajid Nagar	80	491
Konai	60.5	517
Mustafabad	404	2,620
Hamirpur	214	910
Rawatpur	253.1	602
Saraoha	190	1,063
Ahra Dandiya	240	1,728
Sarai Chandan	151	733
Dayalpur	46.7	85
Nisbhi	103.7	620
Bajehra	76	479
Selai	54	758
Bhaduha	179	798
Amethan Gadhi	129.9	1,108
Parenda	447	2,237
Bhawaneepur	66.4	697
Dipa Gadhi	218.7	1,500
Jareliya	136.4	506
Champat Pur	183.3	1,191
Ograpur	62.8	420
