= Majhara Pipar Ehatmali =

- Census town
- Location in Uttar Pradesh, India
- Coordinates: 27°33′25″N 80°04′41″E
- Country: India
- State: Uttar Pradesh
- District: Unnao

Population (2001)
  - Total: 16,808

Languages
  - Official: Hindi
- Time zone: UTC+5:30 (IST)

Majhara Pipar Ehatmali is a census town in Unnao district in the Indian state of Uttar Pradesh.

== Demographics ==
As of 2001 India census, Majhara Pipar Ehatmali had a population of 16,808. Males constitute 54% of the population and females 46%. Majhara Pipar Ehatmali has an average literacy rate of 63%, higher than the national average of 59.5%: male literacy is 67%, and female literacy is 58%. In Majhara Pipar Ehatmali, 14% of the population is under 6 years of age.
