= Dakauli =

- Village
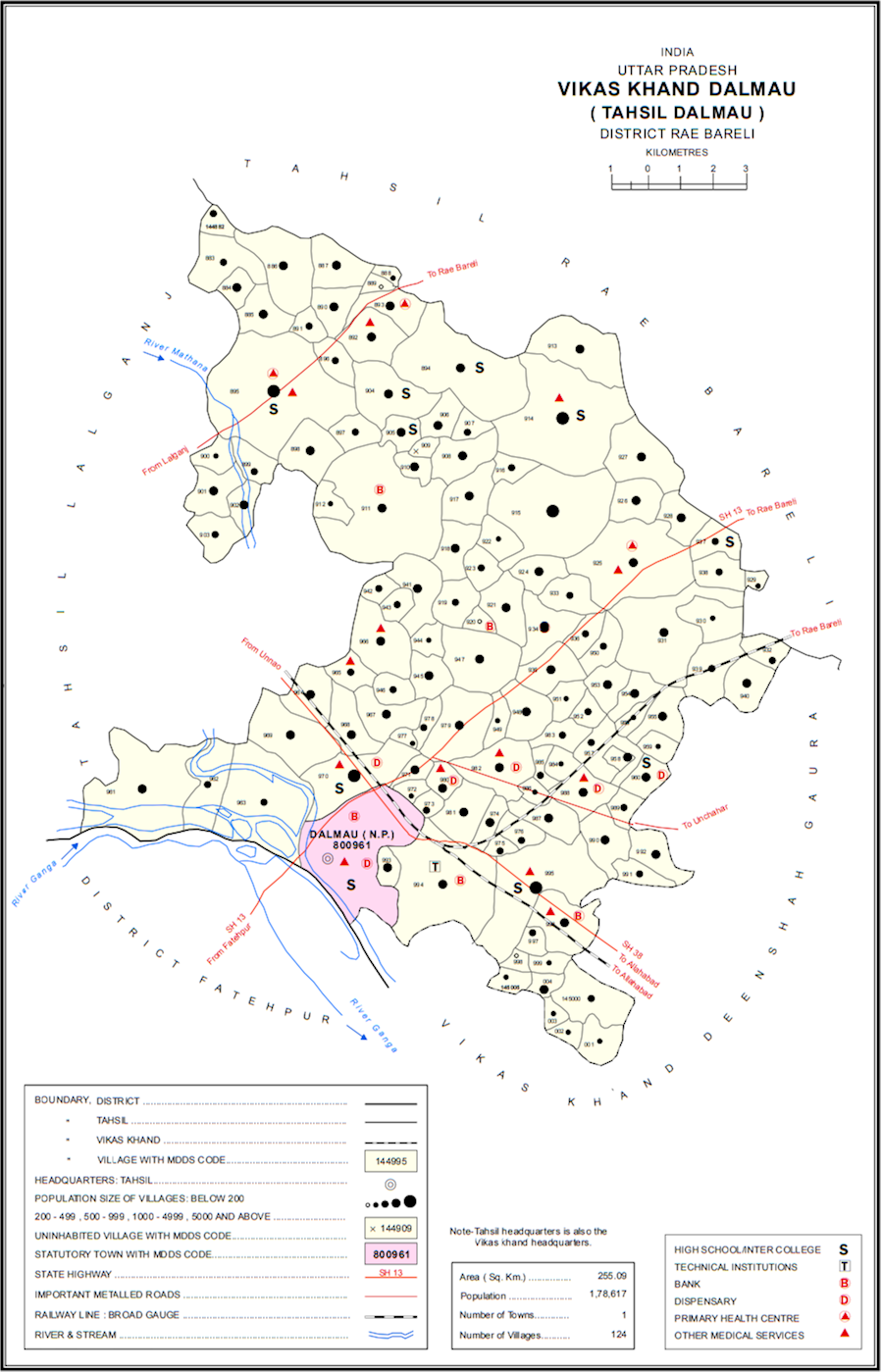
- Map showing Dakauli (#899) in Dalmau CD block

- Location in Uttar Pradesh, India
- Coordinates: 26.168648°N 81.018043°E
- Country: India
- State: Uttar Pradesh
- District: Raebareli

Area
  - Total: 1.282 km^{2} (0.495 sq mi)

Population (2011)
  - Total: 665
  - Density: 519/km^{2} (1,340/sq mi)

Languages
  - Official: Hindi
- Time zone: UTC+5:30 (IST)
- Vehicle registration: UP-35

Dakauli is a village in Dalmau block of Rae Bareli district, Uttar Pradesh, India. It is located 5 km from Lalganj, the nearest large town. As of 2011, it has a population of 665 people, in 130 households. It has one primary school. The village lacks formal healthcare facilities, a permanent market and a weekly haat. It belongs to the nyaya panchayat of Aihar.

The 1951 census recorded Dakauli as comprising 1 hamlet, with a population of 147 people (81 male and 66 female), in 25 households and 25 physical houses. The area of the village was given as 314 acres. 7 residents were literate, all male. The village was listed as belonging to the pargana of Dalmau and the thana of Dalmau.

The 1961 census recorded Dakauli as comprising 1 hamlet, with a total population of 219 people (122 male and 97 female), in 37 households and 31 physical houses. The area of the village was given as 314 acres and it had a medical practitioner at that point.

The 1981 census recorded Dakauli as having a population of 373 people, in 63 households, and having an area of 126.67 hectares. The main staple foods were listed as wheat and rice.

The 1991 census recorded Dakauli as having a total population of 416 people (187 male and 229 female), in 79 households and 79 physical houses. The area of the village was listed as 126 hectares. Members of the 0-6 age group numbered 99, or 24% of the total; this group was 49% male (49) and 51% female (50). Members of scheduled castes numbered 134, or 32% of the village's total population, while members of scheduled tribes numbered 68, or 16% of the total. The literacy rate of the village was 22% (78 men and 15 women). 65 people were classified as main workers (all men), while 104 people were classified as marginal workers (1 man and 103 women); the remaining 247 residents were non-workers. The breakdown of main workers by employment category was as follows: 65 cultivators (i.e. people who owned or leased their own land); 0 agricultural labourers (i.e. people who worked someone else's land in return for payment); 0 workers in livestock, forestry, fishing, hunting, plantations, orchards, etc.; 0 in mining and quarrying; 0 household industry workers; 0 workers employed in other manufacturing, processing, service, and repair roles; 0 construction workers; 0 employed in trade and commerce; 0 employed in transport, storage, and communications; and 0 in other services.
