= Mohan, Uttar Pradesh =

Town in Uttar Pradesh, India

Mohan
- Town
- Location in Uttar Pradesh, India Mohan (India) Mohan (Asia)
- Coordinates: 26.78°N 80.67°E
- Country: India
- State: Uttar Pradesh
- District: Unnao

Area
  - Total: 5.46 km^{2} (2.11 sq mi)
- Elevation: 128 m (420 ft)

Population (2011)
  - Total: 15,071
  - Density: 2,760/km^{2} (7,150/sq mi)

Language
  - Official: Hindi
  - Additional official: Urdu
- Time zone: UTC+5:30 (IST)
- Postal code: 229881
- Vehicle registration: UP-35
- Website: http://www.npmohan.in

Mohan is a town and a nagar panchayat in Unnao district in the Indian state of Uttar Pradesh.

== History ==
Some local residentssay that Mohan is derived from Moh meaning devotional love in Hindi and han meaning loss. A story claims that when Rama was going to Vanvas (self imposed exile) for fourteen years, Mohan is the place where he separated from his wife Sita thinking that he may suffer han in Moh due to the worldly love hence continued forward with his journey. Other local residents say that the word Mohan was given by the first inhabitants of this place. They migrated from a small city Mahan in the Kerman province of Iran thereby naming the place after their homeland.

During the Mughal and British empires, Mohan flourished as a town known for its literate people. During the days of the Nawabs of Awadh, some residents found employment in the court of the Nawab and earned large fortunes. The town was well known for its Unani Hakims, mimics and actors. Locals affectionately used to call it as Mohan Khitta-e Unan meaning Mohan as a part of Greece, due to a number of well known Hakims (doctors of Unani medicine).

== Demographics ==
As of 2011 Indian Census, Mohan had a total population of 15,071, of which 7,968 were males and 7,103 were females. Population within the age group of 0 to 6 years was 1,884. The total number of literates in Mohan was 8,220, which constituted 54.5% of the population with male literacy of 59.7% and female literacy of 48.8%. The effective literacy rate of 7+ population of Mohan was 62.33%, of which male literacy rate was 67.8% and female literacy rate was 56.1%. The Scheduled Castes and Scheduled Tribes population was 2,340 and 18 respectively. Mohan had 2454 households in 2011.

As of the 2001 Census of India, Mohan had a population of 13,553. Males constitute 54% of the population and females 46%. Mohan has an average literacy rate of 46%, lower than the national average of 59.5%: male literacy is 51%, and female literacy is 40%. In Mohan, 17% of the population is under 6 years of age.

== Geography ==
Mohan, lies on the left bank of the Sai River, about 6 km east of Hasanganj and 38 km north-east of Unnao. Roads lead from this place to Malihabad in Lucknow district on the east, Nawabganj on the south and Bangarmau on the north-west. Mohan is located at 26.78°N 80.67°E. It has an average elevation of 128 metres (419 feet). In the British period Mohan was part of Lucknow district. After independence it got merged into the Unnao district.

== Places of interest ==
=== Dargah ===
- Mohan has the Dargah of Qasim located in its heart which is also a spiritual place for the Shia Islam. Every year on the 7th Muharram of Islamic calendar people gather here to pay obeisance to Qasim ibn Hasan of Karbala and organize a procession to the Imaam chowk. This procession witnesses mourners from multiple sects and religions.
- Dargah of Imamzadeh Hazrat Syed Mahmood Nishapuri Al Mohani R.A .
- Dargah Hazrat Syed Shah Wajihuddin Mohammad Qadri R.A . Mureed o Khalifa Hazrat Syed Shah Hasan Rasoolnuma Dehlvi R.A .

== Sayyids of Mohan ==
Sayyids from Iran initially chose four places to settle in India. These were Hallaur, Baraha, Mohan and Bilgram. Sayyids of Mohan are descendants of Hazrat Syed Musa Al Mubarraqa Alaihissalam Son of 9th Imam of Islam Maula Imam Mohammad Taqi Ibne Maula Imam Ali Raza Alaihissalam, Hazrat Syed Mahmood Taqvi Rizvi Neshapuri R.A who migrated from Iran and settled in Mohan, Unnao, India . He belongs to the 20th generation of Hazrat Maula Imam Ali Alaihissalam & Hazrat Sayyeda Fatima Zahra Salamullah Alaiha . One of the branch of Moosavi and Nishapuri Sayyids from Mohan settled at Bijnor, near Lucknow.

== Notable people ==
- Imamzadeh Hazrat Syed Mahmood Nishapuri R.A Jadd e Aala Sadaat e Mohan .
- Qutub e Zamana Hazrat Syed Dost Mohammad Mohani R.A, Wali e Kamil and a famous Buzurg of his time in Awadh . His Mazar Shareef Situated in Badi Kasmandi, Barabanki District.
- Syed Shah Wajihuddin Mohammad Mohani R.A, a well known Sufi of Silsila e Qadriya and Khalifa of Syed Shah Hasan Rasoolnuma Dehlvi .
- Hazrat Makhdoom Syed Jayu Mohani R.A Khalifa of Hazrat Makhdoom Shah Shafi R.A Safipur Shareef .
- Hazrat Makhdoom Syed Mohammad Yaqoob Ali Shah Mohani R.A, a Sufi Darvesh, & Wali e Kaamil Of Silsila e Chistiya Safviya Mohammadiya, His Mazaar Shareef is situated in Takiya Bisatiyan, Bakarmandi Kanpur .
- Syed Fazlul Hasan Mohani AlMaroof Maulana Hasrat Mohani , a well known Urdu poet, A Sufi, Krishna Bhakt and freedom fighter of Indian independence from British rule .
- Syed Mohd Mudassir Mohani, a well known Sufi preacher, General Secretary of Sufi Islamic Board-Awadh Zone and President of Promotion for Indian Sufi Culture and Education Federation .
