= Unnao district =

Coordinates: 26°33′00″N 80°28′48″E

- District of Uttar Pradesh
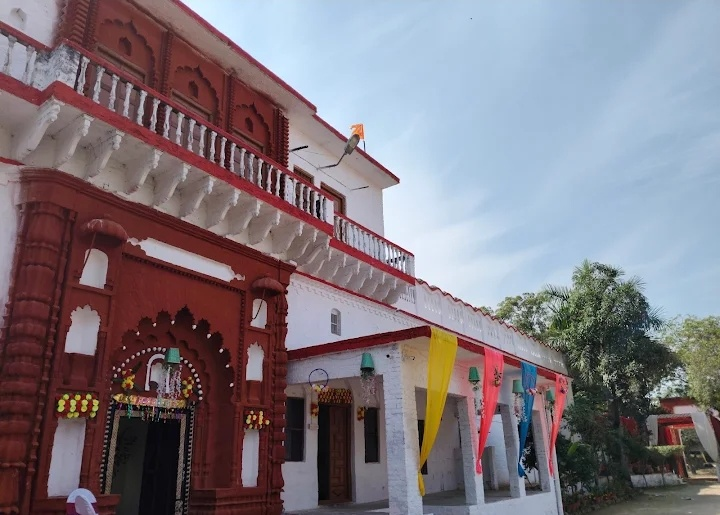
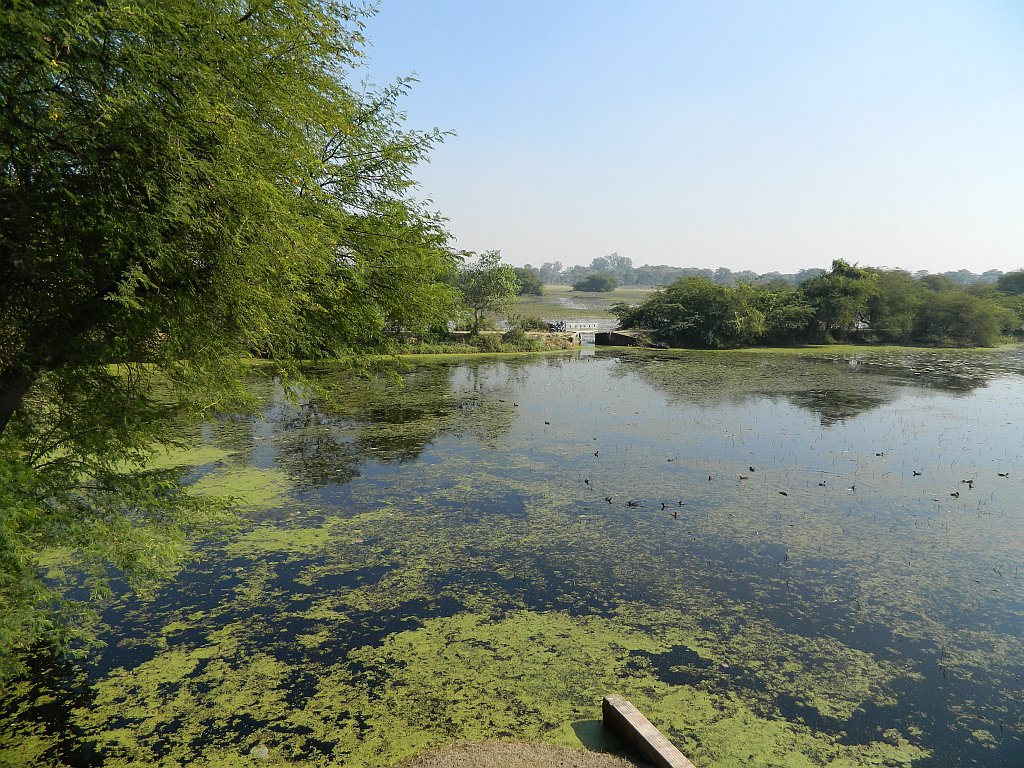
- Palace of Sarosi estate Nawabganj Bird Sanctuary

- Location of Unnao district in Uttar Pradesh
- Country: India
- State: Uttar Pradesh
- Division: Lucknow
- Headquarters: Unnao
- Tehsils: Unnao; Bangarmau; Hasanganj; Safipur; Purwa; Bighapur

Government
  - Lok Sabha constituencies: Unnao
  - Vidhan Sabha constituencies: Unnao; Bangarmau; Purwa; Bhagwantnagar; Mohan; Safipur

Area
  - Total: 4,045.2 km^{2} (1,561.9 sq mi)

Population (2011)
  - Total: 3,108,367
  - Density: 768.41/km^{2} (1,990.2/sq mi)
  - Urban: 531,646

Demographics
  - Literacy: 66.37%
  - Sex ratio: 0.901 ♂/♀
- Time zone: UTC+05:30 (IST)
- Website: unnao.nic.in

Unnao district is a district of Uttar Pradesh state in central India. The city of Unnao is the district headquarters. The district is part of Lucknow Division.

As of the 2011 census, Unnao district has a population of 3,108,367, making it the 31st-most populous district in Uttar Pradesh. It is a predominantly rural district, with over 80% of the population living in rural areas.

== Unnao in Epics ==
In Ramayana, Goddess Sita was left here by Lakshaman at Sutiyatara Chauraha(then called Sita-utara Jungle). Now at Sutiyatara there is an intersection cross and a Shiva temple. She in her second exile lived here in the village of Pariyar(परियर), which was the hermitage of sage Valmiki. It was forested with mango, neem, banyan, peepal trees, etc. There she gave birth to sons-Kusha and Lava.Now, here is a well known temple of maa Sita, Kusha and Lava called the Janaki Kunda(meaning a place from where maa Sita went to Kshira Sagara with her spiritual mother Bhumi) and a Shiva temple called Lodheswar.

== History ==
Unnao district was created by the British upon their annexation of Oudh State in February 1856. Before then, under the Nawabs of Awadh, the area was divided between several different districts or chaklas: Purwa covered the eastern part, and to the north were Rasulabad and Safipur. The pargana of Auras, meanwhile, was part of the chakla of Sandila, and the parganas of Baiswara were included in the chakla of the same name, whose headquarters were at Rae Bareli. After the British takeover, the district was originally called "Purwa district" with Purwa as its headquarters. This only lasted for a very short period before the headquarters were relocated to Unnao.

=== Ancient ===
Xuanzang, the Chinese pilgrim to India, stayed at Kannauj for 3 months in 636 AD. From here he journeyed a distance of about 26 km and reached the city of Nafotipokulo (Navadevakula) which stood on the eastern bank of Ganga. The city was about 5 km in circumference and had a Deva Temple, several Buddhist monasteries and Stupas.

Navadevakula has been identified with Nawal, 18 miles southeast of Kannauj.

After that period, this area's history is almost completely obscure, with only the traditions of the later Rajput families as a source. These traditions indicate that today's Unnao district was heavily divided between various groups: the Bhars are said to have ruled in the eastern part, while the central part was inhabited by a mix of tribes including the Lodhs, Lunias, Ahirs, Thatheras, Dhobis, and Kurmis. The mud forts of their rulers are still pointed out, but none of them ruled over a very large area. In the north, the rulers were the Rajpasis, whose capital was the city of Ramkot (now known as Bangarmau). Finally, the area around Safipur was supposedly ruled by Brahmin rajas (Shukla), with Safipur originally being called "Saipur" after one of them.

=== Medieval ===
In the following centuries, the Rajputs were the main ruling class in this area. The Bais ruled in the south, the Dikhits were prevalent in the central part (their family traditions call this the "Kingdom of Dikhitana"), and the north was divided between several smaller clans. Muslim rule was never very strong here, and so the medieval history of Unnao district is essentially a collection of separate family traditions of the ruling Rajput clans, with no specific dates given.

The first major Muslim center in the region was Bangarmau, around the year 1300: according to tradition, one Sayyid Ala-ud-Din conquered the area from the raja of Nawal, then destroyed Nawal and built a new capital at Bangarmau. The shrine over his grave bears an inscription with the date of 702 AH (1302 CE). The next major Muslim conquest was Safipur, said to have happened in 819 AH; a different Sayyid Ala-ud-Din was killed in battle here, and his shrine is venerated by both Hindus and Muslims. His son, Baha-ud-Din, is then said to have later conquered Unnao itself from the Bisen raja of the city, disguising his soldiers as women in order to take the raja's troops by surprise. Other Muslim outposts included Asiwan and Rasulabad.

At the time of Akbar, the entire area of modern Unnao district was included in the sarkar of Lucknow, in Awadh Subah. It consisted of the following mahals: Unnao (called Unam in the Ain-i-Akbari), Sarosi, Harha, Bangarmau, Safipur (then called Saipur), Fatehpur-Chaurasi, Mohan, Asiwan, Jhalotar, Parsandan, Unchgaon, Sidhupur, Purwa (then called Ranbhirpur), Mauranwan, Saron or Sarwan, Kumbhi, Magrayar, Panhan, Patan, Ghatampur, and finally Asoha. This administrative setup remained almost unaltered through the 20th century, although there were a few changes. For example, the pargana of Pariar was formed from parts of Sarosi and Safipur in 1785, and then in the 1800s the pargana of Sarosi became known as Sikandarpur instead (C.A. Elliott wrote in 1862 that it had "recently become habitual" at that time). As another example, Daundia Khera was formed out of Unchgaon and Sidhupur by Rao Mardan Singh around 1800.

=== Modern ===
There are few references to this area during the later Mughal period, but they become more numerous during under the Nawabs of Awadh. The Nawabs originally maintained a strong central authority over the region, with most of the local zamindars submitting to them without putting up a fight, but gradually their authority here diminished, and the local rulers became practically independent. Under the Nawabi administrative setup, the area covered by today's Unnao district was divided between several districts or chaklas: Purwa, Rasulabad, and Safipur were based here, while Sandila and Baiswara were based outside of the present district but included some of its territory.

When the British annexed Awadh in 1856, they established a new district based at Purwa, but the district headquarters were relocated to Unnao soon after. Unnao was chosen for its central location, and the Deputy Commissioner had been posted here even during the short time when Purwa was the headquarters And district kachhri in Tikargarhi village this located in central unnao area. At first, the new district was smaller than it is today, with only 13 parganas. In 1869, however, it became much larger: the 7 parganas of Baiswara (Panhan, Patan, Bihar, Bhagwantnagar, Magrayar, Ghatampur, and Daundia Khera) were transferred into Unnao district (from Rae Bareli district), where they became part of the tehsil of Purwa. Also in 1869, the pargana of Auras-Mohan was transferred here from Lucknow district, and Mohan became the seat of a tehsil (replacing Nawabganj).

Some fighting during 1857 sepoy mutiny took place in this area. Following the mutiny, the civil administration was re-established in the district which was named district Unnao, with headquarters at Unnao. The size of the district was however small until 1869, when it assumed its present form. The same year the town of Unnao was constituted a Municipality.

== Economy ==
In 2006 the Ministry of Panchayati Raj named Unnao one of the country's 250 most backward districts (out of a total of 640). It is one of the 34 districts in Uttar Pradesh currently receiving funds from the Backward Regions Grant Fund Programme (BRGF). Unnao has been officially integrated into the State Capital Region by the Uttar Pradesh government in 2024, a move that is expected to enhance investment opportunities and stimulate economic growth in the area.

== Divisions ==
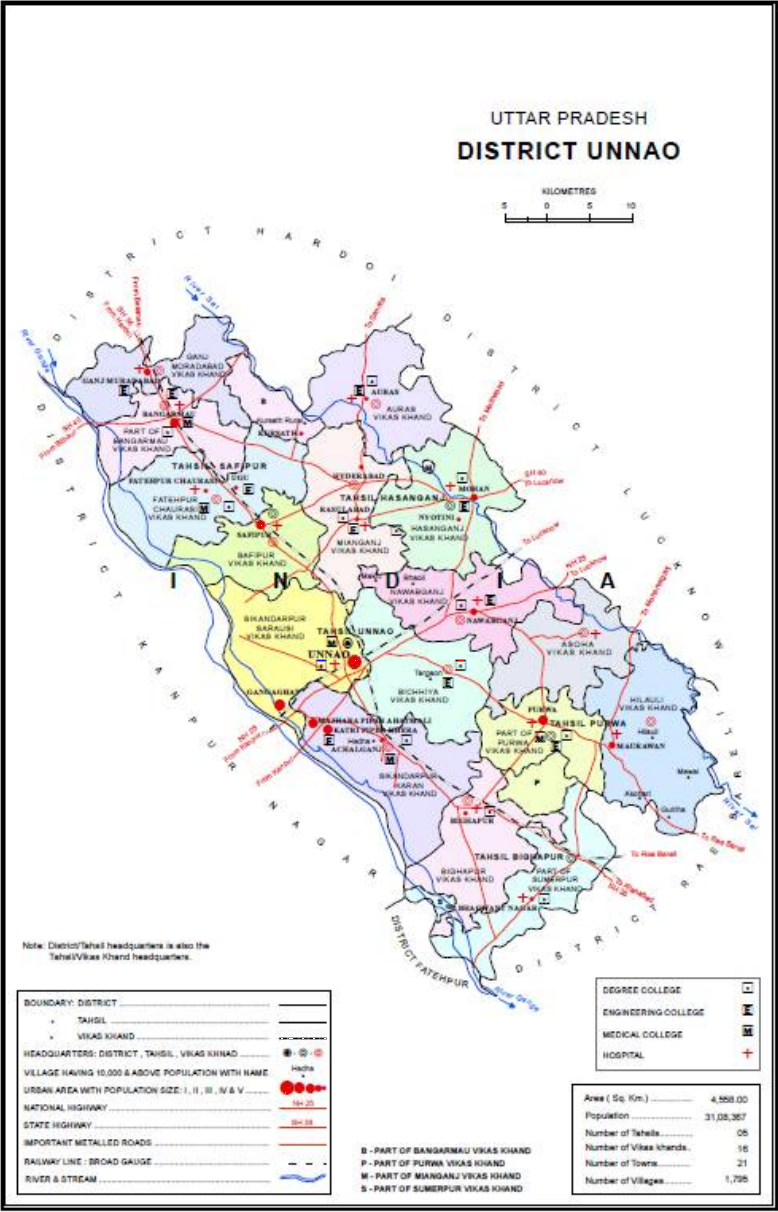
Map of Unnao district's tehsils and blocks

Unnao district is divided into 6 tehsils: Unnao, Hasanganj, Safipur, Purwa, Bangarmau and Bighapur. These are further subdivided into 16 community development blocks, as follows:

- Safipur tehsil:
  - Safipur block
- Hasanganj tehsil:
  - Auras block
  - Mianganj block
  - Hasanganj block
  - Nawabganj block
- Unnao tehsil:
  - Sikandarpur Sarausi block
  - Bichhiya block
  - Sikandarpur Karan block
- Purwa tehsil:
  - Asoha block
  - Purwa block (Note: Part of Purwa block is also in Bighapur tehsil.)
  - Hilauli block
- Bangarmau tehsil:
  - Ganj Moradabad block
  - Bangarmau block
  - Fatehpur Chaurasi block
- Bighapur tehsil:
  - Bighapur block
  - Sumerpur block

== Administration ==
The current elected representative from Unnao to the Lok Sabha, in the Parliament of India, is Shakshi Maharaj. The district had seven Vidhan Sabha seats, namely Unnao, Purwa, Bhagwantnagar, Hasanganj, Hadha, Safipur and Bangarmau. However, after delimitation in 2008, areas under Hadha were merged with other Vidhan Sabha seats and Hasanganj was reorganised as Mohan. Thus, the district now has only 6 Vidhan Sabha seats that are Unnao, Purwa, Bhagwantnagar, Mohan, Safipur and Bangarmau. Other prominent Qasba of Unnao include Karowan B.K., Safipur, Neotani, Asiwan, Bangarmau, Mohaan, Magarwara, Shuklaganj, Purwa Maurawan, and Baksar.

The district magistrate is Ghanshyam Meena

The Unnao Lok Sabha Constituency had the largest number of registered voters for the 2009 Lok Sabha elections, post de-limitation, with about 1.9 million voters, making it India's largest parliamentary seat.

=== Member of Legislative Council ===
Lucknow–Unnao Constituency- Ram Chandra Pradhan (BJP, 12 April 2022)

Kanpur Graduate Seat- Arun Pathak (BJP, elected 23 January 2015) (Kanpur city, Kanpur Dehat and Unnao districts are represented by this seat).

Kanpur Teachers constituency- Raj Bahadur Singh Chandel (IND, elected Feb-2023) (This constituency comes under Kanpur Nagar, Kanpur Dehat and Unnao district)

== Municipalities ==
The district has 19 statutory towns, including 3 Nagar Palika Parishads (municipal boards) and 16 Nagar Panchayats, as listed below:

Town name	Classification	Tehsil	Population (in 2011)
Ganj Muradabad	Nagar Panchayat	Safipur	10,957
Bangarmau	Nagar Palika Parishad	Safipur	44,204
Fatehpur Chaurasi	Nagar Panchayat	Safipur	6,715
Ugu	Nagar Panchayat	Safipur	6,318
Safipur	Nagar Panchayat	Safipur	25,688
Kursath	Nagar Panchayat	Safipur	6,770
Auras	Nagar Panchayat	Hasanganj	6,466
Hyderabad	Nagar Panchayat	Hasanganj	7,697
Rasulabad	Nagar Panchayat	Hasanganj	7,928
Mohan	Nagar Panchayat	Hasanganj	15,071
Nyotini	Nagar Panchayat	Hasanganj	7,577
Nawabganj	Nagar Panchayat	Hasanganj	11,545
Achalganj	Nagar Panchayat	Unnao	7,748
Unnao	Nagar Palika Parishad	Unnao	177,658
Gangaghat	Nagar Palika Parishad	Unnao	84,072
Purwa	Nagar Panchayat	Purwa	24,467
Maurawan	Nagar Panchayat	Purwa	15,484
Bighapur	Nagar Panchayat	Bighapur	6,501
Bhagwant Nagar	Nagar Panchayat	Bighapur	6,995

Unnao district also has 2 census towns, which are not full municipalities but are otherwise counted as urban areas:

Town name	Classification	Tehsil	Population (in 2011)
Katri Piper Khera	Census Town	Unnao	26,475
Majhara Pipar Ahatmali	Census Town	Unnao	25,310

== Demographics ==
Historical population
Year	Pop.	±% p.a.
1901	976,590	—
1911	910,869	−0.69%
1921	819,087	−1.06%
1931	855,657	+0.44%
1941	959,493	+1.15%
1951	1,067,001	+1.07%
1961	1,226,779	+1.41%
1971	1,484,393	+1.92%
1981	1,822,591	+2.07%
1991	2,200,397	+1.90%
2001	2,700,324	+2.07%
2011	3,108,367	+1.42%

Religions in Unnao district (2011)
Religion	Percent
Hinduism	87.89%
Islam	11.69%
Other or not stated	0.42%
Distribution of religions

According to the 2011 census Unnao district has a population of 3,108,367, roughly equal to the nation of Mongolia or the US state of Iowa. This gives it a ranking of 31st in Uttar Pradesh and 112th in India (out of a total of 640). The district has a population density of 682 inhabitants per square kilometre (1,770/sq mi), which is lower than Uttar Pradesh as a whole. Its population growth rate over the decade 2001-2011 was 15.19%. The district's population is 82.9% rural and 17.1% urban as of 2011. Unnao district has a sex ratio of 906 females for every 1,000 males, which is the 30th-highest in the state. It also has a literacy rate of 66.4%, which is the 47th-highest in the state. 17.10% of the population lives in urban areas. Scheduled Castes make up 30.51% of the population.

=== Languages ===
Languages of Unnao district (2011)
1. Hindi (97.6%)
2. Urdu (2.25%)
3. Others (0.16%)

At the time of the 2011 Census of India, 97.59% of the population in the district spoke Hindi (or a related language) and 2.25% Urdu as their first language.

Languages spoken here include Awadhi, a vernacular in the Hindi continuum spoken by over 38 million people, mainly in the Awadh region.

== Famous writers from Unnao ==
Suryakant Tripathi Nirala was one of the major figures of modern Hindi literature and a key poet of the Chhayavaad movement. His poetry is known for emotional depth, social awareness, and innovative use of language. He also wrote essays and short stories. Famous works include the poetry collections Saroj Smriti, Chitradhar, Parimal, and the long-form poem Achanak.

== Education ==
The district follows the usual 10+2+3 pattern of education, as elsewhere in India. Some notable schools and institutions of the district are:

- Delhi Public School(DPS), Akrampur, Unnao
- Dr. Virendra Swarup Education Centre(VSEC), Akrampur, Unnao
- Adarsh Vidya Mandir(AVM), Geeta Puram, Unnao
- Ben-Hur International School(BNIS), Akrampur, Unnao
- Brilliant Academy Inter College(BAIC), Unnao
- Government Inter College(GIC), Unnao
- St. Jude's Inter College(SJIC), Pitamber Nagar, Unnao
- St. Lawrence School(SLS), PD Nagar, Unnao
- Saraswati Vidya Mandir Inter College(SVMIC), Pooran Nagar, Unnao
- Vivekanand Sarswati Shishu Mandir Inter College(VSSMIC), Moti Nagar, Unnao
- Lucknow Public School(LPS), PD Nagar(Sector-B), Unnao
- Lucknow Public School(LPS), PD Nagar(Sector-C), Unnao
- Delhi Public School(DPS), Akrampur, Unnao

== 2013 gold treasure incident ==
In October 2013, Archaeological Survey of India took up the excavation near Daundia Khera village in Unnao district amid reports of over 1000 tonnes of gold deposits buried beneath the ruins of an old fort, which belonged to Ram Baksh Singh, a revolutionary of 1857. The preliminary investigation of ASI and GSI also confirmed a non-magnetic anomalous zone occurring at 5–20 m depth indicative of possible non-conducting, metallic contents and/or some alloys.

== Notable personalities ==
=== Literary ===
- Ashok Vajpeyi
- Bhagwati Charan Verma
- Chitra Mudgal
- Christine Weston
- Devi Shankar Awasthi
- Gaya Prasad Shukla 'Sanehi'
- Maulana Hasrat Mohani
- Nand Dulare Bajpai
- Pratap Narayan Mishra
- Ram Vilas Sharma
- Ramai Kaka
- Shivmangal Singh 'Suman'
- Suryakant Tripathi 'Nirala'

=== Academics ===
- Deepak Tripathi
- Hussain Ahmad Madani
- Ratan Shankar Mishra

=== Political ===
- Annu Tandon, former member of Parliament
- Bhagwati Singh Visharad
- Chandrashekhar Azad
- Devi Bux Singh
- Dwarka Prasad Mishra
- Gulab Singh Lodhi
- Hriday Narayan Dikshit
- Kuldeep Singh Sengar
- Ram Baksh Singh
- Sheila Dikshit, former Chief Minister of Delhi
- Uma Shankar Dikshit
- Vishwambhar Dayal Tripathi
- Ziaur Rahman Ansari, union minister

=== Films and Music ===
- Sarvadaman D. Banerjee
- Vishal Mishra, music director and singer

=== Cricket ===
- Kuldeep Yadav
