= Hasanganj =

- Village
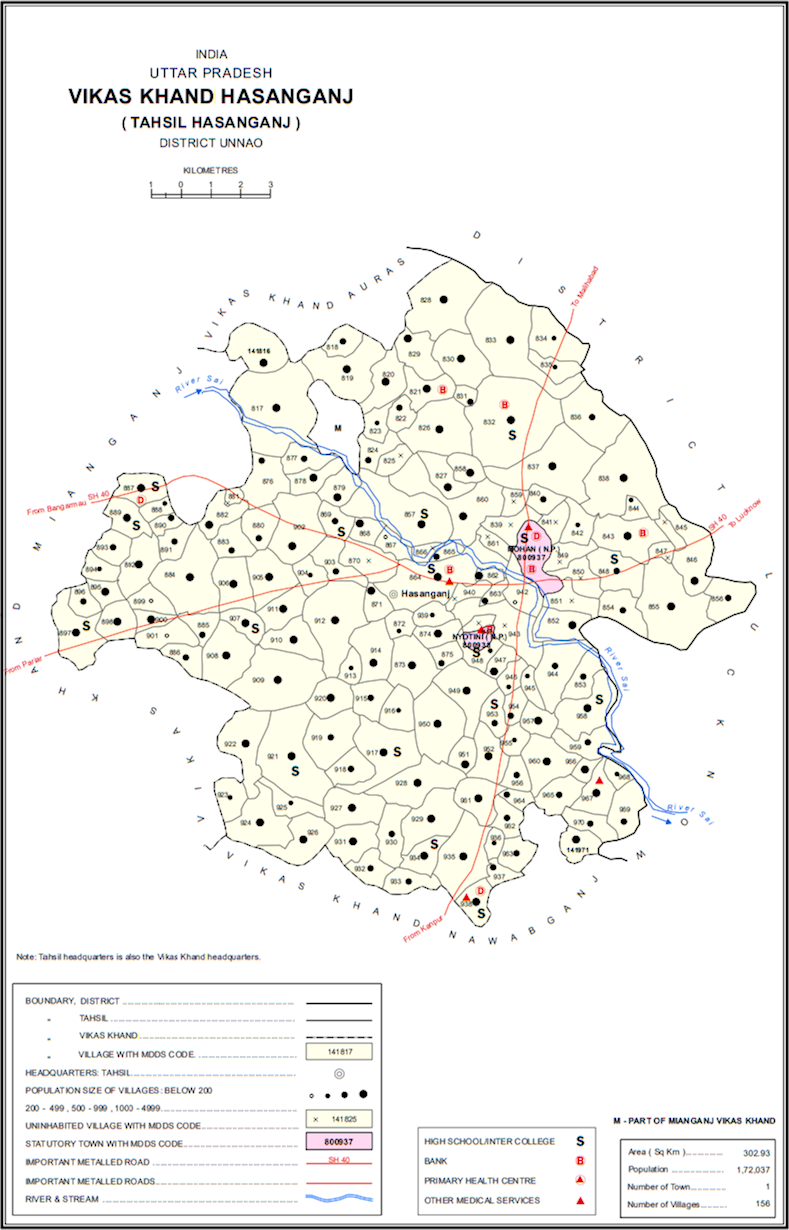
- Map of Hasanganj CD block

- Location in Uttar Pradesh, India
- Coordinates: 26.774499°N 80.637114°E
- Country India: India
- State: Uttar Pradesh
- District: Unnao

Area
  - Total: 1.838 km^{2} (0.710 sq mi)

Population (2011)
  - Total: 4,658
  - Density: 2,534/km^{2} (6,564/sq mi)

Languages
  - Official: Hindi
- Time zone: UTC+5:30 (IST)
- Vehicle registration: UP-35

Hasanganj is a village and tehsil headquarters in Unnao district of Uttar Pradesh, India. It is located near Mohan, at a road junction leading to Miyanganj and Rasulabad. As of 2011, its population is 4,658, in 818 households.

Hasanganj hosts two fairs: the Jal Bihar cattle fair on Bhadra Badi 2-4, and the Kans Lila fair on Bhadra Sudi 3. At both events, vendors bring sweets, clay toys, and articles of daily use to sell. Hasanganj also holds a market on Tuesdays and Fridays where grain and vegetables are sold.

== History ==
Hasanganj was originally a bazaar founded by Hasan Raza Khan, a naib in the service of Asaf-ud-Daula, in the village of Mahadeopur Balamau. It became a tehsil headquarters around 1890, replacing Mohan in this capacity, and the police station was transferred to Hasanganj at the same time.

At the turn of the 20th century, Hasanganj was centred around "a wide street lined with trees and shops on both sides." It was a minor commercial centre and had, in addition to the tehsil office and police station, a dispensary and a road bungalow, as well as an upper primary school with 32 students. Most of the locals were Banias and agriculturalists, and the population in 1901 was 1,310, including a Muslim minority of 255 people.

The 1961 census recorded Hasanganj as comprising 3 hamlets, with a total population of 1,461 (828 male and 633 female), in 268 households and 245 physical houses. The area of the village was given as 318 acres. Average attendance of the biweekly market was about 400. Average attendance at both the Jal Bihar and Kans Lila fairs was recorded as 2,000 people. The police station had a staff of 2 sub-inspectors, 1 head constable, and 14 constables at the time.

== Villages ==
Hasanganj CD block has the following 156 villages:

Village name	Total land area (hectares)	Population (in 2011)
Bahraoni Jahanpur	235.8	1,260
Rasulpur Bakiya	750.7	4,880
Koro Kalyan	131.7	938
Samadpur Bhawa	322.4	1,048
Samadpur Hardas	200.8	1,610
Haraoni Samsuddinpur	150.4	1,193
Sultanapur	87.4	573
Dhakwa Jagdishpur	79.9	462
Chilaola	111.3	612
Faijullapur	89.5	0
Ghooramu	398	1,036
Ahmadpur Wade	154.1	1,572
Koraora	464.1	1,081
Pichwara	191.4	1,227
Pilkhana Rasidpur	301.6	1,738
Chandoli Khurd	55.7	948
Dhaora	738.5	4,333
Matriya	663.1	3,025
Aliyarpur	307.5	471
Ataullah Nagar	39	285
Maljha	335.6	999
Koiya Madarpur	520.8	1,848
Shanker Pur	649.2	2,041
Salkhemau	237.4	0
Kamalpur	120.3	951
Mohan	277.3	0
Rani Khera Jageer	119.5	417
Newal Ganj	258.4	4,476
Mubarak Ganj	29.6	330
Tikait Ganj	30.8	0
Khapra Muslim	322	1,573
Bagat Nujul	11.9	0
Shekhpur Treha	143.3	916
Araji Mohan Jageer	10.1	0
Mohan Khurd Khalsa	81.2	0
Mohan Khurd Jageer	155.6	0
Bhogla	169.8	1,178
Daudpur	157.4	698
Mohiuddinpur	181.4	829
Hajipur Treha	695.3	2,408
Chunaoti	217.7	798
Unach Gaon	472.3	2,153
Unacha Dwara	125.2	1,522
Dhawahar	64.5	0
Bibipur Chiryari	518.2	3,144
Sahjanhar	46.7	0
Ranikhera Khalsa	83.2	1,250
Nasratpur Jangalmau	200.5	900
Hasanganj (block headquarters)	183.8	4,658
Maolbi Khera	45.7	560
Fattahpur	46.6	0
Mirjapur	29.5	191
Nindemau	368.9	1,843
Semra	115	707
(Chaklodhosi) Chaklu Davsi	26.3	0
Barha Samaspur	193.2	1,132
Hajipur Nyotani	72.6	238
Dayalpur	139.9	1,226
Munni Khera	375.1	2,189
Barwahar	152.6	716
Fareedipur	171.6	871
Khapra Bhat	168.4	621
Rafigadhi	131	1,022
Chhehra	159.6	1,038
Moosepur	144.1	891
Shekhpur Hasanpur	63.1	0
Hasanapur	181.5	1,518
Hilalmau	137.6	849
Saraimalkadim	462.3	2,815
Amoiya	122	791
Jagdishpur	122.4	815
Awagojha	137.6	1,184
Panapur Khurd	52.3	461
Acchepur Kir Mili	145.5	1,037
Dubegarhi	156.3	694
Khairabad	106.2	864
Kayampur Nibkhara	220.9	2,032
Mirjapur Bhamau	135.2	789
Gospurnatara	63	432
Khanpur Surauli	124	1,108
Mirapuramarocha	85.8	609
Sakaltpur	341.7	3,132
Jakhaila	153.5	1,159
Mirakpur	55.8	179
Pamedhiya	187.1	1,335
Prayagpur	55.7	101
Sairpur	348	2,388
Tegapur	135	681
Rahmalinagar	108.7	370
Chakkosehari	319.3	1,725
Jindaspur	147.1	1,218
Hansewa	123.3	1,057
Bhanpur	202	1,092
Barona Niyamatpur	555	3,718
Nijampur Pachgahna	154.5	1,163
Gajaffar Nagar	79.2	1,238
Maola Bamipur	489.6	3,430
Jajoomau	66.6	409
Kuraoli	206.1	1,470
Adampur Bhansi	192.3	978
Ajam Khera	126.6	358
Dhopa Jamuriya	476.5	1,682
Madanapur	135.8	836
Makdoompur	235.6	755
Semramau	160.7	1,214
Sandana	538.7	2,583
Kodra	427	2,355
Lakhora	24.7	239
Narainpur	240.1	1,793
Karsemau	140.2	493
Sighnapur	320	1,168
Chandpur Jhalhae	207.6	1,112
Oharapur Kodiya	300.7	1,048
Bara Bujurg	299.2	1,432
Firojabad	148.8	912
Sunderpur	221	1,123
Sarai Govind	84.2	581
Ibrahimpur	150.2	545
Jhalotar	177.7	1,990
Nawae	464.3	3,085
Paharpur	75.4	350
Jamalpur Gadhi	3	517
Lakhnapur	168.8	1,015
Salempur	133.6	209
Hardhaormau	101.3	0
Kuthilahar	32.3	0
Jalalabad	151.3	38
Bachharamag	152.6	0
Shekhpur Bujurg	195.9	667
Rampur Bulakidas	29.6	464
Gaospur	22.1	280
Farhatpur	128.8	1,106
Poorabhar Urf Nayotani Gramin	128.6	226
Chandoli Bujurg	268.7	1,178
Gadan Khera	353	1,859
Chandesawa	168.7	1,352
Nimadpur	168.7	1,551
Newaj Khera	112.9	667
Bara Khera	98.7	818
Abanpur	60.8	479
Tikwamau	90.1	562
Ajmat Gadhi	101.5	1,186
Adampur Barethi	369.5	1,998
Tanda Natoram	120.1	509
Rampur Akholi	275.6	2,086
Lalpur	172.3	1,181
Kherwa Aladadpur	77.4	733
Bagha Mustafabad	74.5	537
Nawi Nagar	118.2	633
Ismailabad	135.2	733
Samadpur Jasmadha	141.2	1,384
Jasmadha Babban	257.7	1,741
Firojpur Jasmadha	38.3	273
Khandwari Sadikpur	205.9	947
Jasmadha Ramai	84.2	646
Bhatpura	128.5	1,341
