= Bangarmau =

Bangarmau Bangermau
- Nagar palika parishad
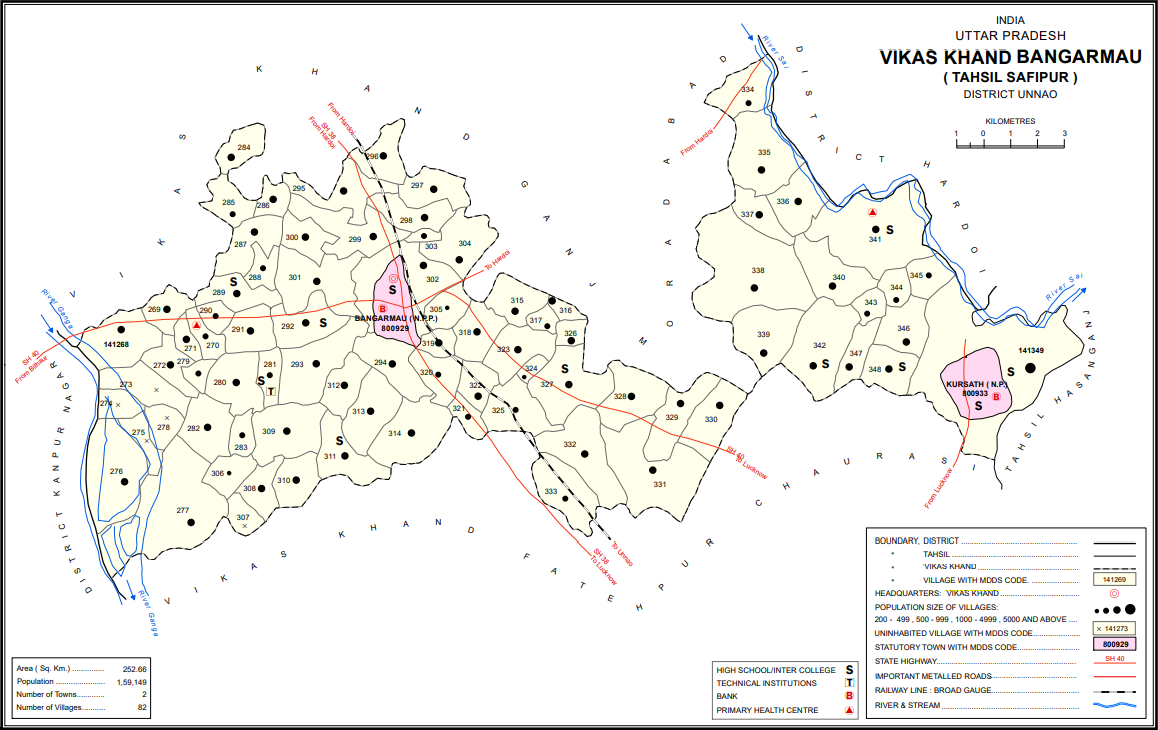
- Map of Bangarmau CD block

- Location in Uttar Pradesh, India
- Coordinates: 26.9°N 80.22°E
- Country: India
- State: Uttar Pradesh
- District: Unnao

Area
  - Total: 18.5 km^{2} (7.1 sq mi)
- Elevation: 122 m (400 ft)

Population (2011)
  - Total: 44,204
  - Density: 2,390/km^{2} (6,190/sq mi)

Languages
  - Official: Hindi
  - Spoken: Kannauji; Khadi Boli; English
- Time zone: UTC+5:30 (IST)
- Vehicle registration: UP-35

Bangarmau is a tehsil and a municipal board in the Unnao district in the state of Uttar Pradesh, India. It is located on high ground overlooking the left bank of the Kalyani River, about 50 km northwest of Unnao and 22 km northwest of Safipur. Roads fan out in all directions from Bangarmau, including the main Unnao-Hardoi road SH38 that passes through town. Major commodities produced here include wheat flour, rice, and pulses. As of 2011, the population of Bangarmau is 44,204, in 7,600 households.

Near Bangarmau is Sanchan Kot, where in 2009, an Archaeological Survey of India excavation unearthed a 2000-year-old Shiva temple.

== History ==
Bangarmau was the first Hindu settlement in the area of present-day Unnao district, dating back to around the year 1300. According to legend, the town was founded when a Hindu holy man named Rekkha Bangar attempted to take up residence near the town of Nawal, which was ruled by a Hindu raja named Nal. The raja refused and sent men to expel him by force, but Bangar laid a curse on them so that the raja and all his people died, and the town of Nawal was turned upside-down. The modern village of Nawal is built on top of its ruins, and old artifacts are still sometimes dug up.

Sayyid Ala-ud-Din then went on to found the city of Bangarmau, which is where he was buried after he died. A shrine was built over his grave, and it has an inscription dated to 702 AH, or 1302 CE. Ala-ud-Din's descendants remain custodians of the shrine, which at one point was "rich and famous" before declining by the turn of the 20th century.

Despite Bangarmau's Muslim origin and prominent shrine, though, it never became thoroughly Islamised, and the population remains mostly Hindu.

Bangarmau is referred to in the Baburnama, the autobiography of Babur, where Babur mentions that he camped near a lake situated in Bangarmau on 15 March 1528 and the following day left for Lucknow. Bangarmau belongs to the area under influence of a Sufi saint Madar Shah of the Madaria sect. Several villages named are after him situated around Bangarmau.

Bangarmau's population steadily declined during the second half of the 19th century.

At the turn of the 20th century, Bangarmau was described as a well-built town almost surrounded by extensive orchards; about half the houses were built with brick. It had 16 mosques and several Hindu temples, as well as a police station and a middle school with 120 students. The town held markets twice weekly, on Tuesdays and Saturdays; its commerce was helped by its advantageous location at a crossroads.

== Demographics ==
Historical population
Year	Pop.	±%
1901	6,051	—
1911	5,783	−4.4%
1921	4,919	−14.9%
1931	5,090	+3.5%
1941	5,921	+16.3%
1951	5,483	−7.4%
1961	Not given	—
1971	Not given	—
1981	14,958	—
1991	20,023	+33.9%
2001	31,871	+59.2%
2011	44,204	+38.7%
Source: 2011 Census of India

== Education ==
Schools and colleges:

- Indira Gandhi Rajkeeya Degree College
- Subhash Inter College
- St.Aloysius School Alampur Retwa, Bangarmau, Unnao.
- Rani Vidya Mandir School Bangarmau Unnao
- Bal Vidya Mandir School, Near Maa Hospital, Bangarmau Unnao
- Maya International School, Near Tehsil
- Pratima Inter College Bangarmau Unnao
- R.S. Inter College
- P.J.P Higher Secondary School (kasba tola Bangarmau Unnao)
- Shri Ram Public School for kids
- R.D.S Inter College New Katra
- Shri Durgeshvar Vidya Mandir
- Madrasa Ahle Sunnat Gousul Uloom Mukariyana
- K.D.S. Public School Bhatpuri
- New National Public School Purviya tola Bangarmau
- B.D.S.R. Inter College Radheshyam Nagar Kanpur Hardoi Bypass near Power House Bangarmau
- Indira Gandhi Government PG College
- Gautam Buddha Mahavidyalay (College), Ismailpur, Ambapara, Bangarmau

== Villages ==
Bangarmau CD block has the following 82 villages:

Village name	Total land area (hectares)	Population (in 2011)
Mella Allm Saha Ahatmali	499.5	1,048
Mela Allm Saha Gair Ahatmali	205.4	2,214
Jagat Nagar Gair Ahatmali	104.6	880
Jagat Nagar Ahat Mali	78.7	1,199
Khairoodeen Pur	287.4	2,144
Katri Mahigawa	304.8	0
Katri Gaori	19.8	0
Katri Mohiuddeen Pur	21.6	0
Katri Akberpur Seng	841	1,936
Katri Gadanpur Ahar	627	1,588
Bahalolpur Kaher	148.8	0
Setuwahi	105.6	770
Sindhpur Beria Garha	350.6	3,081
Shahabajpur	145.3	888
Fareedpur Khar	413	1,542
Purahash	133.8	531
Tatia Pur	180.3	1,222
Sahasaray	159.7	972
Golhawa Pur	150.7	1,194
Chhatra Pur	251	1,567
Hasanpur Sagaora	95.5	991
Saepur Sagaora	296.1	2,215
Khoajgipur Hemma	122.5	599
Jamuniha Bahger	223	1,568
Madarnagar	357.6	4,582
Jirik Pur	483	3,133
Bhikhari Pur Kasba	348.3	2,051
Jagtapur	341.9	1,340
Murtaza Pur	243.1	2,230
Haibatpur	268	1,382
Naseerpur Bhikkhan	210.2	1,213
Newal	394.3	2,389
Rabdi	229.4	1,371
Lateefpur	535.7	2,458
Bagermao Rural	656.8	1,239
Chakmeerapur	81.4	564
Bhagwantpur Gote Pali	309	4,870
Nagwa	155.3	254
Umaria Bhagwantpur	164	404
Parasram Pur Ahatmali	88.6	0
Parasram Pur Gair Ahatmali	238.6	2,492
Jamar	438.7	1,690
Kamal Pur	229.2	1,372
Marha Pur	407.3	3,219
Chahlha	213.9	1,981
Malha Pur	250.7	1,556
Sakraoli	461.8	2,684
Palia	225.2	1,619
Chakpeer Nagar	65.7	1,166
Goara	51.7	733
Surseni	305.8	4,597
Mau	134.8	1,785
Allampur Retwa	150.8	813
Kesavepur	111.4	745
Bhikhari Pur Rural	176.3	2,156
Asat Mohioddeen Pur	298.4	2,675
Gaoria Khurd	43.3	297
Heera Pur	311.6	998
Bhariha Pur	90	2,302
Nevla Pur	334.5	1,866
Mustafabad	644.4	2,477
Hariapur	347.2	3,537
Aterdhani	391.4	4,769
Dandia Sunaora	543.5	1,657
Gondari	399.4	1,814
Utman Pur	236.4	982
Ganni Pur	203.8	805
Argu Pur	605.5	3,816
Tamoria Bujurg	281.5	1,798
Tamoria Khurd	217.2	1,119
Shadi Pur	1,069.3	7,390
Guljar Pur	359.5	3,835
Nawabad Garant	220.7	1,159
Gaoria Kalan	1,152.9	6,902
Sher Pur Kalan	481.2	2,935
Sikander Pur	113.4	502
Asrfabad	106.6	646
Dholwa	152.3	943
Pindna	242.4	1,601
Sadabad	239.1	1,368
Kanhao	172.2	1,235
Kursath Rural	1,914.5	13,484
