= Purwa =

- Nagar panchayat
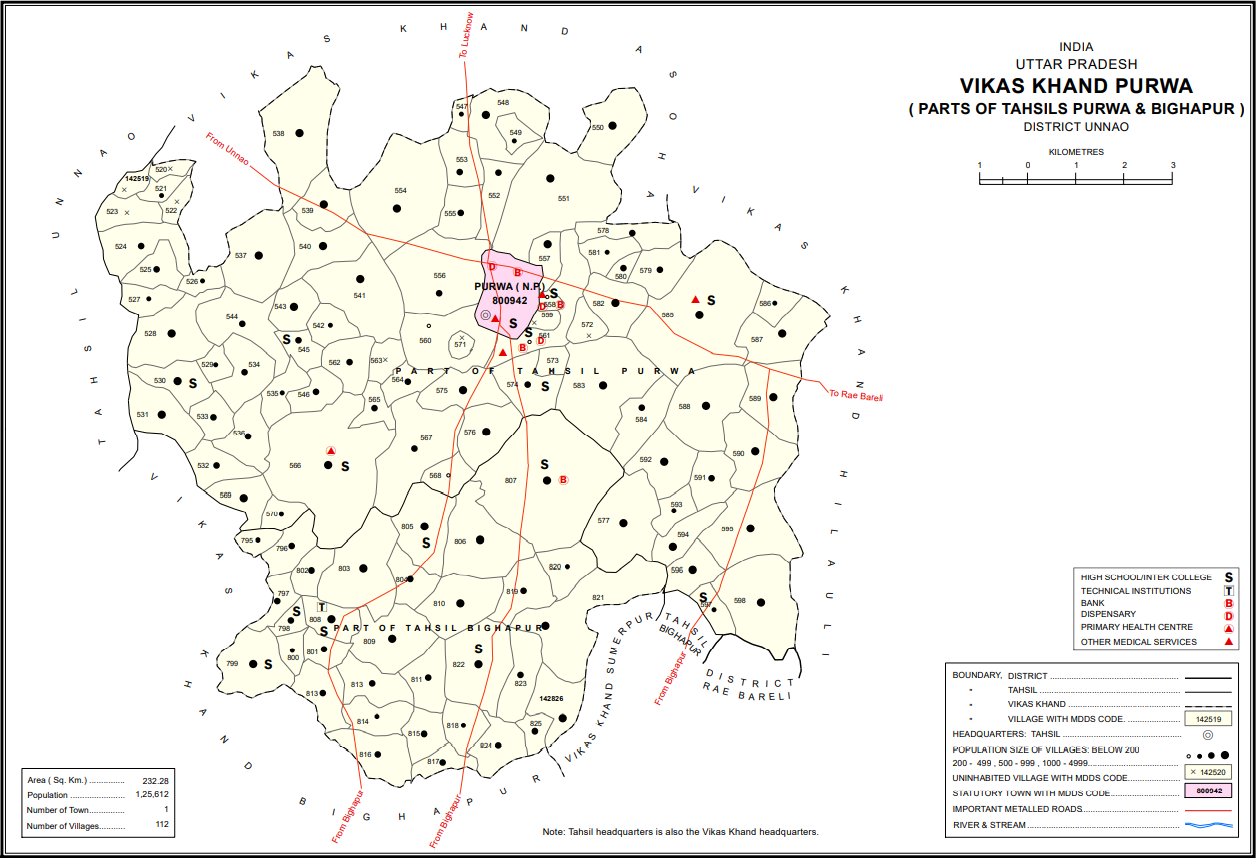
- Map of Purwa CD block

- Location in Uttar Pradesh, India
- Coordinates: 26.47°N 80.78°E
- Country: India
- State: Uttar Pradesh
- District: Unnao

Area
  - Total: 3.74 km^{2} (1.44 sq mi)
- Elevation: 129 m (423 ft)

Population (2001)
  - Total: 24,467
  - Density: 6,540/km^{2} (16,900/sq mi)

Languages
  - Official: Hindi
- Time zone: UTC+5:30 (IST)

Purwa is a town and nagar panchayat in Unnao district, Uttar Pradesh, India. It is located 32 km southeast of Unnao, the district headquarters. Roads connect it with several major cities including Unnao, Lucknow, Kanpur, and Rae Bareli. As of 2011, its population is 24,467 people, in 4,128 households.

Purwa is the headquarters of a community development block, which was first inaugurated on 1 April 1959 in order to oversee implementation of India's Five-Year Plans at a local and rural level. Most of the block lies within the tehsil of Purwa, but parts are in the tehsil of Bighapur instead. As of 2011, the block comprises 112 rural villages (including Asoha itself), with a total population of 125,619 people in 25,020 households.

== History ==
Purwa is said to have been founded sometime around the year 1400. Its antecedent was the village of Newayan a few miles to the west, which was founded by a Raghubansi from Ayodhya named Raja Newan. Newayan was wiped out by the Loni River and the ruling raja at the time, Ranbir Singh, founded a new town on the lands of three villages: Bhawanipur, Sokipur, and Kalyanpur. This new town was originally called Ranbirpur or Ranbhirpur after Ranbir Singh, and it appears under this name in the Ain-i-Akbari at the end of the 1500s. It was then the seat of a pargana which covered an extent of 75,490 bighas and was assessed at a value of 2,425,775 dams. The town had a brick fort and a military force of 2,000 infantry and 100 cavalry. At some point, the name "Ranbirpur" eventually became corrupted to "Ranjitpurwa" or simply "Purwa", hence the present name.

Under the Nawabs of Awadh, Purwa formed one of the chaklas, or districts, that made up present-day Unnao district. It covered the eastern portion of the current district. One of the most prominent figures in Purwa's history during this period was Raja Achal Singh Bais, who was the hereditary taluqdar of Daundia Khera and also served as chakladar and ruler of Purwa. He lived at Purwa from 1716 to 1776, and at one point fought a major battle against the other Bais Thakurs of Baiswara who resented his rule. Achal Singh won a complete victory and later laid out a garden at the site of the battlefield. He founded several villages including Achalganj, in the pargana of Harha, and Achal Khera in the pargana of Purwa. In 1184 Fasli, Achal Singh was replaced as governor by one Bhawani Singh, and not long after that he committed suicide by taking poison.

Another important figures from Purwa's history during this period was Raja Sital Parshad Tirbedi, who also served as nazim of Purwa. He established the Sitalganj market in Purwa (as well as another with the same name in Rasulabad) and endowed it with a temple and tank. Another historical figure was Fateh Ali, originally a slave, who founded the village of Fatehganj near Purwa and planted trees along the road from Purwa to Basha to shade travellers.

When the British annexed Oudh State in 1856, they originally chose Purwa as the headquarters of what is now Unnao district, but they were soon relocated to Unnao.

At the turn of the 20th century, Purwa was described as "a considerable town" that was very spread out and locally known for its skilled shoemakers. It held a bazaar twice per week, with an average attendance of about 1,000 visitors, and hosted several melas during the course of the year, each one with an average attendance of 7-8,000. It had tehsil offices, a munsifi court, a police station, a dispensary, a post office, and a middle school with 157 students. The population in 1901 was 10,260 people, including 7,529 Hindus and 2,705 Muslims; the largest communities present were the Brahmins, Banias, and Kayasths.

Purwa was declassified as a town for the 1961 and 1971 censuses, but was reclassified as such for the 1981 census.

== Geography ==
Purwa is located at 26.47°N 80.78°E.

== Unnamed soldiers in First World War ==
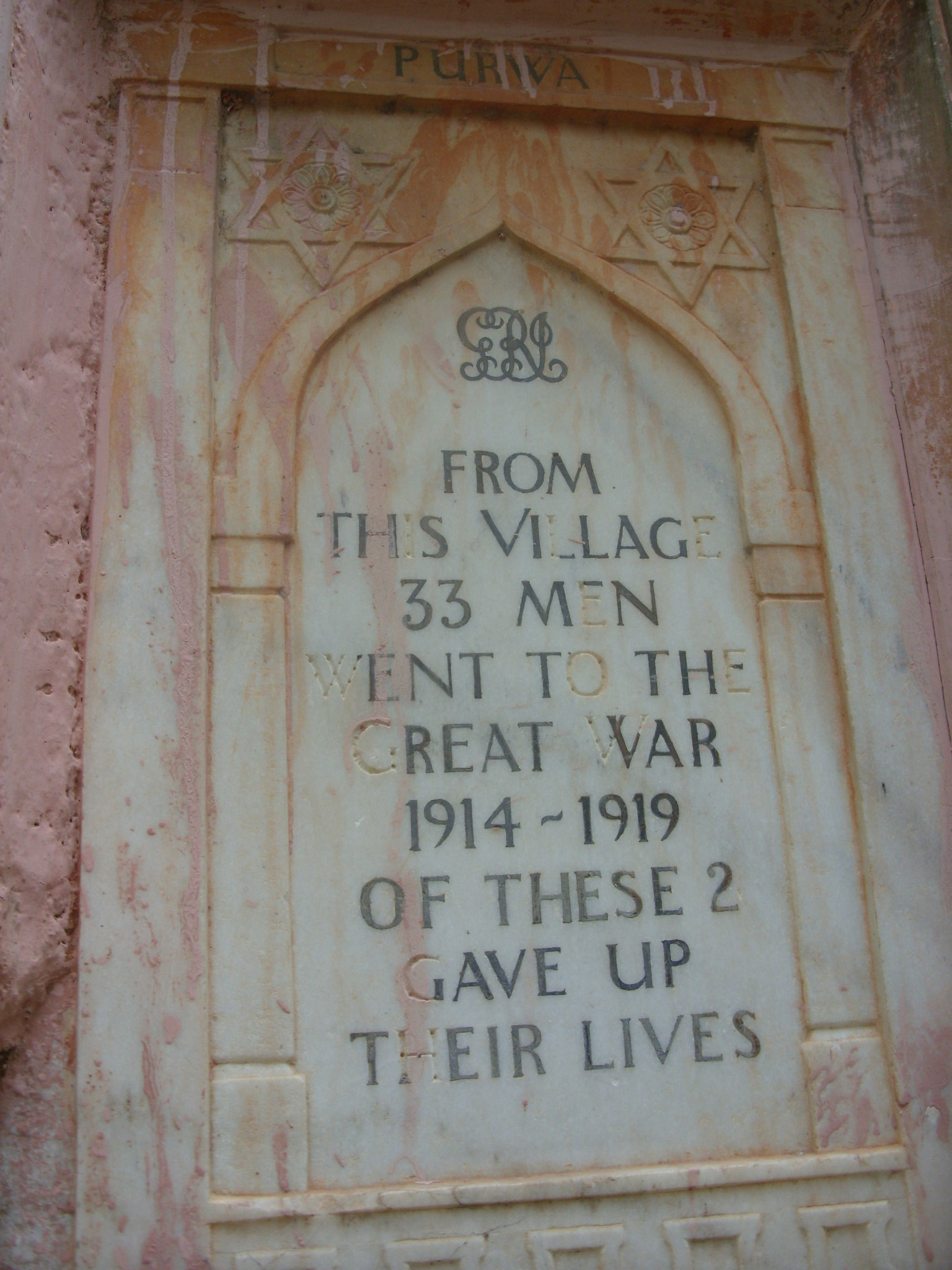
Marble plaque commemorating soldiers who went from Purwa village in World War I

There is a white marble plaque in the village which commemorates the contribution of 33 unnamed men from the village, who went to the Great War (1914–1919) and fought on the side of the British imperial forces.

== Demographics ==
Historical population
| Year | Pop. | ±% |
|---|---|---|
| 1901 | 10,260 | — |
| 1911 | 7,876 | −23.2% |
| 1921 | 7,172 | −8.9% |
| 1931 | 6,352 | −11.4% |
| 1941 | 8,893 | +40.0% |
| 1951 | 8,860 | −0.4% |
| 1961 | Not given | — |
| 1971 | Not given | — |
| 1981 | 15,235 | — |
| 1991 | 18,558 | +21.8% |
| 2001 | 21,271 | +14.6% |
| 2011 | 24,467 | +15.0% |
Source: 2011 Census of India

As of 2011 India census, Purwa had a population of 24,195. Males constitute 52% of the population and females 48%. Purwa has an average literacy rate of 54%, lower than the national average of 59.5%: male literacy is 60%, and female literacy is 47%. In Purwa, 30% of the population is under 12 years of age.

== Economy ==
The economy of Purwa is agriculture based. The outskirts of Purwa block produce rice (especially basmati and other rice varieties) and wheat. Other food grain crops include toor, green gram, moong, gram, barley, and maize. Hilauli block also produces mainly food grains. Mango orchards have great importance in this block. The agriculture is well developed, but the irrigation system of the area is not much good. Although this area have extensive canal system but they do not work properly . Agriculture totally depends upon underground water. But now many people also have their shops of various things in Purwa town . It is now hub of various economic activities for many nearby villages .

== Flora and fauna ==
Generally all the three crops of Rabi, Kharif and Zaid are grown. Wheat, paddy and arhar are the main crops. Fruit trees of mango, guava, jamun are in plenty. Except for the month of June, one can always find grass in the field. Cows, buffalo, goats and horses are reared for agricultural and domestic needs.

== Connectivity with other cities ==
It is near two popular cities of state Kanpur and Lucknow and connected by mainly road transport. One can take bus services from Charbag (Lucknow) to Kaiserbag (Lucknow) to Alambag (Lucknow). From Kanpur, one has to come to Unnao first and then take public transport for Purwa. In the rail budget for the year 2012-13, there was a proposal to check the feasibility of connecting Unnao to Lucknow via Purwa.

== Religion ==
The temple of Billeshwar Mahadeo and the tomb of Mina Sahib in Purwa are both revered by Hindus and Muslims alike. There are also the shrines of Niamat Shah and Hira Shah.

== Villages ==
Purwa CD block has the following 112 villages:

| Village name | Total land area (hectares) | Population (in 2011) |
|---|---|---|
| Lala Khera Vikram Gairabad | 87.7 | 0 |
| Lala Khera Laxman Gairabad | 39 | 0 |
| Mawaiya Ramae Khera | 89.3 | 387 |
| Lala Khera Nohari Gairabad | 20 | 0 |
| Lala Khera Janki Gairabad | 9.6 | 0 |
| Lala Khera Jawahar | 108.5 | 621 |
| Nathi Khera | 158.7 | 907 |
| Mada Khera | 50.3 | 322 |
| Bara Khera | 97.6 | 499 |
| Argaon Pansa Khera | 390.5 | 2,560 |
| Gokul Pur | 80.4 | 324 |
| Palhari | 148.2 | 1,208 |
| Unchagaon Sani | 368.5 | 2,431 |
| Hari Khera | 157.1 | 848 |
| Kataun | 99.7 | 784 |
| Bhulemau | 214.4 | 958 |
| Gadorwa | 95.4 | 382 |
| Barwat | 162.9 | 596 |
| Taragarhi | 376 | 1,488 |
| Langarpur | 400.9 | 1,755 |
| Uncha Gaon Killa | 317.6 | 1,884 |
| Mirzapur Sumhari | 456 | 2,694 |
| Ramavmrapur | 338.9 | 1,638 |
| Gangadas Pur | 106 | 376 |
| Nabab | 170.8 | 1,225 |
| Himmat Khera | 185.2 | 877 |
| Atwa | 56.9 | 530 |
| Semri Mau | 143.1 | 904 |
| Chak Bachur | 23.7 | 240 |
| Bahraura Bujurg | 173.2 | 1,572 |
| Shankar Chak | 15.8 | 329 |
| Majhgawan Sadqu | 178.1 | 1,441 |
| Bhupati Pur | 490.4 | 3,035 |
| Fatehganj | 162 | 798 |
| Suikhera | 193.7 | 714 |
| Kasraur | 556.2 | 2,679 |
| Patti Sukhnandan | 94.3 | 772 |
| Kasba Paschim | 373.5 | 917 |
| Asehru | 289.7 | 1,361 |
| Durgapur | 122.3 | 36 |
| Gulabbari | 26.6 | 0 |
| Kasba Bhawani Pur | 390.5 | 27 |
| Kasba Ramahimmat | 433.8 | 8 |
| Achalkhera | 145 | 890 |
| Sirsahib Lal | 10.5 | 0 |
| Chak Jamalpur | 104.2 | 654 |
| Dhirji Khera | 92.8 | 551 |
| Chamiani | 899.2 | 7,161 |
| Bisun Khera | 361.7 | 811 |
| Ahamdabad Grant | 78.5 | 172 |
| Sarson | 223.6 | 1,197 |
| Tikria | 98.4 | 320 |
| Sirkale Khan | 22.4 | 0 |
| Bharti Garhi | 56.9 | 0 |
| Kalyanpur | 59.5 | 0 |
| Chandi Garhi | 129.6 | 817 |
| Tiker Khurd | 205.9 | 1,086 |
| Tiker Kalan | 311.3 | 1,077 |
| Bewalmansa Khera | 320.4 | 1,868 |
| Daila | 81.9 | 580 |
| Chhulamau | 168.7 | 961 |
| Bachhulia | 39.1 | 531 |
| Basnoha | 135.4 | 485 |
| Tusraur | 220.7 | 1,222 |
| Bhadnag | 573.5 | 3,213 |
| Vade Khera | 190.9 | 514 |
| Banigaon | 753.6 | 3,418 |
| Himmatpur | 85.3 | 458 |
| Zambur Pur | 262.4 | 1,801 |
| Darheta | 372.2 | 2,582 |
| Muraita | 238.4 | 1,970 |
| Kodara | 284.4 | 1,416 |
| Nawa Gaon | 150.2 | 773 |
| Topra | 250.8 | 2,065 |
| Batau Mau | 104.8 | 373 |
| Bhatauli | 181.1 | 1,587 |
| Pinzra | 337.2 | 2,323 |
| Chandrasena | 144.7 | 1,067 |
| Asgar Ganj | 48.6 | 407 |
| Mohiuddinpur | 476.4 | 3,060 |
| Miya Ganj | 49.7 | 318 |
| Atwat | 18 | 960 |
| Jajanpur | 96.1 | 672 |
| Mulahimpur | 56.6 | 520 |
| Behta Bhawani | 281.5 | 2,796 |
| Lachhi Khera | 73.4 | 373 |
| Jagat Khera | 84 | 725 |
| Kathar | 145 | 923 |
| Salaithu | 356.1 | 1,263 |
| Kishan Khera | 151.4 | 845 |
| Mahramau | 290.1 | 1,589 |
| Lakhmademau | 329.6 | 1,461 |
| Tiprarpur | 1,059.4 | 4,539 |
| Gadha Kola | 171.2 | 1,186 |
| Bhatmau | 229.8 | 1,326 |
| Muraita | 246.2 | 1,180 |
| Tevaria | 150.4 | 991 |
| Sijnisohramau | 262.3 | 2,789 |
| Apsari | 150.9 | 884 |
| Majhigawan Sevak | 114.6 | 406 |
| Rasulpur | 127.7 | 617 |
| Arhauli | 172.2 | 754 |
| Dhemna Khera | 123.2 | 681 |
| Rawatpur | 145 | 457 |
| Raghunath Pur | 147.9 | 756 |
| Turkha | 119.4 | 490 |
| Pakra Buzurg | 464 | 3,249 |
| Mamrej Pur | 450.4 | 2,326 |
| Panhan | 112.1 | 545 |
| Baizua Mau | 176.2 | 939 |
| Ramakhera | 63.1 | 512 |
| Purander Pur | 137 | 1,210 |
