= Fatehganj (disambiguation) =

Fatehganj may refer to:

== Places ==
- Fatehganj, a town in Faizabad district, Uttar Pradesh, India
- Fatehganj, Unnao, a village in Unnao district, Uttar Pradesh, India
- Fatehgunj, a place in Vadodara district, Gujarat, India

== See also ==
- Fatehganj Pashchimi
- Fatehganj Purvi
