= Egevadluq Ragee =

- Born: October 30, 1920; Ikirasak, Nunavut
- Died: June 26, 1983 (aged 62)
- Other names: Eegivudluk, Eegyvudtuk, Egyvudlo, Eegeevadluk, Eegyvudluk, Eevudlook, Eegyvadluk
- Occupation: Artist

Egevadluq Ragee (Eegivudluk, Eegyvudtuk, Egyvudlo, Eegeevadluk, Eegyvudluk, Eevudlook, Eegyvadluk) (1920–1983) was a Canadian artist, known primarily for her hand drawn prints and acrylics.

== Career ==
Egevadluq Ragee’s interest in art began in 1959 while living in Tikerak when two other artists, Sheowak and Napatchie Pootoogook encouraged her to start drawing. From there Ragee began creating her early works, which were often drawn with graphite pencil on paper. Her drawings primarily feature mythical creatures, bird-animal-human transformations and scenes of traditional life in the Inuit. As her art developed, Ragee began experimenting with new mediums including acrylics, pen and ink, printmaking and wax crayon.

Ragee’s drawing style has been recognized for its use of small, short strokes used to shade large spaces, which was uncommon for artists of this period. With this technique, Ragee could incorporate new textures into her artworks. In addition to her drawings, by 1970 Ragee began painting with acrylics, making her one of the first Inuit in Cape Dorset to work with that medium.

== Biography ==
Ragee was born on October 30, 1920, near Cape Dorset, in the small camp of Ikirasak in Nunavut. Ragee lived with her parents, Pamiaktok and Sorisolutu until the birth of her sister when she began living with her grandparents in a nearby camp.

Ragee’s first marriage was to Kootoo with whom she had a son and daughter, the latter dying early in infancy. Soon after their son’s death, Kootoo himself died from an undisclosed illness.

When Ragee’s daughter reached four years of age, she remarried to Sakiassie and they adopted four children together. Originally living in Nuvudjuak, the couple eventually moved their family to Tikerak, a camp eight miles from Cape Dorset. In 1967, Ragee and her family moved again to Cape Dorset in response to the improved housing conditions. Ragee continued to live and work there until her death on June 26, 1983.
