= Shukla (disambiguation) =

Shukla is a surname of Sanskrit origin.

Shukla may also refer to:

== Places ==
- Shukla, Bhopal, in Madhya Pradesh India
- Shuklaganj, in Unnao district, Uttar Pradesh, India
- Shukla Khera, a village in Unnao district, Uttar Pradesh, India

== Other uses ==
- 12596 Shukla, a minor planet
- Shukla Bose, Indian educationist and social activist
- Shukla family, an Indian political family of Ram Kishore Shukla
- Shukla test, a variant of the Bechdel test
- Shukla paksha, the bright lunar fortnight in the Hindu calendar
- Shukla Yajurveda, a Hindu text
- Pandit Ravishankar Shukla University, Raipur, Chhattisgarh, India; named after Indian politician Ravishankar Shukla
- Ravishankar Shukla Stadium, a sports venue in Jabalpur, Madhya Pradesh, India
