= Kukri (disambiguation) =

The kukri is a type of knife associated with the Gurkhas.

Kukri, Khukri, Khukuri, or Kukuri may also refer to:

- Kukri, Unnao, a village in India
- Kukri Hills, a mountain range in Victoria Land
- Kukri Peneplain, an unconformity in the Transantarctic Mountains
- Oligodon, commonly known as the kukri snake, a genus of snakes
- Kukri Sports, a British sportswear brand
- Khukri-class corvette, an Indian Navy ship class
- Kukuri (film), a 2018 Namibian film
