= Panhan =

- Village
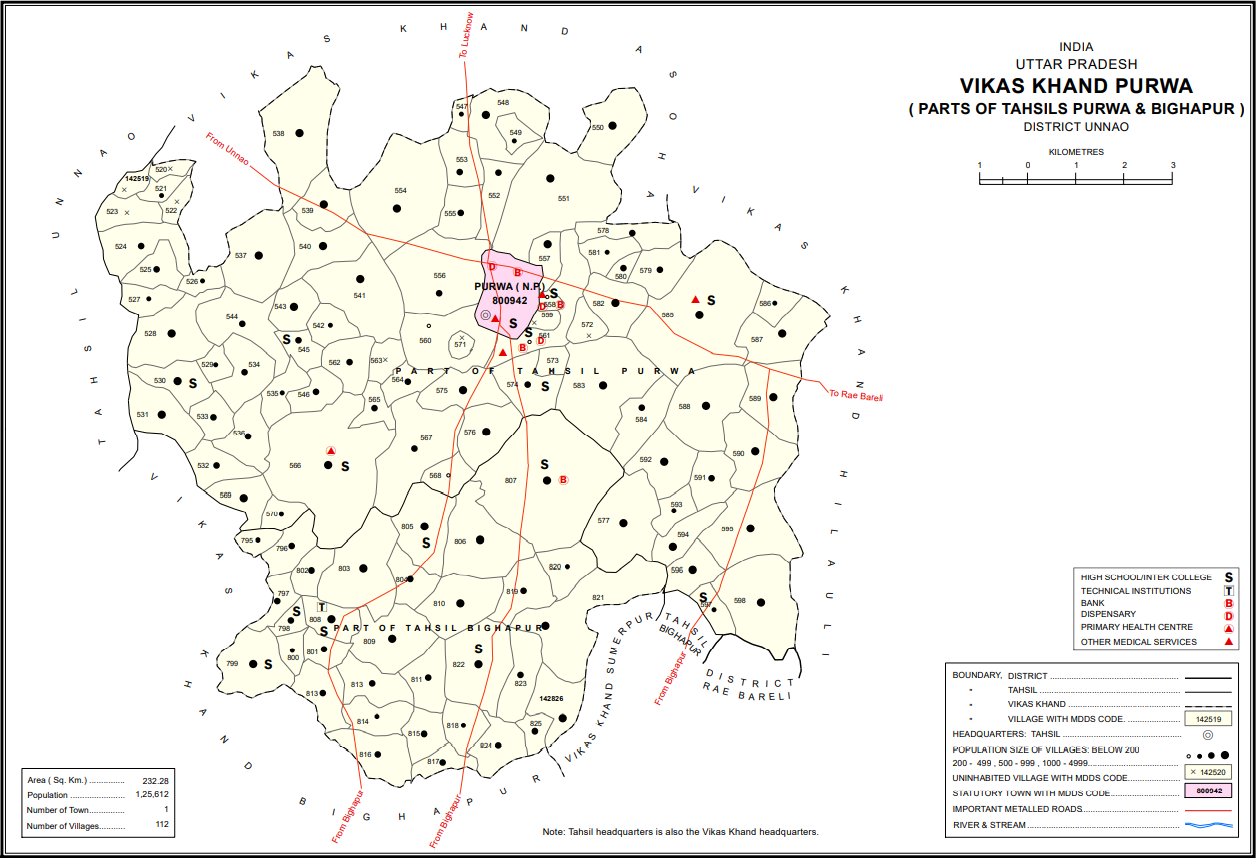
- Map showing Panhan (#823) in Purwa CD block

- Location in Uttar Pradesh, India
- Coordinates: 26.370868°N 80.79149°E
- Country India: India
- State: Uttar Pradesh
- District: Unnao

Area
  - Total: 1.121 km^{2} (0.433 sq mi)

Population (2011)
  - Total: 545
  - Density: 486/km^{2} (1,260/sq mi)

Languages
  - Official: Hindi
- Time zone: UTC+5:30 (IST)
- Vehicle registration: UP-35

Panhan, also called Panhan Khas, is a small village in Purwa block of Unnao district, Uttar Pradesh, India. Located due south of Purwa and a bit to the west of the Loni River, it historically was the seat of a pargana. As of 2011, the village's population is 545 people, in 104 households.

== History ==
Panhan was supposedly founded around 300 BCE by a Bhar raja named Pann, who named it after himself. An old ruined fort on the north side of the village is said to be the remains of the ancient Bhar stronghold. Then around 300 CE, it was supposedly conquered by Abhai Chand Bais and thereafter formed part of the region called Baiswara. Panhan is listed in the late-16th century Ain-i-Akbari as a Bais-held pargana, with a revenue of 267,809 dams and a military force of 300 infantry.

At the turn of the 20th century, Panhan was described as "a very small village, only worthy of mention as giving its name to the pargana." Locally renowned for its sweetmeats, it had three Hindu temples to Mahadeo and Devi, as well as the shrine of the Muslim faqir Muhammad Shah. Fairs were held in January and March in his honour, drawing large crowds from the surrounding countryside. It also had an upper primary school with 60 students, mostly coming from the neighbouring villages of Pakhra, Mamrezpur, and Malauna. The population of the village in 1901 was 284, a majority of whom were Kachhis; there was also a Muslim minority of 55.

The 1961 census recorded Panhan as comprising 2 hamlets, with a total population of 339 (184 male and 155 female), in 70 households and 68 physical houses. The area of the village was given as 323 acres.
