= FHJ =

FHJ may refer to:

- Fahnenjunker, a German military rank
- Fatehganj, a city in Uttar Pradesh, India
- Fontys Academy of Journalism, in the Netherlands
- Toyota FHJ, a fire truck
