= Rasulpur, Purwa =

Rasulpur Rasūlpur
- Village
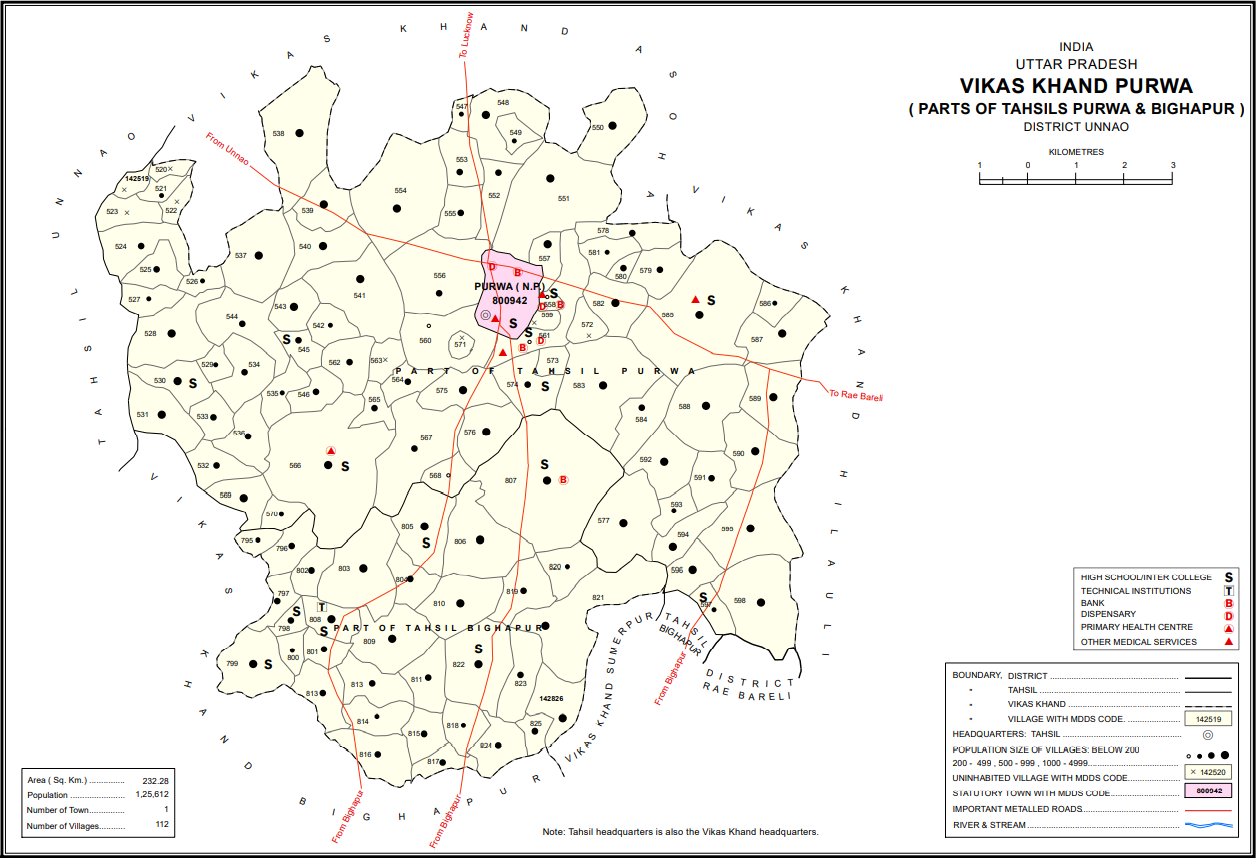
- Map showing Rasulpur (#815) in Purwa CD block

- Location in Uttar Pradesh, India
- Coordinates: 26.35094°N 80.763645°E
- Country India: India
- State: Uttar Pradesh
- District: Unnao

Area
  - Total: 1.277 km^{2} (0.493 sq mi)

Population (2011)
  - Total: 617
  - Density: 483/km^{2} (1,250/sq mi)

Languages
  - Official: Hindi
- Time zone: UTC+5:30 (IST)
- Vehicle registration: UP-35

Rasulpur is a village in Purwa block of Unnao district, Uttar Pradesh, India. As of 2011, its population is 617, in 118 households, and it has no schools and no healthcare facilities.

The 1961 census recorded Rasulpur as comprising 1 hamlet, with a total population of 230 (136 male and 94 female), in 20 households and 20 physical houses. The area of the village was given as 323 acres.
