= Parsanda =

- Village
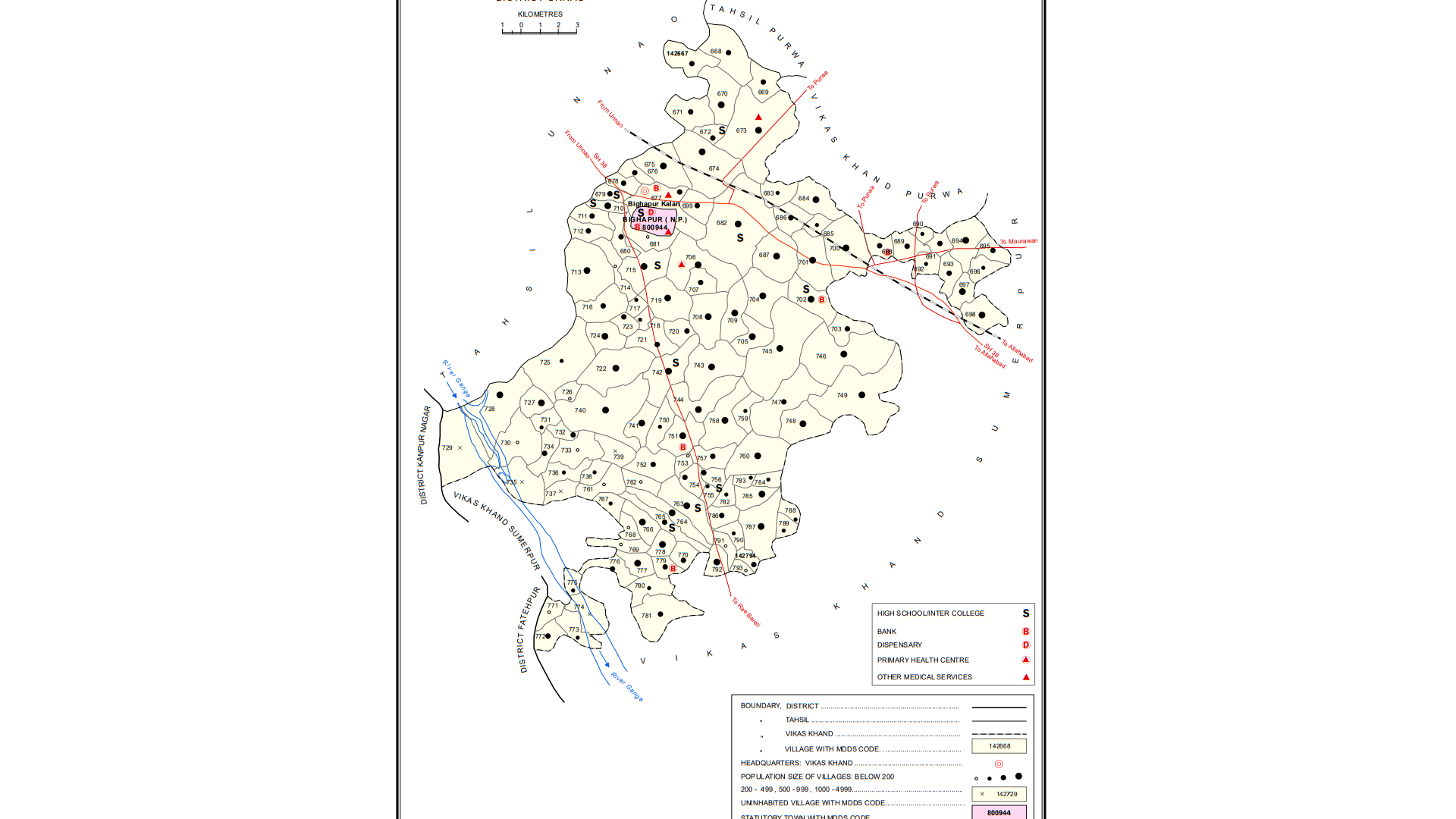
- Map showing Parsanda (#694) in Bighapur CD block

- Location in Uttar Pradesh, India
- Coordinates: 26.335894°N 80.790553°E
- Country India: India
- State: Uttar Pradesh
- District: Unnao

Area
  - Total: 2.292 km^{2} (0.885 sq mi)

Population (2011)
  - Total: 1,715
  - Density: 748.3/km^{2} (1,938/sq mi)

Languages
  - Official: Hindi
- Time zone: UTC+5:30 (IST)
- Vehicle registration: UP-35

Parsanda is a village in Bighapur block of Unnao district, Uttar Pradesh, India. It hosts a market on Thursdays, Fridays, and Sundays, and vegetables and cloth are the main items bought and sold. As of 2011, the population of Parsanda is 1,715, in 377 households, and it has one primary school and no healthcare facilities.

The 1961 census recorded Parsanda as comprising 2 hamlets, with a total population of 919 (429 male and 490 female), in 185 households and 146 physical houses. The area of the village was given as 577 acres. Average attendance of the thrice-weekly market was about 1,000 people. The village had the following small industrial establishments: 2 producers of edible fats/oils, 2 garment manufacturers, 2 makers of cork/bamboo/cane/leaf products, and 1 maker of shoes.
