= Dainta =

- Village
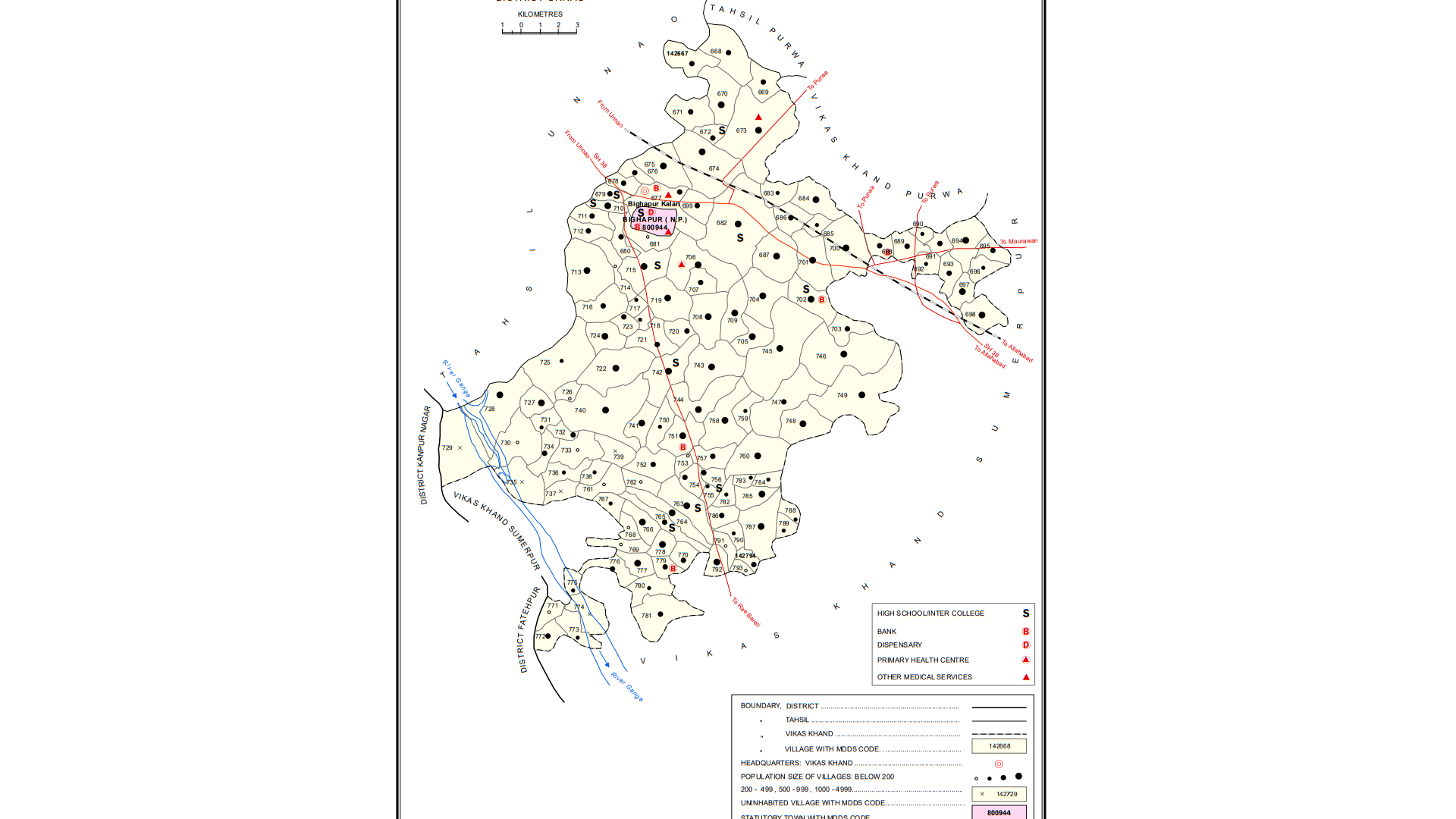
- Map showing Dainta (#696) in Bighapur CD block

- Location in Uttar Pradesh, India
- Coordinates: 26.326624°N 80.800615°E
- Country India: India
- State: Uttar Pradesh
- District: Unnao

Area
  - Total: 0.84 km^{2} (0.32 sq mi)

Population (2011)
  - Total: 464
  - Density: 550/km^{2} (1,400/sq mi)

Languages
  - Official: Hindi
- Time zone: UTC+5:30 (IST)
- Vehicle registration: UP-35

Dainta is a village in Bighapur block of Unnao district, Uttar Pradesh, India. As of 2011, its population is 464, in 90 households, and it has no schools and no healthcare facilities.

The 1961 census recorded Dainta as comprising one hamlet, with a total population of 179 (81 male and 98 female), in 36 households and 36 physical houses. The area of the village was given as 205 acres.
