= Kishan Khera =

- Village
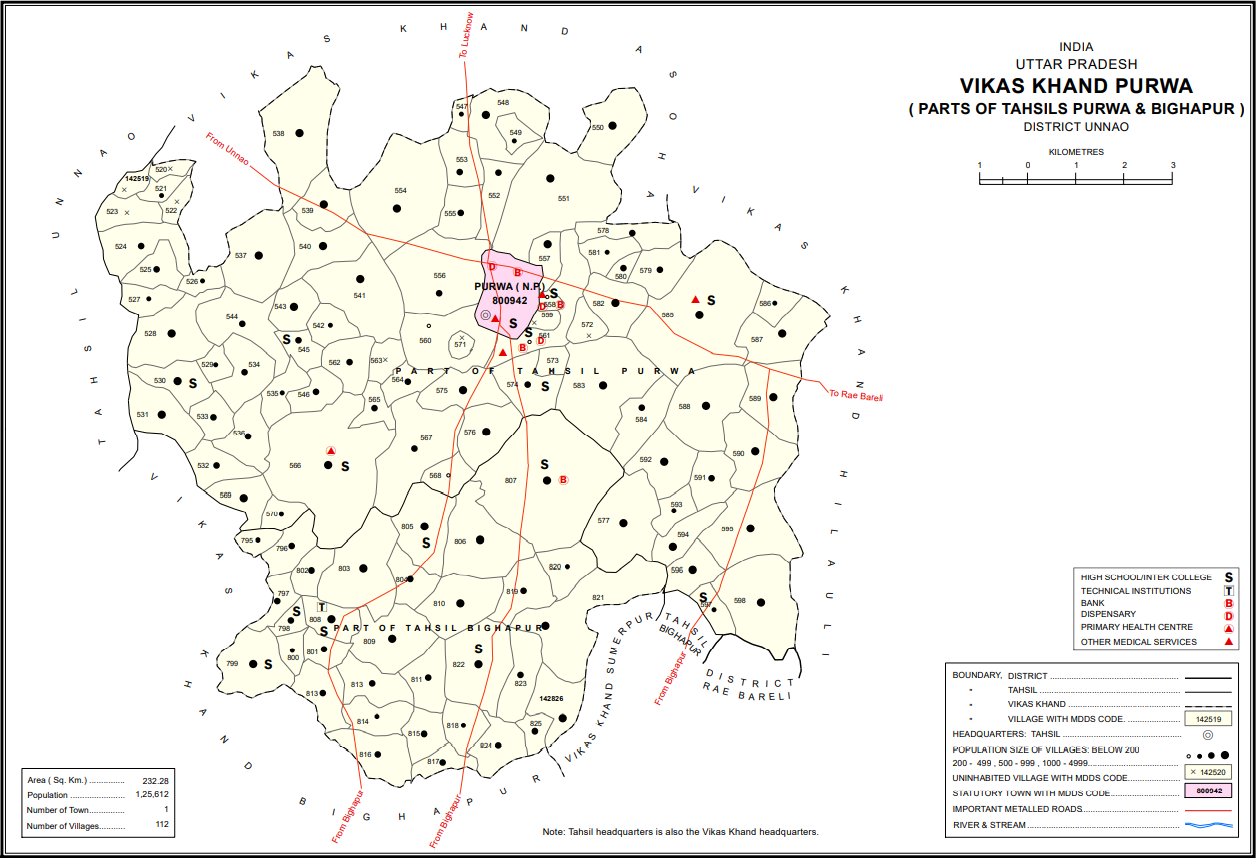
- Map showing Kishan Khera (#804) in Purwa CD block

- Location in Uttar Pradesh, India
- Coordinates: 26.391659°N 80.756339°E
- Country India: India
- State: Uttar Pradesh
- District: Unnao

Area
  - Total: 1.514 km^{2} (0.585 sq mi)

Population (2011)
  - Total: 845
  - Density: 558/km^{2} (1,450/sq mi)

Languages
  - Official: Hindi
- Time zone: UTC+5:30 (IST)
- Vehicle registration: UP-35

Kishan Khera is a village in Purwa block of Unnao district, Uttar Pradesh, India. It is not connected to major district roads and has one primary school and one medical practitioner. As of 2011, its population is 845, in 177 households.

The 1961 census recorded Kishan Khera (under the spelling "Kishun Khera") as comprising 1 hamlet, with a total population of 533 (274 male and 259 female), in 105 households and 96 physical houses. The area of the village was given as 381 acres. It had a medical practitioner then.
