= Bhatmau =

Bhatmau Bhātmau
- Village
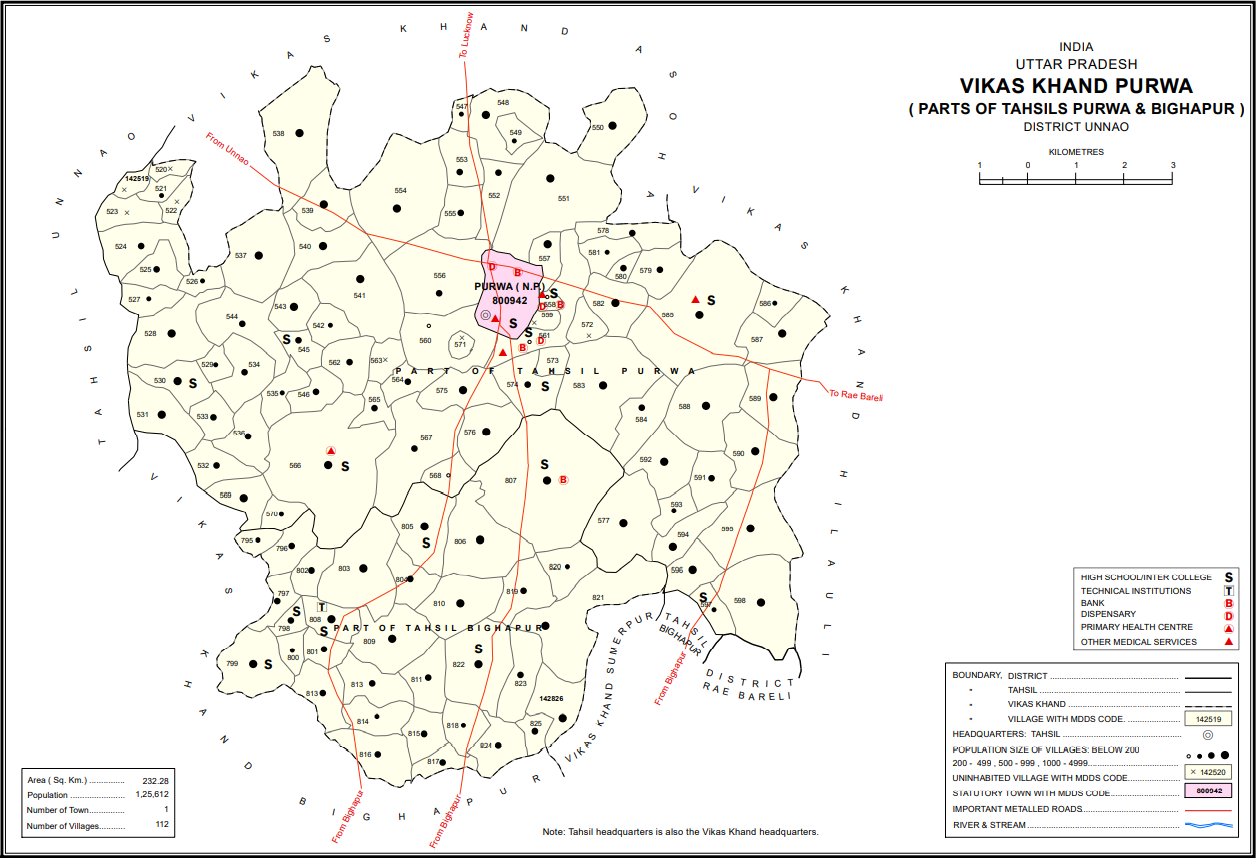
- Map showing Bhatmau (#809) in Purwa CD block

- Location in Uttar Pradesh, India
- Coordinates: 26.374838°N 80.750962°E
- Country India: India
- State: Uttar Pradesh
- District: Unnao

Area
  - Total: 2.298 km^{2} (0.887 sq mi)

Population (2011)
  - Total: 1,326
  - Density: 577.0/km^{2} (1,494/sq mi)

Languages
  - Official: Hindi
- Time zone: UTC+5:30 (IST)
- Vehicle registration: UP-35

Bhatmau is a village in Purwa block of Unnao district, Uttar Pradesh, India. It is not connected to major district roads and has one primary school and no healthcare facilities. As of 2011, its population is 1,326, in 309 households.

The 1961 census recorded Bhatmau as comprising 1 hamlet, with a total population of 733 (380 male and 353 female), in 135 households and 131 physical houses. The area of the village was given as 592 acres. It had 1 small cotton processing establishment, 5 tanneries, 1 small manufacturer of either ammunition, fireworks, or other explosives, and 2 small manufacturers of items not otherwise specified.
