= Lakhmademau =

- Village
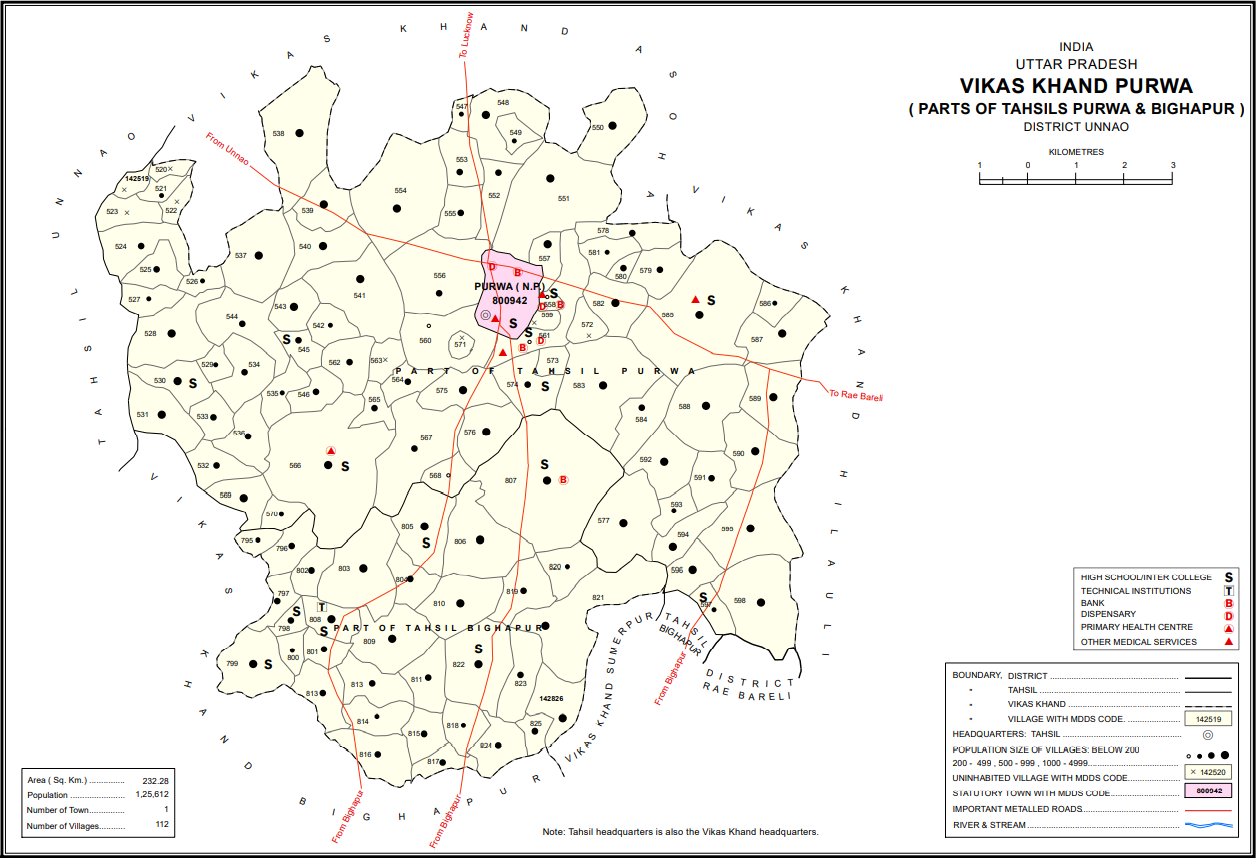
- Map showing Lakhmademau (#806) in Purwa CD block

- Location in Uttar Pradesh, India
- Coordinates: 26.398232°N 80.774977°E
- Country India: India
- State: Uttar Pradesh
- District: Unnao

Area
  - Total: 3.296 km^{2} (1.273 sq mi)

Population (2011)
  - Total: 1,461
  - Density: 443.3/km^{2} (1,148/sq mi)

Languages
  - Official: Hindi
- Time zone: UTC+5:30 (IST)
- Vehicle registration: UP-35

Lakhmademau is a village in Purwa block of Unnao district, Uttar Pradesh, India. It is connected to minor district roads and has one primary schools and one medical practitioner. As of 2011, its population is 1,461, in 296 households.

The 1961 census recorded Lakhmademau as comprising 8 hamlets, with a total population of 619 (319 male and 300 female), in 145 households and 138 physical houses. The area of the village was given as 817 acres.
