= Rawatpur, Purwa =

Rawatpur Rāwatpur
- Village
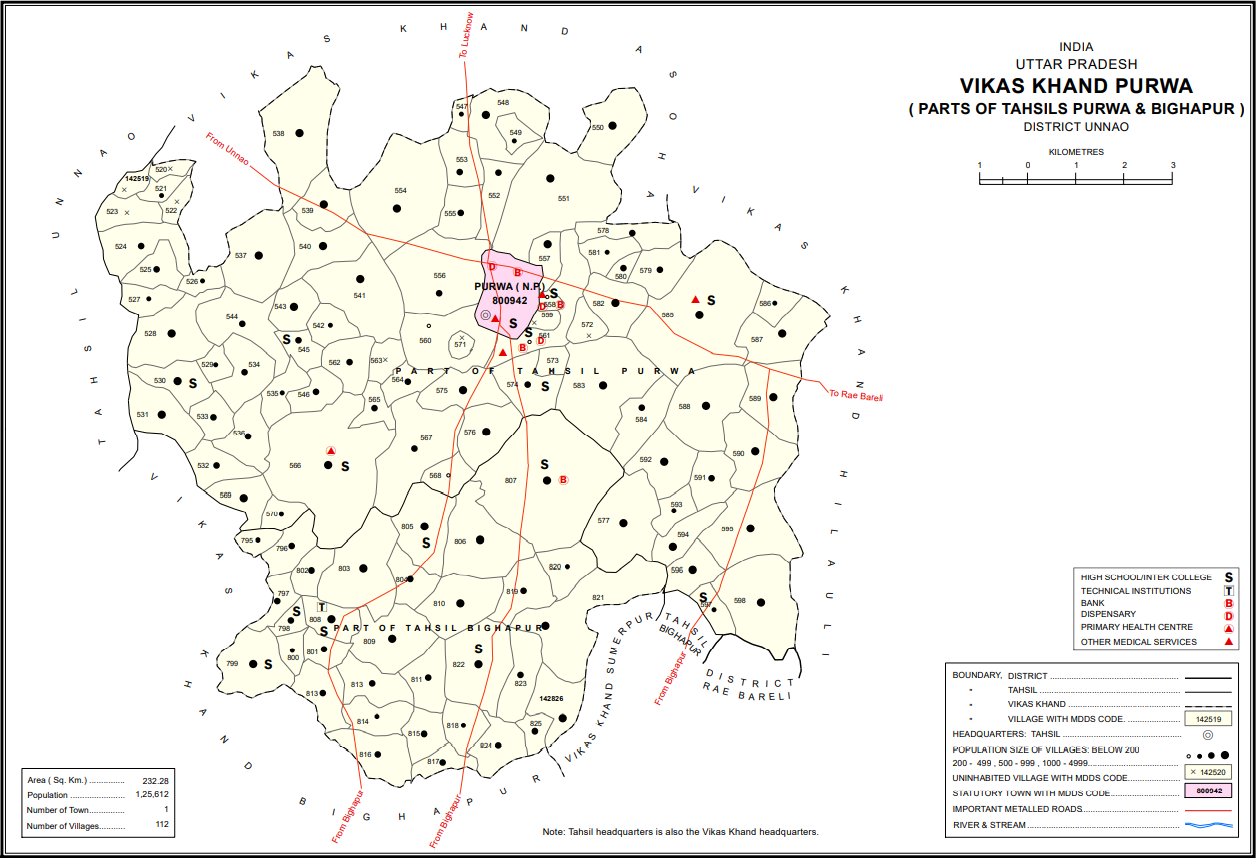
- Map showing Rawatpur (#818) in Purwa CD block

- Location in Uttar Pradesh, India
- Coordinates: 26.352036°N 80.773078°E
- Country India: India
- State: Uttar Pradesh
- District: Unnao

Area
  - Total: 1.45 km^{2} (0.56 sq mi)

Population (2011)
  - Total: 457
  - Density: 315/km^{2} (816/sq mi)

Languages
  - Official: Hindi
- Time zone: UTC+5:30 (IST)
- Vehicle registration: UP-35

Rawatpur is a village in Purwa block of Unnao district, Uttar Pradesh, India. As of 2011, its population is 457, in 78 households, and it has no schools and no healthcare facilities.

The 1961 census recorded Rawatpur as comprising 2 hamlets, with a total population of 187 (96 male and 91 female), in 30 households and 30 physical houses. The area of the village was given as 361 acres.
