= Magrayar =

Magrayar Magrair
- Village
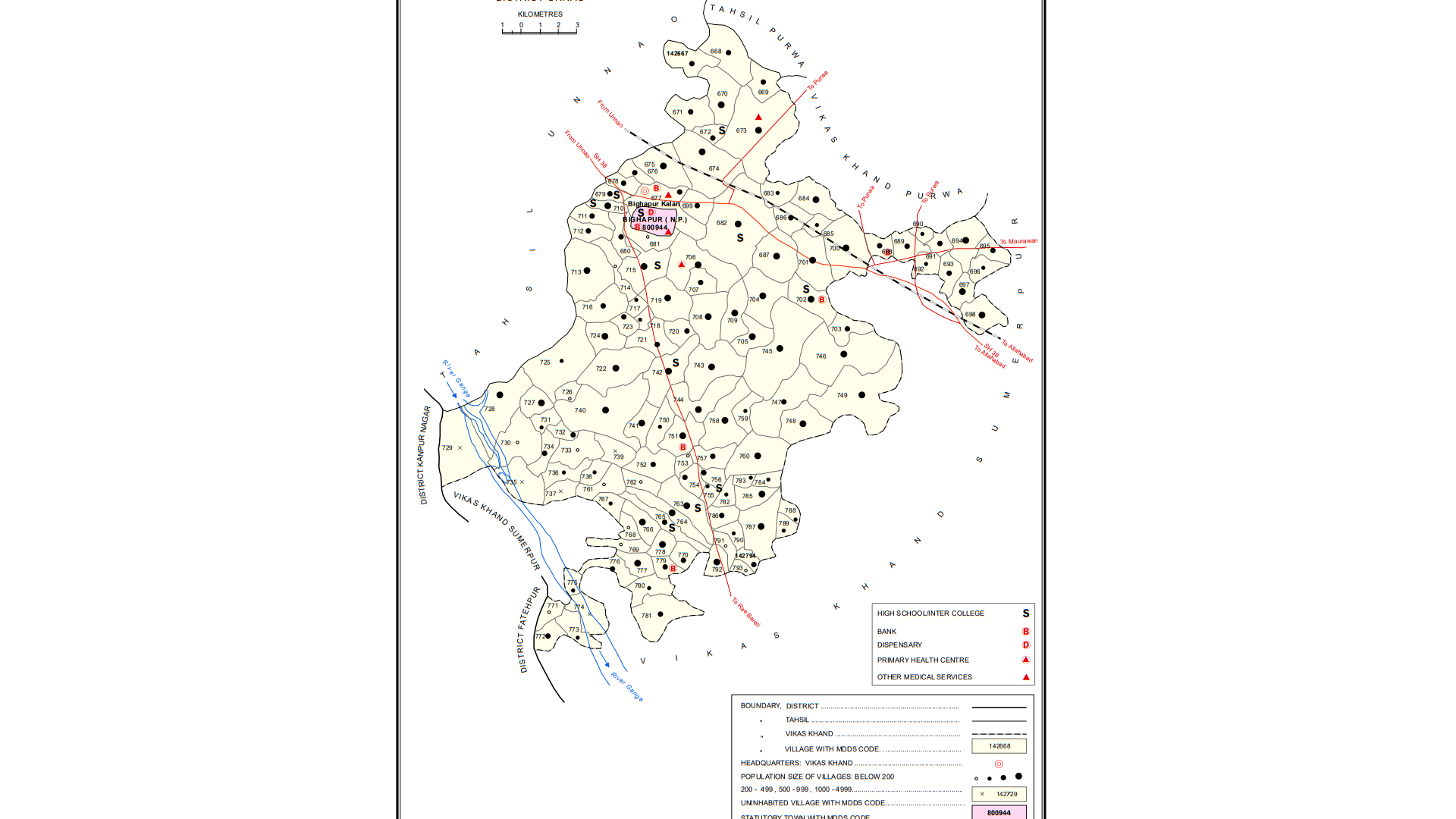
- Map showing Magrayar (#673) in Bighapur CD block

- Location in Uttar Pradesh, India
- Coordinates: 26°23′N 80°41′E
- Country India: India
- State: Uttar Pradesh
- District: Unnao

Area
  - Total: 8.864 km^{2} (3.422 sq mi)

Population (2011)
  - Total: 4,248
  - Density: 479.2/km^{2} (1,241/sq mi)

Languages
  - Official: Hindi
- Time zone: UTC+5:30 (IST)
- Vehicle registration: UP-35

≥→≥

Magrayar is a village in Bighapur block of Unnao district, Uttar Pradesh, India. Located 7km from Bighapur, Magrayar hosts a market on Mondays and Thursdays and was historically the seat of a pargana since at least the late 1500s. As of 2011, Magrayar's population is 4,248, in 964 households.

In the outskirts of the village there is a famous Kalika Devi Mandir, Deeheshwar Mahadev Mandir and Lakshyeshwar Mahadev Mandir, Nimban Mata, Fhool Devi Mata. This village played significant role in pre-independence era as a market area for near-by places but has lost much of its significance with development of nearby areas of Bighapur and Purwa while this has somewhat remained as it was.

The village was the birthplace of famous Hindi Critic Aacharya Nand Dulare Bajpai, who also served as Vice Chancellor of Vikram University, Ujjain for a brief period. Notably the village is also a native to premier Indian stand up comedian Raju Srivastava where his father Balai Kaka used to live before he shifted to Kanpur.

Mr. Raju Patel is the current Gram Panchayat Pramukh of Magrair.

== History ==
The origin of the name Magrayar is not known. It is attested as a pargana capital since the time of the Mughal emperor Akbar. Under the Nawabs of Awadh, a tehsildar resided at Magrayar and had authority over the entire pargana.

At the turn of the 20th century, Magrayar was described as a sleepy little town, located off the main roads traversing the area. The 1901 census recorded a population of 2,056 residents, including a Muslim minority of 60. Magrayar then had an upper primary school, with 62 students, as well as one mosque and five Hindu temples — four dedicated to Devi and one to Mahadeo.

The 1961 census recorded Magrayar (as "Magrair") as comprising 5 hamlets, with a total population of 2,627 (1,382 male and 1,245 female), in 480 households and 478 physical houses. The area of the village was given as 2,204 acres. It had a library, a medical practitioner, and a post office then.

== Sport ==
A big Wrestling event is also organised annually by 'Nandini Trust' in Magrair in the memory of famous Hindi poet Mahapran Nirala and Acharya Nand Dulare Bajpayi.
