= Himmatpur =

- Village
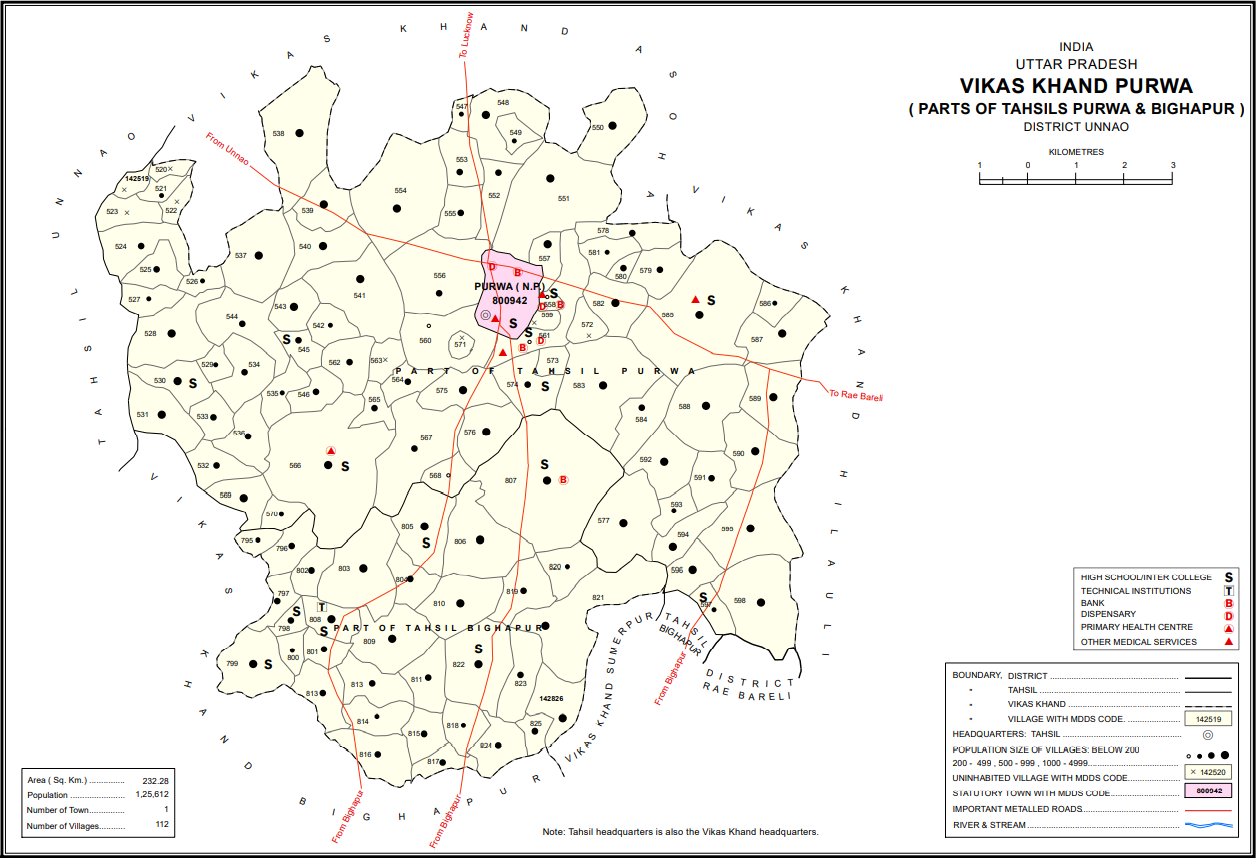
- Map showing Himmatpur (#586) in Purwa CD block

- Location in Uttar Pradesh, India
- Coordinates: 26.453946°N 80.855313°E
- Country India: India
- State: Uttar Pradesh
- District: Unnao

Area
  - Total: 0.853 km^{2} (0.329 sq mi)

Population (2011)
  - Total: 458
  - Density: 537/km^{2} (1,390/sq mi)

Languages
  - Official: Hindi
- Time zone: UTC+5:30 (IST)
- Vehicle registration: UP-35

Himmatpur is a village in Purwa block of Unnao district, Uttar Pradesh, India. As of the 2011 census, the village had population of 458, residing in 114 households. It has a primary school but lacks healthcare facilities.

The 1961 census recorded Himmatpur as consisting of one hamlet with a population of 281 (142 males and 139 females) in 65 households and 64 physical houses. The area of the village was listed as 214 acres.
