= Chhulamau =

Chhulamau Chhulāmau
- Village
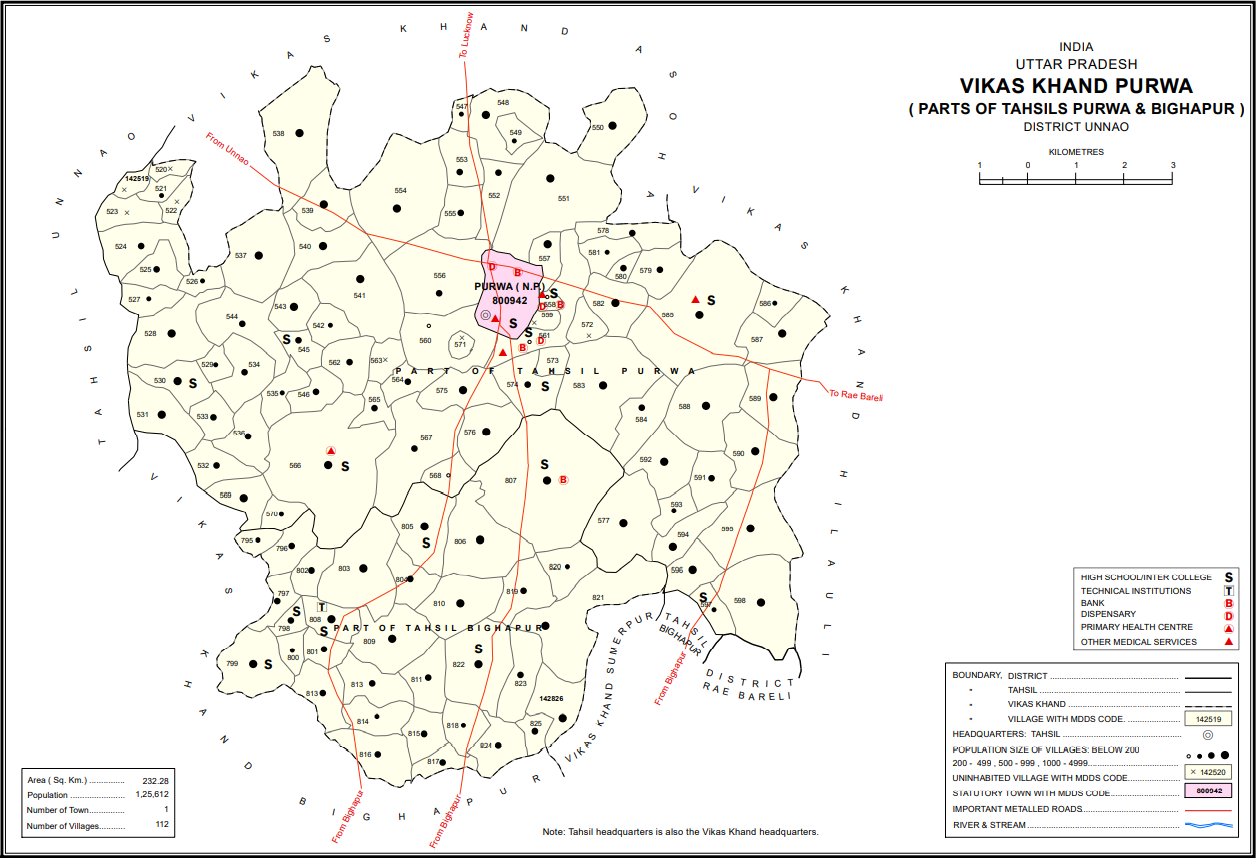
- Map showing Chhulamau (#579) in Purwa CD block

- Location in Uttar Pradesh, India
- Coordinates: 26.461534°N 80.824026°E
- Country India: India
- State: Uttar Pradesh
- District: Unnao

Area
  - Total: 1.687 km^{2} (0.651 sq mi)

Population (2011)
  - Total: 961
  - Density: 570/km^{2} (1,480/sq mi)

Languages
  - Official: Hindi
- Time zone: UTC+5:30 (IST)
- Vehicle registration: UP-35

Chhulamau is a village in Purwa block of Unnao district, Uttar Pradesh, India. It is not connected to major district roads and has three primary schools and no healthcare facilities. As of 2011, its population is 961, in 180 households.

The 1961 census recorded Chhulamau (under the spelling "Choolamau") as comprising 1 hamlet, with a total population of 509 (247 male and 262 female), in 85 households and 82 physical houses. The area of the village was given as 717 acres.
