= Bilpur railway station =

Railway station in Uttar Pradesh

- Indian Railways logo

General information
- Location: Fatehganj Purvi, Bareilly, Uttar Pradesh; India
- Coordinates: 28.0806393°N 79.5897326°E
- Elevation: 163 metres (535 ft)
- System: Indian Railways station
- Owner: Indian Railways
- Operator: Northern Railway
- Line: Lucknow–Moradabad line
- Platforms: 2
- Connections: Auto stand

Construction
- Structure type: Standard (on-ground station)
- Parking: No
- Cycle facilities: No

Other information
- Station code: BLPU
- Zone(s): Northern Railway
- Division(s): Moradabad
Location
- Location within Uttar Pradesh Location within India

Bilpur railway station (station code: BLPU) is a railway station on the Lucknow–Moradabad line located in the town of Fatehganj Purvi in Bareilly, Uttar Pradesh, India. It is under the administrative control of the Moradabad Division of the Northern Railway zone of the Indian Railways.

The station consists of two platforms, and is located at a distance of 35 kilometres (22 mi) from Bareilly Junction and Shahjahanpur. Eight trains (Six Passenger / Two Express) stop at the station.
