= Aosiyan =

Aosiyan is a village in Unnao district, Uttar Pradesh, India near town Bighapur. J.D.V.M. Inter College is in this village.
