= Bighapur =

- Nagar panchayat
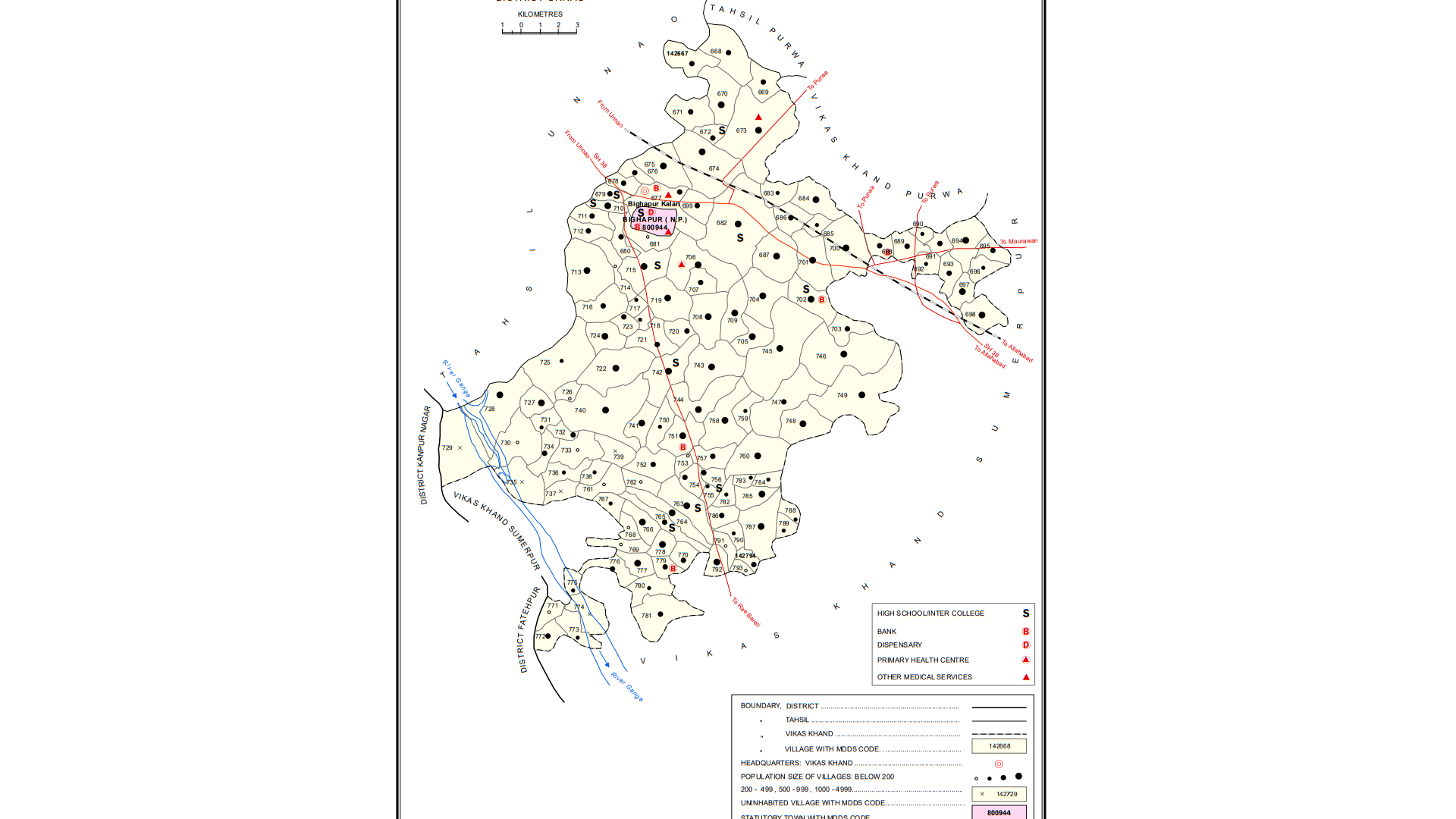
- Map of Bighapur CD block

- Location in Uttar Pradesh, India Bighapur (India)
- Coordinates: 26.35°N 80.68°E
- Country: India
- State: Uttar Pradesh
- District: Unnao

Area
  - Total: 2.3 km^{2} (0.89 sq mi)
- Elevation: 122 m (400 ft)

Population (2011)
  - Total: 6,501
  - Density: 2,800/km^{2} (7,300/sq mi)

Languages
  - Official: Hindi
- Time zone: UTC+5:30 (IST)
- Postal code: 209865
- Vehicle registration: UP35
- Website: up.gov.in

Bighapur is a town and nagar panchayat in Unnao district of Uttar Pradesh, India. First officially classified as a town for the 1981 census, it now serves as a tehsil headquarters(established in Patan). Important items manufactured here include clay pots, leather products, and wooden furniture. As of 2011, the population of Bighapur is 6,501, in 1,201 households.

Bighapur is the headquarters of a community development block, which was first inaugurated on 1 October 1959 in order to oversee implementation of India's Five-Year Plans at a local and rural level. As of 2011, the block comprises 128 rural villages, with a total population of 136,589 people in 27,180 households.

== Demographics ==
Historical population
| Year | Pop. | ±% |
|---|---|---|
| 1981 | 5,125 | — |
| 1991 | 5,935 | +15.8% |
| 2001 | 6,294 | +6.0% |
| 2011 | 6,501 | +3.3% |
Source: 2011 Census of India

According to the 2011 census, Bighapur has a population of 6,501 people, in 1,201 households. The town's sex ratio is 927 females to every 1000 males; 3,374 of Bighapur's residents are male (52%) and 3,127 are female (48%). The 0-6 age group makes up about 10.1% of the town's population; the sex ratio for this group is 918, which is higher than the district urban average of 903. Members of Scheduled Castes make up 25.75% of the town's population, while no members of Scheduled Tribes were recorded. The town's literacy rate was 80.9% (counting only people age 7 and up); literacy was higher among men and boys (87.7%) than among women and girls (73.5%). The scheduled castes literacy rate is 70.8% (78.2% among men and boys, and 62.6% among women and girls).

In terms of employment, 22.8% of Nawabganj residents were classified as main workers (i.e. people employed for at least 6 months per year) in 2011. Marginal workers (i.e. people employed for less than 6 months per year) made up 11.6%, and the remaining 65.5% were non-workers. Employment status varied significantly according to gender, with 53.2% of men being either main or marginal workers, compared to only 14.2% of women.

27.2% of Bighapur residents live in slum conditions as of 2011. There are 4 slum areas in Bighapur: Nageshwar Nagar, Shastri Nagar, Gandhi Nagar, and Sandhohi Nagar (the largest). These range in size from about 60 to 150 households and have between 5 and 50 tap water access points. The number of flush toilets installed in people's homes ranges from 10 to 35. All 4 areas are serviced by open sewers.

== Education ==
Degree colleges:

- Maha Pran Nirala (MPN) Degree College, Osiya, Bighapur, Unnao
- Sardar Patel Banshgopal Sanatan Dharm Degree College, Mahai, Bighapur, Unnao
- Raghuraja Degree College

Inter Colleges:

- Kamlapati Inter College
- Lahshmi Narayan Public Inter College
- Parwati Balika Inter College
- Saraswati Gyan Mandir Inter College
- Patiraja Inter College

== Healthcare ==
Bighapur has one block level hospital near BSNL telephone exchange, Bighapur.

== Transport ==
=== Rail ===
Bighapur Railway Station is the junction point for Rae Bareli, unchahar, Kanpur, Unnao. There are total 4 passenger trains which are passes through Bighapur Railway Station and has stoppage also.

=== Road ===
Bighapur is situated just 30 km away from Unnao Bypass Gate near Nirala Nagar and distance from Raebareli, Uttar Pradesh is approx 70 km. Distance between Bighapur and Kanpur is only 40 km.

== Villages ==
Bighapur CD block has the following 128 villages:

| Village name | Total land area (hectares) | Population (in 2011) |
|---|---|---|
| Lal Ganj | 235.9 | 853 |
| Kalaon | 321.5 | 785 |
| Rajapur Garhewa | 168.6 | 511 |
| Anon | 320 | 2,534 |
| Jagdish Pur | 232.4 | 711 |
| Baijnath Khera | 98.9 | 542 |
| Magrayar | 886.4 | 4,248 |
| Behta Gopi | 311.7 | 1,666 |
| Pahihardo | 523 | 2,734 |
| Saidpur | 86.7 | 531 |
| Bighapur Kalan | 462.8 | 782 |
| Danda Mau | 116 | 930 |
| Tikari Mau | 59 | 525 |
| Kalhe Pur | 123 | 982 |
| Bighapur Khurd | 202.1 | 117 |
| Aosiyan | 889.6 | 4,514 |
| Premi Khera | 38.4 | 213 |
| Sasan | 233.3 | 1,138 |
| Dhuadhar | 75 | 476 |
| Mardanpur | 999.1 | 587 |
| Akbabad | 310.6 | 2,055 |
| Jagat Khera | 133.7 | 646 |
| Shukla Khera | 131 | 851 |
| Kukri | 79.7 | 471 |
| Mirmau | 64 | 813 |
| Sukhdev Pur | 94 | 387 |
| Dhamni Khera | 136.4 | 952 |
| Parsanda | 229.2 | 1,715 |
| Maharajpur | 55.4 | 592 |
| Dainta | 80.4 | 464 |
| Bhairam Pur | 154.6 | 1,025 |
| Kheswa | 202.3 | 1,028 |
| Gauri | 138.9 | 964 |
| Manpur | 100.7 | 1,255 |
| Bhogita | 340.2 | 1,329 |
| Indemau Nihali Khera | 268.8 | 1,691 |
| Goshi Khera | 14.7 | 532 |
| Aram | 280.8 | 1,108 |
| Rajapur Piprha | 199 | 1,076 |
| Katra Diwan Khera | 377.8 | 3,282 |
| Bhabe Mau | 102 | 651 |
| Nasirpur | 346 | 1,892 |
| Lalganj | 102 | 1,705 |
| Rujihai | 162 | 2,289 |
| Dundpur | 104 | 780 |
| Mawaiya | 119.4 | 731 |
| Ghatampur Kalan | 601.6 | 3,029 |
| Chak Dhaurehara | 42.4 | 186 |
| Ghatampur Khurd | 349 | 1,526 |
| Pandeypur | 272.9 | 813 |
| Naraotampur | 38.9 | 411 |
| Bisenmau | 52.6 | 484 |
| Pali | 332 | 1,758 |
| Sarhe Mau | 144 | 765 |
| Karnai Pur | 137 | 701 |
| Sathniwala Khera | 373 | 1,328 |
| Adhurj Pur | 260 | 746 |
| Kamra Jana Pur | 280 | 1,686 |
| Narghva | 404 | 394 |
| Chak Khurd Hai | 61.4 | 154 |
| Karmi | 437 | 1,281 |
| Garhewa | 405.8 | 1,641 |
| Chautari Khurd | 0 | 0 |
| Keola Khera | 315.2 | 3 |
| Khurd Hai | 94 | 247 |
| Piprasar | 55 | 585 |
| Duruharu | 200.2 | 38 |
| Terhwa | 195 | 954 |
| Bbhadaiya Khera | 378.5 | 0 |
| Fatehpur | 95 | 499 |
| Katri Bhadaiya Khera | 107.1 | 0 |
| Dariyabad | 92.6 | 418 |
| Chak Udhaintal | 171.2 | 0 |
| Chilauli | 791.3 | 1,707 |
| Qutubuddin Garheva | 117.6 | 1,145 |
| Terha | 373 | 3,909 |
| Belhadyal Ganj | 439.4 | 1,461 |
| Saru Khera | 233.5 | 2,533 |
| Bardaha | 763.1 | 3,895 |
| Akberpur | 823 | 3,075 |
| Rudrpur | 185 | 710 |
| Kharjhara | 304.3 | 1,235 |
| Kumbhi | 687.5 | 3,800 |
| Ratui Khera | 193.9 | 358 |
| Barahardo | 267.3 | 3,763 |
| Jhagar Pur | 202.3 | 757 |
| Chak Patkan Khera | 36 | 101 |
| Parauri Chandika Baks | 103 | 799 |
| Parauri Harchand | 55.2 | 390 |
| Ruppur Joravarpur | 83 | 528 |
| Birpur Dithwa | 194 | 815 |
| Purauna | 424.2 | 2,095 |
| Kandhiani | 114.6 | 386 |
| Dundpur | 129.2 | 1,179 |
| Ramnagar Ahetmali | 101.9 | 97 |
| Chak Nihali Khera | 71.9 | 9 |
| Sagwar | 307.4 | 2,815 |
| Bhartipur | 157.9 | 1,467 |
| Nihali Khera | 112 | 997 |
| Tilokpur | 134 | 1,107 |
| Ramnagar Gair Ahetmali | 330.3 | 266 |
| Chak Jalala | 88.5 | 8 |
| Kachi Bari | 34.7 | 97 |
| Rasulpur Rata Khera | 137 | 896 |
| Mishran Khera | 303 | 121 |
| Lala Khera Mustahkam | 123.6 | 747 |
| Lala Khera Gair Mustahkam | 112.9 | 240 |
| Babu Khera Kachhoh | 145.5 | 0 |
| Chahlala | 227.4 | 200 |
| Jairaj Mau | 132.1 | 971 |
| Raipur | 135.8 | 1,260 |
| Alipur | 148.5 | 2,200 |
| Harishchandrapur | 71.7 | 831 |
| Pithai Khera Khurd | 47.4 | 490 |
| Digvijaipur | 339.4 | 605 |
| Gulal Khera | 57.2 | 491 |
| Hilgi | 70.3 | 456 |
| Navajikhera | 25.3 | 205 |
| Majhigawa | 329.6 | 1,350 |
| Bay | 88.3 | 715 |
| Rawatpur | 329.1 | 2,640 |
| Bhagulekhera | 32.6 | 354 |
| Mahrenda | 97.6 | 405 |
| Madhopur | 49.7 | 351 |
| Ganeshikhera | 31 | 94 |
| Dhanuhikhera | 184 | 2,760 |
| Bhatkherwa Khurd | 39.6 | 159 |
| Bhatkherwa Kalan | 67.8 | 846 |
| Pankhupur | 94.9 | 44 |
| Ratuakhera | 98.5 | 29 |
| Manpur Gair Ahtmali | 374.5 | 38 |
| Pasniyan Khera | 163.2 | 277 |
| Manpurahtmali | 91.4 | 0 |
