= Asehru =

- Village
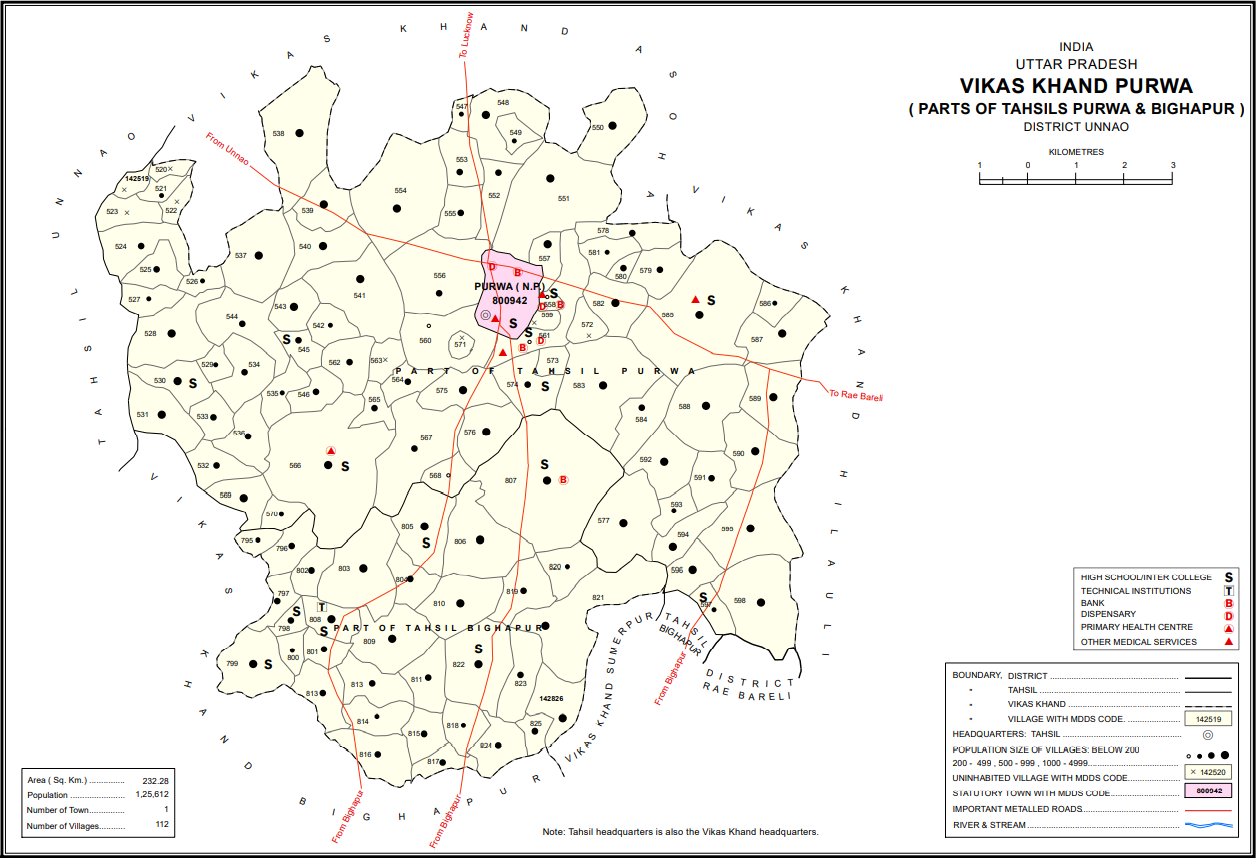
- Map showing Asehru (#557) in Purwa CD block

- Location in Uttar Pradesh, India
- Coordinates: 26.469325°N 80.792397°E
- Country India: India
- State: Uttar Pradesh
- District: Unnao

Area
  - Total: 2.897 km^{2} (1.119 sq mi)

Population (2011)
  - Total: 1,361
  - Density: 469.8/km^{2} (1,217/sq mi)

Languages
  - Official: Hindi
- Time zone: UTC+5:30 (IST)
- Vehicle registration: UP-35

Asehru is a village in Purwa block of Unnao district, Uttar Pradesh, India. It is not connected to major district roads and has one primary school and no healthcare facilities. As of 2011, its population is 1,361, in 268 households.

The 1961 census recorded Asehru as comprising 1 hamlet, with a total population of 540 (289 male and 251 female), in 105 households and 96 physical houses. The area of the village was given as 752 acres.
