= Nand Dulare Bajpai =

Indian literary critic (1906–1967)

Acharya Nand Dulare Bajpai
- Born: 27 August 1906; Magrair, Unnao
- Died: 21 August 1967
- Occupation: Critic

Nand Dulare Bajpai (1906 – 1967) was an Indian Hindi literary critic, editor, and academic. Considered one of the leading figures in Hindi literary criticism after Ramchandra Shukla, he is credited with providing in-depth analysis that elevated the status of Chhayavada within Hindi literature. Over his career, he served in key academic roles, including Head of the Hindi Department at Sagar University and Vice-Chancellor of Vikram University.

== Early life and education ==
Bajpai was born in 1906 in Magrail, located in Unnao district. His father was well-versed in Hindi literature and introduced him to the subject at an early age.

He pursued higher education at Banaras Hindu University (BHU), earning his Master of Arts degree in 1929 while securing first rank. He was a close student of the Hindi scholar Shyamsundar Das, under whose guidance and encouragement he conducted research work at BHU.

== Career ==
In 1932, Bajpai assumed the role of editor for Bharat, a daily publication based in Allahabad. During his tenure, he wrote critical essays on modern literature, which were later collected into books such as Hindi Sahitya: Veesvi Shatabdi and Jayshankar Prasad (1938).

Starting in 1936, he worked with the Nagari Pracharini Sabha in Varanasi on a two-volume compilation of Surdas's compositions titled Sursagar, published in 1948 and 1950. Beginning in 1937, he spent two years at Gita Press in Gorakhpur editing Tulsidas's epic poem Ramcharitmanas. He also served for a time as the editor of the Hindi quarterly journal Alochana.

In teaching and administration, Bajpai served as a professor of Hindi at Banaras Hindu University from 1941 to 1946. He subsequently joined Sagar University as Head of the Hindi Department, serving from 1947 to 1965. Later in his career, he was appointed Vice-Chancellor of Vikram University in Ujjain.

== Legacy and literary works ==
Bajpai contributed extensively to research in Hindi literature. Under his guidance, numerous researchers earned advanced qualifications, including Ph.D. and D.Litt. degrees.

In 1940, he presided over a branch session of the Hindi Sahitya Sammelan in Pune. He maintained a close relationship with the poet Suryakant Tripathi 'Nirala'.

His critical works include:

- Jayshankar Prasad (1938)
- Premchand
- Surdas
- Aadhunik Sahitya (1950)
- Naya Sahitya Naye Prashna (1955)
- Rashtrabhashaki Samasyaen
- Rashtriya Sahitya tatha Anya Nibandh

A critical study evaluating his life and works, titled Nanddulare Bajpayee : Vyaktitva aur Krititva, was edited by Dr. Ramadhar Sharma.

== Editorial duties ==
- Bharat, 1930–33
- Soor Sagar, 1933–36
- Ram Charit Manas, 1937–39

== Publications ==
- 'Hindi Sahitya'
- 'Biiswin Shatabdi'
- 'Kavi Nirala'
- 'Kavi Prasad'
- 'Maha Kavi Tulsidas'
