= Maharajpur, Unnao =

Maharajpur Mahārājpur
- Village
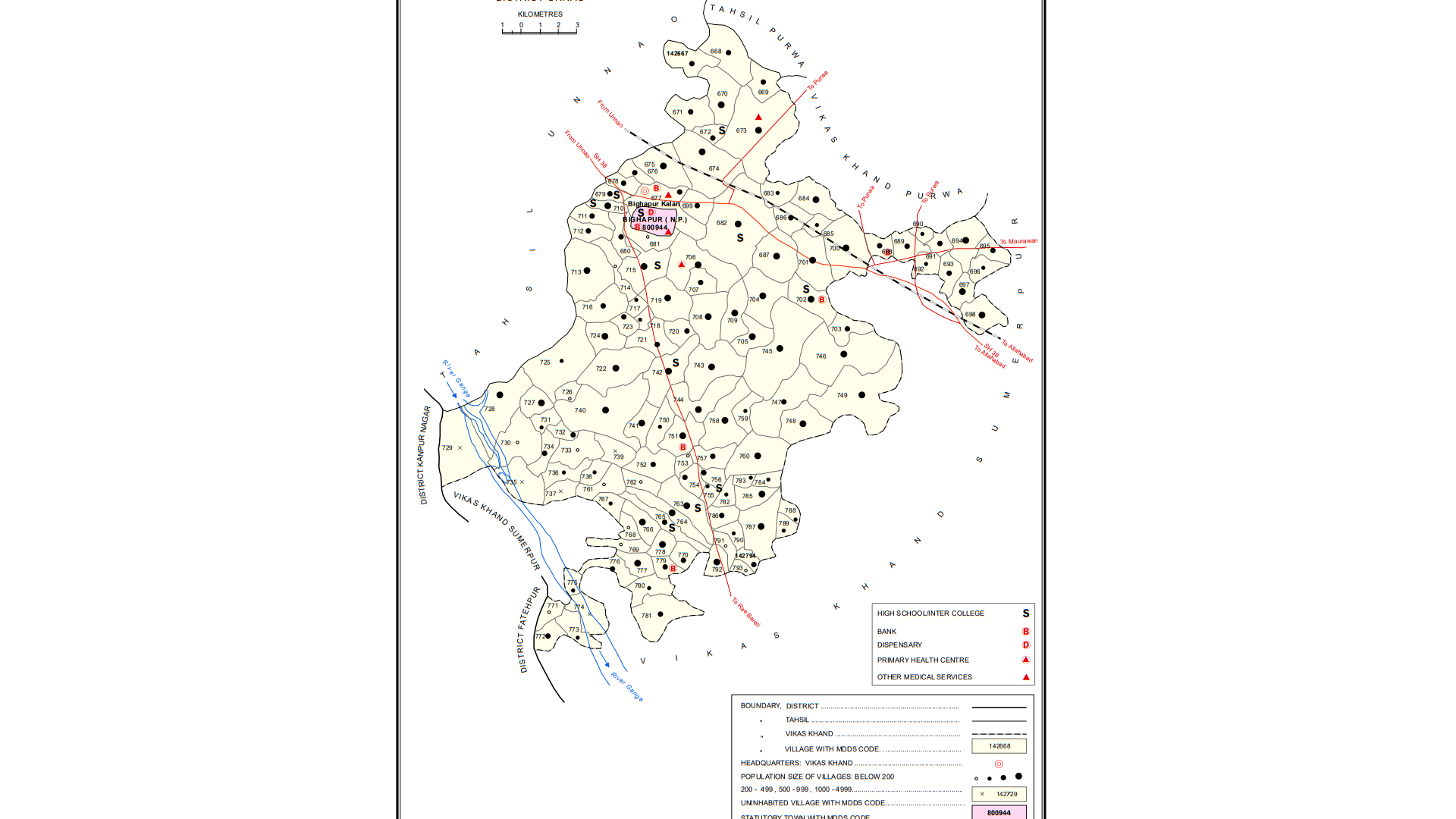
- Map showing Maharajpur (#695) in Bighapur CD block

- Location in Uttar Pradesh, India
- Coordinates: 26.331913°N 80.800938°E
- Country India: India
- State: Uttar Pradesh
- District: Unnao

Area
  - Total: 0.554 km^{2} (0.214 sq mi)

Population (2011)
  - Total: 592
  - Density: 1,070/km^{2} (2,770/sq mi)

Languages
  - Official: Hindi
- Time zone: UTC+5:30 (IST)
- Vehicle registration: UP-35

Maharajpur is a village in Bighapur block of Unnao district, Uttar Pradesh, India. As of 2011, its population is 592, in 151 households, and it has one primary school and no healthcare facilities.

The 1961 census recorded Maharajpur as comprising 1 hamlet, with a total population of 333 (163 male and 170 female), in 70 households and 68 physical houses. The area of the village was given as 139 acres.
