= Mirmau =

Mirmau Mīrmau
- Village
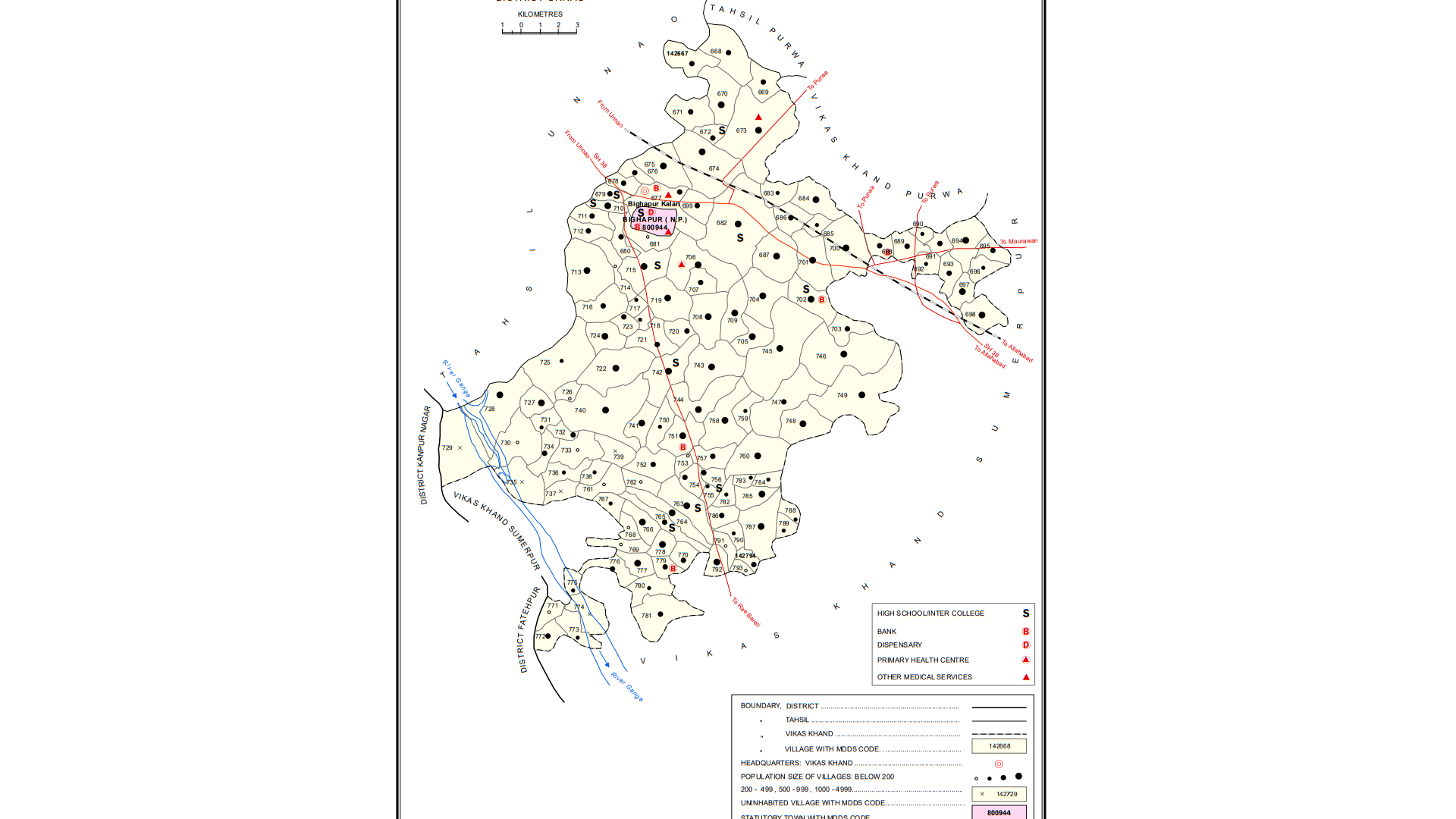
- Map showing Mirmau (#691) in Bighapur CD block

- Location in Uttar Pradesh, India
- Coordinates: 26.332643°N 80.780779°E
- Country India: India
- State: Uttar Pradesh
- District: Unnao

Area
  - Total: 0.64 km^{2} (0.25 sq mi)

Population (2011)
  - Total: 813
  - Density: 1,300/km^{2} (3,300/sq mi)

Languages
  - Official: Hindi
- Time zone: UTC+5:30 (IST)
- Vehicle registration: UP-35

Mirmau is a village in Bighapur block of Unnao district, Uttar Pradesh, India. As of 2011, its population is 813, in 159 households, and it has one primary school and no healthcare facilities.

The 1961 census recorded Mirmau (as "Mrimau") as comprising 1 hamlet, with a total population of 235 (121 male and 114 female), in 69 households and 69 physical houses. The area of the village was given as 160 acres.
