= Tikar Khurd =

- Village
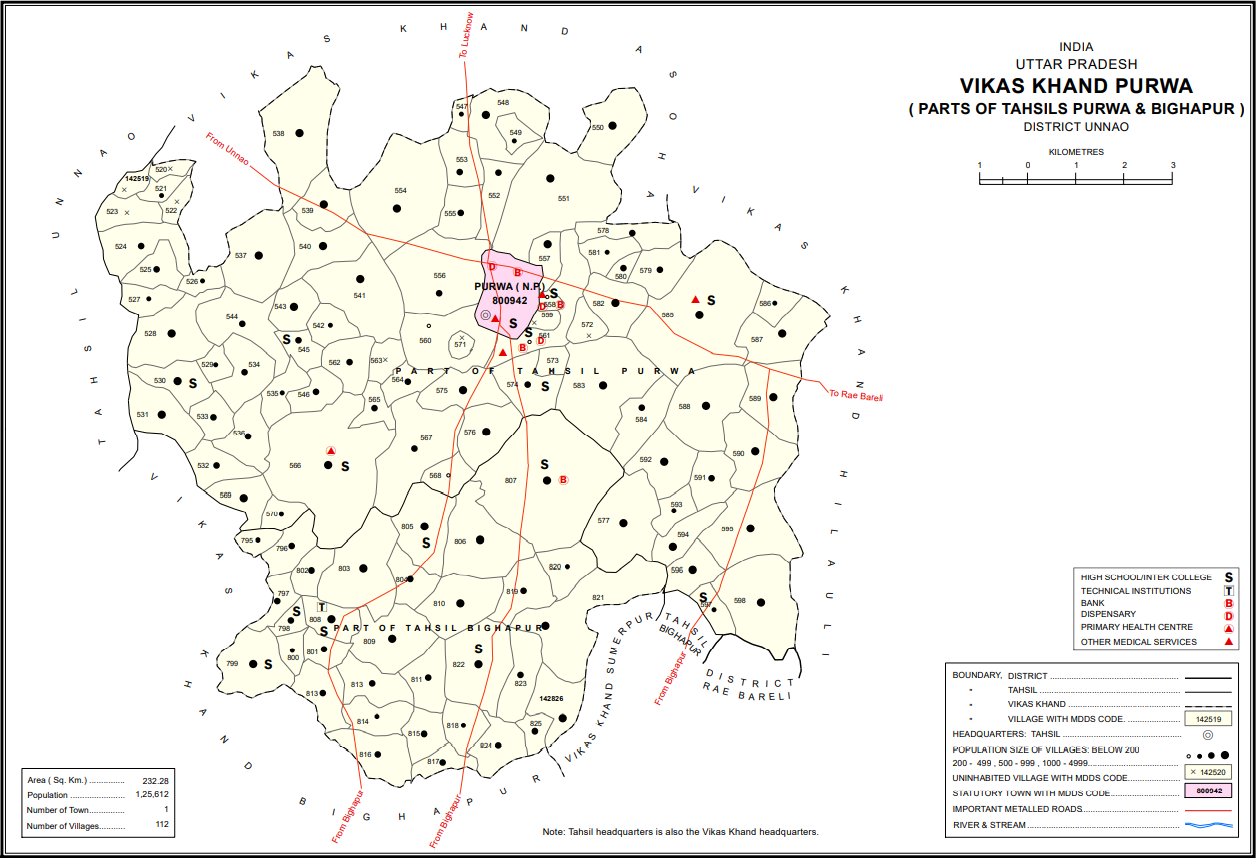
- Map showing Tikar Khurd (#575) in Purwa CD block

- Location in Uttar Pradesh, India
- Coordinates: 26.436732°N 80.773546°E
- Country India: India
- State: Uttar Pradesh
- District: Unnao

Area
  - Total: 2.059 km^{2} (0.795 sq mi)

Population (2011)
  - Total: 1,086
  - Density: 527.4/km^{2} (1,366/sq mi)

Languages
  - Official: Hindi
- Time zone: UTC+5:30 (IST)
- Vehicle registration: UP-35

Tikar Khurd is a village in Purwa block of Unnao district, Uttar Pradesh, India. It is not connected to major district roads and has two primary schools and no healthcare facilities. As of 2011, its population is 1,086, in 201 households.

The 1961 census recorded Tikar Khurd as comprising 1 hamlet, with a total population of 265 (145 male and 120 female), in 44 households and 44 physical houses. The area of the village was given as 540 acres.
