= Kukri Peneplain =

Antarctic landform

Coordinates: 84°52′43″S 174°17′50″W

The Kukri Peneplain is a near-horizontal and flat unconformity in the Transantarctic Mountains. The peneplain formed by erosion of the granitic and metamorphic basement rocks during the Paleozoic (Silurian to Devonian). Kukri Peneplain dips gently to the west.
