= Jagat Khera =

- Village
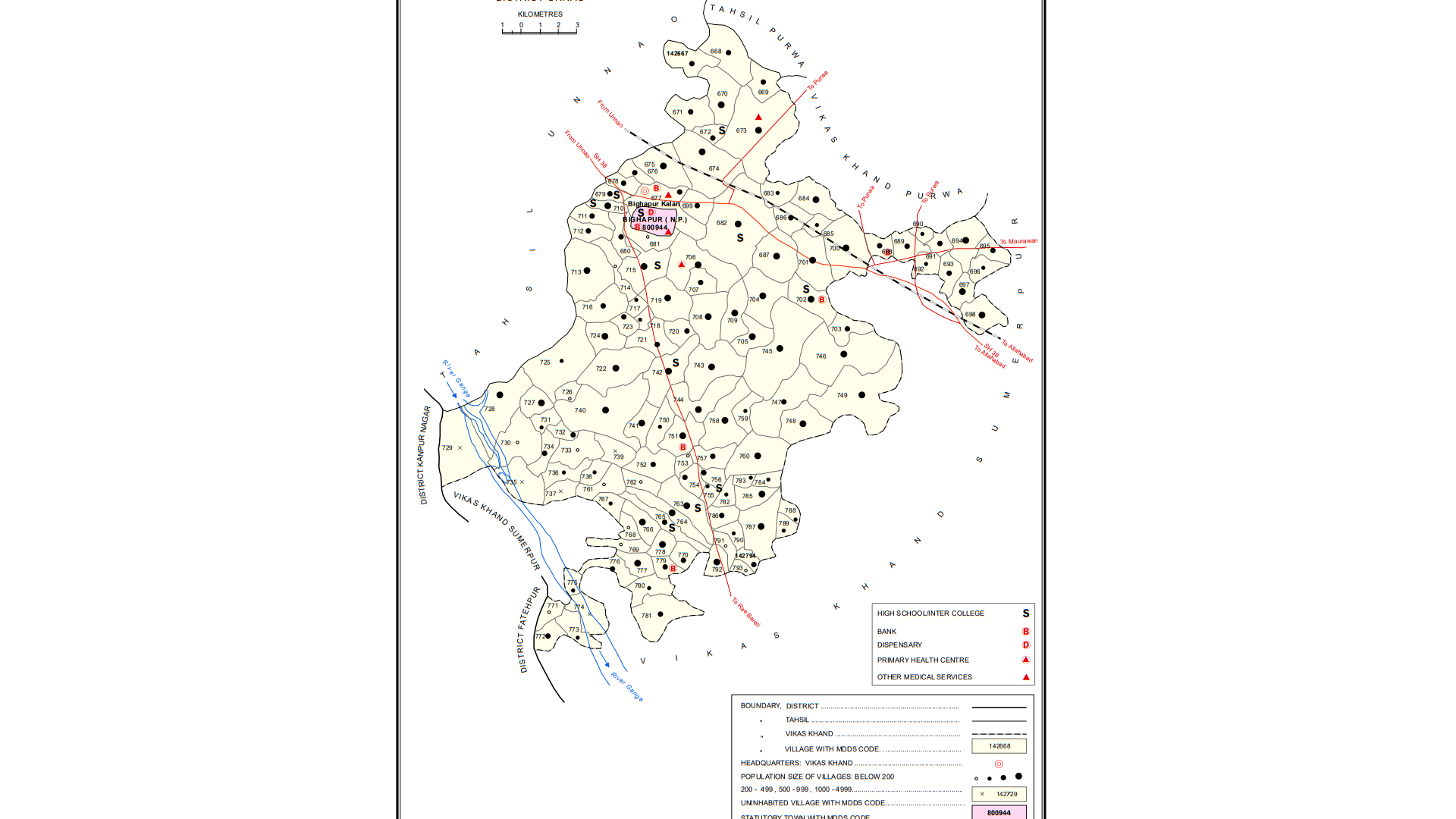
- Map showing Jagat Khera (#688) in Bighapur CD block

- Location in Uttar Pradesh, India
- Coordinates: 26.33399°N 80.757946°E
- Country India: India
- State: Uttar Pradesh
- District: Unnao

Area
  - Total: 1.337 km^{2} (0.516 sq mi)

Population (2011)
  - Total: 646
  - Density: 483/km^{2} (1,250/sq mi)

Languages
  - Official: Hindi
- Time zone: UTC+5:30 (IST)
- Vehicle registration: UP-35

Jagat Khera is a village in Bighapur block of Unnao district, Uttar Pradesh, India. As of 2011, its population is 646, in 125 households, and it has no schools and no healthcare facilities.

The 1961 census recorded Jagat Khera as comprising 1 hamlet, with a total population of 318 (179 male and 147 female), in 230 households and 208 physical houses. The area of the village was given as 215 acres.
