= Shukla Khera =

- Village
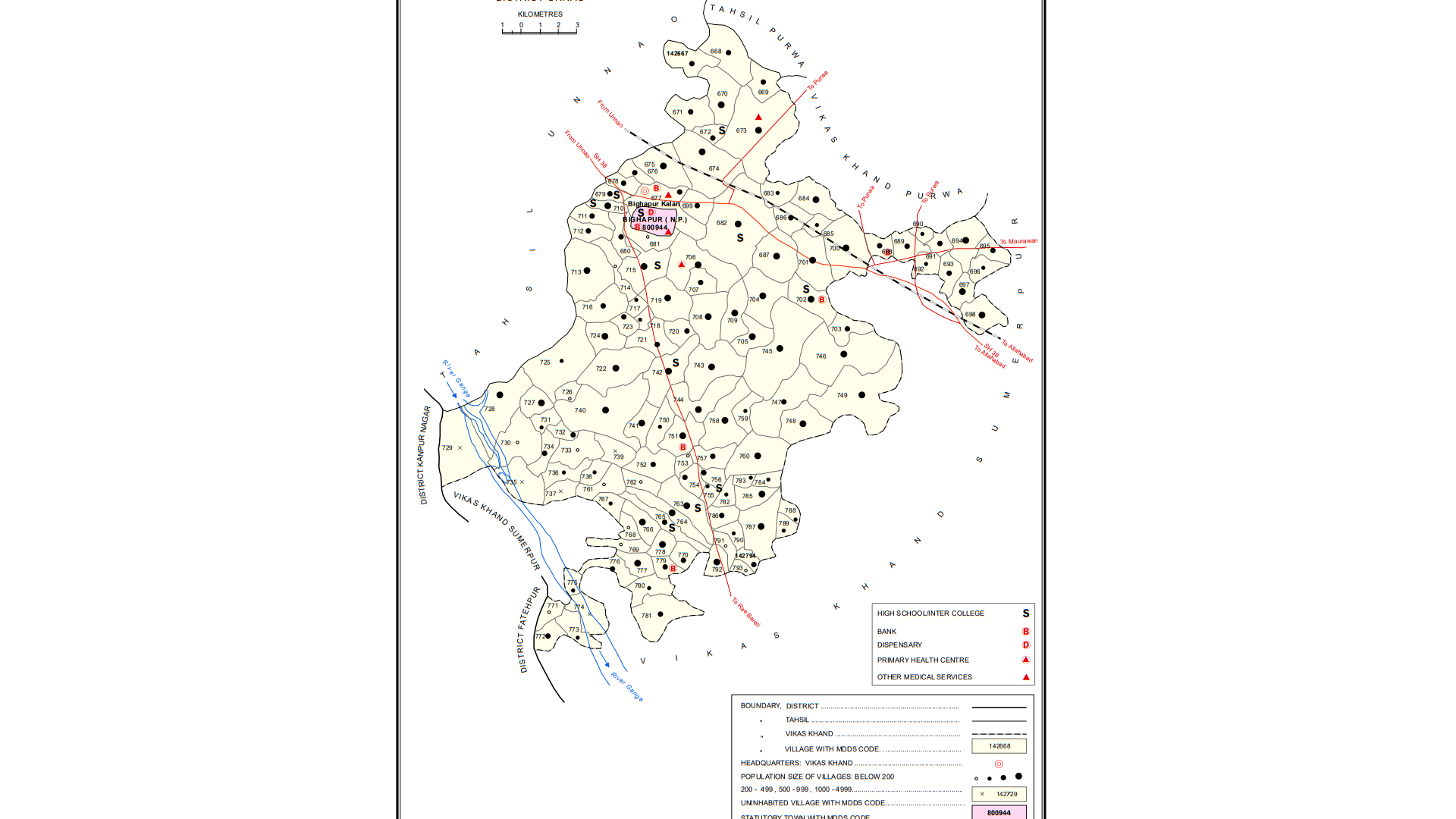
- Map showing Shukla Khera (#689) in Bighapur CD block

- Location in Uttar Pradesh, India
- Coordinates: 26.330441°N 80.765344°E
- Country India: India
- State: Uttar Pradesh
- District: Unnao

Area
  - Total: 1.31 km^{2} (0.51 sq mi)

Population (2011)
  - Total: 851
  - Density: 650/km^{2} (1,680/sq mi)

Languages
  - Official: Hindi
- Time zone: UTC+5:30 (IST)
- Vehicle registration: UP-35

Shukla Khera is a village in Bighapur block of Unnao district, Uttar Pradesh, India. As of 2011, its population is 851, in 203 households, and it has one primary school and no healthcare facilities.

The 1961 census recorded Shukla Khera as comprising 1 hamlet, with a total population of 594 (289 male and 305 female), in 105 households and 96 physical houses. The area of the village was given as 326 acres. It had a medical practitioner and a post office at the time.
