= Sakiassie Ragee =

Inuk artist

- Born: 1924
- Died: 2003 (aged 78–79)

Sakiassie Ragee (1924–2003) was an Inuk artist. Ragee was born in the Northwest Territories.

His work is included in the collections of the National Gallery of Canada, the McMichael Canadian Art Collection and the Art Gallery of Guelph.
