= Tikar Kalan =

Tikar Kalan Tikar Kalān
- Village
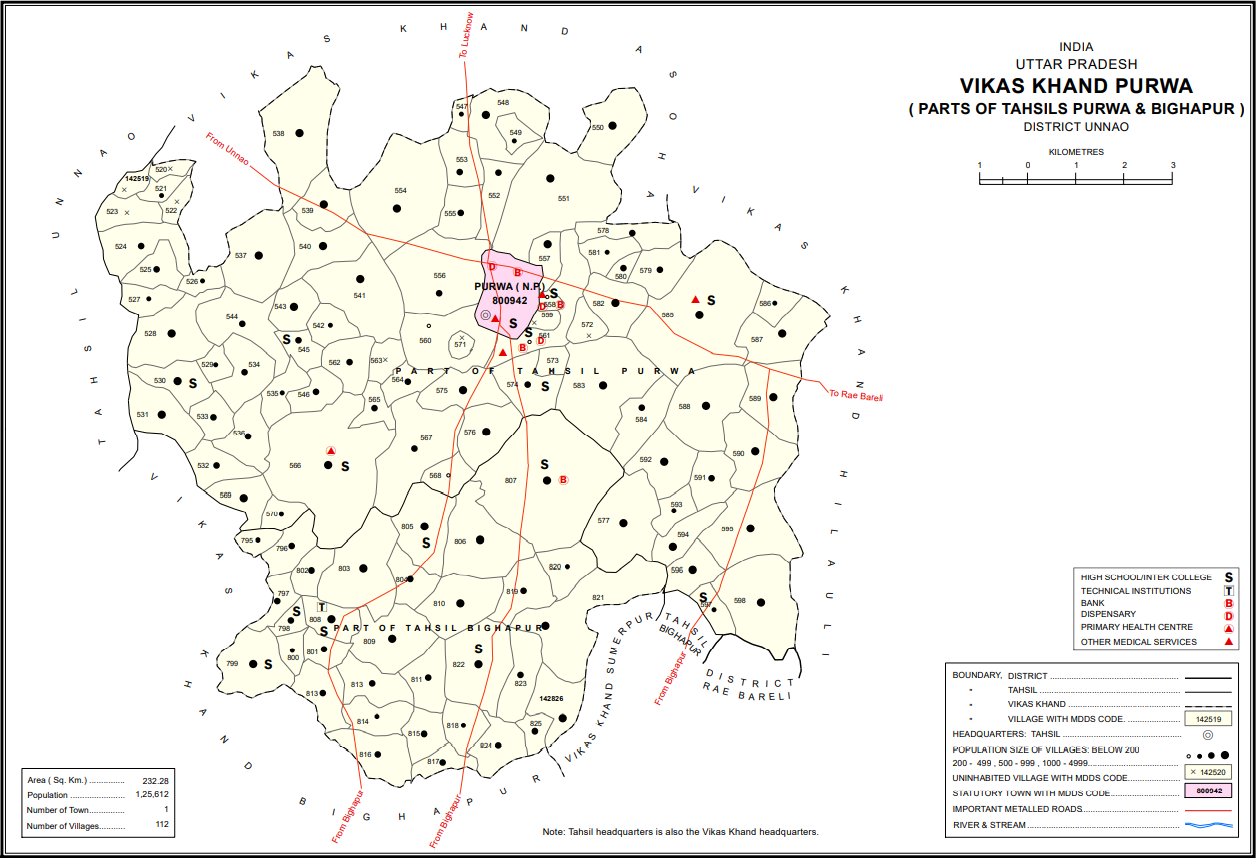
- Map showing Tikar Kalan (#576) in Purwa CD block

- Location in Uttar Pradesh, India
- Coordinates: 26.427481°N 80.772586°E
- Country India: India
- State: Uttar Pradesh
- District: Unnao

Area
  - Total: 3.113 km^{2} (1.202 sq mi)

Population (2011)
  - Total: 1,077
  - Density: 346.0/km^{2} (896.1/sq mi)

Languages
  - Official: Hindi
- Time zone: UTC+5:30 (IST)
- Vehicle registration: UP-35

Tikar Kalan is a village in Purwa block of Unnao district, Uttar Pradesh, India. It is connected to minor district roads and has one primary school and no healthcare facilities. As of 2011, its population is 1,077, in 211 households.

The 1961 census recorded Tikar Kalan as comprising 1 hamlet, with a total population of 495 (256 male and 239 female), in 85 households and 80 physical houses. The area of the village was given as 770 acres.
