= Shukla, Bhopal =

Shukla
- village
- Location within Madhya Pradesh Location within India
- Coordinates: 23.671548°N 77.296785°E
- Country: India
- State: Madhya Pradesh
- District: Bhopal
- Tehsil: Berasia

Population (2011)
  - Total: 361
- Time zone: UTC+5:30 (IST)
- ISO 3166 code: MP-IN
- Census code: 482127

Shukla is a village in the Bhopal district of Madhya Pradesh, India. It is located in the Berasia tehsil.

== Demographics ==
According to the 2011 census of India, Shukla has 76 households. The effective literacy rate (i.e. the literacy rate of population excluding children aged 6 and below) is 47.87%.

Demographics (2011 Census)
	Total	Male	Female
Population	361	193	168
Children aged below 6 years	56	39	17
Scheduled caste	3	2	1
Scheduled tribe	5	1	4
Literates	146	78	68
Workers (all)	225	118	107
Main workers (total)	116	77	39
Main workers: Cultivators	70	60	10
Main workers: Agricultural labourers	37	12	25
Main workers: Household industry workers	0	0	0
Main workers: Other	9	5	4
Marginal workers (total)	109	41	68
Marginal workers: Cultivators	4	2	2
Marginal workers: Agricultural labourers	102	36	66
Marginal workers: Household industry workers	0	0	0
Marginal workers: Others	3	3	0
Non-workers	136	75	61
