= Fatehganj, Unnao =

Fatehganj
- Village
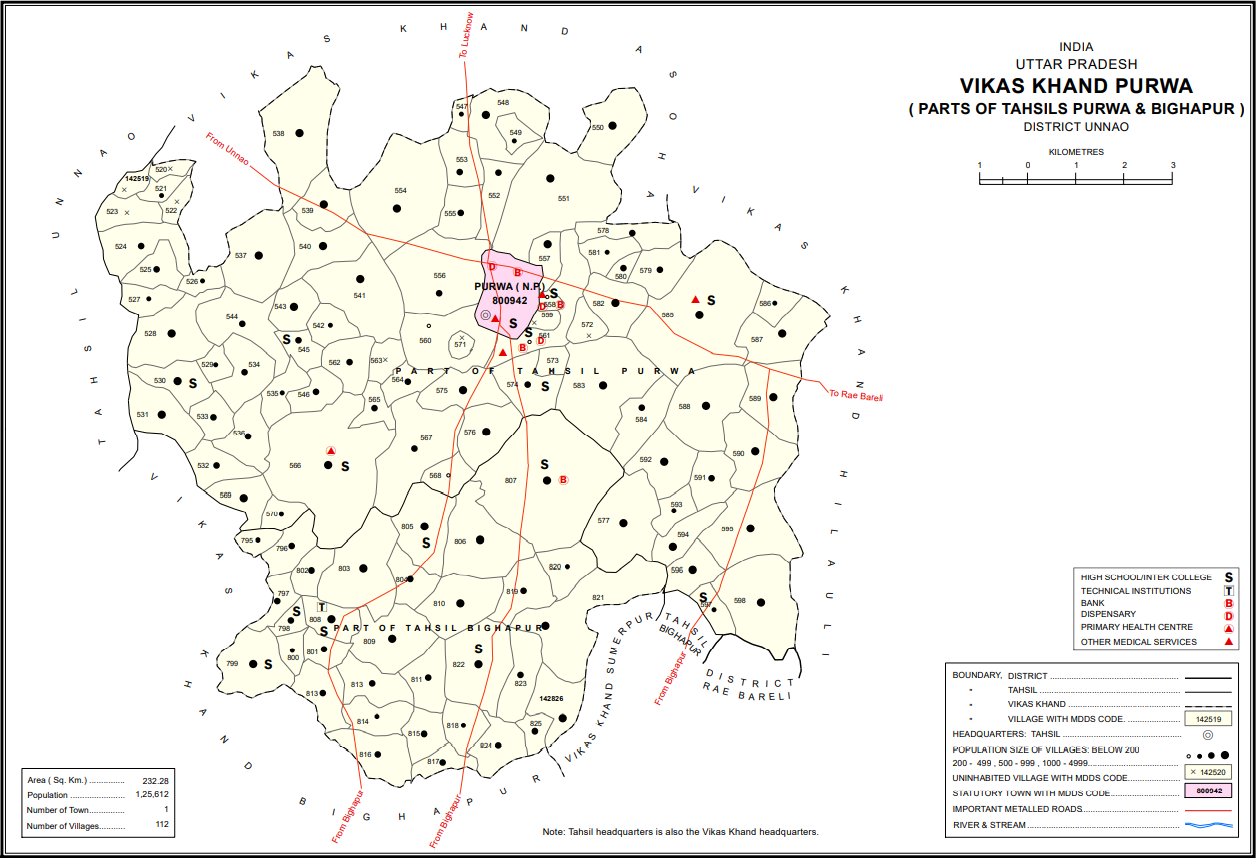
- Map showing Fatehganj (#552) in Purwa CD block

- Location in Uttar Pradesh, India
- Coordinates: 26.479063°N 80.777463°E
- Country India: India
- State: Uttar Pradesh
- District: Unnao

Area
  - Total: 1.62 km^{2} (0.63 sq mi)

Population (2011)
  - Total: 798
  - Density: 493/km^{2} (1,280/sq mi)

Languages
  - Official: Hindi
- Time zone: UTC+5:30 (IST)
- Vehicle registration: UP-35

Fatehganj is a village in Purwa block of Unnao district, Uttar Pradesh, India. It is located on a major district road and has one primary school and no healthcare facilities. As of 2011, its population is 798, in 245 households.

Fatehganj was founded by Fateh Ali, originally a favourite slave of Almas Ali Khwaja Sarai; Fateh Ali also established a garden and masonry tank in the city of Lucknow, and had trees planted along the Purwa-Basha and Lucknow-Jalalabad roads.

The 1961 census recorded Fatehganj as comprising 6 hamlets, with a total population of 262 people (132 male and 130 female), in 80 households and 76 physical houses. The area of the village was given as 408 acres.
