= Fatehganj Purvi =

- Town
- Location in Uttar Pradesh, India Fatehganj Purvi (India)
- Coordinates: 28°04′45″N 79°38′00″E
- Country: India
- State: Uttar Pradesh
- District: Bareilly

Population (2001)
  - Total: 7,706

Languages
  - Official: Hindi
- Time zone: UTC+5:30 (IST)
- Vehicle registration: UP 25
- Website: npfatehganjpurvi.in

Fatehganj Purvi (or Fatehganj East) is a town and a nagar panchayat in Bareilly district in the state of Uttar Pradesh, India. It is situated on the NH-30 and is served by Bilpur railway station.

== Demographics ==
As of 2001 India census, Fatehganj Purvi had a population of 7,706. Males constituted 54% of the population and females 46%. Fatehganj Purvi has an average literacy rate of 63%, lower than the national average of 74%: male literacy is 79%, and female literacy is 54%. In Fatehganj Purvi, 14% of the population is under 6 years of age.
