= Kukri, Unnao =

Kukri
- Village
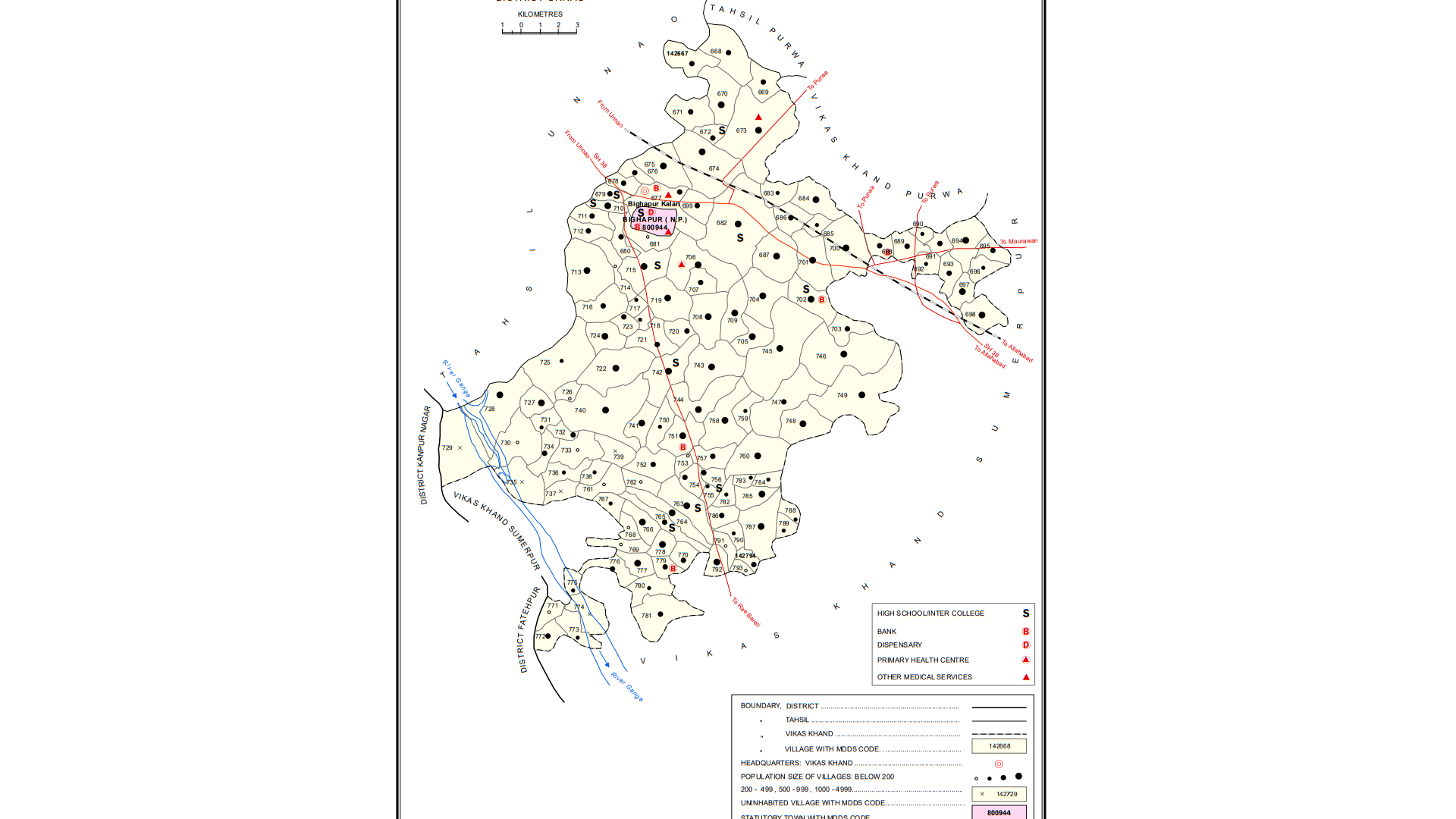
- Map showing Kukri (#690) in Bighapur CD block

- Location in Uttar Pradesh, India
- Coordinates: 26.339489°N 80.772891°E
- Country India: India
- State: Uttar Pradesh
- District: Unnao

Area
  - Total: 0.797 km^{2} (0.308 sq mi)

Population (2011)
  - Total: 471
  - Density: 591/km^{2} (1,530/sq mi)

Languages
  - Official: Hindi
- Time zone: UTC+5:30 (IST)
- Vehicle registration: UP-35

Kukri is a village in Bighapur block of Unnao district, Uttar Pradesh, India. As of 2011, its population is 471, in 93 households, and it has one primary school and no healthcare facilities.

The 1961 census recorded Kukri (as "Kukari") as comprising 1 hamlet, with a total population of 251 (119 male and 132 female), in 42 households and 42 physical houses. The area of the village was given as 199 acres.
