= Daila =

Daila is a given name. Notable people with the name include:

- Daila Dameno (born 1968), Italian para-archer, para-alpine skier and para-swimmer
- Daila Ismatul (born 2002), Guatemalan swimmer

== See also ==
- Dalia (disambiguation)
