= Terha =

Village in Uttar Pradesh, India

Coordinates: 25°50′N 80°15′E

Terha Terha
- Village
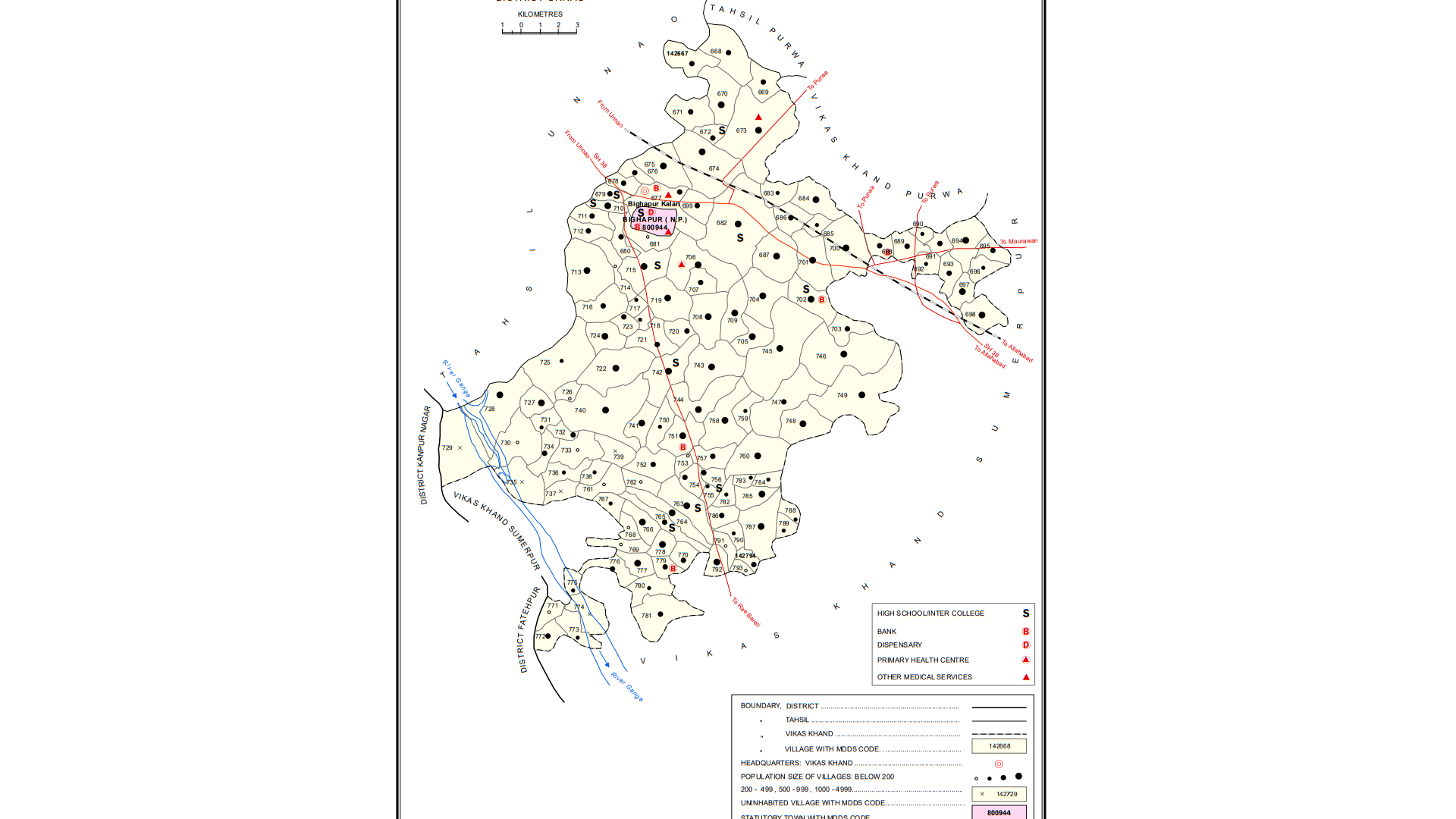
- Map showing Terha (#742) in Bighapur CD block

- Location in Uttar Pradesh, India
- Country India: India
- State: Uttar Pradesh
- District: Unnao

Area
  - Total: 3.73 km^{2} (1.44 sq mi)

Population (2011)
  - Total: 3,909
  - Density: 1,050/km^{2} (2,710/sq mi)

Languages
  - Official: Hindi
- Time zone: UTC+5:30 (IST)
- Vehicle registration: UP-35

Terha is a village and gram panchayat in Unnao district, Uttar Pradesh, India. Terha holds a market twice per week, on Sundays and Thursdays, and the main items of trade are gur, vegetables, and cloths. As of 2011, the population of Terha is 3,909, in 759 households, and it has one primary school and no healthcare facilities.

The 1961 census recorded Terha as comprising 3 hamlets, with a total population of 2,423 (1,214 male and 1,209 female), in 474 households and 472 physical houses. The area of the village was given as 1,008 acres. Average attendance of the biweekly market was listed as around 1,000 people. The Hublal Inter College in Terha, founded in 1949, was in 1961 recorded as having a faculty of 13 teachers (all male) and a student body of 265 (also all male). The village had the following small industrial establishments: 1 producer of edible fats/oils, 1 garment manufacturer, 4 bicycle repair shops, and 6 miscellaneous manufacturer/repairers. It also had a medical practitioner and a post office at the time.
