= Loni River =

Seasonal river in Prayagraj district, Uttar Pradesh, India

The Loni River is a seasonal river located in the Shankargarh block of Prayagraj district in the Indian state of Uttar Pradesh. It stretches over a length of 32.5 kilometers and passes through 14 gram panchayats. It is known as the lifeline of Shankargarh.

== Environmental efforts ==
In 2023, the Uttar Pradesh government announced a revival project for the Loni River under the Mahatma Gandhi National Rural Employment Guarantee Act (MNREGA), with a budget allocation of ₹1.5 crore. The project includes desilting, embankment repair, plantation drives, and removing encroachments to restore natural flow.

This effort is part of a broader initiative to rejuvenate small rivers in the Prayagraj region, including Belan, Bakrahi, Sevarahi, and Ghaghar.

== Significance ==
Although small, the Loni River plays a crucial role in local water management and supports agriculture during the monsoon season. It also aids groundwater recharge in the Shankargarh region.

== See also ==
- Gomti River
- Sai River
