= Fatehganj =

- Suburb
- Country: India
- State: Uttar Pradesh
- Established: 1780
- Founder: Fateh Bhadur Singh

Government
  - Type: Nagar Nigam
- Elevation: 1,346 m (4,416 ft)

Population (2011)
  - Total: 85,985
  - Rank: 2

Languages
  - Official: Hindi, Awadhi, English
- Time zone: UTC+5:30 (IST)
- PIN: 204001
- Vehicle registration: UP 42
- Sex ratio: 1000/999 ♂/♀
- Website: up.gov.in

Fatehganj is a suburb in Ayodhya city, in the Ayodhya district of Uttar Pradesh, India.

== Demographics ==
As of 2011 India census, Rikabganj had a population of 85,990. Males constitute 51% of the population and females 49%. Fatehganj has an average literacy rate of 62%, higher than the national average of 59.5%: male literacy is 71%, and female literacy is 52%. In Fatehganj, 17% of the population is under 6 years of age.

Religions in Fatehganj
Religion	Percent
Hindus	80%
Muslims	10%
Jains	7%
Others†	3%
Distribution of religions †Includes Sikhs (0%), Buddhists (<0%).
