= Mirri =

Mirri may refer to:

- Mirri Kalan, a village in Unnao district, Uttar Pradesh, India
- Mirri Khurd, a village in Unnao district, Uttar Pradesh, India
- Mirri Lobo (born 1960), Cape Verdean musical artist
- Roberto Mirri (born 1978), Italian footballer

== See also ==
- Mirrie Hill OBE (1889–1986), Australian composer
