= Pipri (disambiguation) =

Pipri is a town and a nagar panchayat in Sonbhadra district, Uttar Pradesh, India.

Pipri may also refer to the following places in India:

- Pipri, Asoha, a village in Asoha block of Unnao district, Uttar Pradesh
- Pipri, Lucknow, a village in Bakshi Ka Talab block of Lucknow district, Uttar Pradesh
- Pipri, Raebareli, in Shivgarh block of Rae Bareli district, Uttar Pradesh
