= Bachhaura, Asoha =

Bachhaura
- Village
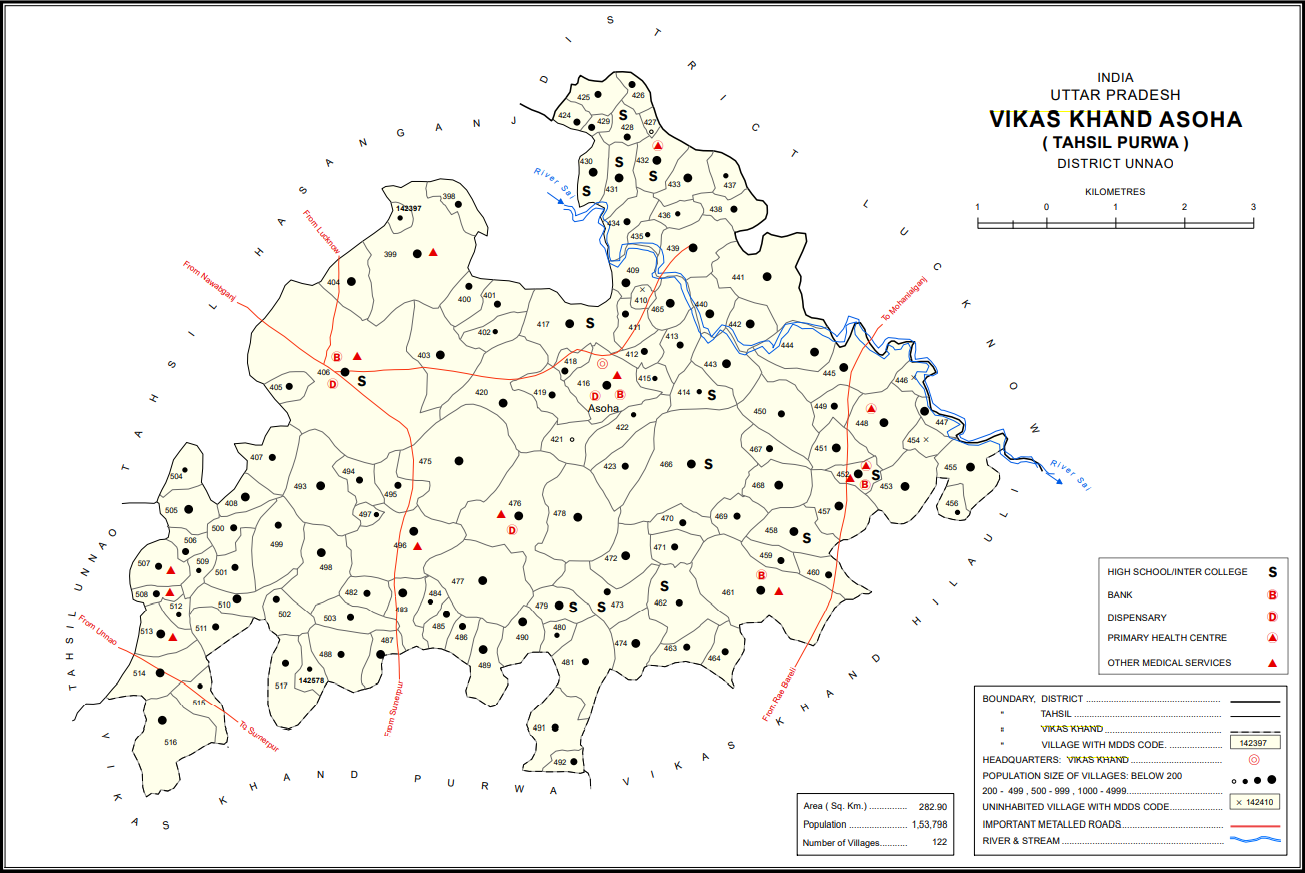
- Map showing Bachhaura (#493) in Asoha CD block

- Location in Uttar Pradesh, India
- Coordinates: 26.547496°N 80.750419°E
- Country India: India
- State: Uttar Pradesh
- District: Unnao

Area
  - Total: 312.2 km^{2} (120.5 sq mi)

Population (2011)
  - Total: 1,802
  - Density: 5.772/km^{2} (14.95/sq mi)

Languages
  - Official: Hindi
- Time zone: UTC+5:30 (IST)
- Vehicle registration: UP-35

Bachhaura is a village in Asoha block of Unnao district, Uttar Pradesh, India. It has one primary school and no healthcare facilities. As of 2011, its population is 1,802, in 348 households.

The 1961 census recorded Bachhaura (under the spelling "Bachoura") as comprising 2 hamlets, with a total population of 706 (372 male and 334 female), in 139 households and 101 physical houses. The area of the village was given as 627 acres.
