= Asoha =

Asoha Asohā
- Village
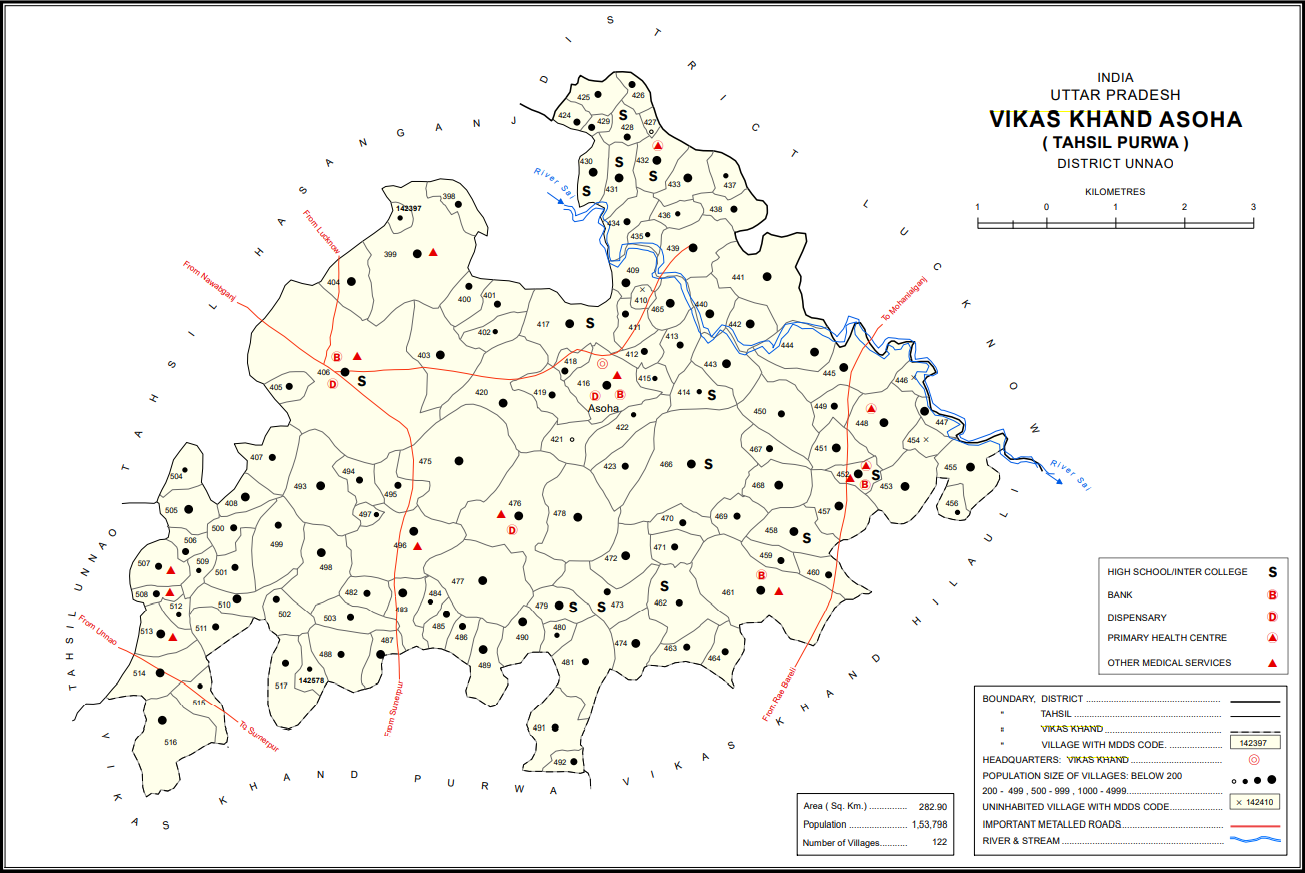
- Map of Asoha CD block

- Location in Uttar Pradesh, India
- Coordinates: 26.585593°N 80.83518°E
- Country India: India
- State: Uttar Pradesh
- District: Unnao

Area
  - Total: 3.375 km^{2} (1.303 sq mi)

Population (2011)
  - Total: 3,709
  - Density: 1,099/km^{2} (2,846/sq mi)

Languages
  - Official: Hindi
- Time zone: UTC+5:30 (IST)
- Vehicle registration: UP-35

Asoha is a village in Purwa tehsil of Unnao district, Uttar Pradesh, India. It is located about 16 km north of Purwa, the tehsil headquarters, and 51 km east of Unnao, the district headquarters. The main crops grown here are wheat, barley, gram, juwar, paddy, and pulses, and irrigation is provided by a canal as well as by tanks. The soil here is mostly clay. As of 2011, the population of Asoha is 3,709, in 856 households.

Asoha is the headquarters of a community development block, which was first inaugurated on 1 July 1956 in order to oversee implementation of India's Five-Year Plans at a local and rural level. As of 2011, the block comprises 122 rural villages (including Asoha itself), with a total population of 153,798 people in 30,885 households. Asoha is also the headquarters of a nyaya panchayat.

== History ==
According to C.A. Elliott, the name "Asoha" is derived from that of Ashwatthama, the figure in the Mahabharata, who is said to have rested here for a time after the murder of Draupadi's children. Asoha was historically the seat of a pargana, which is first attested during the reign of the Mughal emperor Akbar in the late 16th century. At the turn of the 20th century, Asoha had five temples, a police station, a cattle pound, and a primary school, as well as "unusually extensive" groves of mango and mahua trees.

The 1961 census recorded Asoha as comprising 4 hamlets, with a total population of 1,868 (981 male and 887 female), in 304 households and 286 physical houses. The area of the village was given as 861 acres. It had a police force of 1 sub-inspector, 1 head constable, and 13 constables at the time.

== Culture ==
A legendary figure named Astik is worshipped in Asoha. He is said to have been born during the Dvapara Yuga period, and that at the time of the great Sarpa Satra performed by Janamejaya, Astik received a boon from the serpent Takshak, who promised him that men bitten by snakes would recover if they took his name.

== Villages ==
Asoha CD block has the following 122 villages:

Village name	Total land area (hectares)	Population (in 2011)
Kashi Pur	54.8	300
Datauli	125.5	735
Saharawan	894.5	6,211
Keona	149.4	890
Keoni	182	653
Jagdish Pur	144.7	276
Sahabad Grant	400.2	1,475
Beekamau	216.8	1,235
Narsingh Pur	118.6	769
Kantha	2,155.1	9,973
Ratawar	227.4	871
Surja Pur	151.9	1,195
Saraiya	198	1,013
Chaktaliya Bhur	32.9	0
Islam Nagar	114.6	523
Newada	79.7	566
Nimaicha	115.9	607
Sikri	205.7	488
Ajai Pur	88.3	376
Asoha (block headquarters)	337.5	3,709
Pathak Pur	459	3,054
Malla Khera	67.9	555
Gadhi Karmali	202.6	881
Goshain Khera	487.5	1,199
Kushli Khera	209.7	107
Harnam Khera	252.9	347
Ismail Pur	257.9	882
Barha	72.5	638
Gyanpur	140.2	892
Makdumpur	41.3	540
Gaddipur	63.7	33
Darheta Achli	88.5	814
Darheta Mahant	75.2	627
Lachhi Pur	160.6	1,037
Pahar Pur	164.6	1,269
Ograpur	209.9	1,597
Chilauli	217.8	1,165
Gumapur	170.8	946
Pardamanpur	63.5	305
Kilpur	70.1	366
Godwa	102.8	330
Dundiyathar	163.8	798
Bilaura	325.2	2,388
Majharia	142.5	1,096
Chaupai	533.6	2,548
Nim Tikar	163.3	1,227
Semri	352.6	1,980
Utraura	240.4	1,281
Jabrela	451.4	3,004
Karam Semau	87.1	0
Soho	64	1,675
Pahasa	378	1,355
Beru	140.4	975
Muktey Mau	406.9	969
Chhiyantikur	147.8	1,562
Kalu Khera	101	1,888
Bhawalia	228.1	2,177
Bhur Pahas	99.6	0
Rampur	330.6	1,432
Rawat Khera	71.2	394
Kanchanpur	270	1,793
Maliha Garha	228.1	1,216
Anwarpur	119.6	707
Sandoli	146.5	665
Sarwan	795.5	3,824
Baraoli	302.2	894
Terhwa Babhna	152.2	749
Sarwara	129.9	715
Bhao Mau	176.6	1,125
Samadha	856.9	3,681
Sheo Garh	76.8	712
Sikhaiya	200.5	1,157
Barwa Khurd	183.6	693
Bhat Purwa	147.7	961
Gilshah Mau	135.9	689
Shah Pur	475.5	2,342
Mubarkpur	119.5	818
Pipri	224.8	1,777
Darsawan	473.7	3,074
Daun	714.6	2,743
Asawar	510.1	3,080
Zorawar Ganj	514.2	2,553
Jhakwasa	93.3	1,065
Raipura	64.7	308
Rahimanpur Jagdishpur	283.8	714
Saidpur	142.4	750
Abhusha	170.9	1,070
Chhavinath Khera	66.7	403
Mohammdpur	101.8	720
Ajaipur	90.5	617
Talhauri	137.5	1,373
Karauli	251.9	811
Madarpur/Narainpur	246.6	1,254
Ratwsiyana Madarpur	203.4	1,033
Dharampur	266.9	762
Tilokpur	115.2	900
Bachhaura	312.2	1,802
Sariya	141	973
Mirri Khurd	166.2	589
Mirri Kalan	627.1	5,622
Raiker	63.5	448
Bhadin	395	2,212
Manika Pur	251.6	685
Maidpur	161.3	954
Kudikapur	241.8	657
Dhannipur	171.3	759
Dhaurhara	147.7	787
Ibrahimpur	114.6	370
Chaitra	232.1	1,449
Rashidpur	100.3	785
Turi Raja Sahib	144.2	586
Turichhabinath	116.8	594
Raipur	68.7	364
Behta	199.5	1,423
Sumbhari Khurd	243.4	787
Raqba	46.8	284
Mangat Khera	220.7	1,329
Majhkuriya	74.6	1,470
Atarsai	311.2	317
Baigaon	267.9	3,212
Bachhrauli	202.3	949
Kakauha	78	445
