= Chaupai =

Chaupai may refer to:

- Chaupai (poetry), a style of medieval Hindi poetry
- Chaupai (Sikhism), a Sikh prayer
- Chaupai, Unnao, a village in Uttar Pradesh, India
