= Jhakwasa =

Jhakwasa Jhakwāsa
- Village
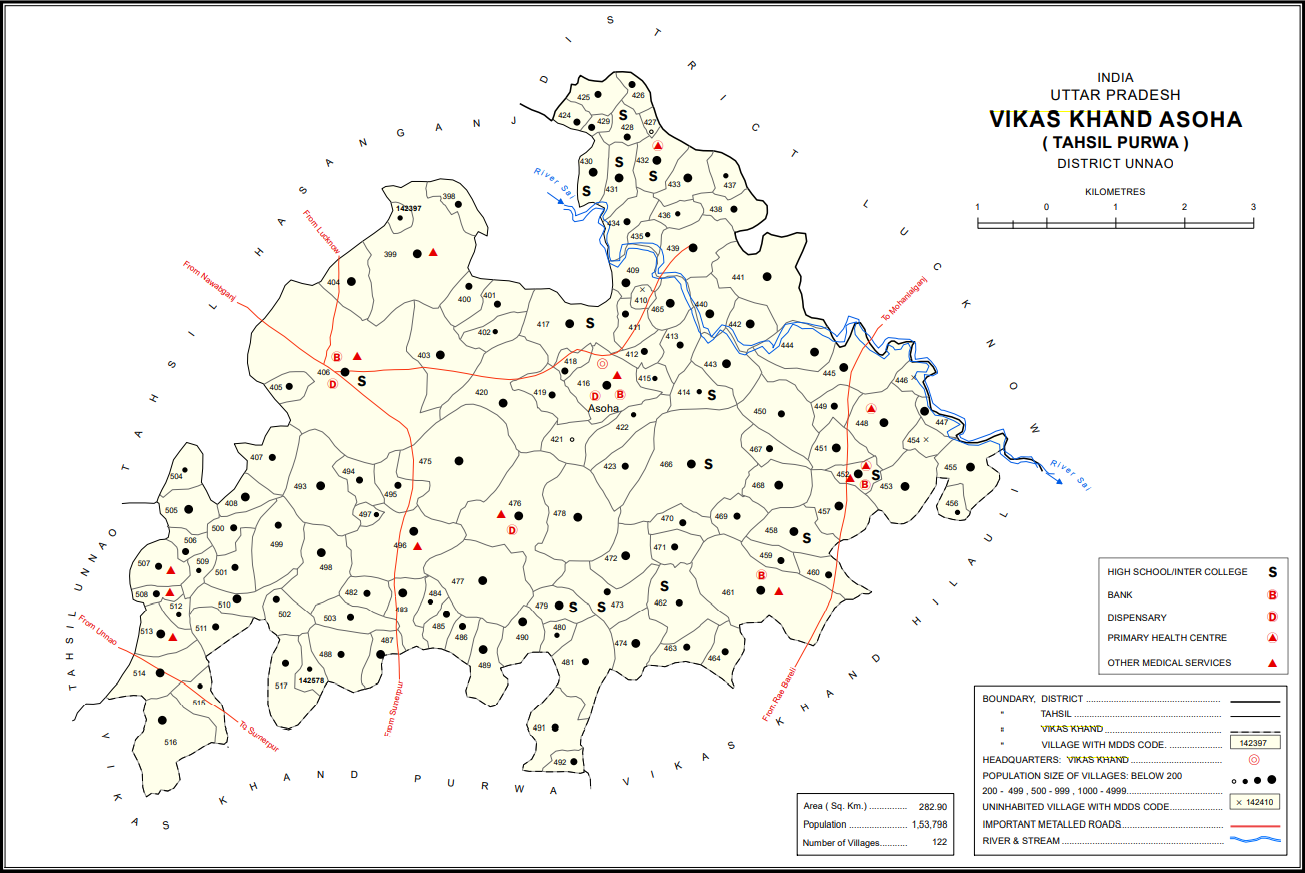
- Map showing Jhakwasa (#479) in Asoha CD block

- Location in Uttar Pradesh, India
- Coordinates: 26.516434°N 80.814773°E
- Country India: India
- State: Uttar Pradesh
- District: Unnao

Area
  - Total: 0.933 km^{2} (0.360 sq mi)

Population (2011)
  - Total: 1,065
  - Density: 1,140/km^{2} (2,960/sq mi)

Languages
  - Official: Hindi
- Time zone: UTC+5:30 (IST)
- Vehicle registration: UP-35

Jhakwasa is a village in Asoha block of Unnao district, Uttar Pradesh, India. It is not connected to major district roads and has two primary schools and no healthcare facilities. As of 2011, its population is 1,065, in 196 households.

The 1961 census recorded Jhakwasa as comprising 1 hamlet, with a total population of 507 (248 male and 259 female), in 102 households and 92 physical houses. The area of the village was given as 352 acres. It had a medical practitioner at the time. There was one small manufacturing establishment (classified as "other") in the village at the time.
