= Sarwara =

Sarwara Sarwāra
- Village
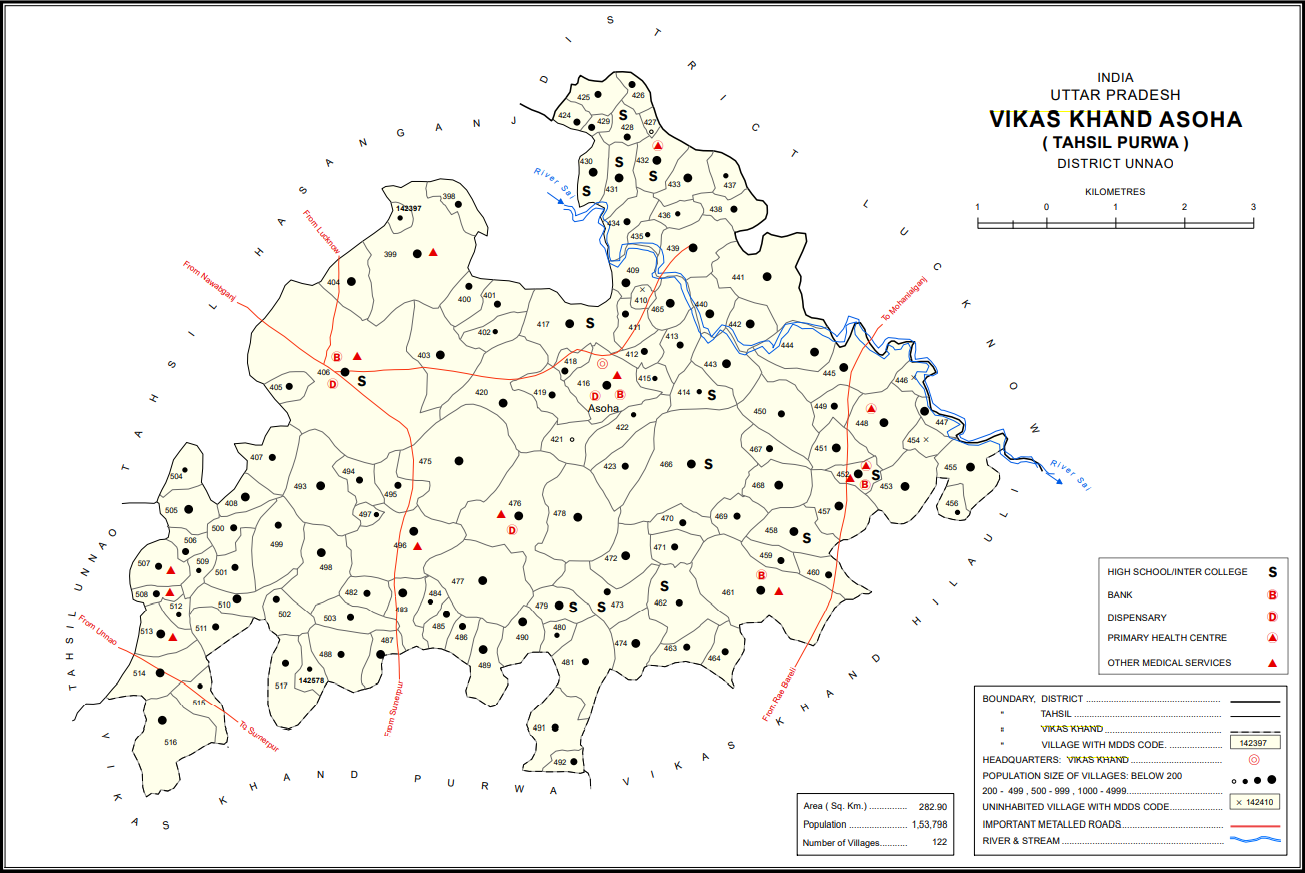
- Map showing Sarwara (#464) in Asoha CD block

- Location in Uttar Pradesh, India
- Coordinates: 26.503608°N 80.869896°E
- Country India: India
- State: Uttar Pradesh
- District: Unnao

Area
  - Total: 1.299 km^{2} (0.502 sq mi)

Population (2011)
  - Total: 715
  - Density: 550/km^{2} (1,430/sq mi)

Languages
  - Official: Hindi
- Time zone: UTC+5:30 (IST)
- Vehicle registration: UP-35

Sarwara is a village in Asoha block of Unnao district, Uttar Pradesh, India. It is not connected to major or minor district roads and has no schools and no healthcare facilities. As of 2011, its population is 715, in 148 households.

The 1961 census recorded Sarwara as comprising 1 hamlet, with a total population of 344 (189 male and 155 female), in 72 households and 68 physical houses. The area of the village was given as 219 acres.
