= Anwarpur, Unnao =

Anwarpur
- Village
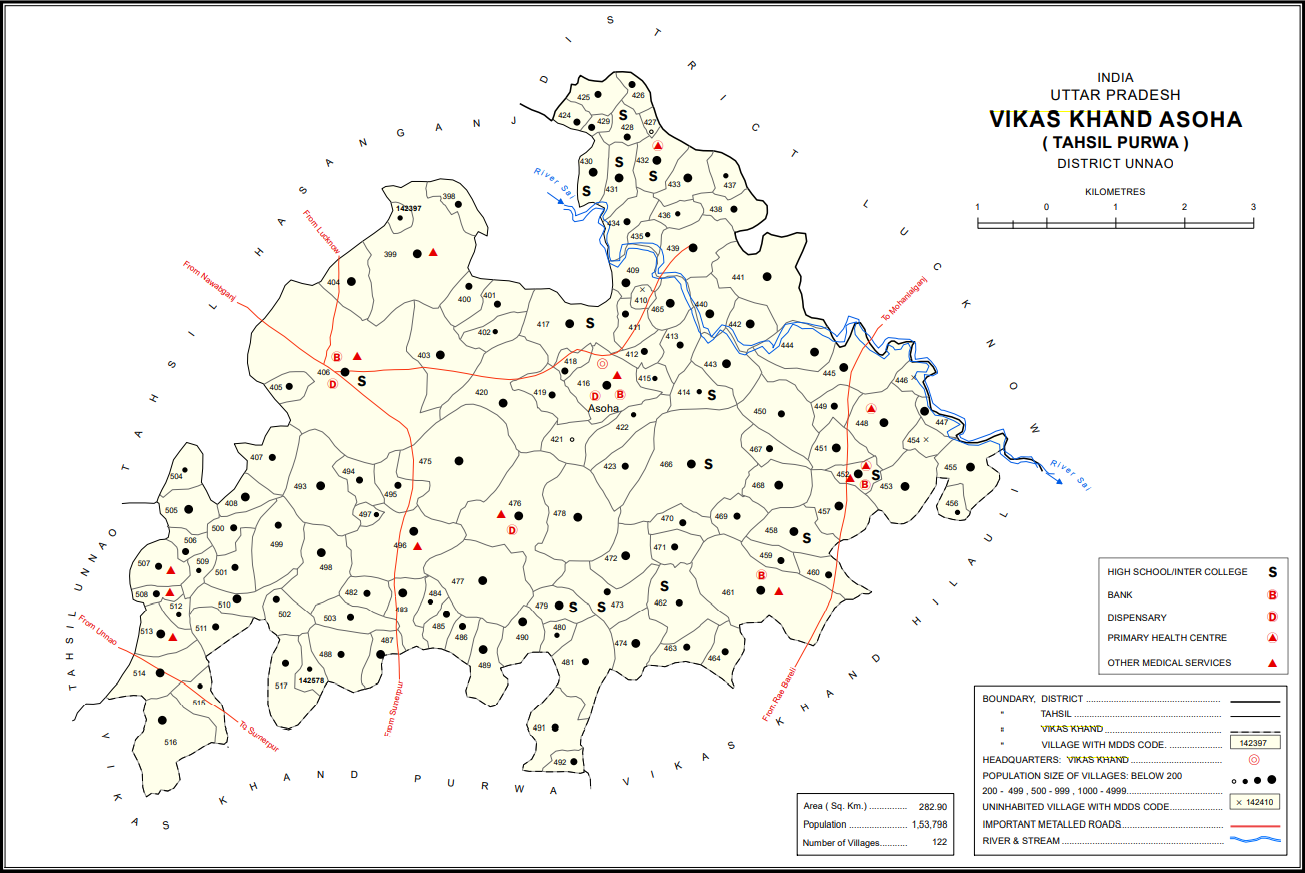
- Map showing Anwarpur (#459) in Asoha CD block

- Location in Uttar Pradesh, India
- Coordinates: 26.533599°N 80.88627°E
- Country India: India
- State: Uttar Pradesh
- District: Unnao

Area
  - Total: 1.196 km^{2} (0.462 sq mi)

Population (2011)
  - Total: 707
  - Density: 591/km^{2} (1,530/sq mi)

Languages
  - Official: Hindi
- Time zone: UTC+5:30 (IST)
- Vehicle registration: UP-35

Anwarpur is a village in Asoha block of Unnao district, Uttar Pradesh, India. It is not located on major district roads and has one primary school and no healthcare facilities. As of 2011, its population is 707, in 133 households.

The 1961 census recorded Anwarpur as comprising 1 hamlet, with a total population of 327 (175 male and 152 female), in 60 households and 58 physical houses. The area of the village was given as 312 acres.
