= Utraura =

- Village
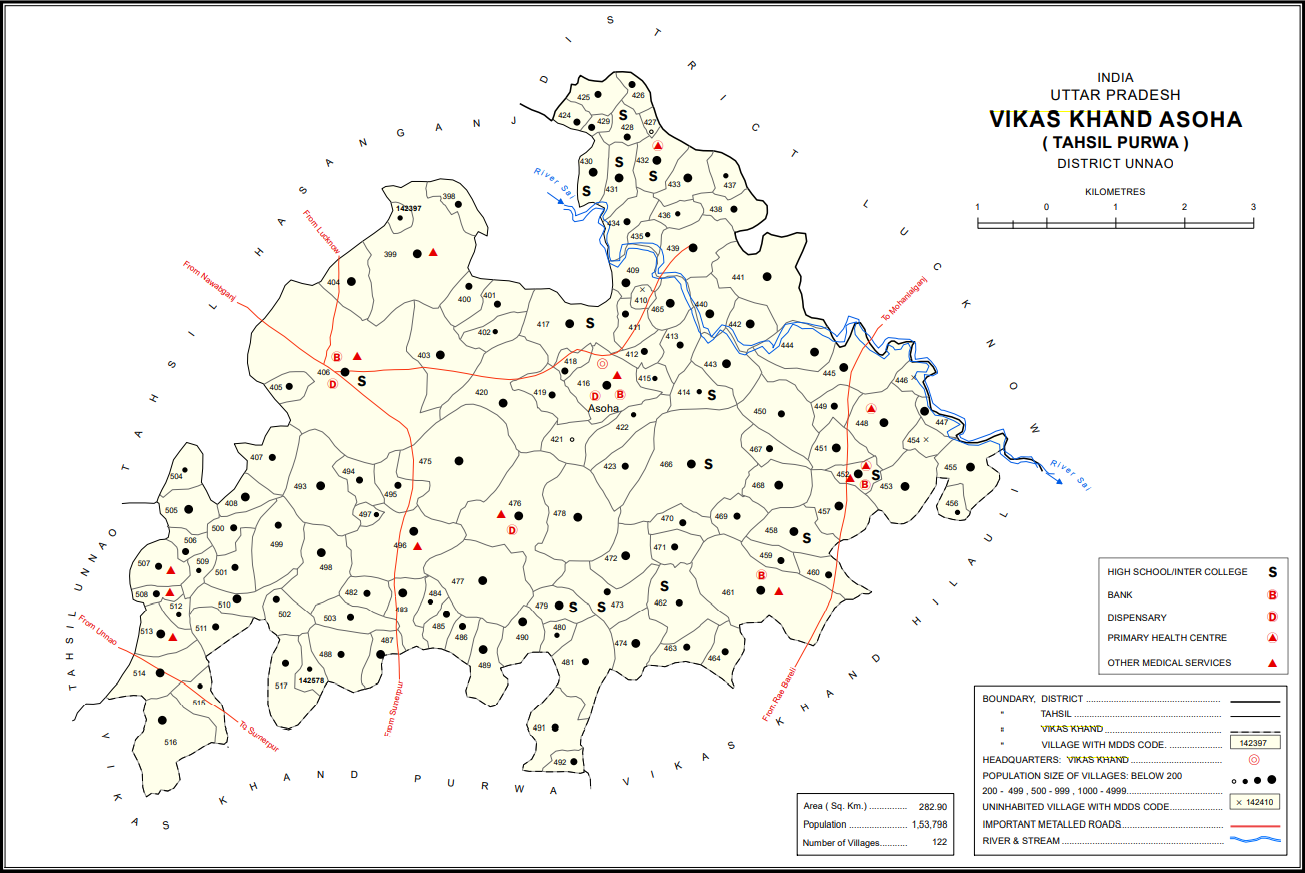
- Map showing Utraura (#444) in Asoha CD block

- Location in Uttar Pradesh, India
- Coordinates: 26.590217°N 80.898136°E
- Country India: India
- State: Uttar Pradesh
- District: Unnao

Area
  - Total: 2.404 km^{2} (0.928 sq mi)

Population (2011)
  - Total: 1,281
  - Density: 532.9/km^{2} (1,380/sq mi)

Languages
  - Official: Hindi
- Time zone: UTC+5:30 (IST)
- Vehicle registration: UP-35

Utraura is a village in Asoha block of Unnao district, Uttar Pradesh, India. It is not located on major district roads and has one primary school and no healthcare facilities. As of 2011, its population is 1,281, in 281 households.

The 1961 census recorded Utraura as comprising 2 hamlets, with a total population of 997 (522 male and 475 female), in 102 households and 92 physical houses. The area of the village was given as 582 acres. It had one small manufacturer of textiles as well as a small establishment classified as making jewellery or precious metal items.
