= Bikamau =

- Village
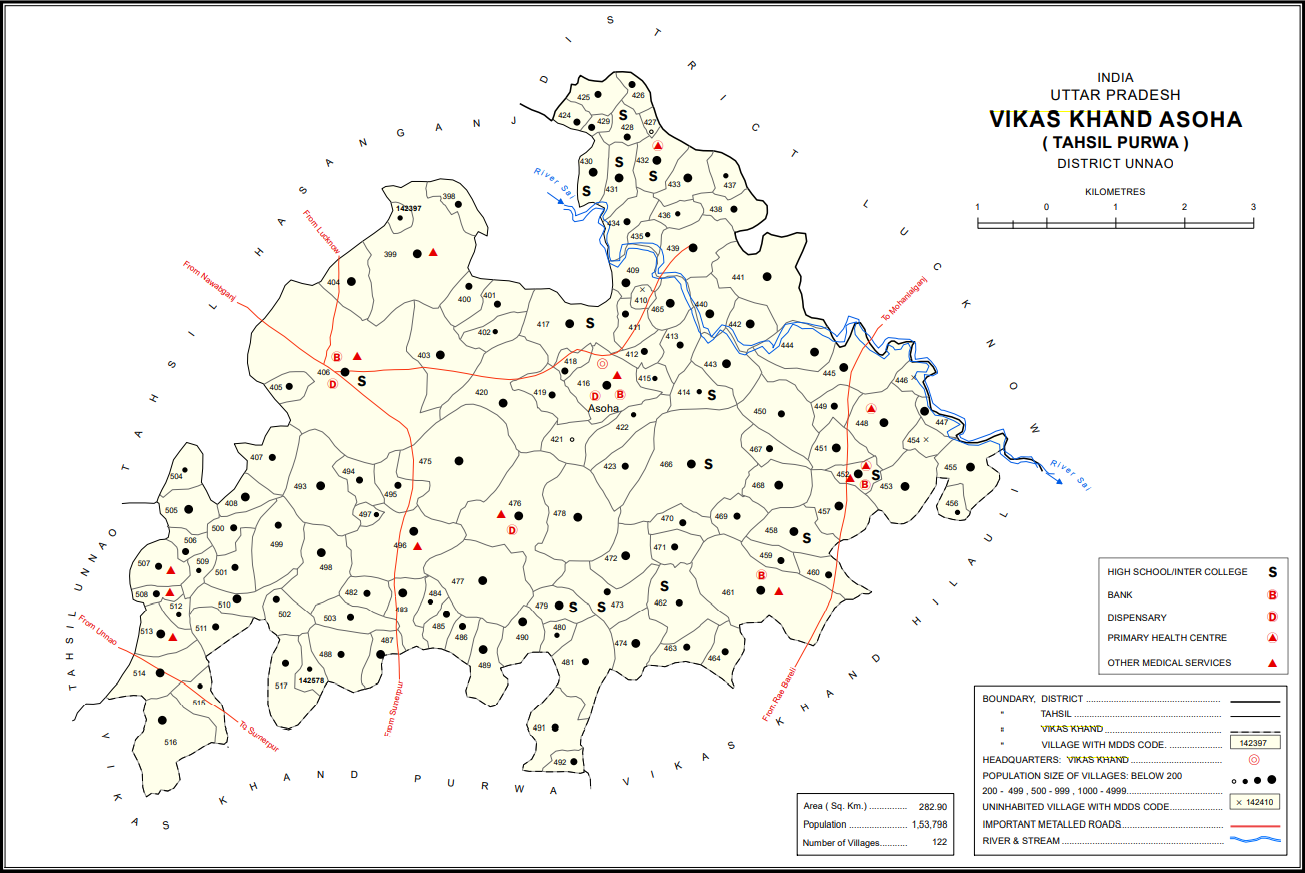
- Map showing Bikamau (#404) in Asoha CD block

- Location in Uttar Pradesh, India
- Coordinates: 26.61159°N 80.757968°E
- Country India: India
- State: Uttar Pradesh
- District: Unnao

Area
  - Total: 2.168 km^{2} (0.837 sq mi)

Population (2011)
  - Total: 1,235
  - Density: 569.6/km^{2} (1,475/sq mi)

Languages
  - Official: Hindi
- Time zone: UTC+5:30 (IST)
- Vehicle registration: UP-35

Bikamau is a village in Asoha block of Unnao district, Uttar Pradesh, India. It is not connected to major district roads and has one primary school and no healthcare facilities. As of 2011, its population is 1,235, in 246 households.

The 1961 census recorded Bikamau as comprising 1 hamlet, with a total population of 502 (242 male and 260 female), in 92 households and 91 physical houses. The area of the village was given as 535 acres.
