= Zorawarganj =

Zorawarganj Zorāwarganj
- Village
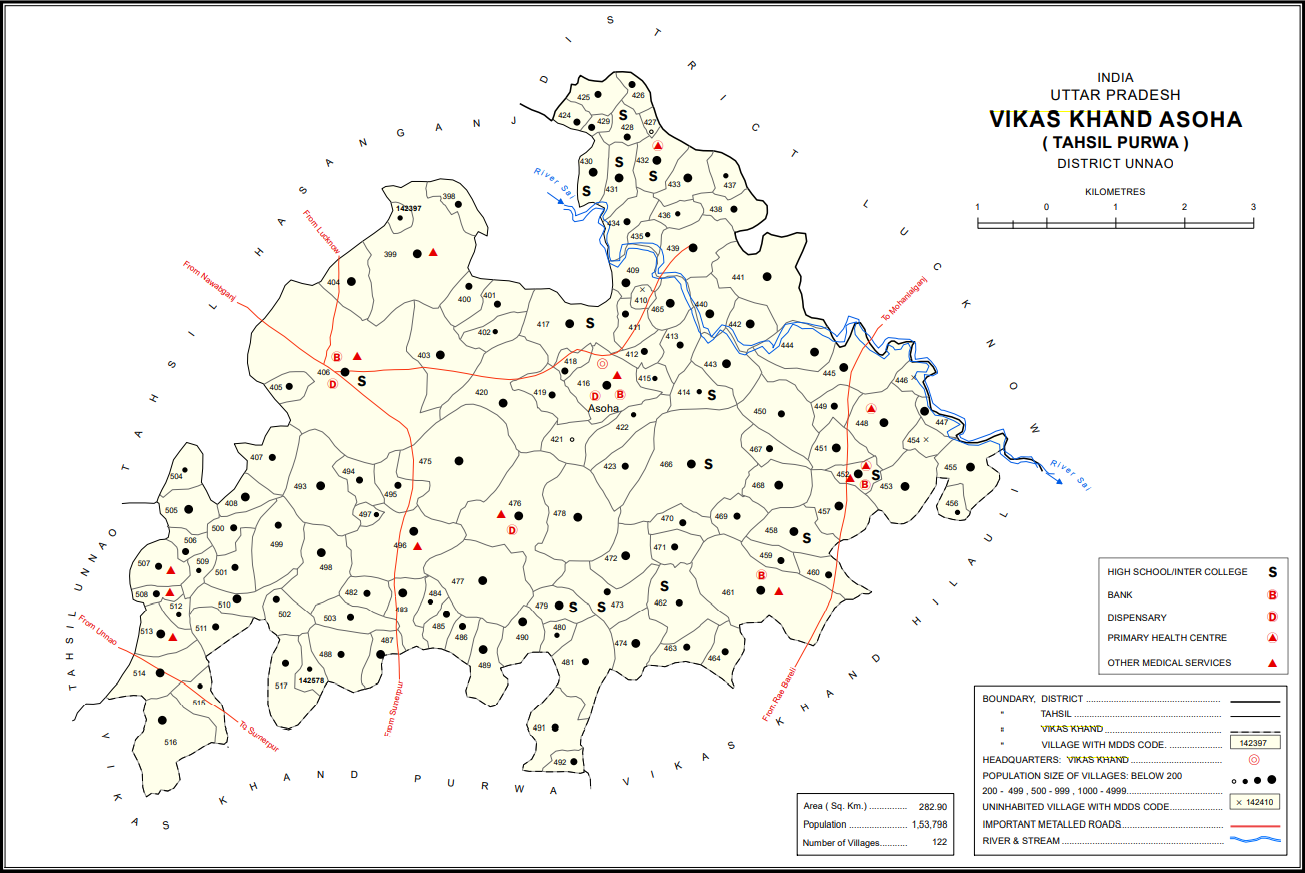
- Map showing Zorawarganj (#478) in Asoha CD block

- Location in Uttar Pradesh, India
- Coordinates: 26°31′57″N 80°49′22″E
- Country India: India
- State: Uttar Pradesh
- District: Unnao

Area
  - Total: 5.142 km^{2} (1.985 sq mi)

Population (2011)
  - Total: 2,553
  - Density: 496.5/km^{2} (1,286/sq mi)

Languages
  - Official: Hindi
- Time zone: UTC+5:30 (IST)
- Vehicle registration: UP-35

Zorawarganj is a village in Asoha block of Unnao district, Uttar Pradesh, India. It is not connected to major district roads and has two primary schools and no healthcare facilities. As of 2011, its population is 2,553, in 498 households.

The 1961 census recorded Zorawarganj as comprising 2 hamlets, with a total population of 914 (475 male and 439 female), in 189 households and 164 physical houses. The area of the village was given as 1,342 acres. It had a medical practitioner at the time. The village had one grain mill, two small manufacturers of textiles, and one manufacturer of items not otherwise specified.
