= Keoni =

Keoni Yolie Keonicho
- Village
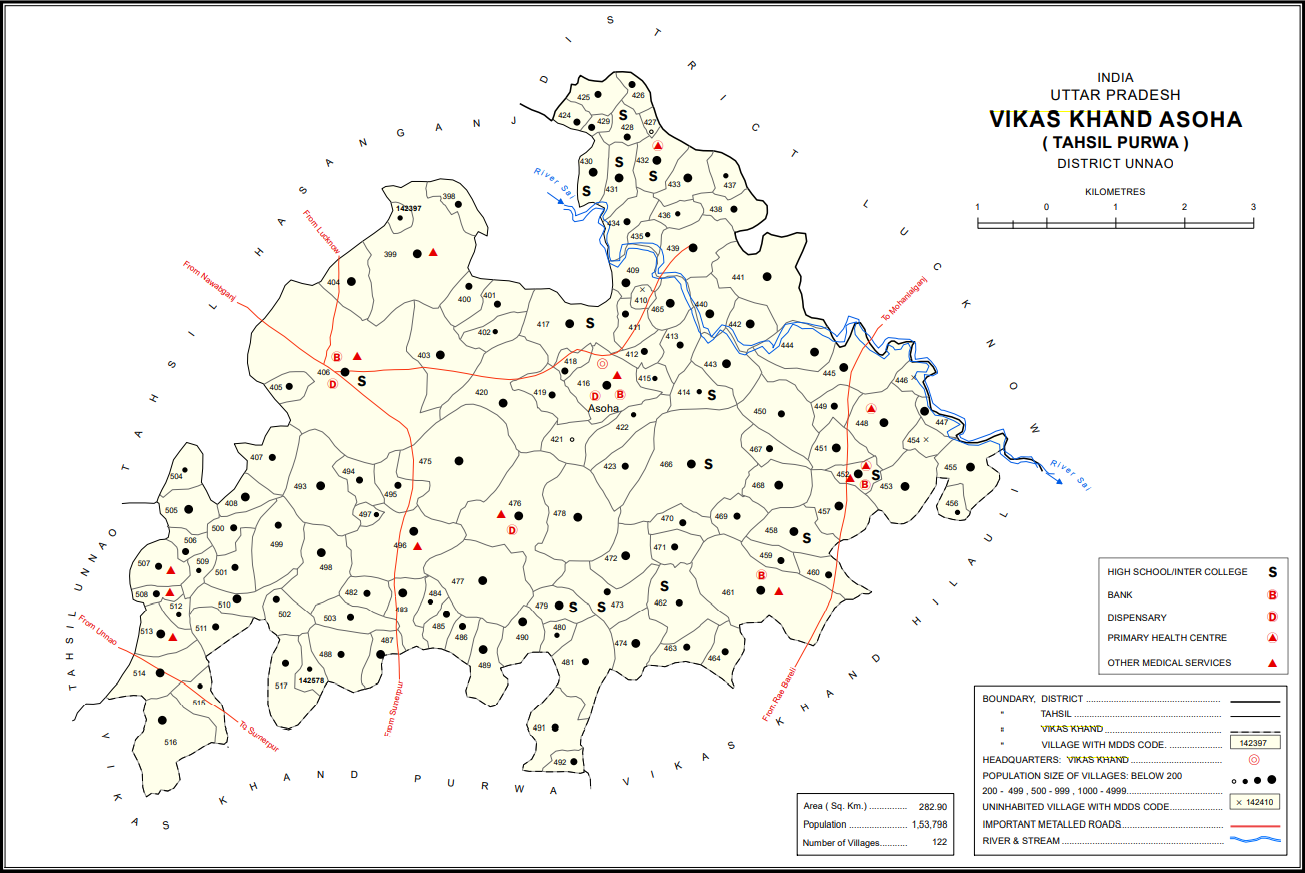
- Map showing Keoni (#401) in Asoha CD block

- Location in Uttar Pradesh, India
- Coordinates: 26.602151°N 80.799473°E
- Country India: India
- State: Uttar Pradesh
- District: Unnao

Area
  - Total: 1.82 km^{2} (0.70 sq mi)

Population (2011)
  - Total: 653
  - Density: 359/km^{2} (929/sq mi)

Languages
  - Official: Hindi
- Time zone: UTC+5:30 (IST)
- Vehicle registration: UP-35

Keoni is a village in Asoha block of Unnao district, Uttar Pradesh, India. It is not located on major district roads and has one primary school and no healthcare facilities. As of 2011, its population is 653, in 104 households.

The 1961 census recorded Keoni as comprising 1 hamlet, with a total population of 256 (147 male and 109 female), in 49 households and 40 physical houses. The area of the village was given as 458 acres. It had one grain mill at the time.
