= Kalu Khera =

Kalu Khera Kālu Khera
- Village
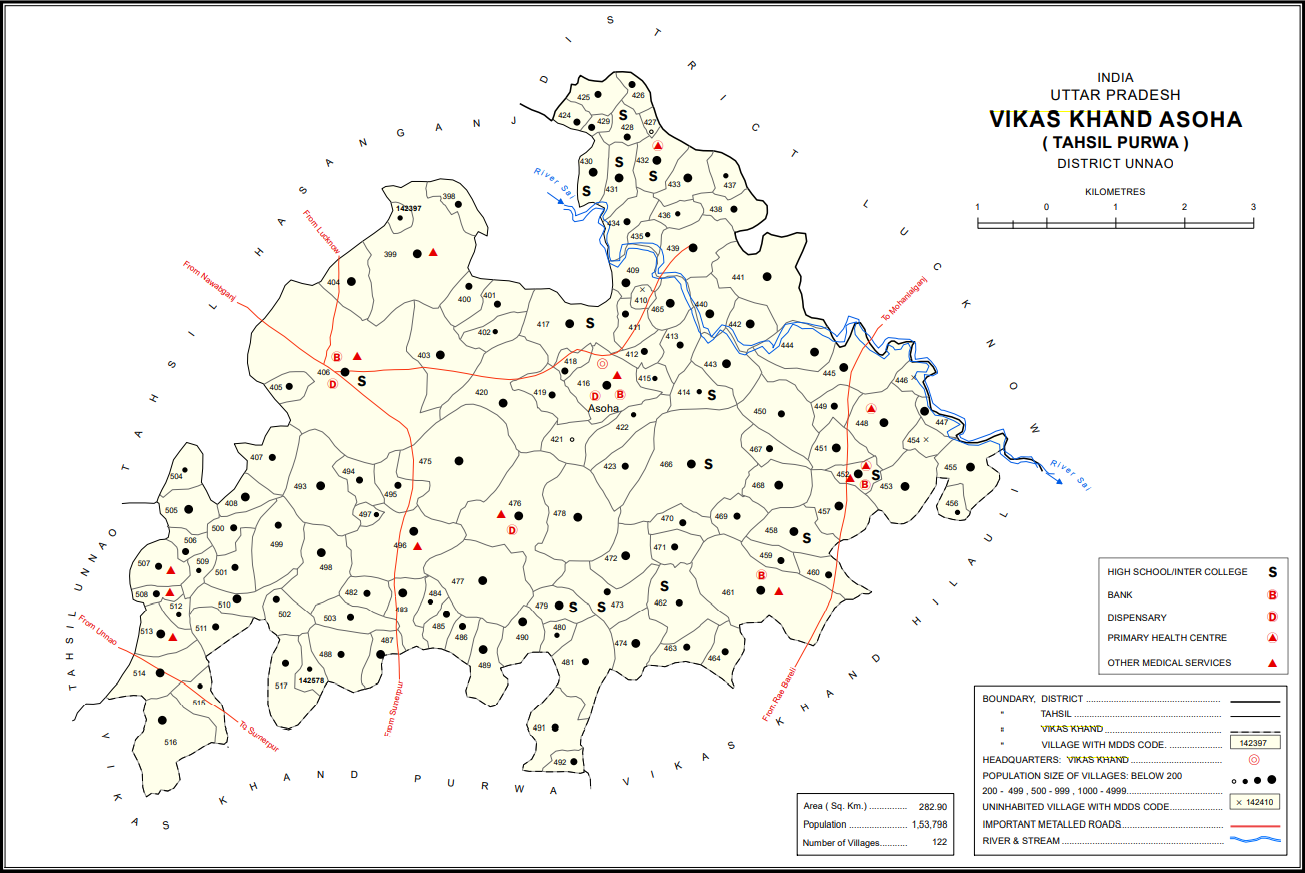
- Map showing Kalu Khera (#452) in Asoha CD block

- Location in Uttar Pradesh, India
- Coordinates: 26.554791°N 80.909915°E
- Country India: India
- State: Uttar Pradesh
- District: Unnao

Area
  - Total: 1.01 km^{2} (0.39 sq mi)

Population (2011)
  - Total: 1,888
  - Density: 1,870/km^{2} (4,840/sq mi)

Languages
  - Official: Hindi
- Time zone: UTC+5:30 (IST)
- Vehicle registration: UP-35

Kalu Khera is a village in Asoha block of Unnao district, Uttar Pradesh, India. It is located on a major district road and has one primary school and one medical clinic. In 2011, its population was 1,888, in 355 households.

The 1961 census recorded Kalu Khera (under the spelling "Kaloo Khera") as comprising one hamlet, with a total population of 515 (265 male and 250 female), in 93 households and 88 physical houses. It had a medical clinic at the time. The village then had two grain mills and two small manufacturers of ceramics. The P.L.K.P. Higher Secondary School in Kalu Khera, established in 1942, was in 1961 recorded as having a faculty of 12 teachers (all male) and a student body of 255 (also all male). The area of the village was given as 253 acres.
