= Pahasa =

Pahasa Pahāsa
- Village
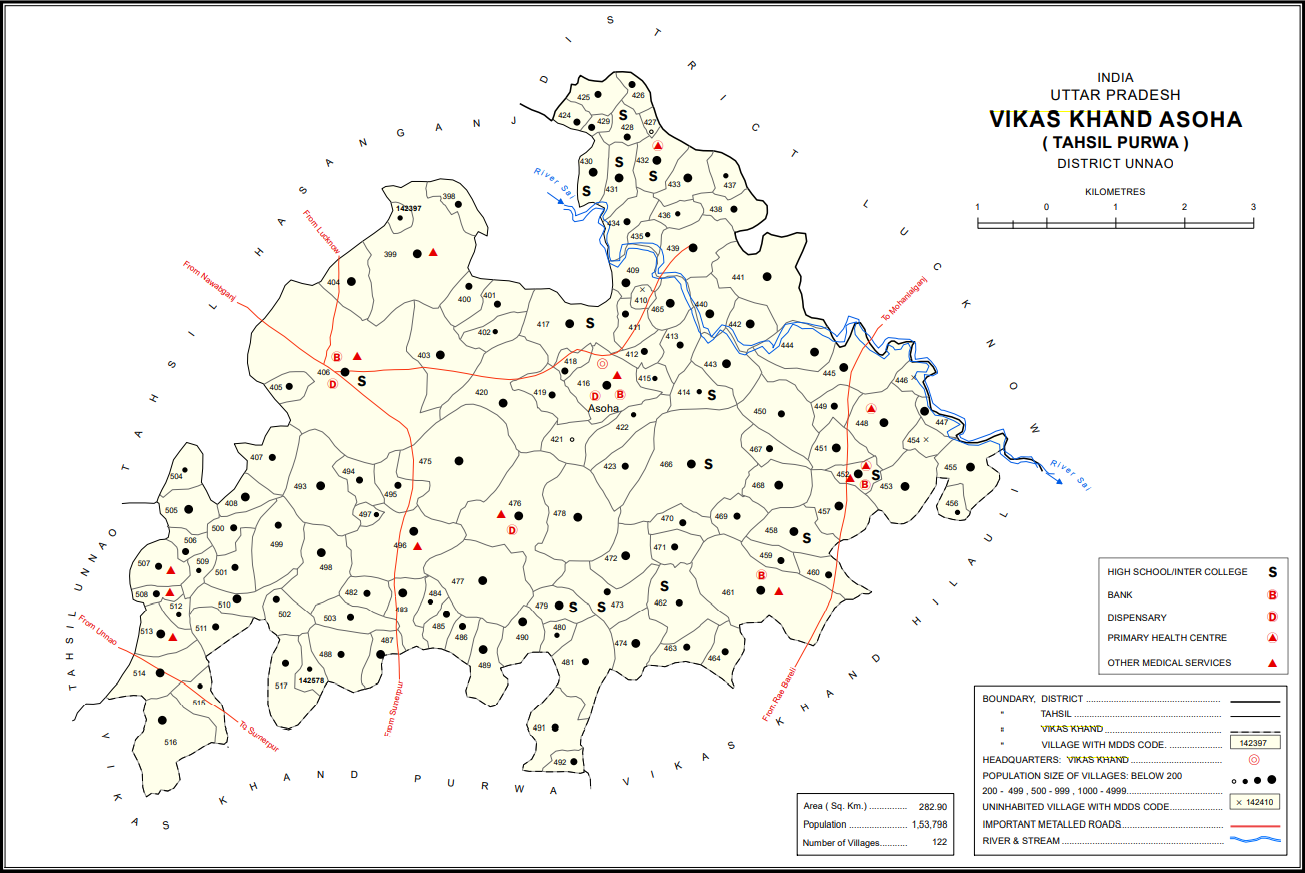
- Map showing Pahasa (#448) in Asoha CD block

- Location in Uttar Pradesh, India
- Coordinates: 26.568666°N 80.917446°E
- Country India: India
- State: Uttar Pradesh
- District: Unnao

Area
  - Total: 3.78 km^{2} (1.46 sq mi)

Population (2011)
  - Total: 1,355
  - Density: 358/km^{2} (928/sq mi)

Languages
  - Official: Hindi
- Time zone: UTC+5:30 (IST)
- Vehicle registration: UP-35

Pahasa is a village in Asoha block of Unnao district, Uttar Pradesh, India. It has one primary school and one medical clinic. As of 2011, its population is 1,355, in 271 households.

The 1961 census recorded Pahasa as comprising 2 hamlets, with a total population of 540 (280 male and 260 female), in 165 households and 120 physical houses. The area of the village was given as 923 acres.
