= Nimaicha =

- Village
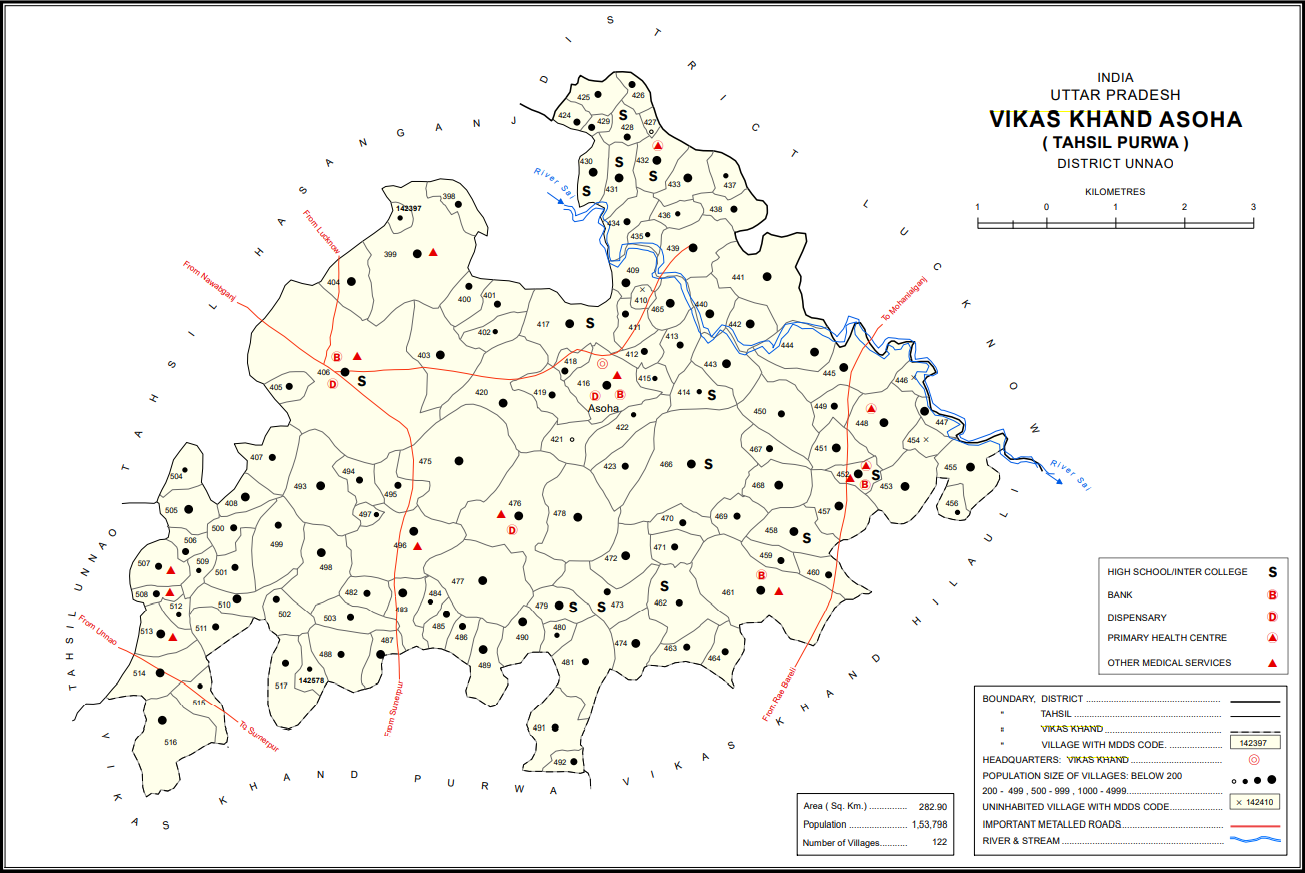
- Map showing Nimaicha (#413) in Asoha CD block

- Location in Uttar Pradesh, India
- Coordinates: 26.585286°N 80.852945°E
- Country India: India
- State: Uttar Pradesh
- District: Unnao

Area
  - Total: 1.159 km^{2} (0.447 sq mi)

Population (2011)
  - Total: 607
  - Density: 524/km^{2} (1,360/sq mi)

Languages
  - Official: Hindi
- Time zone: UTC+5:30 (IST)
- Vehicle registration: UP-35

Nimaicha is a village in Asoha block of Unnao district, Uttar Pradesh, India. It is not located on major district roads and has one primary school and no healthcare facilities. As of 2011, its population is 607, in 116 households.

The 1961 census recorded Nimaicha (here spelled "Nemaicha") as comprising 1 hamlet, with a total population of 263 (131 male and 132 female), in 52 households and 44 physical houses. The area of the village was given as 291 acres. It had a medical practitioner at the time.
