= Samadha =

Samadha Samādha
- Village
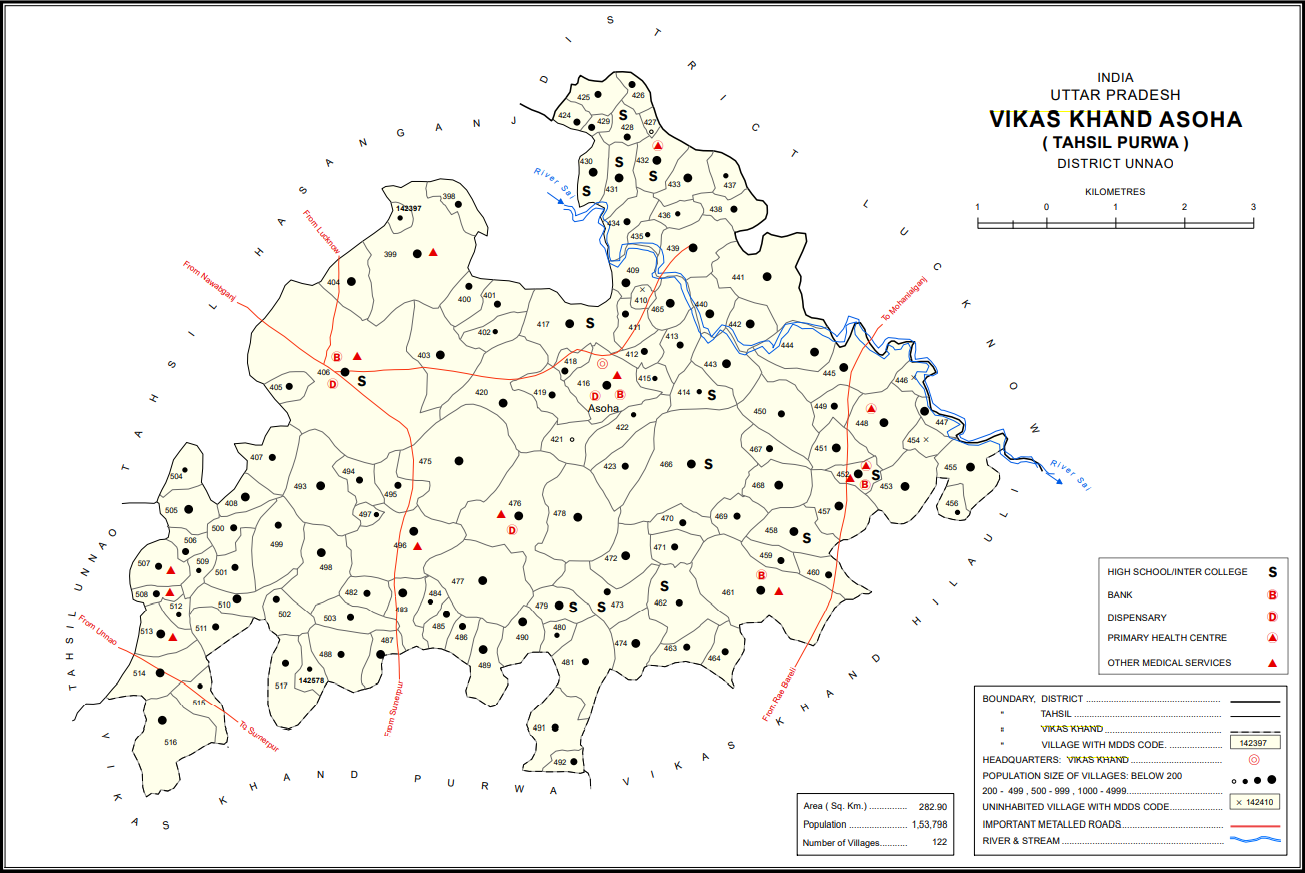
- Map showing Samadha (#466) in Asoha CD block

- Location in Uttar Pradesh, India
- Coordinates: 26.556421°N 80.859985°E
- Country India: India
- State: Uttar Pradesh
- District: Unnao

Area
  - Total: 8.569 km^{2} (3.309 sq mi)

Population (2011)
  - Total: 3,681
  - Density: 429.6/km^{2} (1,113/sq mi)

Languages
  - Official: Hindi
- Time zone: UTC+5:30 (IST)
- Vehicle registration: UP-35

Samadha is a village in Asoha block of Unnao district, Uttar Pradesh, India. It is not connected to major district roads and has two primary schools and no healthcare facilities. As of 2011, its population is 3,681, in 694 households.

The 1961 census recorded Samadha as comprising 6 hamlets, with a total population of 1,701 (907 male and 794 female), in 344 households and 288 physical houses. The area of the village was given as 2,212 acres. It had a medical practitioner at the time.
