= Chilauli, Asoha =

Chilauli
- Village
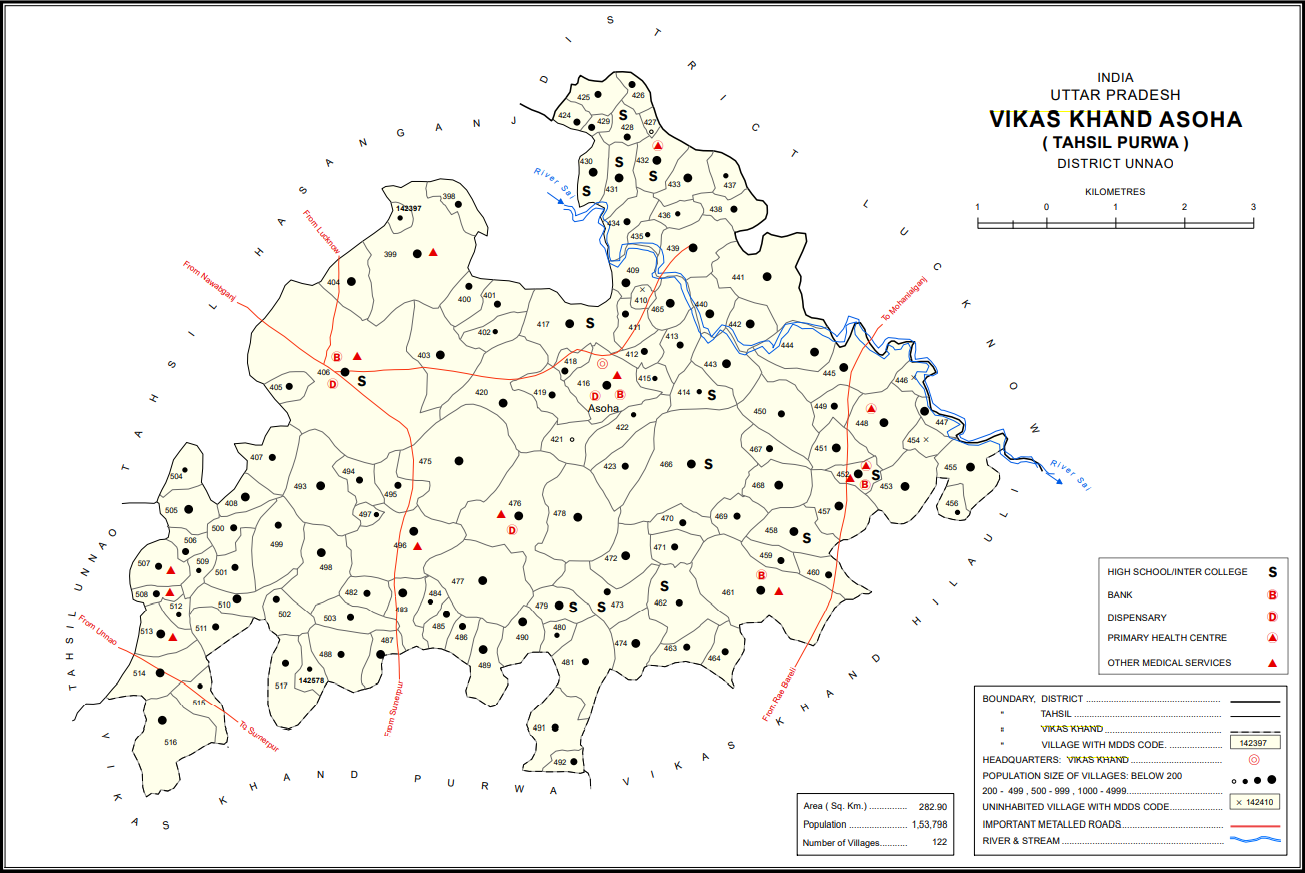
- Map showing Chilauli (#433) in Asoha CD block

- Location in Uttar Pradesh, India
- Coordinates: 26.635338°N 80.854271°E
- Country India: India
- State: Uttar Pradesh
- District: Unnao

Area
  - Total: 2.178 km^{2} (0.841 sq mi)

Population (2011)
  - Total: 1,165
  - Density: 534.9/km^{2} (1,385/sq mi)

Languages
  - Official: Hindi
- Time zone: UTC+5:30 (IST)
- Vehicle registration: UP-35

Chilauli is a village in Asoha block of Unnao district, Uttar Pradesh, India. As of 2011, its population is 1,165, in 230 households, and it has one primary school and no healthcare facilities.

The 1961 census recorded Chilauli as comprising 4 hamlets, with a total population of 530 (280 male and 250 female), in 99 households and 97 physical houses. The area of the village was given as 568 acres.

The 1981 census recorded Chilauli as having a population of 787 people, in 153 households, and having an area of 244.84 hectares.
