= Majharia, Unnao =

Majharia
- Village
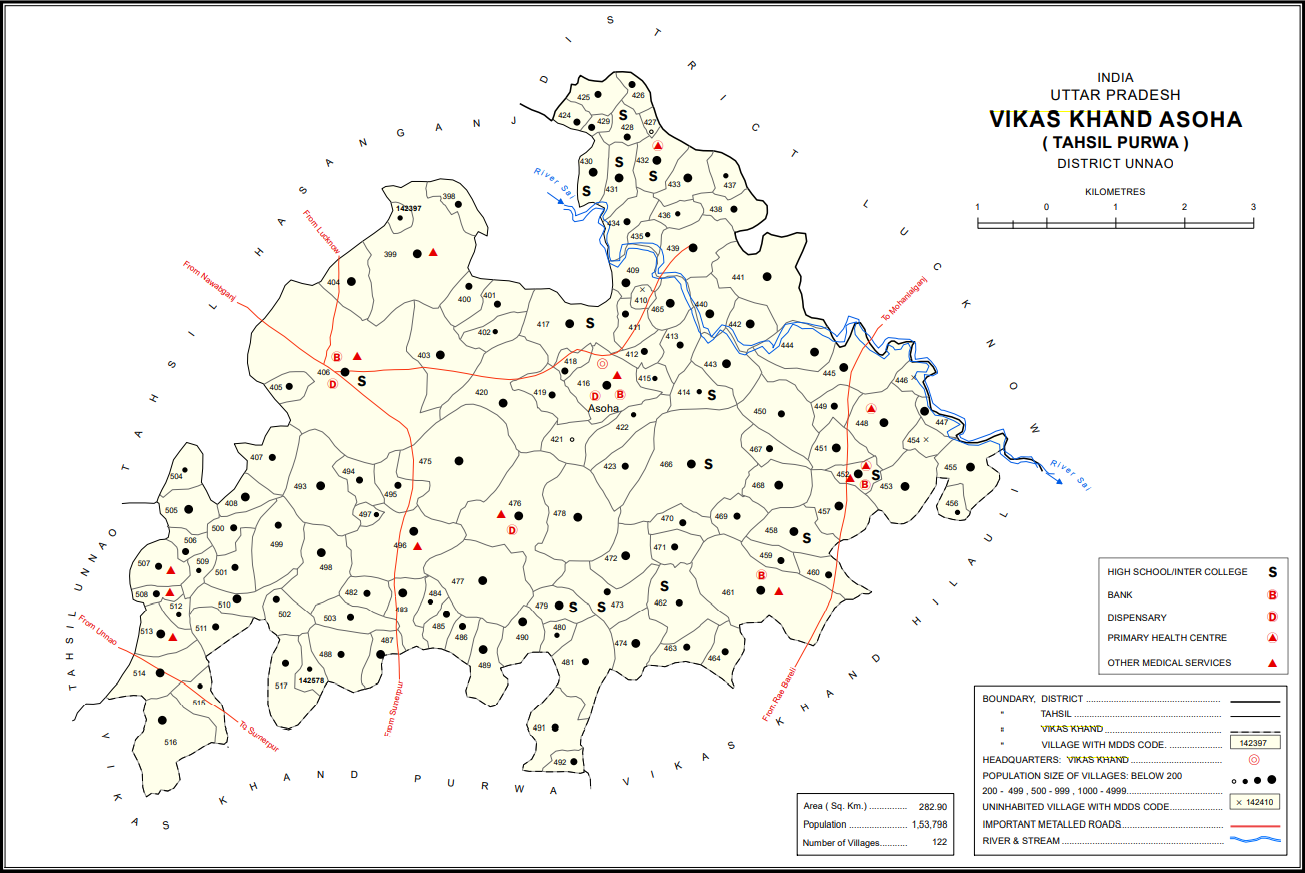
- Map showing Majharia (#440) in Asoha CD block

- Location in Uttar Pradesh, India
- Coordinates: 26.60336°N 80.863976°E
- Country India: India
- State: Uttar Pradesh
- District: Unnao

Area
  - Total: 1.425 km^{2} (0.550 sq mi)

Population (2011)
  - Total: 1,096
  - Density: 769.1/km^{2} (1,992/sq mi)

Languages
  - Official: Hindi
- Time zone: UTC+5:30 (IST)
- Vehicle registration: UP-35

Majharia is a village in Asoha block of Unnao district, Uttar Pradesh, India. It is not located on major district roads and has one primary school and no healthcare facilities. As of 2011, its population is 1,096, in 205 households.

The 1961 census recorded Majharia as comprising 1 hamlet, with a total population of 406 (206 male and 200 female), in 85 households and 80 physical houses. The area of the village was given as 359 acres.
