= Asawar, Unnao =

Asawar Asāwar
- Village
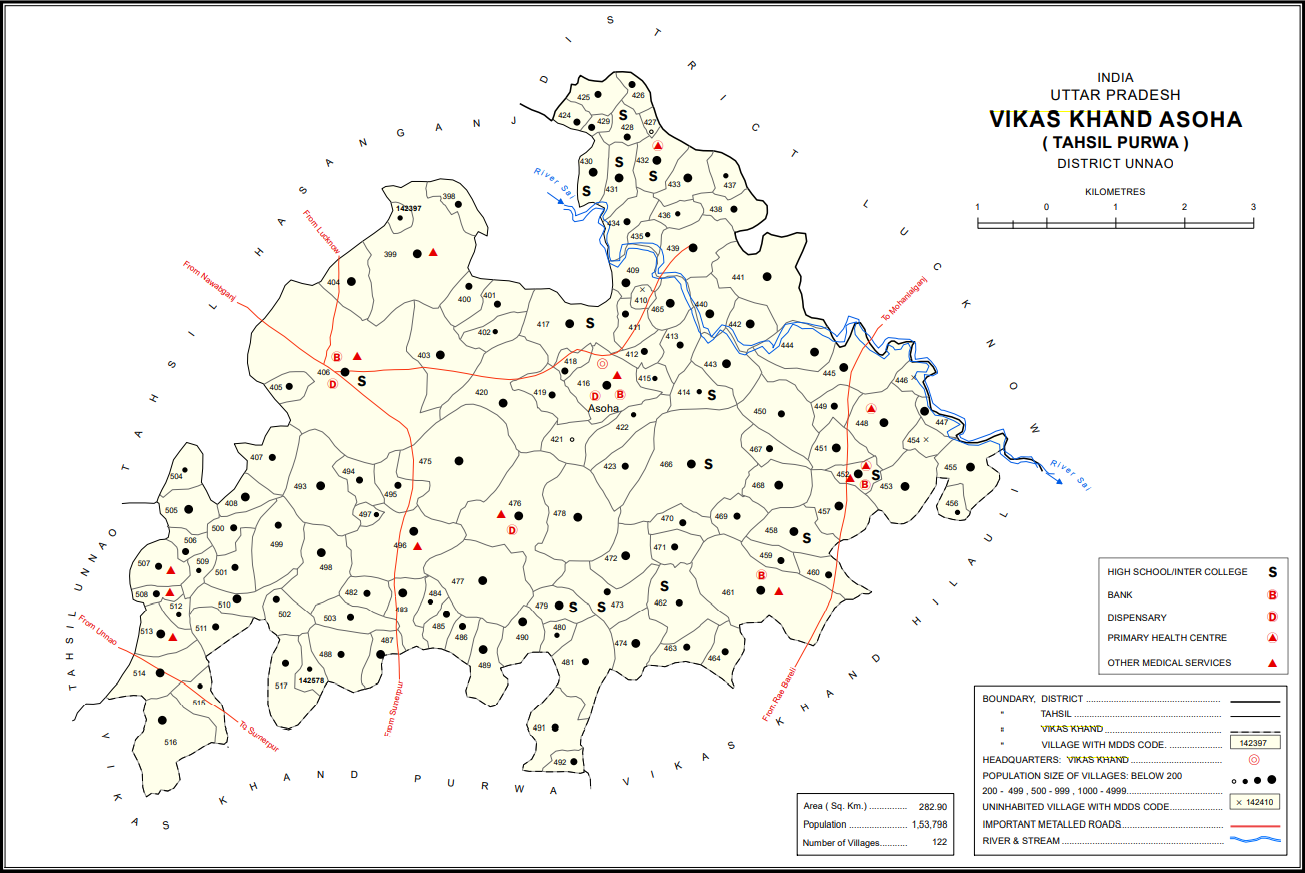
- Map showing Asawar (#477) in Asoha CD block

- Location in Uttar Pradesh, India
- Coordinates: 26.530238°N 80.798955°E
- Country India: India
- State: Uttar Pradesh
- District: Unnao

Area
  - Total: 5.101 km^{2} (1.970 sq mi)

Population (2011)
  - Total: 3,080
  - Density: 604/km^{2} (1,560/sq mi)

Languages
  - Official: Hindi
- Time zone: UTC+5:30 (IST)
- Vehicle registration: UP-35

Asawar is a village in Asoha block of Unnao district, Uttar Pradesh, India. It has two primary schools and no healthcare facilities. As of 2011, its population is 3,080, in 572 households.

The 1961 census recorded Asawar as comprising 8 hamlets, with a total population of 1,330 (669 male and 661 female), in 281 households and 236 physical houses. The area of the village was given as 1,535 acres. It had a medical practitioner at the time.
