= Kantha, Unnao =

Kantha Kāntha
- Village
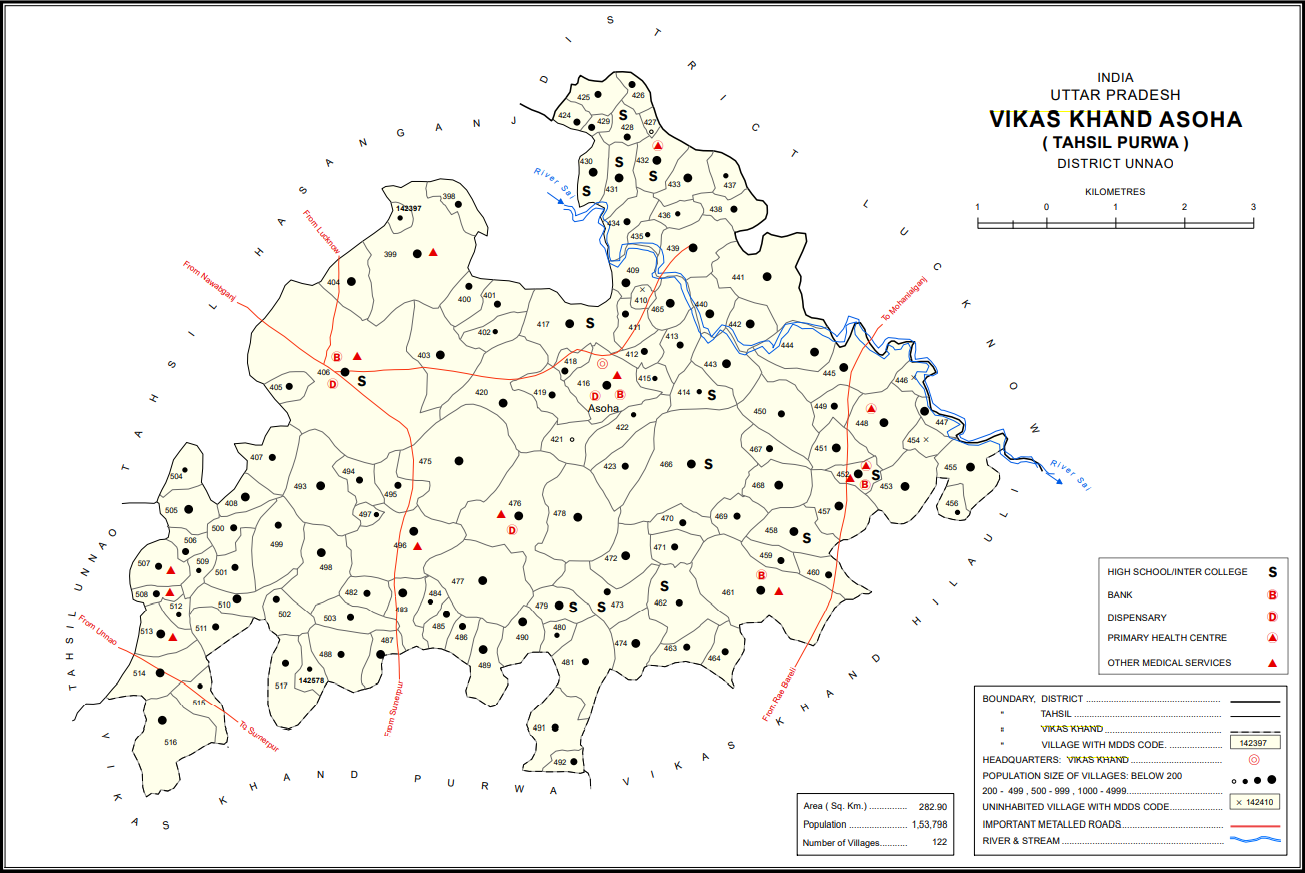
- Map showing Kantha (#406) in Asoha CD block

- Location in Uttar Pradesh, India
- Coordinates: 26.581933°N 80.754345°E
- Country India: India
- State: Uttar Pradesh
- District: Unnao

Area
  - Total: 21.551 km^{2} (8.321 sq mi)

Population (2011)
  - Total: 9,973
  - Density: 462.8/km^{2} (1,199/sq mi)

Languages
  - Official: Hindi
- Time zone: UTC+5:30 (IST)
- Vehicle registration: UP-35

Kantha is a village in Asoha block of Unnao district, Uttar Pradesh, India. It hosts two small melas, one of which is the Mahabirji-ka-Mela, held every Tuesday during the month of Jyaistha. People bring sweets, toys, and other items to sell at the fair. Kantha also hosts a market twice per week, on Mondays and Fridays, with vegetables being the main item of trade. As of 2011, the population of Kantha is 9,973, in 2,079 households.

== History ==
Kantha was historically the largest village in Asoha pargana. About 900 years ago a Lodha named Kantha is said to have cleared off the jungle which surrounded this place and people in. The name is derived from that of its founder.
