= Soho, Unnao =

Soho Village in Uttar Pradesh, India

Soho
- Village
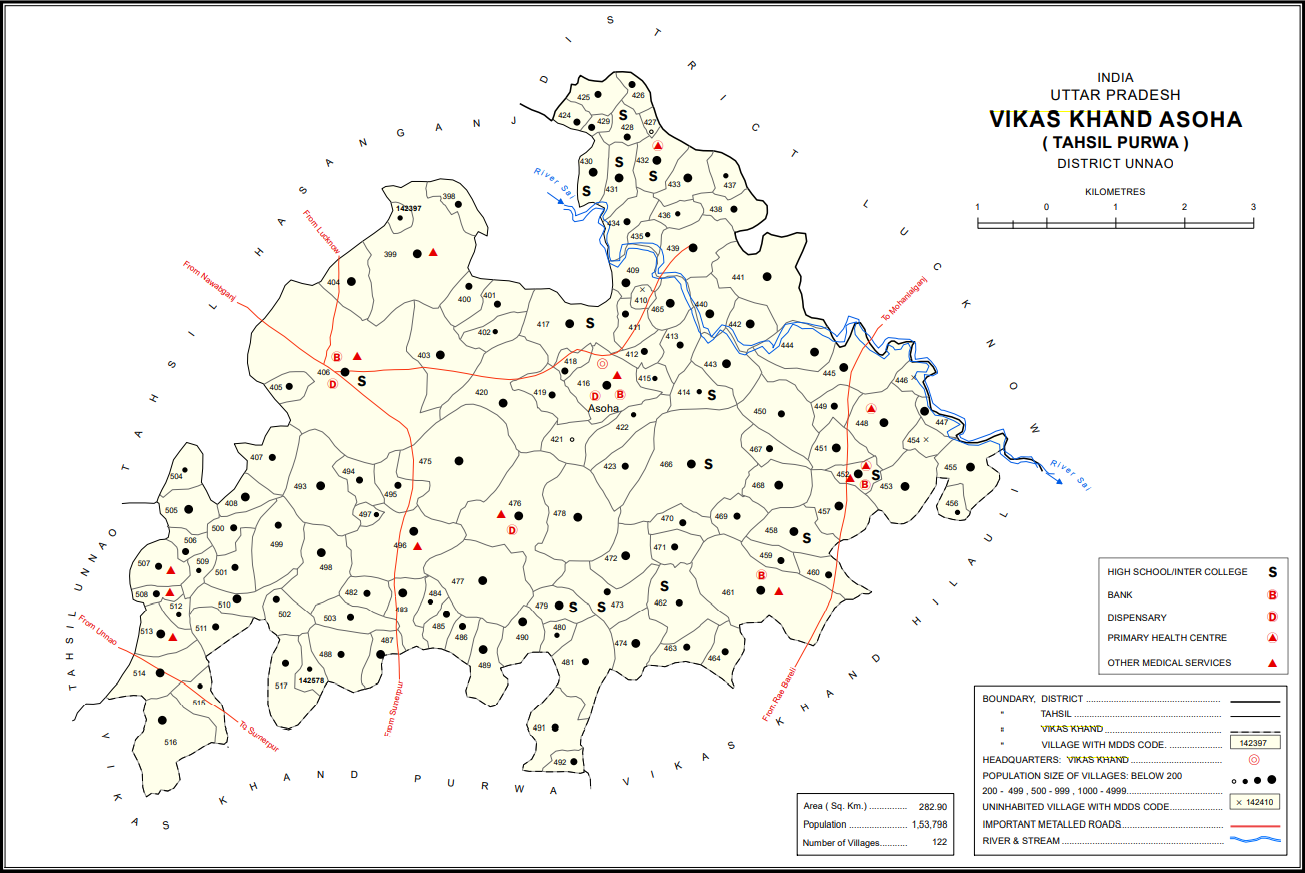
- Map showing Soho (#447) in Asoha CD block

- Location in Uttar Pradesh, India
- Coordinates: 26.572793°N 80.931111°E
- Country India: India
- State: Uttar Pradesh
- District: Unnao

Area
  - Total: 0.64 km^{2} (0.25 sq mi)

Population (2011)
  - Total: 1,675
  - Density: 2,600/km^{2} (6,800/sq mi)

Languages
  - Official: Hindi
- Time zone: UTC+5:30 (IST)
- Vehicle registration: UP-35

Soho is a village in Asoha block of Unnao district, Uttar Pradesh, India. It is not located on major roads and has one primary school and no healthcare facilities. As of 2011, its population is 1,675, in 303 households.

The 1961 census recorded Soho as comprising 1 hamlet, with a total population of 751 (401 male and 350 female), in 165 households and 120 physical houses. The area of the village was given as 163 acres.
