= Harnam Khera =

Harnam Khera Harnām Khera
- Village
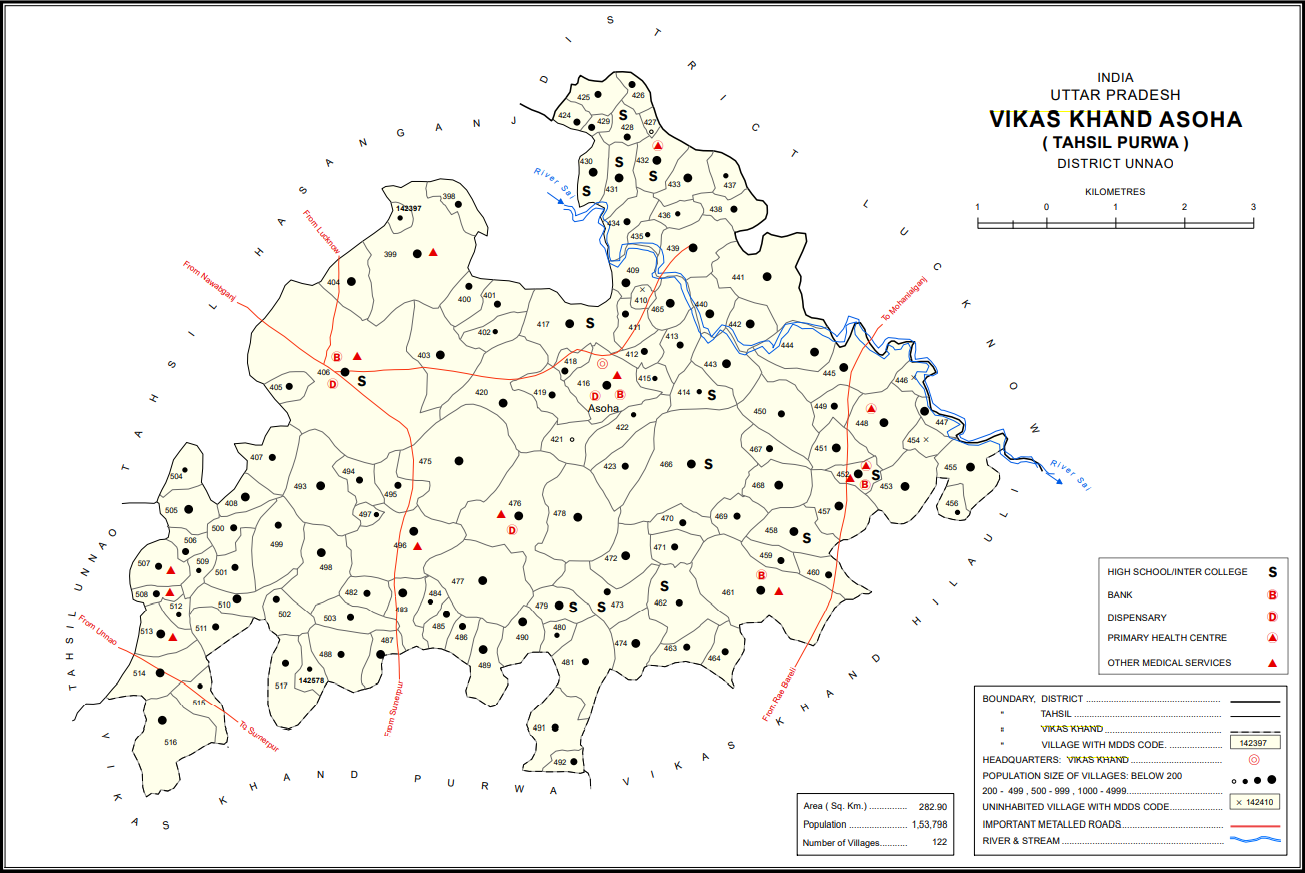
- Map showing Harnam Khera (#422) in Asoha CD block

- Location in Uttar Pradesh, India
- Coordinates: 26.56669°N 80.842387°E
- Country India: India
- State: Uttar Pradesh
- District: Unnao

Area
  - Total: 2.529 km^{2} (0.976 sq mi)

Population (2011)
  - Total: 347
  - Density: 137/km^{2} (355/sq mi)

Languages
  - Official: Hindi
- Time zone: UTC+5:30 (IST)
- Vehicle registration: UP-35

Harnam Khera is a village in Asoha block of Unnao district, Uttar Pradesh, India. It has no schools and no healthcare facilities. As of 2011, its population is 347, in 81 households.

The 1961 census recorded Harnam Khera as comprising 2 hamlets, with a total population of 203 (90 male and 113 female), in 41 households and 32 physical houses. The area of the village was given as 640 acres.
