= Darsawan =

Darsawan Darsawān
- Village
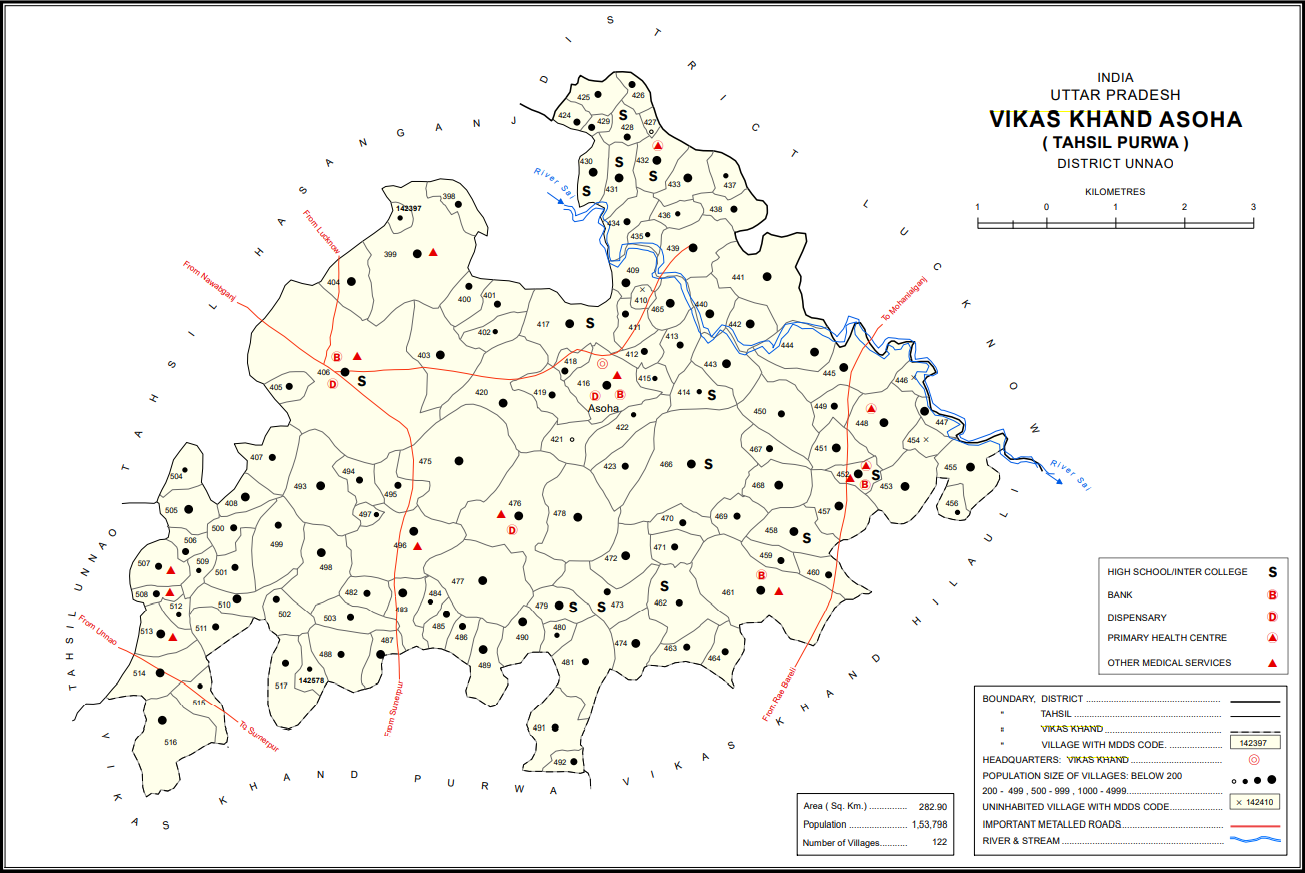
- Map showing Darsawan (#475) in Asoha CD block

- Location in Uttar Pradesh, India
- Coordinates: 26.553696°N 80.790155°E
- Country India: India
- State: Uttar Pradesh
- District: Unnao

Area
  - Total: 4.737 km^{2} (1.829 sq mi)

Population (2011)
  - Total: 3,074
  - Density: 648.9/km^{2} (1,681/sq mi)

Languages
  - Official: Hindi
- Time zone: UTC+5:30 (IST)
- Vehicle registration: UP-35

Darsawan is a village in Asoha block of Unnao district, Uttar Pradesh, India. It is not connected to major district roads and has two primary schools and two medical practitioners. As of 2011, its population is 3,074, in 600 households.

The 1961 census recorded Darsawan as comprising 7 hamlets, with a total population of 1,331 (697 male and 634 female), in 272 households and 228 physical houses. The area of the village was given as 1,981 acres. The village had one grain mill at the time.
