= Daun, Unnao =

Daun
- Village
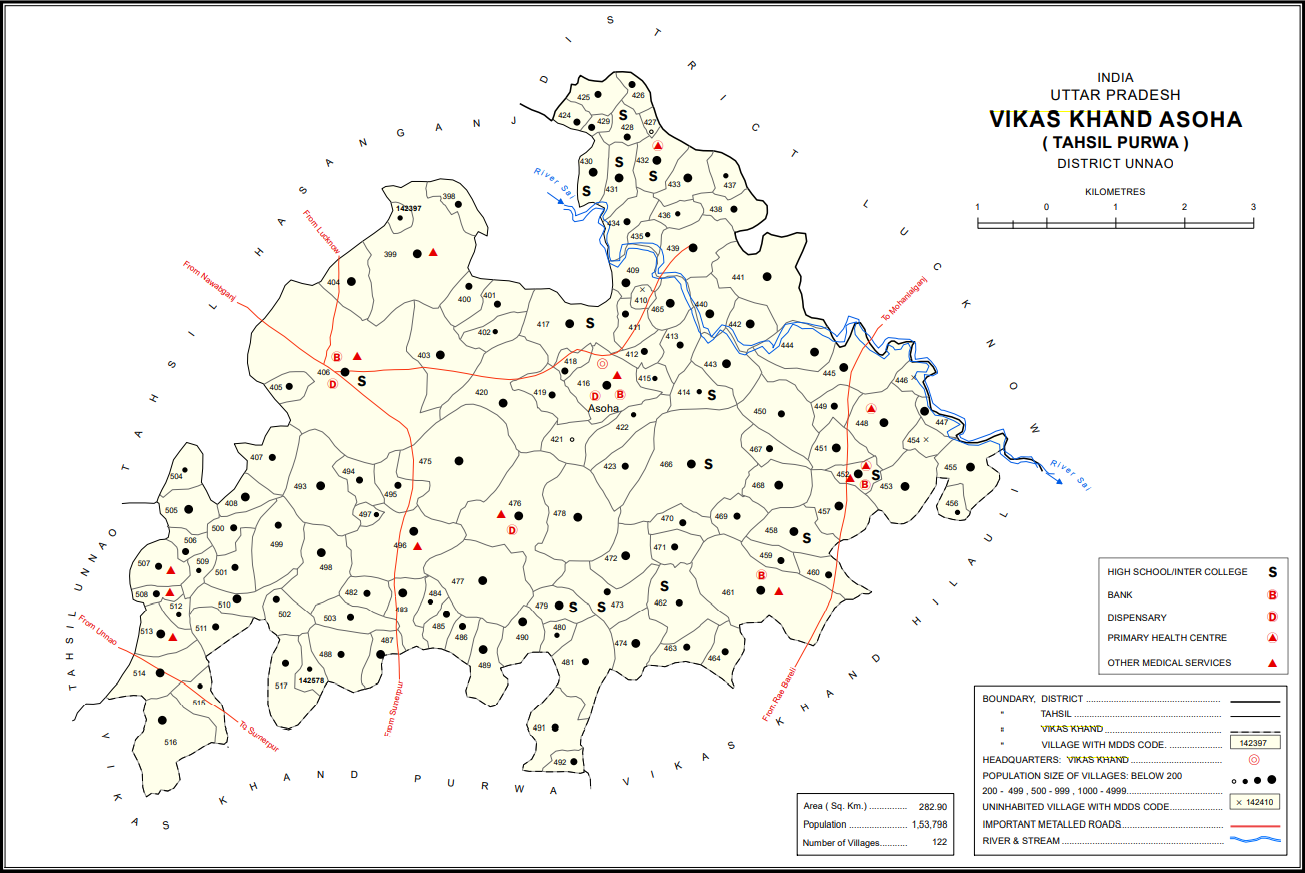
- Map showing Daun (#476) in Asoha CD block

- Location in Uttar Pradesh, India
- Coordinates: 26.538859°N 80.795543°E
- Country India: India
- State: Uttar Pradesh
- District: Unnao

Area
  - Total: 7.146 km^{2} (2.759 sq mi)

Population (2011)
  - Total: 2,743
  - Density: 383.9/km^{2} (994.2/sq mi)

Languages
  - Official: Hindi
- Time zone: UTC+5:30 (IST)
- Vehicle registration: UP-35

Daun is a village in Asoha block of Unnao district, Uttar Pradesh, India. It has one primary school and one medical dispensary. As of 2011, its population is 2,743, in 527 households.

The 1961 census recorded Daun as comprising 5 hamlets, with a total population of 1,237 (653 male and 584 female), in 248 households and 212 physical houses. The area of the village was given as 1,849 acres. It had a medical practitioner at the time. The village had 7 small food processing (miscellaneous) establishments and 1 small manufacturer of textiles at the time.
