= Sarwan, Unnao =

Sarwan
- Village
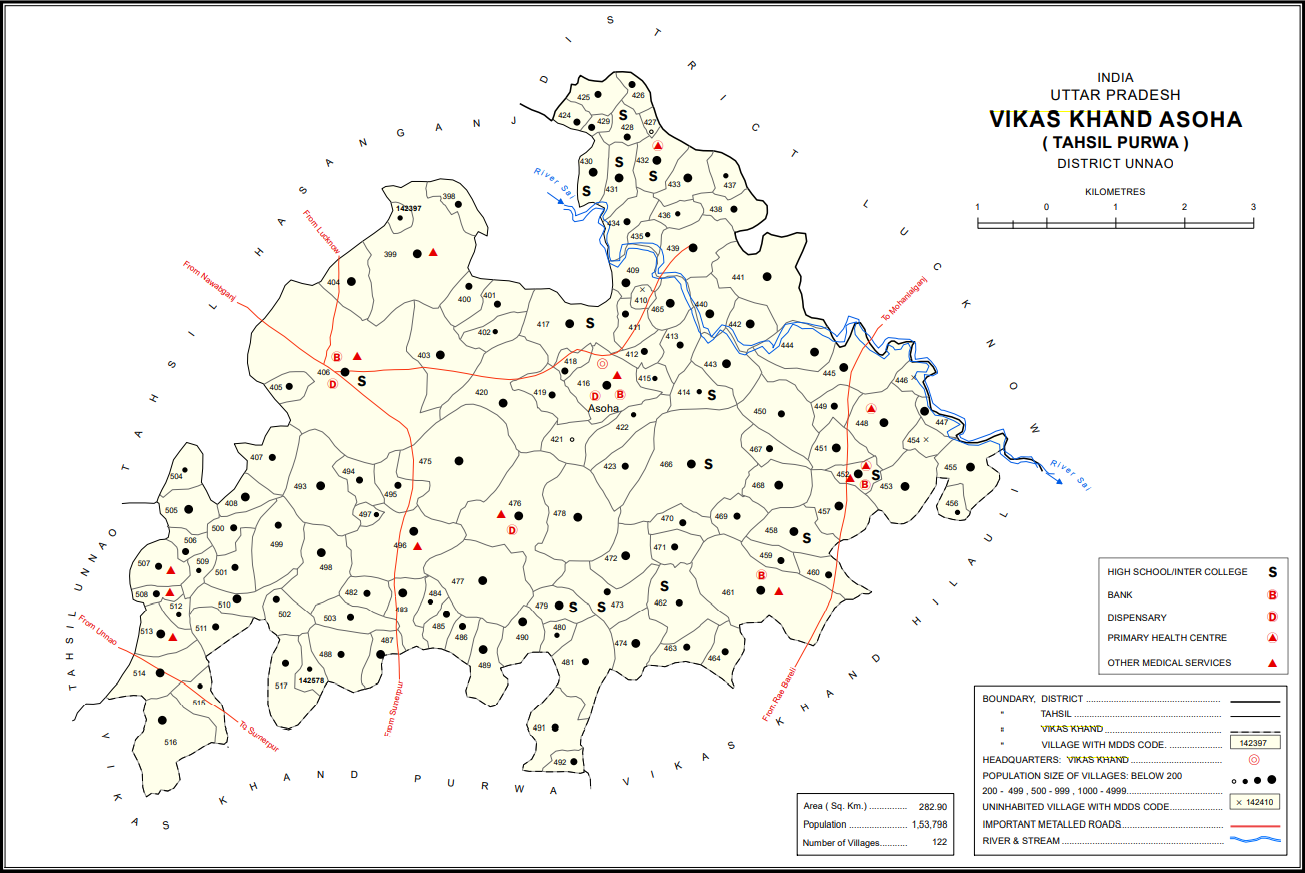
- Map showing Sarwan (#461) in Asoha CD block

- Location in Uttar Pradesh, India
- Coordinates: 26.519622°N 80.877724°E
- Country India: India
- State: Uttar Pradesh
- District: Unnao

Area
  - Total: 7.955 km^{2} (3.071 sq mi)

Population (2011)
  - Total: 3,824
  - Density: 480.7/km^{2} (1,245/sq mi)

Languages
  - Official: Hindi
- Time zone: UTC+5:30 (IST)
- Vehicle registration: UP-35

Sarwan is a village in Asoha block of Unnao district, Uttar Pradesh, India. It hosts a Deviji mela on Chaitra Badi 8-9 dedicated to the worship of the goddess Devi. Vendors bring agricultural implements, furniture, sweets, toys, and miscellaneous everyday items to sell at the fair. On Chait Krishna 7-8, Sarwan also hosts a market for the Durgaji Ka Mela, where mostly cloths and sweets are sold. Sarwan is located on a major district road and has one primary school and one medical practitioner. As of 2011, its population is 3,824, in 806 households.

The 1961 census recorded Sarwan as comprising 4 hamlets, with a total population of 1,868 (947 male and 921 female), in 339 households and 326 physical houses. The area of the village was given as 2,130 acres. Average attendance of the Deviji fair was recorded as being about 500 people; attendance at the Durgaji Ka Mela market averaged around 1,000. The village then had 4 small food processing (miscellaneous) establishments and 1 small manufacturer of textiles.
