= Kanchanpur, Unnao =

Kanchanpur
- Village
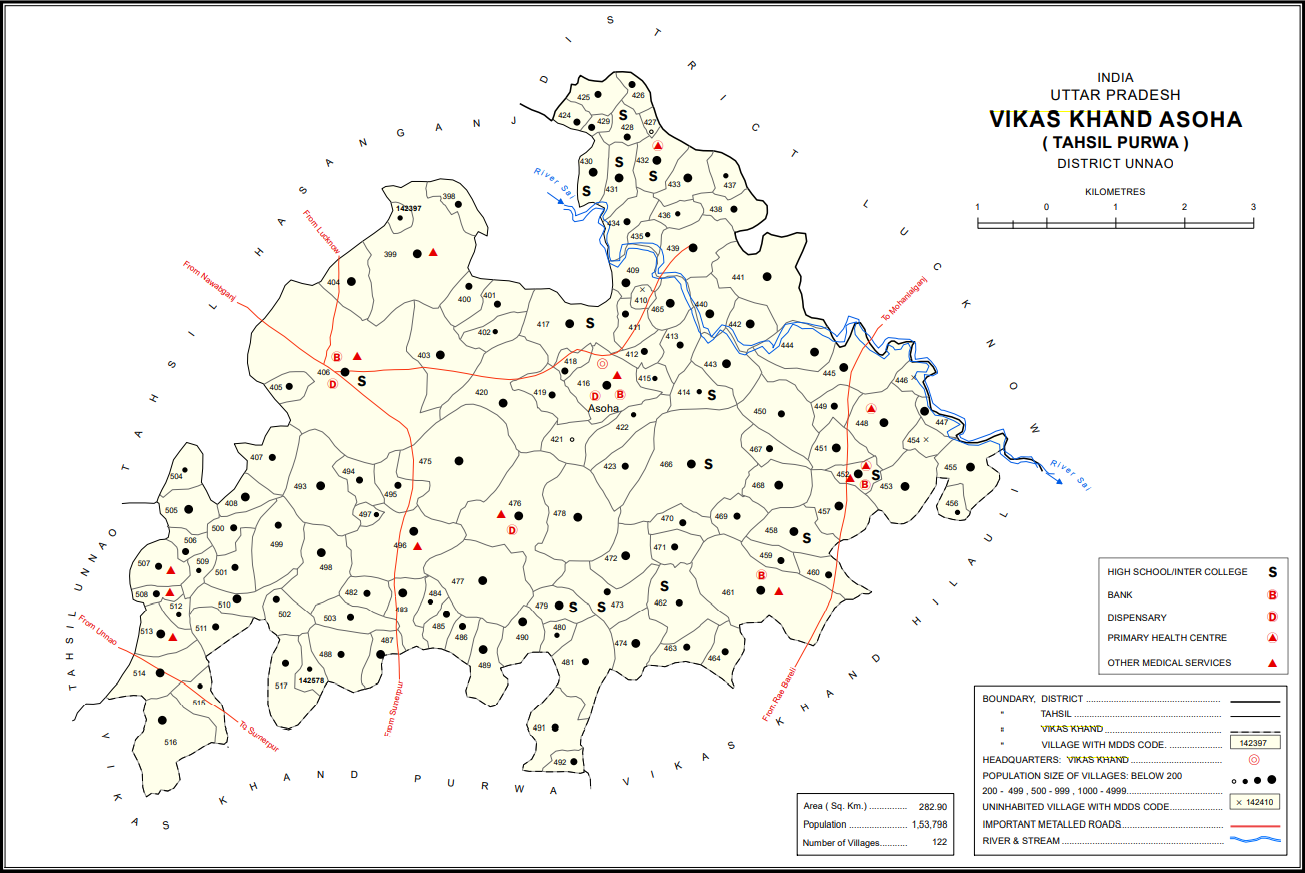
- Map showing Kanchanpur (#457) in Asoha CD block

- Location in Uttar Pradesh, India
- Coordinates: 26.541278°N 80.904981°E
- Country India: India
- State: Uttar Pradesh
- District: Unnao

Area
  - Total: 2.70 km^{2} (1.04 sq mi)

Population (2011)
  - Total: 1,793
  - Density: 664/km^{2} (1,720/sq mi)

Languages
  - Official: Hindi
- Time zone: UTC+5:30 (IST)
- Vehicle registration: UP-35

Kanchanpur is a village in Asoha block of Unnao district, Uttar Pradesh, India. It is located on a major district road and has one primary school and no healthcare facilities. As of 2011, its population is 1,793, in 314 households.

The 1961 census recorded Kanchanpur as comprising 2 hamlets, with a total population of 917 (470 male and 447 female), in 165 households and 148 physical houses. The area of the village was given as 699 acres.
