= Rampur, Asoha =

Rampur Rāmpur
- Village
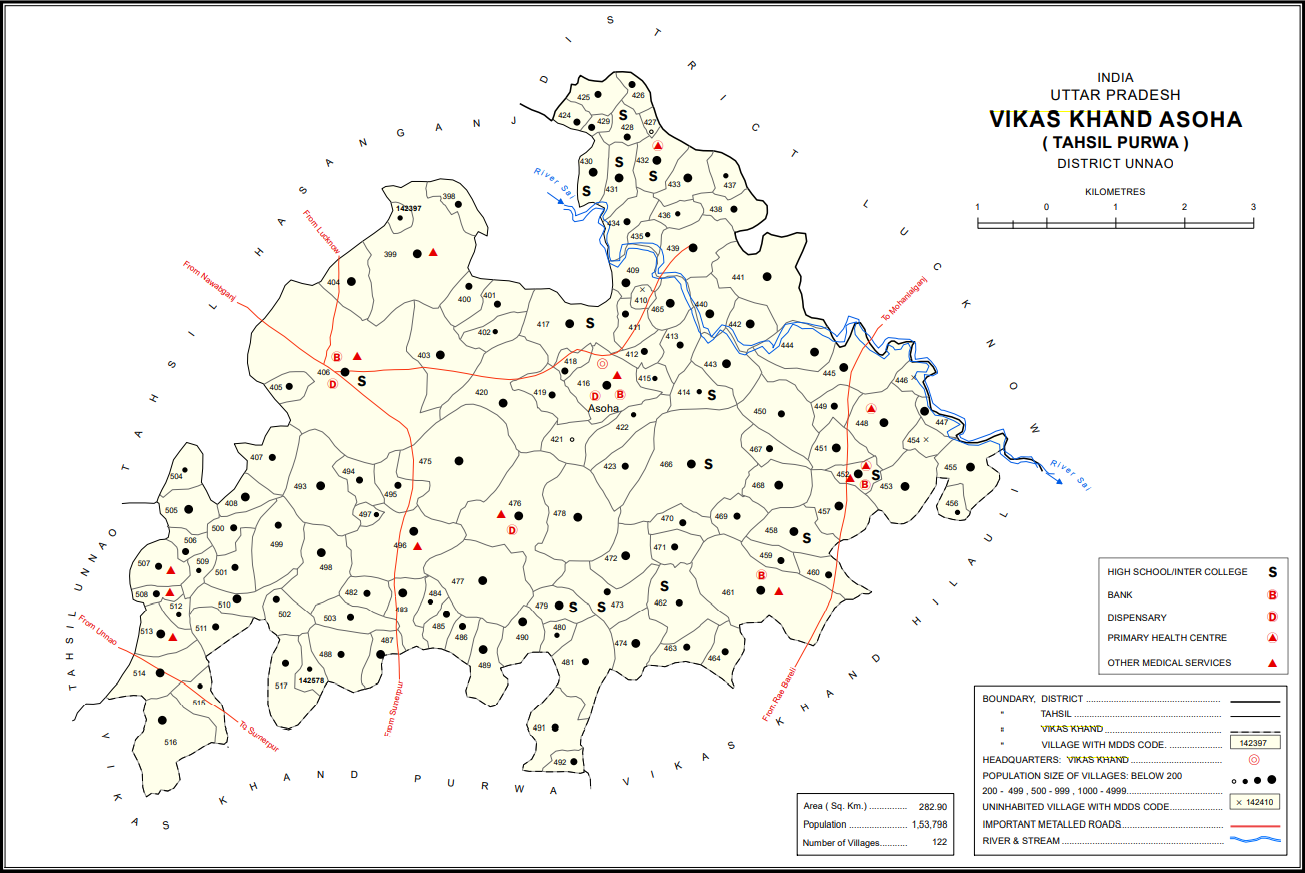
- Map showing Rampur (#455) in Asoha CD block

- Location in Uttar Pradesh, India
- Coordinates: 26.56433°N 80.941972°E
- Country India: India
- State: Uttar Pradesh
- District: Unnao

Area
  - Total: 3.306 km^{2} (1.276 sq mi)

Population (2011)
  - Total: 1,432
  - Density: 433.2/km^{2} (1,122/sq mi)

Languages
  - Official: Hindi
- Time zone: UTC+5:30 (IST)
- Vehicle registration: UP-35

Rampur is a village in Asoha block of Unnao district, Uttar Pradesh, India. It is located on major district roads and has one primary school and no healthcare facilities. As of 2011, its population is 1,432, in 421 households.

The 1961 census recorded Rampur as comprising 2 hamlets, with a total population of 612 (316 male and 296 female), in 141 households and 124 physical houses. The area of the village was given as 842 acres.
