= Mirri Khurd =

Mirri Khurd Kusal Khera
- Village
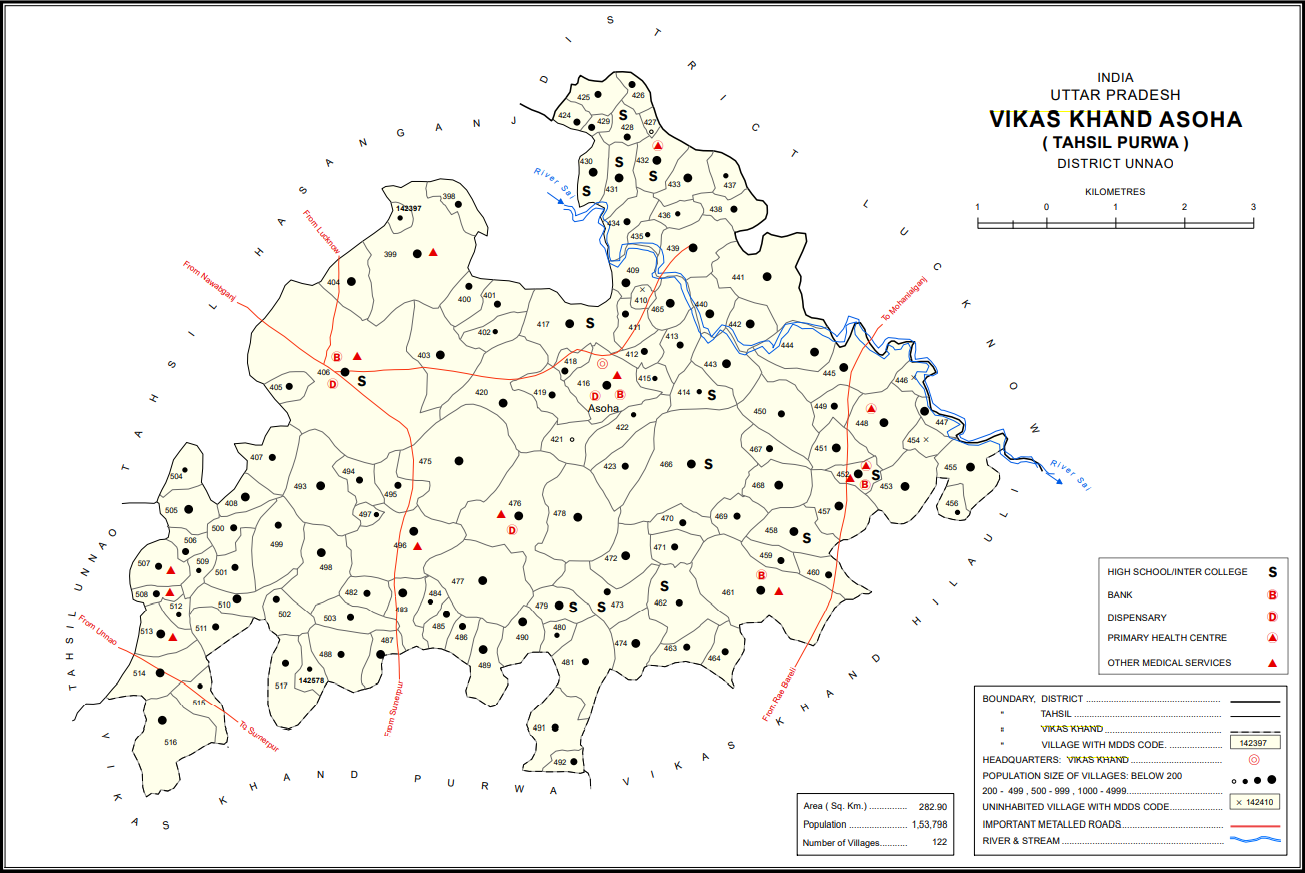
- Map showing Mirri Khurd (#495) in Asoha CD block

- Location in Uttar Pradesh, India
- Coordinates: 26.550989°N 80.771621°E
- Country India: India
- State: Uttar Pradesh
- District: Unnao

Area
  - Total: 1.662 km^{2} (0.642 sq mi)

Population (2011)
  - Total: 589
  - Density: 354/km^{2} (918/sq mi)

Languages
  - Official: Hindi
- Time zone: UTC+5:30 (IST)
- Vehicle registration: UP-35

Mirri Khurd, also called Kusal Khera, is a village in Asoha block of Unnao district, Uttar Pradesh, India. It has no schools or healthcare facilities. As of 2011, its population is 589, in 109 households.

The 1961 census recorded Mirri Khurd (under the spelling "Miri Khurd") as comprising 1 hamlets, with a total population of 234 (122 male and 112 female), in 40 households and 40 physical houses. The area of the village was given as 420 acres.
