= Gaddipur =

- Village
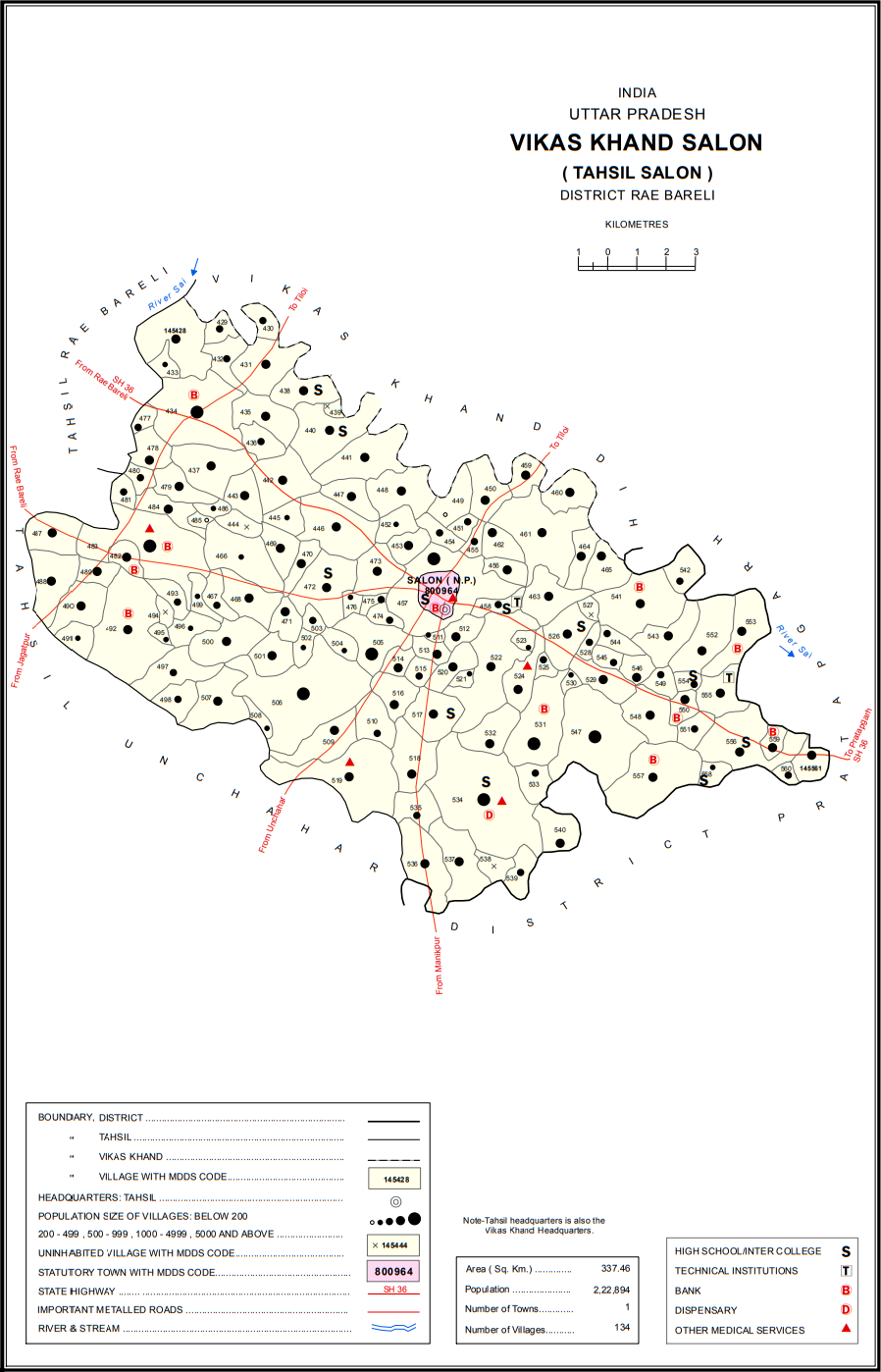
- Map showing Gaddipur (#455) in Salon CD block

- Location in Uttar Pradesh, India
- Coordinates: 26.046588°N 81.46848°E
- Country: India
- State: Uttar Pradesh
- District: Raebareli

Area
  - Total: 0.57 km^{2} (0.22 sq mi)

Population (2011)
  - Total: 548
  - Density: 960/km^{2} (2,500/sq mi)

Languages
  - Official: Hindi
- Time zone: UTC+5:30 (IST)
- Vehicle registration: UP-35

Gaddipur is a village in Salon block of Rae Bareli district, Uttar Pradesh, India. It is located 2 km from Salon, the block and tehsil headquarters. As of 2011, Gaddipur has a population of 548 people, in 104 households. It has no schools and no healthcare facilities, and it does not host a permanent market or a periodic haat.

The 1961 census recorded Gaddipur as comprising 2 hamlets, with a total population of 182 people (86 male and 96 female), in 35 households and 35 physical houses. The area of the village was given as 157 acres.

The 1981 census recorded Gaddipur as having a population of 176 people, in 19 households, and having an area of 64.35 hectares. The main staple foods were given as wheat and rice.
