= Chaupai, Unnao =

Chaupai Chaupāi
- Village
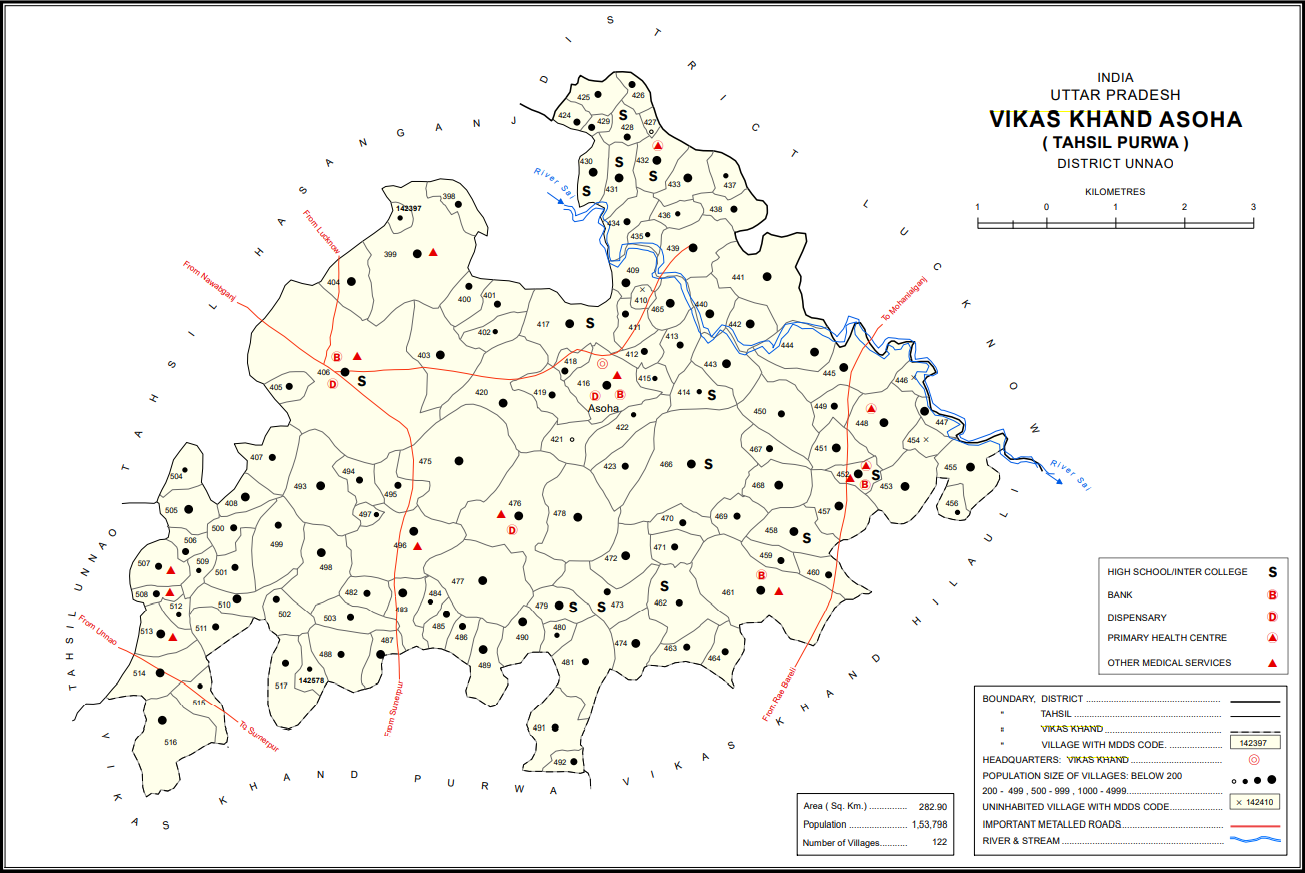
- Map showing Chaupai (#441) in Asoha CD block

- Location in Uttar Pradesh, India
- Coordinates: 26.610536°N 80.877621°E
- Country India: India
- State: Uttar Pradesh
- District: Unnao

Area
  - Total: 5.336 km^{2} (2.060 sq mi)

Population (2011)
  - Total: 2,548
  - Density: 477.5/km^{2} (1,237/sq mi)

Languages
  - Official: Hindi
- Time zone: UTC+5:30 (IST)
- Vehicle registration: UP-35

Chaupai is a village in Asoha block of Unnao district, Uttar Pradesh, India. It has one primary school and no healthcare facilities. As of 2011, its population is 2,548, in 554 households.

The 1961 census recorded Chaupai as comprising 3 hamlets, with a total population of 1,201 (627 male and 574 female), in 249 households and 237 physical houses. The area of the village was given as 1,342 acres. It had a medical practitioner and a post office at the time.
