= Datauli =

Datauli may refer to:

- Datauli, Raebareli
- Datauli, Firozabad
