= Pipri, Asoha =

Pipri
- Village
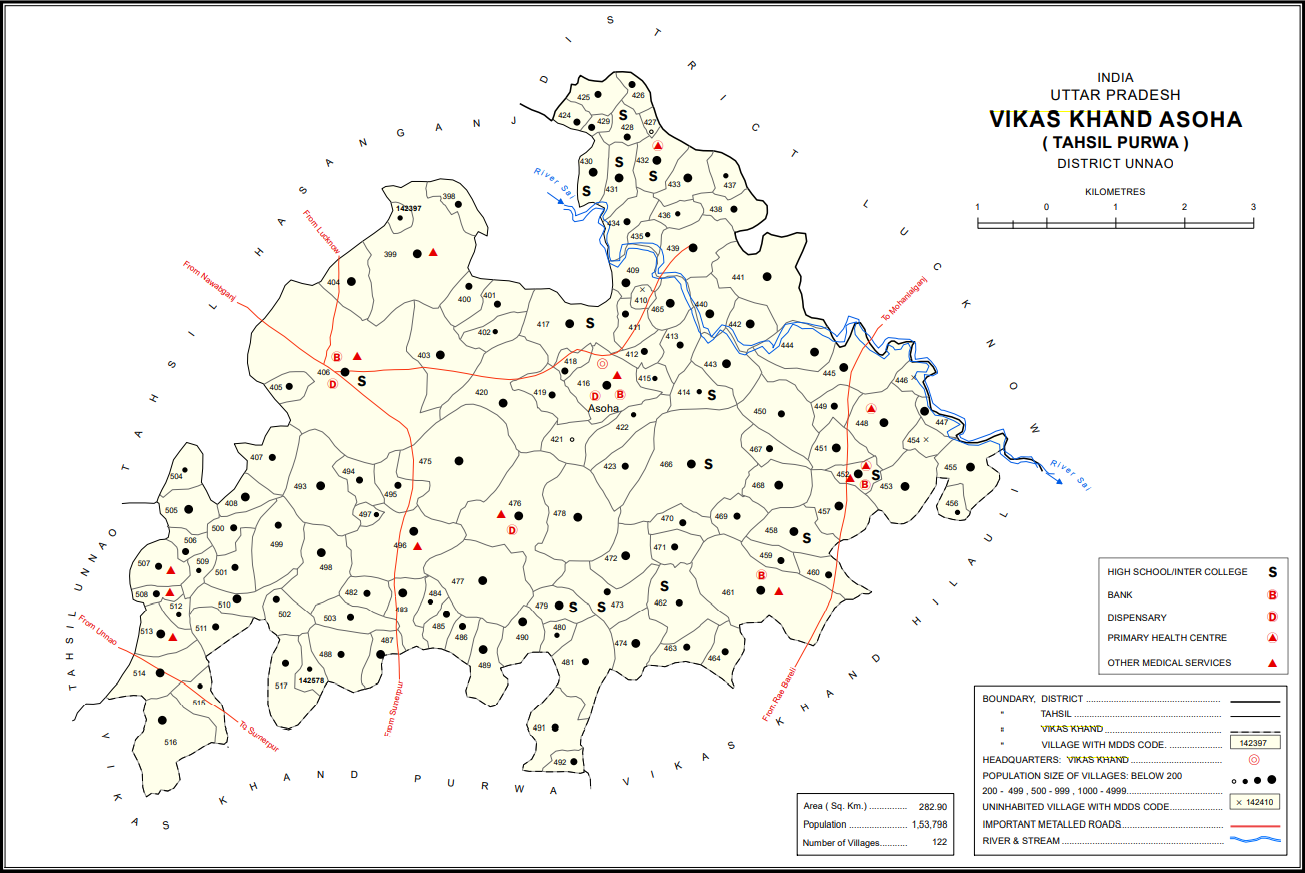
- Map showing Pipri (#474) in Asoha CD block

- Location in Uttar Pradesh, India
- Coordinates: 26.511404°N 80.845089°E
- Country India: India
- State: Uttar Pradesh
- District: Unnao

Area
  - Total: 2.248 km^{2} (0.868 sq mi)

Population (2011)
  - Total: 1,777
  - Density: 790.5/km^{2} (2,047/sq mi)

Languages
  - Official: Hindi
- Time zone: UTC+5:30 (IST)
- Vehicle registration: UP-35

Pipri is a village in Asoha block of Unnao district, Uttar Pradesh, India. It is connected to minor district roads and has two primary schools and no healthcare facilities. As of 2011, its population is 1,777, in 347 households.

The 1961 census recorded Pipri as comprising 4 hamlets, with a total population of 669 (345 male and 324 female), in 136 households and 112 physical houses. The area of the village was given as 565 acres.
