= Mirri Kalan =

Mirri Kalan Mirri Kalān
- Village
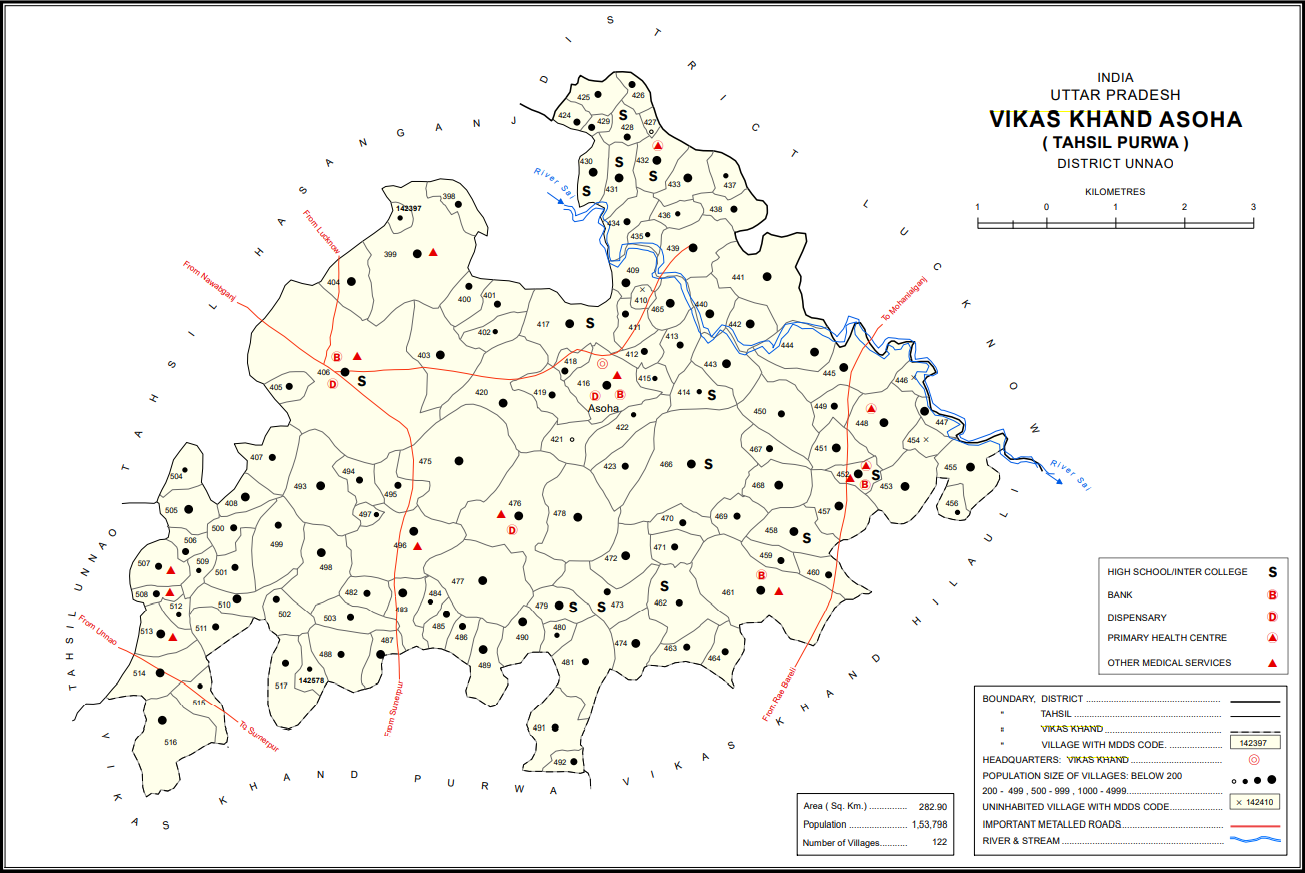
- Map showing Mirri Kalan (#496) in Asoha CD block

- Location in Uttar Pradesh, India
- Coordinates: 26.531332°N 80.772307°E
- Country India: India
- State: Uttar Pradesh
- District: Unnao

Area
  - Total: 6.271 km^{2} (2.421 sq mi)

Population (2011)
  - Total: 5,622
  - Density: 896.5/km^{2} (2,322/sq mi)

Languages
  - Official: Hindi
- Time zone: UTC+5:30 (IST)
- Vehicle registration: UP-35

Mirri Kalan is a village in Asoha block of Unnao district, Uttar Pradesh, India. It has nine primary schools and four medical practitioners as well as one veterinary hospital. As of 2011, its population is 5,622, in 1,066 households.

The 1961 census recorded Mirri Kalan (under the spelling "Miri Kalan") as comprising 10 hamlets, with a total population of 2,375 (1,237 male and 1,138 female), in 406 households and 316 physical houses. The area of the village was given as 1,585 acres. It had a medical practitioner and a post office at the time. There were two grain mills, 6 small miscellaneous food processing establishments, 2 small manufacturers of textiles, and 1 small manufacturer of hardware in the village at the time.
