= Mawai =

Mawai may refer to:

== Places ==
- Mawai, Ayodhya, Uttar Pradesh, India
- Mawai, Hilauli, Uttar Pradesh, India
- Mawai, Jalandhar, Punjab State, India
- Mawai, Raebareli, Uttar Pradesh, India
- Mawaiya metro station, Lucknow, Uttar Pradesh, India

== People ==
- Mavia (queen), or Mawai, Arab warrior queen 375–425 CE
- Mary Mawai, South Sudanese politician

== Other uses ==
- Mawae, or Mawai, a dialect of the Zia language of Morobe Province, Papua New Guinea
- SS Mawai, originally Empire Mayrose, a Hong Kong coaster

== See also ==
- Mavia (disambiguation)
