= Jera =

Jera may refer to:

- The j-rune, or Jeran
- Jera (butterfly), a genus of skipper butterflies
- Jera, Allahabad, a village in Uttar Pradesh, India
- Jera, Unnao, a village in Uttar Pradesh, India
- Jera, Iran, a village in Hamadan Province, Iran
- JERA, Japanese electrical power generation company
