= Lawa Singhan Khera =

- Village
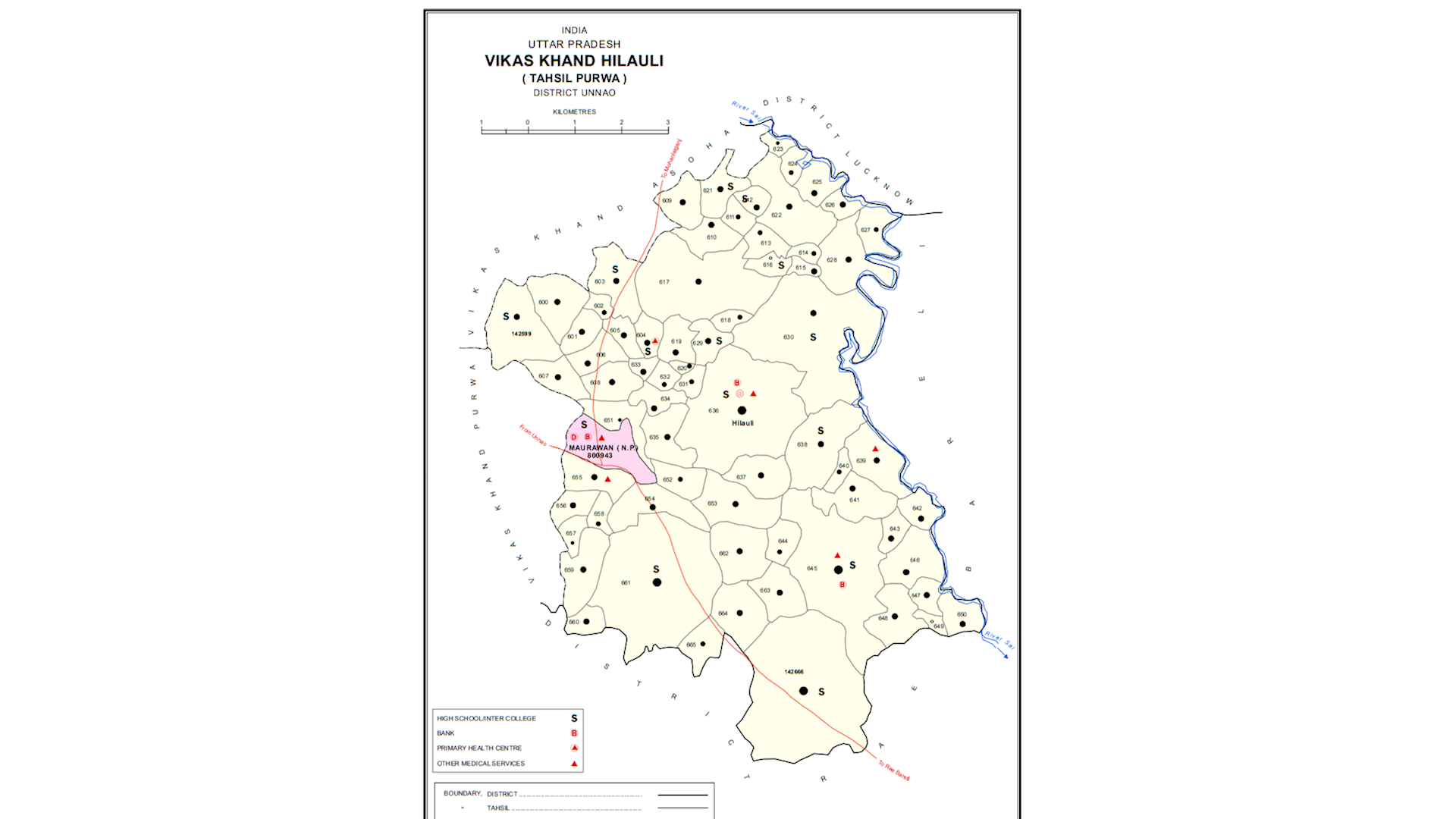
- Map showing Lawa Singhan Khera (#630) in Hilauli CD block

- Location in Uttar Pradesh, India
- Coordinates: 26.488243°N 80.982341°E
- Country India: India
- State: Uttar Pradesh
- District: Unnao

Area
  - Total: 20.23 km^{2} (7.81 sq mi)

Population (2011)
  - Total: 9,984
  - Density: 493.5/km^{2} (1,278/sq mi)

Languages
  - Official: Hindi
- Time zone: UTC+5:30 (IST)
- Vehicle registration: UP-35

Lawa Singhan Khera is a village in Hilauli block of Unnao district, Uttar Pradesh, India. Located on the Sai river, it is a dispersed settlement consisting of several separate hamlets. As of 2011, its population is 9,984, in 1,797 households, and it has 8 primary schools and no medical clinics. It hosts a weekly haat and has a sub post office.

== History ==
At the turn of the 20th century, Lawa Singhan Khera was described as a large village, "consisting of several scattered hamlets". It had a small marked called Udhuganj, and it formed part of the Maurawan estate, having been granted to that family by the British in return for their services during the Indian Rebellion of 1857. Its population was 3,120 people and mostly consisted of Ahirs.

The 1961 census recorded Lawa Singan Khera (spelled as "Lapa Singhan Khera") as comprising 21 hamlets, with a total population of 4,065 (2,033 male and 2,032 female), in 715 households and 664 physical houses. The area of the village was given as 5,180 acres. It had a post office then.
