= Basdeo =

Basdeo is a name. It can be both a masculine given name and a surname. Notable people with this name include:

== As a given name ==
- Basdeo Bissoondoyal (1906–1991), a Mauritian social worker
- Basdeo Panday (1933–2024), a Trinidadian and Tobagonian lawyer, politician, and actor

== As a surname ==
- Amarnath Basdeo (born 1977), a Trinidadian cricket player
- Sunny Basdeo (born 1931), a Guyanese cricket player

== See also ==
- Basdeo Khera, a village in Uttar Pradesh, India
