= Gulariha =

- Village
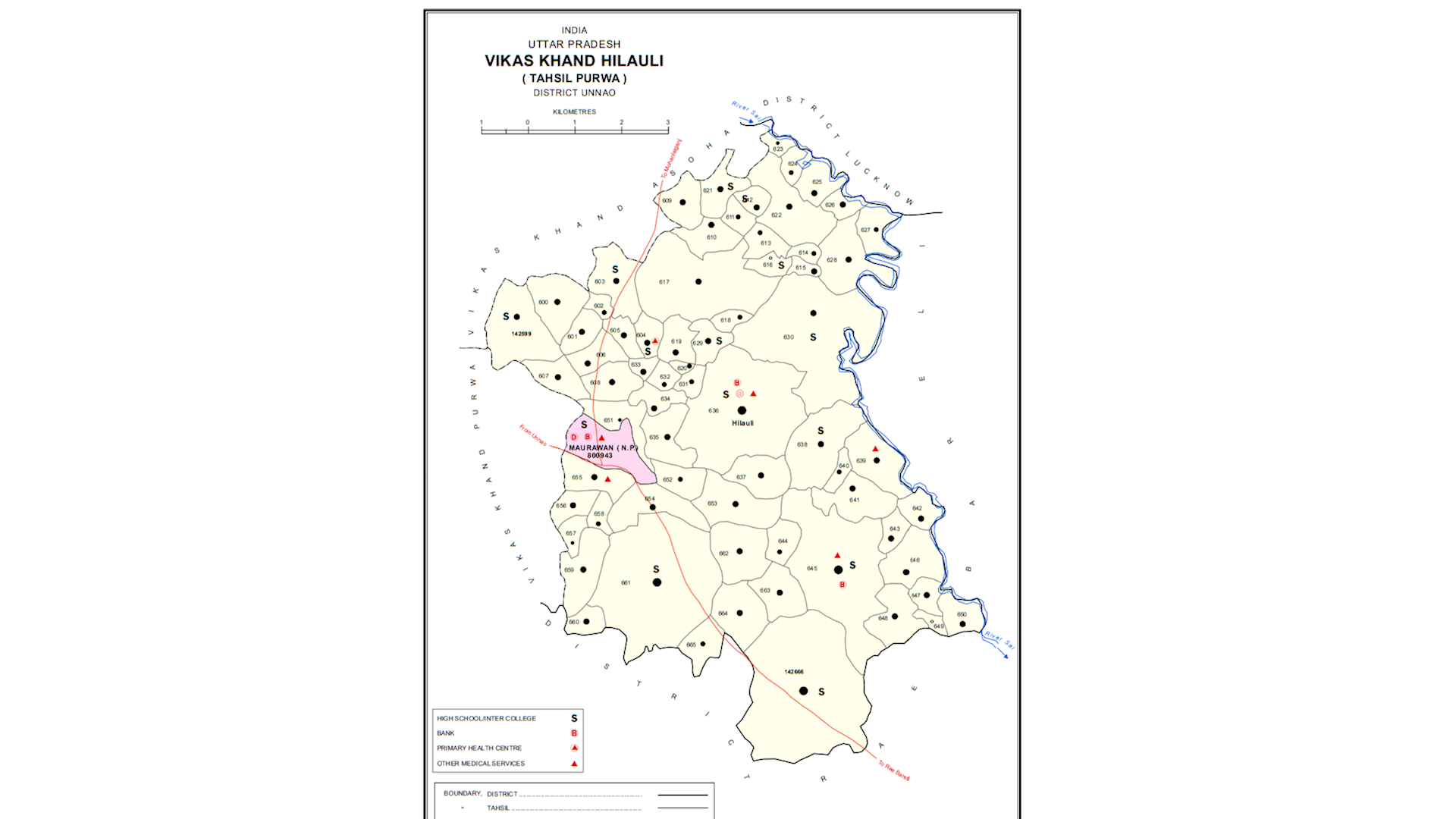
- Map showing Gulariha (#666) in Hilauli CD block

- Location in Uttar Pradesh, India
- Coordinates: 26.327596°N 80.969335°E
- Country India: India
- State: Uttar Pradesh
- District: Unnao

Area
  - Total: 24.518 km^{2} (9.466 sq mi)

Population (2011)
  - Total: 12,482
  - Density: 509.10/km^{2} (1,318.6/sq mi)

Languages
  - Official: Hindi
- Time zone: UTC+5:30 (IST)
- Vehicle registration: UP-35

Gulariha is a village in Hilauli block of Unnao district, Uttar Pradesh, India. It is a dispersed settlement with several constituent hamlets, and it is right next to the border with Rae Bareli district. The Bhundi tank is located in the village, and it provides water for irrigation. As of 2011, its population is 12,482, in 2,300 households, and it has 10 primary schools and no healthcare facilities.

== History ==
Gulariha is said to have been found sometime around the year 1350 by one Gular Singh Thakur. At the turn of the 20th century, it was described as "a large and scattered village" connected by road to Maurawan, but otherwise relatively ordinary. It had a primary school and a market. In 1901 its population was recorded as being 3,701 people, mostly from the Lodh community.

The 1961 census recorded Gulariha as comprising 15 hamlets, with a total population of 4,943 (2,554 male and 2,389 female), in 1,035 households and 788 physical houses. The area of the village was given as 6,278 acres. It had a post office then.
