= Hilauli =

- Village
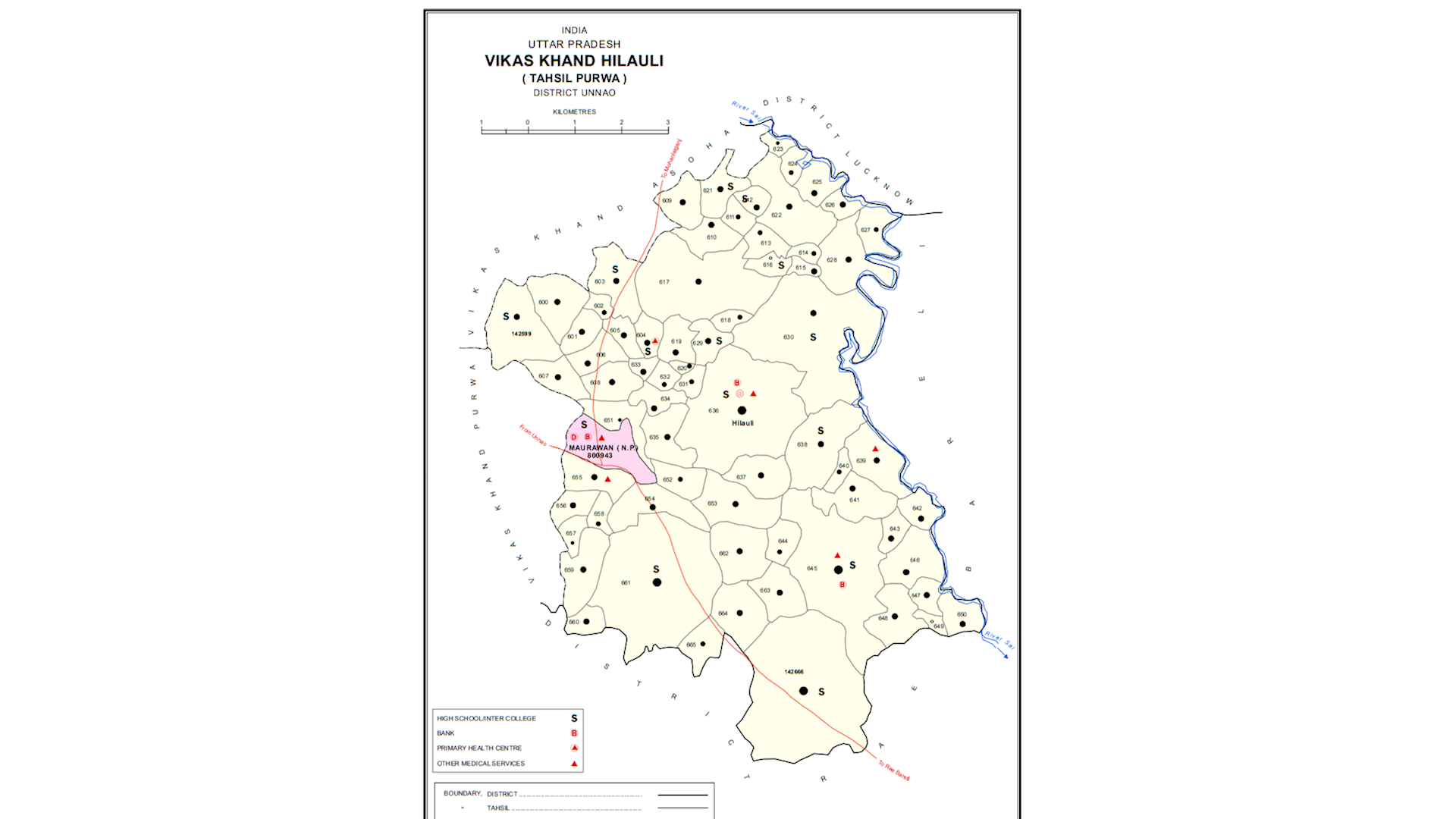
- Map of Hilauli CD block

- Location in Uttar Pradesh, India
- Coordinates: 26.45485°N 80.940234°E
- Country India: India
- State: Uttar Pradesh
- District: Unnao

Area
  - Total: 23.122 km^{2} (8.927 sq mi)

Population (2011)
  - Total: 13,318
  - Density: 575.99/km^{2} (1,491.8/sq mi)

Languages
  - Official: Hindi
- Time zone: UTC+5:30 (IST)
- Vehicle registration: UP-35

Hilauli is a village in Purwa tehsil of Unnao district, Uttar Pradesh, India. It is located on the road from Maurawan to Bachhrawan in Rae Bareli district, near the banks of the Sai. Hilauli hosts a market twice per week, on sunday and Thursdays, with grain and vegetables being the main items bought and sold. As of 2011, the population of Hilauli is 13,318, in 2,533 households.

Hilauli also serves as the headquarters of a community development block, which encompasses 68 villages (including Hilauli itself) and has a total population of 178,460 people in 32,880 households.

== History ==
According to oral tradition, Hilauli was founded by two Kayasths named Hanuman and Banwari. Folklore holds that the field of Madhab, a Thakur who once lived here, never needs irrigation, no matter how dry the weather gets. Hilauli historically lay in the pargana of Maurawan.

At the turn of the 20th century, Hilauli was described as "a very large village... pleasantly situated among mango groves in a sandy soil near the river Sai". It hosted "a considerable market" twice per week, and it had one school and a small mosque. Its population in 1901 was 4,340, with a large Chhatri population and a small Muslim minority of 260.

The 1961 census recorded Hilauli as comprising 16 hamlets, with a total population of 5,594 (2,801 male and 2,793 female), in 960 households and 860 physical houses. The area of the village was given as 6,055 acres. Average attendance of the biweekly market was about 200 people.

== Villages ==
Hilauli CD block has the following 68 villages:

Village name	Total land area (hectares)	Population (in 2011)
Deomai	825.3	3,673
Kherwa	412.3	2,367
Balia	233.1	1,464
Baretha	80.6	952
Gunamau	390	3,224
Pinduri	193	1,142
Kudra	179.9	2,147
Sagauli	269	2,048
Barwa Kalan	343	1,497
Bachhaura	364.6	2,607
Behta	275.2	1,835
Bahwa	337.7	1,909
Bhatan Khera	139.6	820
Bakspur	197	1,570
Ganga Khera	218	641
Bathua Shahpur	76.8	590
Hardi	176	1,151
Basdeo Khera	47.8	103
Para	1,623.2	7,701
Sarai Thakuri	115	671
Mardanpur	318.9	1,668
Reola	49.3	594
Musandi	277.5	2,992
Gunjauli	952.6	4,335
Khajuha	114.5	427
Lohli	135.9	827
Chilauli	299.1	1,148
Tisendha	147.4	1,110
Barenda	200.4	864
Asrenda	632.5	4,475
Pankuwar Khera	272.7	2,404
Lauwasingan Khera	2,023	9,984
Pachhim Gaon	108.9	883
Subas Khera	89	810
Asri Khera	167.4	1,042
Dund Pur	213.3	1,203
Maharani Khera	460.2	2,683
Hilauli (block headquarters)	2,312.2	13,318
Bardaha	459.5	2,529
Sandana	891.1	6,082
Kardaha	510.7	3,873
Moh Gawan	105.6	800
Chak Saraiyan	443.1	1,525
Lohra Mau	236.1	1,349
Chandakhera Digalhai	185.8	1,265
Indaura	245.2	835
Mawai	2,489	14,690
Rajwara	520.8	2,993
Khanpur	213.3	1,503
Galibpur	371.4	2,323
Chhipipur	53.7	172
Sarai Mubarak	235.3	1,320
Rasul Pur	151.2	397
Lakhan Pura	306.5	860
Ahesha	635.9	3,252
Lachhi Khera	503.4	1,488
Maurawan	1,005.5	2,093
Baraula	314.9	1,428
Kuri	153.7	375
Mirjapur	136.4	809
Jera	518.1	2,826
Patola Dasi	204.2	1,205
Akohari	2,614.6	13,167
Nari Chak	520.9	2,129
Bisara	495.8	2,838
Lotna	493.2	2,443
Jaisingh Khera	254.5	530
Gulriha	2,451.8	12,482
