= Barenda =

- Village
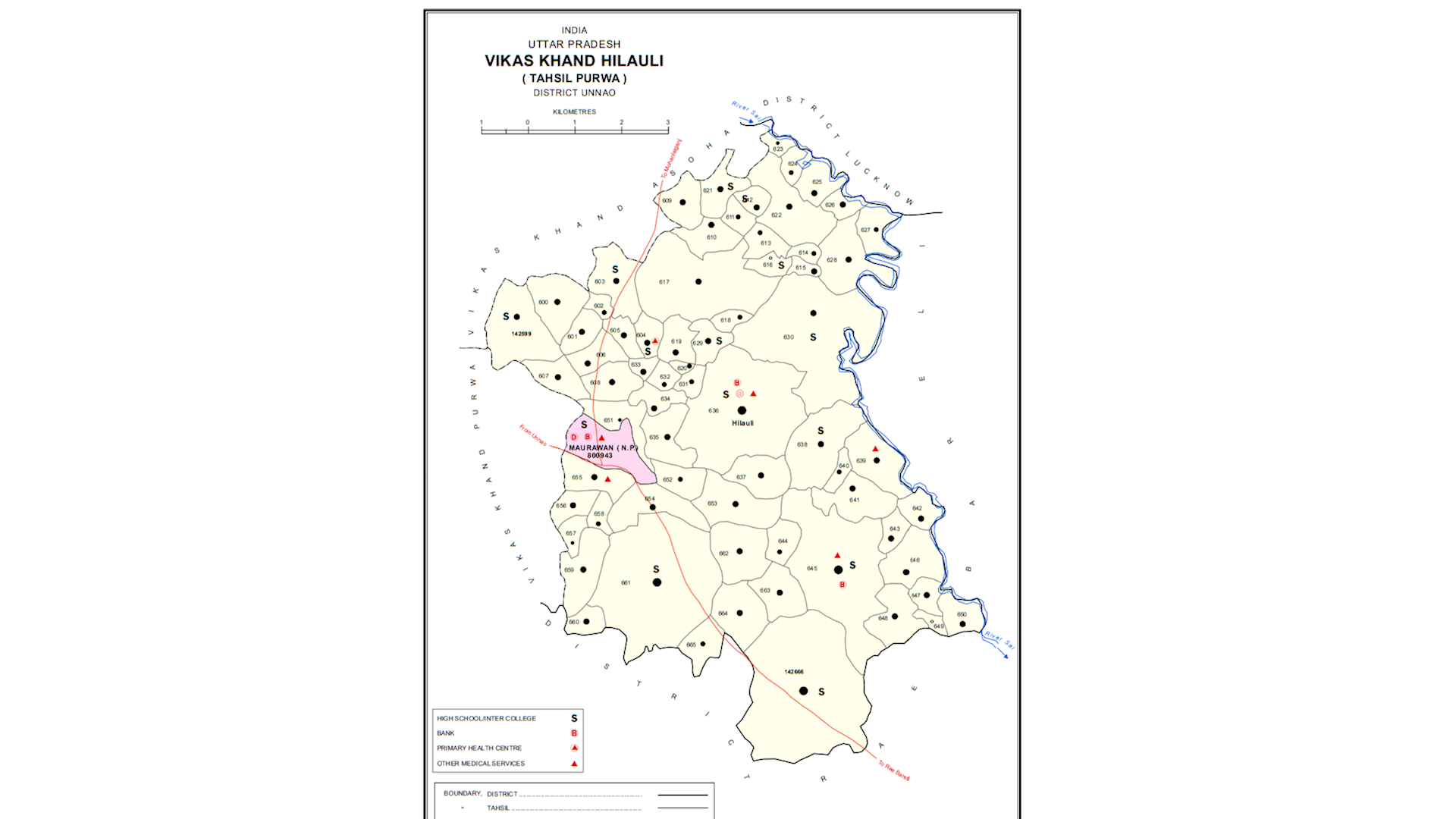
- Map showing Barenda (#627) in Hilauli CD block

- Location in Uttar Pradesh, India
- Coordinates: 26.523356°N 81.000635°E
- Country India: India
- State: Uttar Pradesh
- District: Unnao

Area
  - Total: 2.004 km^{2} (0.774 sq mi)

Population (2011)
  - Total: 864
  - Density: 431/km^{2} (1,120/sq mi)

Languages
  - Official: Hindi
- Time zone: UTC+5:30 (IST)
- Vehicle registration: UP-35

Barenda is a village in Hilauli block of Unnao district, Uttar Pradesh, India. As of 2011, its population is 864, in 174 households, and it has 2 primary schools and no healthcare facilities.

The 1961 census recorded Barenda as comprising 4 hamlets, with a total population of 245 (125 male and 120 female), in 60 households and 58 physical houses. The area of the village was given as 464 acres.
