= Subas Khera =

- Village
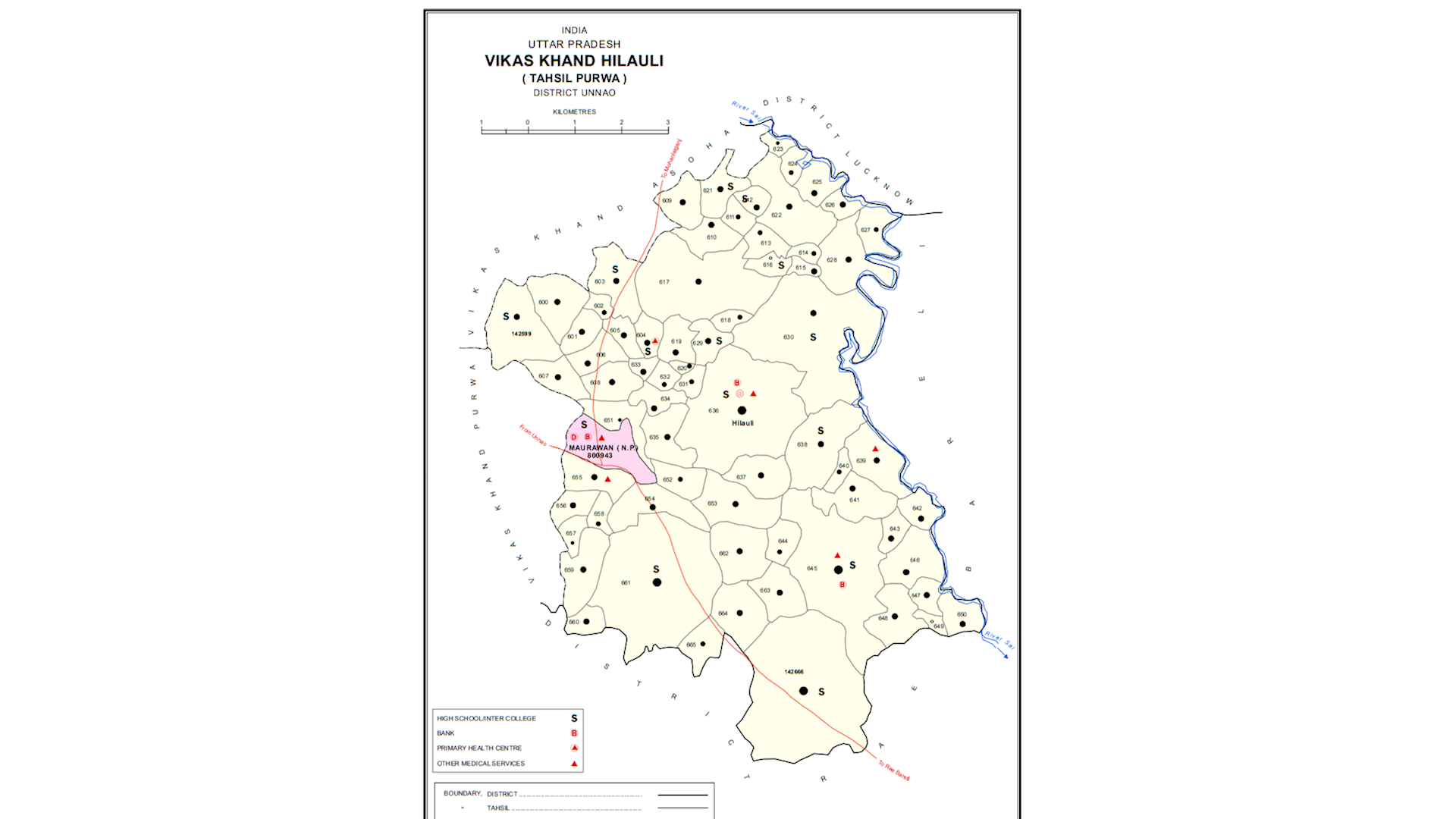
- Map showing Subas Khera (#632) in Hilauli CD block

- Location in Uttar Pradesh, India
- Coordinates: 26.462803°N 80.903688°E
- Country India: India
- State: Uttar Pradesh
- District: Unnao

Area
  - Total: 0.89 km^{2} (0.34 sq mi)

Population (2011)
  - Total: 810
  - Density: 910/km^{2} (2,400/sq mi)

Languages
  - Official: Hindi
- Time zone: UTC+5:30 (IST)
- Vehicle registration: UP-35

Subas Khera is a village in Hilauli block of Unnao district, Uttar Pradesh, India. As of 2011, its population is 810, in 168 households, and it has one primary school and no healthcare facilities.

The 1961 census recorded Subas Khera as comprising 1 hamlet, with a total population of 689 (342 male and 347 female), in 90 households and 60 physical houses. The area of the village was given as 125 acres.
