= Sarai Thakuri =

Sarai Thakuri Sarāi Thākuri
- Village
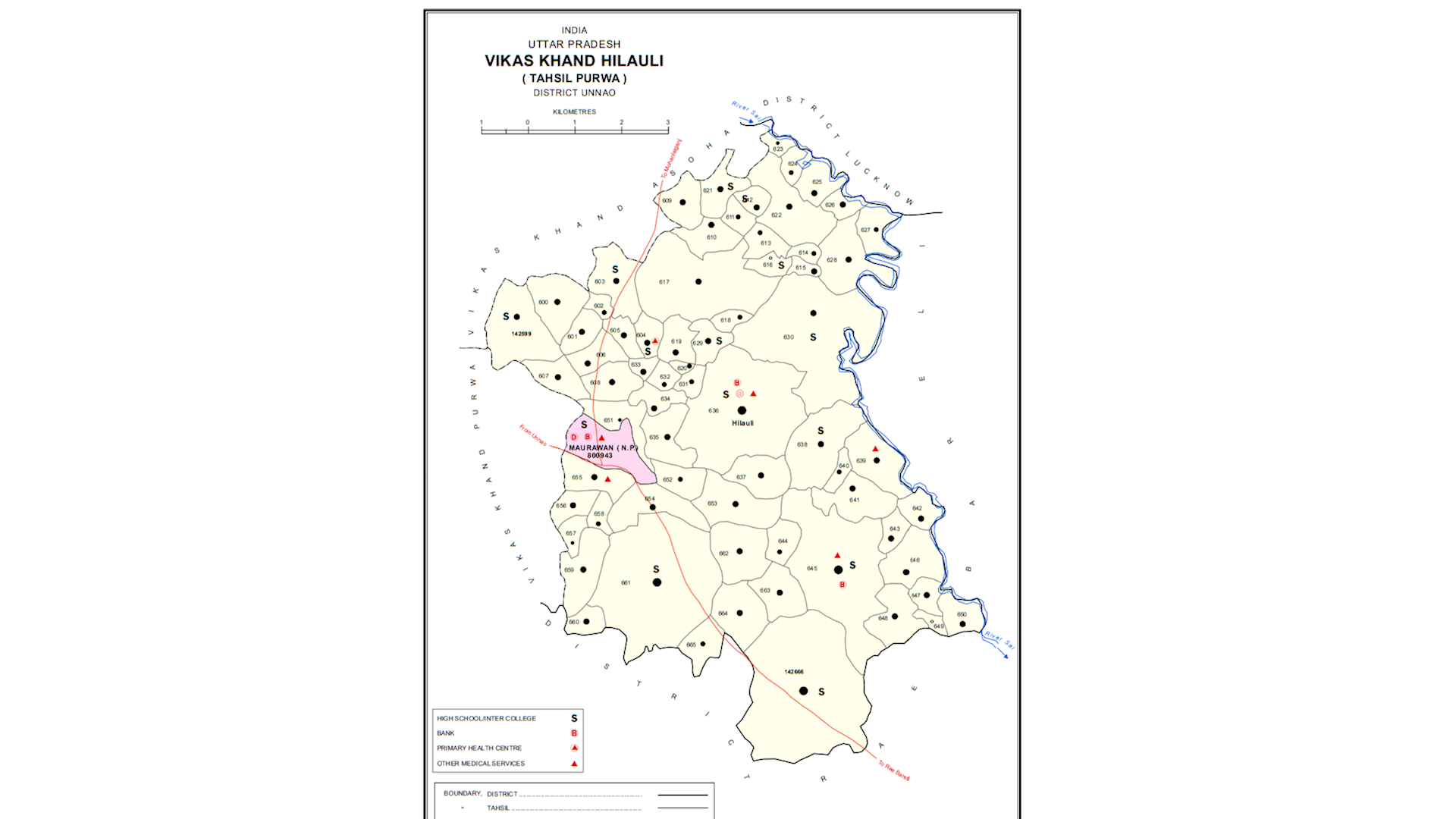
- Map showing Sarai Thakuri (#618) in Hilauli CD block

- Location in Uttar Pradesh, India
- Coordinates: 26.487157°N 80.936058°E
- Country India: India
- State: Uttar Pradesh
- District: Unnao

Area
  - Total: 1.15 km^{2} (0.44 sq mi)

Population (2011)
  - Total: 671
  - Density: 583/km^{2} (1,510/sq mi)

Languages
  - Official: Hindi
- Time zone: UTC+5:30 (IST)
- Vehicle registration: UP-35

Sarai Thakuri is a village in Hilauli block of Unnao district, Uttar Pradesh, India. As of 2011, its population is 671, in 123 households, and it has one primary school and no healthcare facilities.

The 1961 census recorded Sarai Thakuri as comprising 1 hamlet, with a total population of 386 (198 male and 188 female), in 80 households and 76 physical houses. The area of the village was given as 292 acres.
