= Chilauli, Hilauli =

Chilauli
- Village
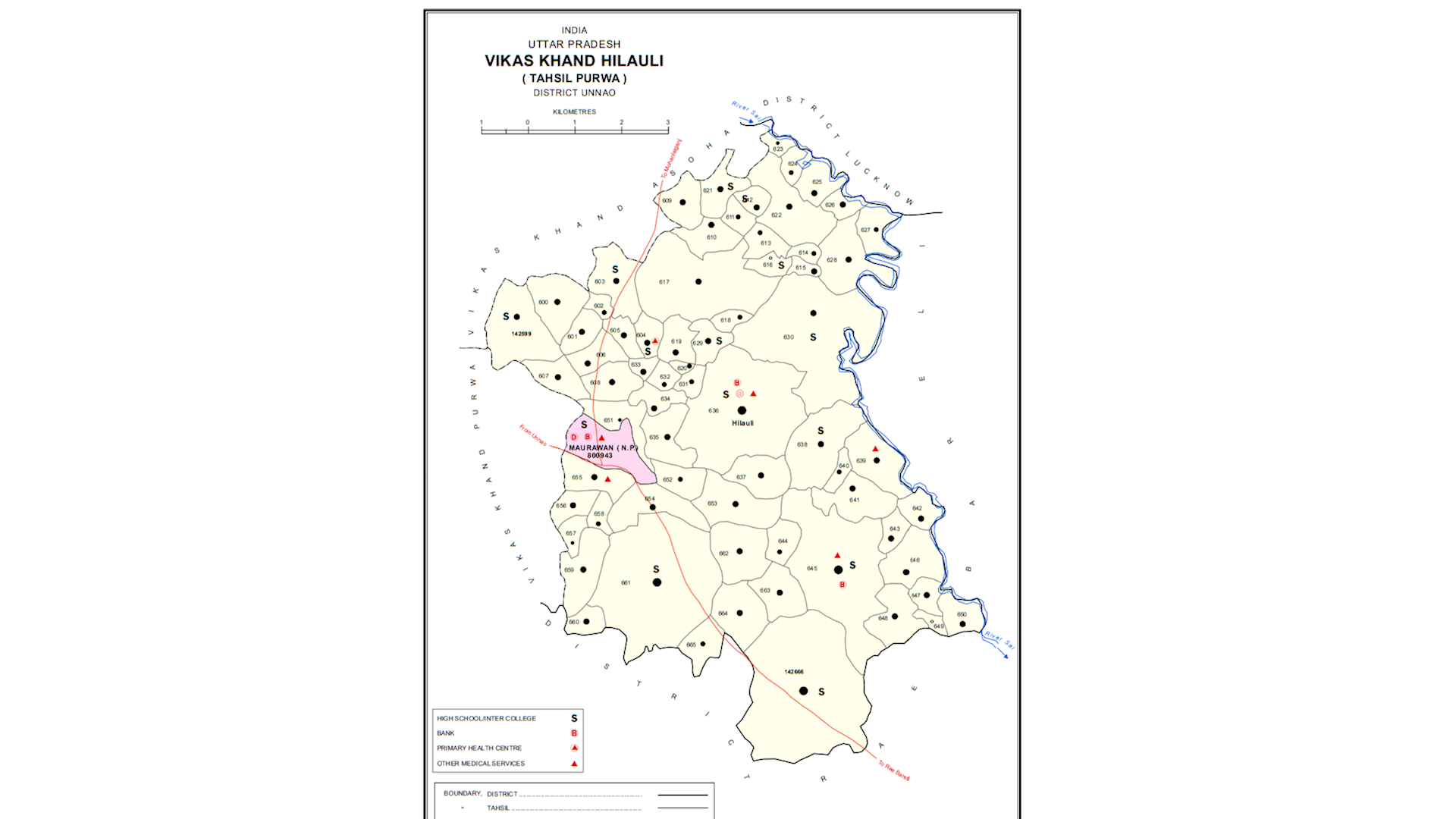
- Map showing Chilauli (#625) in Hilauli CD block

- Location in Uttar Pradesh, India
- Coordinates: 26.54406°N 80.97864°E
- Country India: India
- State: Uttar Pradesh
- District: Unnao

Area
  - Total: 2.991 km^{2} (1.155 sq mi)

Population (2011)
  - Total: 1,148
  - Density: 383.8/km^{2} (994.1/sq mi)

Languages
  - Official: Hindi
- Time zone: UTC+5:30 (IST)
- Vehicle registration: UP-35

Chilauli is a village in Hilauli block of Unnao district, Uttar Pradesh, India. As of 2011, its population is 1,148, in 236 households, and it has one primary school and no healthcare facilities.

The 1961 census recorded Chilauli as comprising 2 hamlets, with a total population of 529 (272 male and 257 female), in 100 households and 92 physical houses. The area of the village was given as 827 acres.

The 1981 census recorded Chilauli as having a population of 795 people, in 140 households, and having an area of 119.39 hectares.
