= Bhatan Khera =

Bhatan Khera Bhātan Khera
- Village
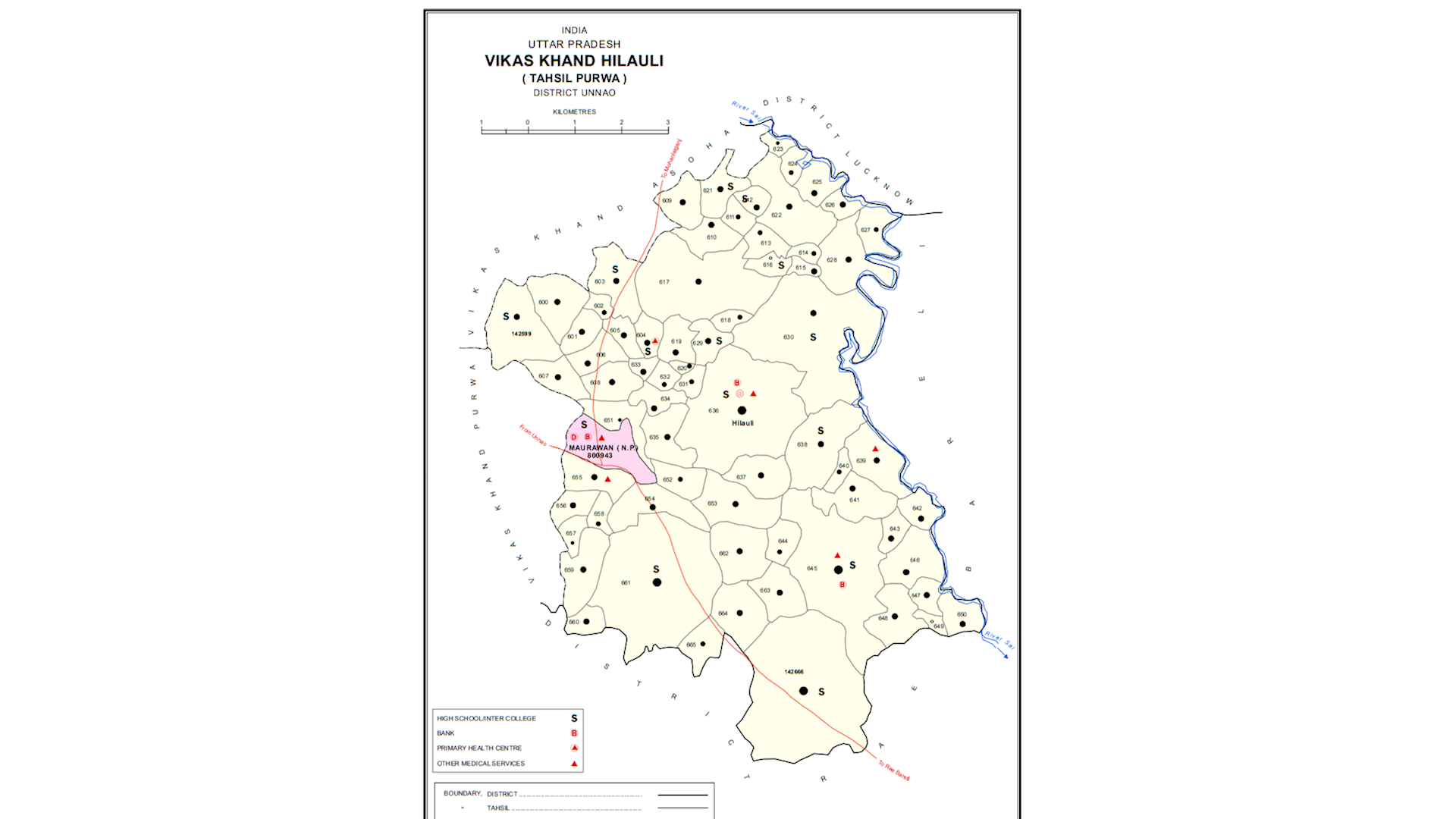
- Map showing Bhatan Khera (#611) in Hilauli CD block

- Location in Uttar Pradesh, India
- Coordinates: 26.523578°N 80.936267°E
- Country India: India
- State: Uttar Pradesh
- District: Unnao

Area
  - Total: 1.396 km^{2} (0.539 sq mi)

Population (2011)
  - Total: 820
  - Density: 590/km^{2} (1,500/sq mi)

Languages
  - Official: Hindi
- Time zone: UTC+5:30 (IST)
- Vehicle registration: UP-35

Bhatan Khera is a village in Hilauli block of Unnao district, Uttar Pradesh, India. As of 2011, its population is 820, in 174 households, and it has one primary school and no healthcare facilities.

The 1961 census recorded Bhatan Khera as comprising 1 hamlet, with a total population of 332 (165 male and 167 female), in 69 households and 60 physical houses. The area of the village was given as 358 acres.
