= Deomai =

- Village
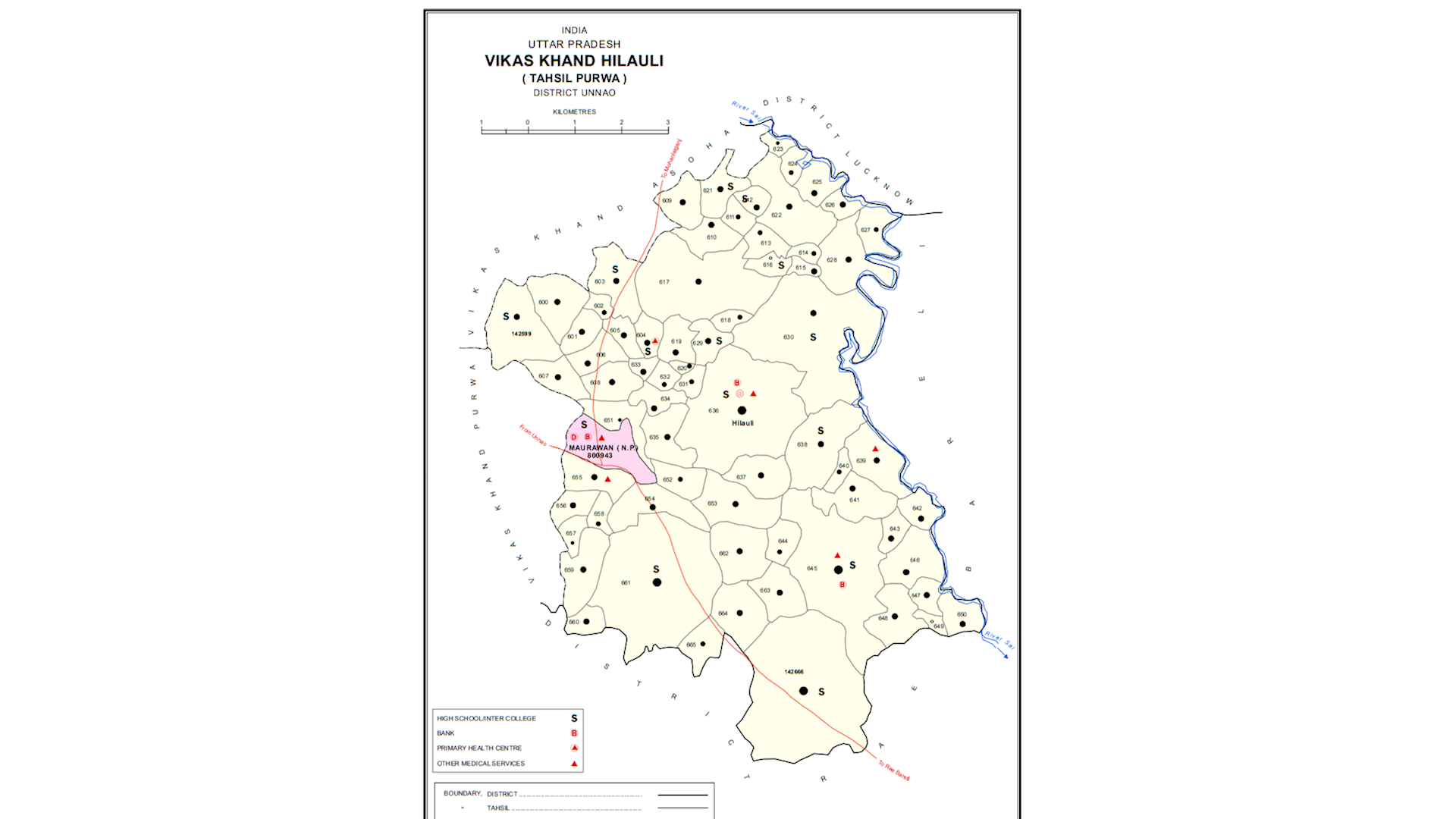
- Map showing Deomai (#599) in Hilauli CD block

- Location in Uttar Pradesh, India
- Coordinates: 26°28′44″N 80°50′43″E
- Country India: India
- State: Uttar Pradesh
- District: Unnao

Area
  - Total: 8.253 km^{2} (3.187 sq mi)

Population (2011)
  - Total: 3,673
  - Density: 445.1/km^{2} (1,153/sq mi)

Languages
  - Official: Hindi
- Time zone: UTC+5:30 (IST)
- Vehicle registration: UP-35

Deomai is a village in Hilauli block of Unnao district, Uttar Pradesh, India. As of 2011, its population is 3,673, in 743 households, and it has 3 primary schools and 2 medical practitioners. It hosts a weekly haat and has a sub post office.

The 1961 census recorded Deomai as comprising 8 hamlets, with a total population of 1,717 (893 male and 824 female), in 319 households and 268 physical houses. The area of the village was given as 2,144 acres.
