= Lotna, Unnao =

Lotna
- Village
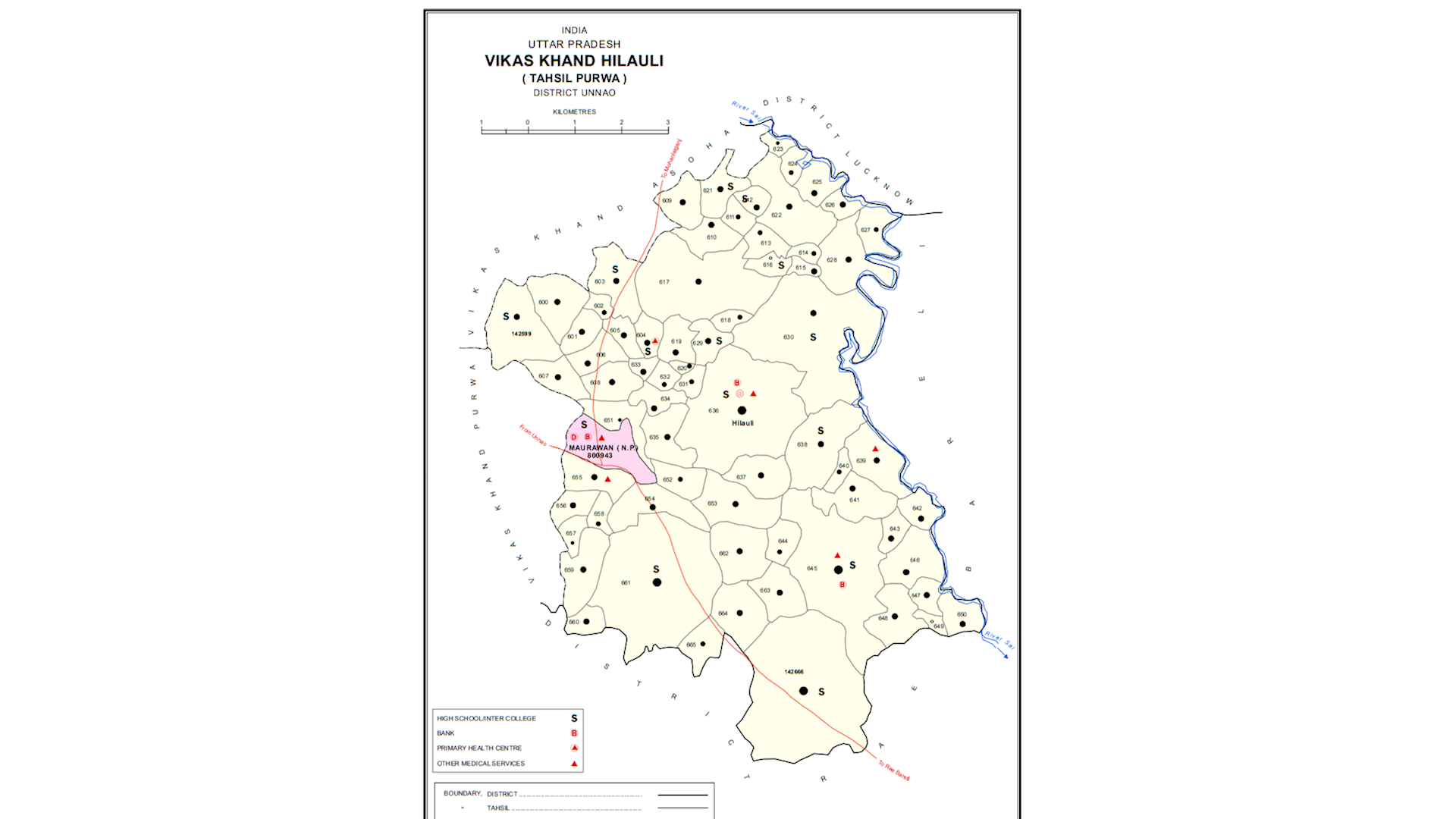
- Map showing Lotna (#664) in Hilauli CD block

- Location in Uttar Pradesh, India
- Coordinates: 26.370243°N 80.937421°E
- Country India: India
- State: Uttar Pradesh
- District: Unnao

Area
  - Total: 4.932 km^{2} (1.904 sq mi)

Population (2011)
  - Total: 2,443
  - Density: 495.3/km^{2} (1,283/sq mi)

Languages
  - Official: Hindi
- Time zone: UTC+5:30 (IST)
- Vehicle registration: UP-35

Lotna is a village in Hilauli block of Unnao district, Uttar Pradesh, India. As of 2011, its population is 2,443, in 477 households, and it has 2 primary schools and no healthcare facilities.

The 1961 census recorded Lotna as comprising 8 hamlets, with a total population of 899 (481 male and 418 female), in 155 households and 136 physical houses. The area of the village was given as 1,300 acres.
