= Lachhi Khera, Hilauli =

Lachhi Khera
- Village
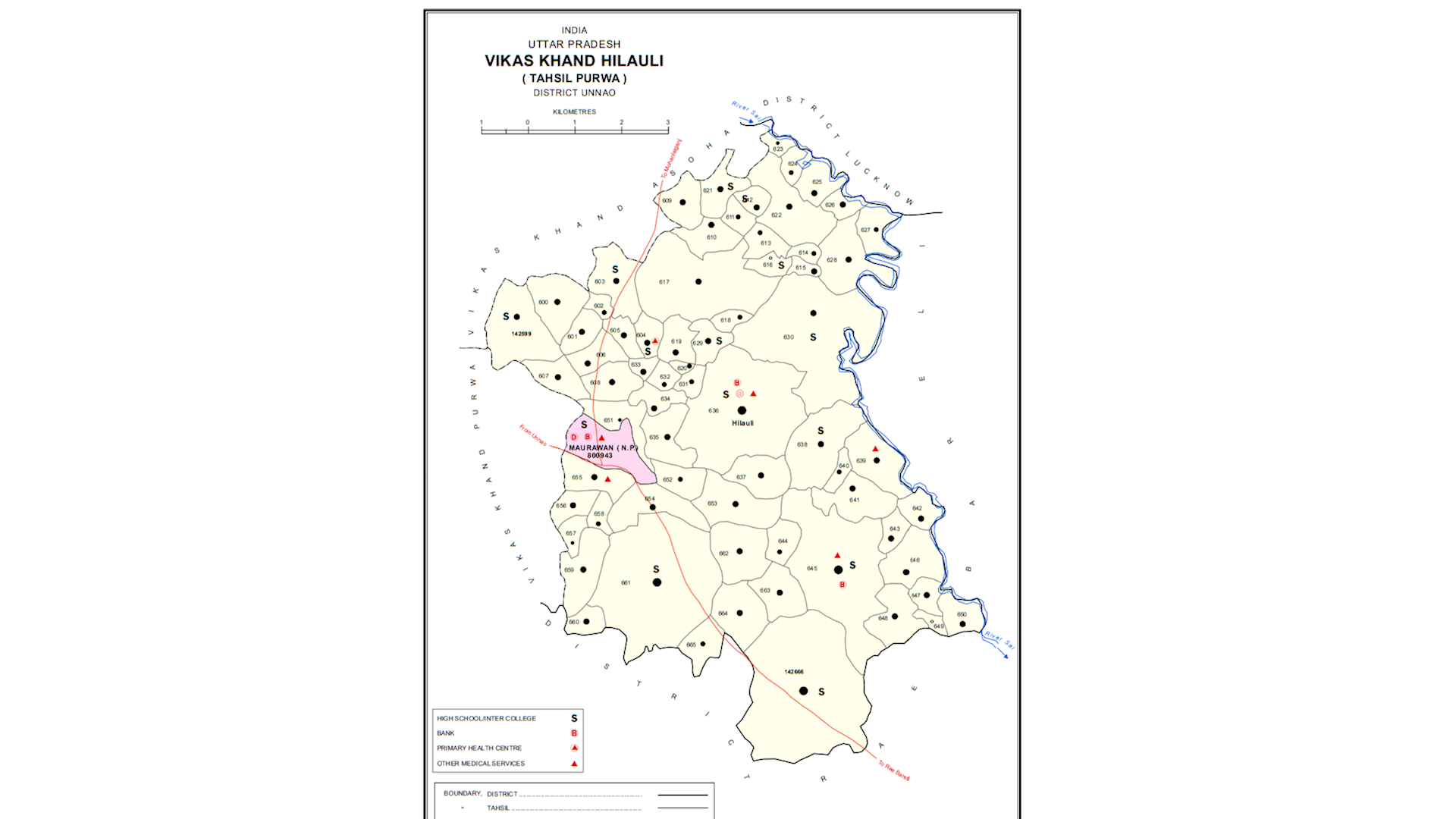
- Map showing Lachhi Khera (#654) in Hilauli CD block

- Location in Uttar Pradesh, India
- Coordinates: 26.412368°N 80.892978°E
- Country India: India
- State: Uttar Pradesh
- District: Unnao

Area
  - Total: 5.034 km^{2} (1.944 sq mi)

Population (2011)
  - Total: 1,488
  - Density: 295.6/km^{2} (765.6/sq mi)

Languages
  - Official: Hindi
- Time zone: UTC+5:30 (IST)
- Vehicle registration: UP-35

Lachhi Khera is a village in Hilauli block of Unnao district, Uttar Pradesh, India. As of 2011, its population is 1,488, in 232 households, and it has one primary school and no healthcare facilities.

The 1961 census recorded Lachhi Khera (as "Lachchi Khera") as comprising 3 hamlets, with a total population of 476 (258 male and 218 female), in 80 households and 76 physical houses. The area of the village was given as 1,366 acres.
