= Maharani Khera =

Maharani Khera Mahārāni Khera
- Village
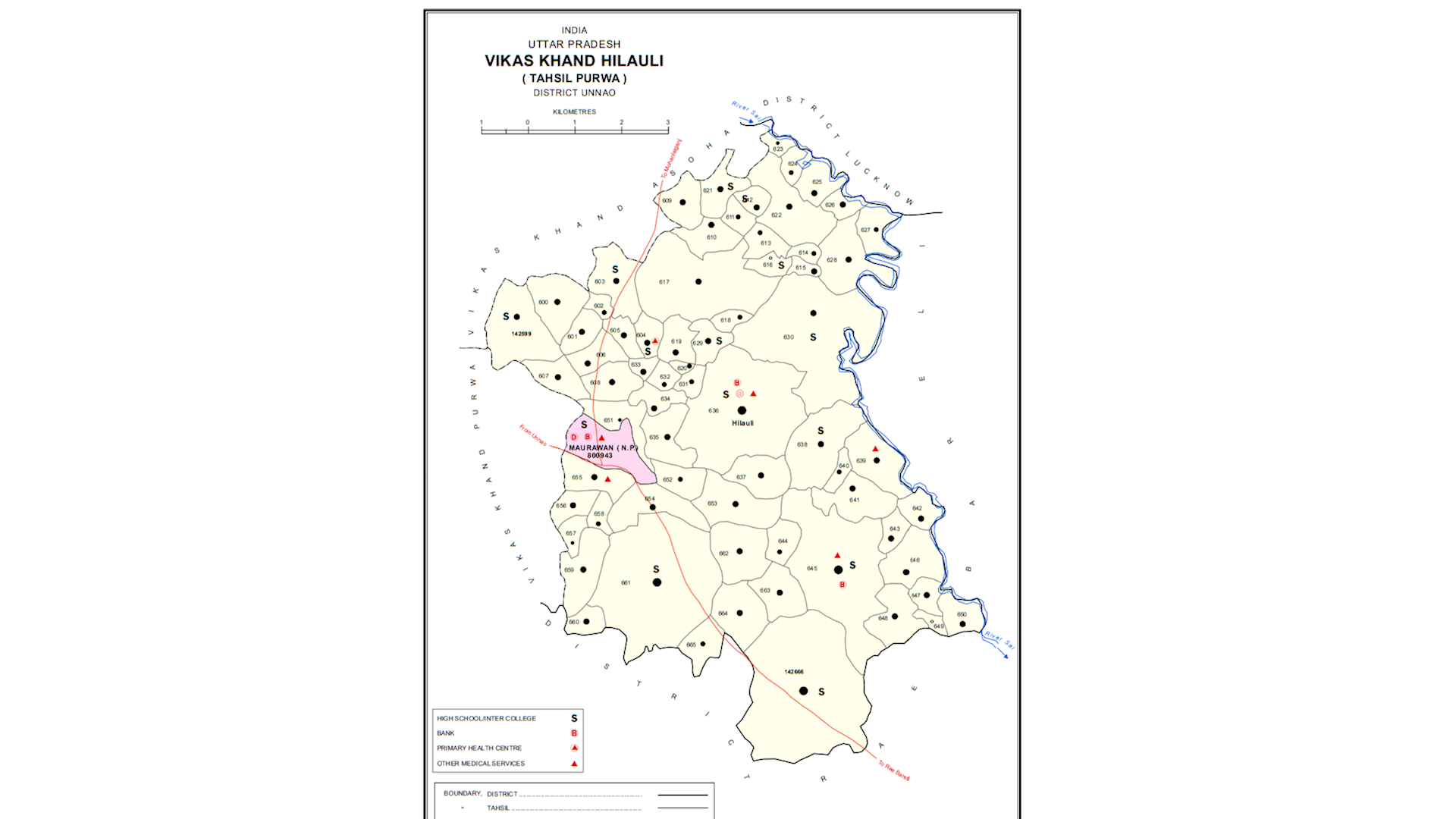
- Map showing Maharani Khera (#635) in Hilauli CD block

- Location in Uttar Pradesh, India
- Coordinates: 26.445599°N 80.91417°E
- Country India: India
- State: Uttar Pradesh
- District: Unnao

Area
  - Total: 4.602 km^{2} (1.777 sq mi)

Population (2011)
  - Total: 2,683
  - Density: 583.0/km^{2} (1,510/sq mi)

Languages
  - Official: Hindi
- Time zone: UTC+5:30 (IST)
- Vehicle registration: UP-35

Maharani Khera is a village in Hilauli block of Unnao district, Uttar Pradesh, India. As of 2011, its population is 2,683, in 502 households. It has one primary school and no healthcare facilities.

The 1961 census recorded Maharani Khera (here spelled "Mahrani Khera") as comprising 6 hamlets, with a total population of 942 (511 male and 431 female), in 210 households and 180 physical houses. The area of the village was given as 1,218 acres.
