= Para, Unnao =

Para Pāra
- Village
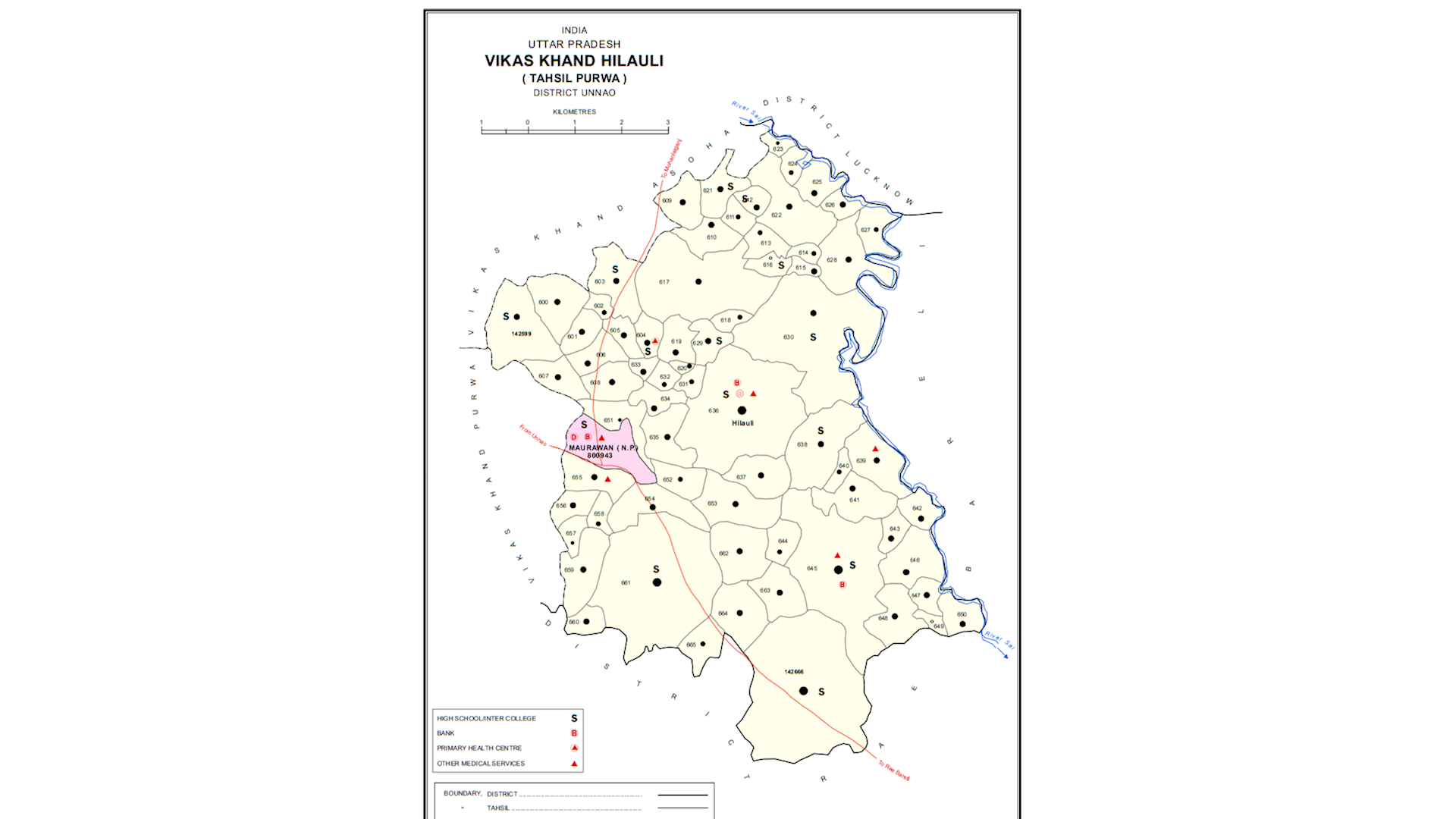
- Map showing Para (#617) in Hilauli CD block

- Location in Uttar Pradesh, India
- Coordinates: 26.502397°N 80.930641°E
- Country India: India
- State: Uttar Pradesh
- District: Unnao

Area
  - Total: 16.232 km^{2} (6.267 sq mi)

Population (2011)
  - Total: 7,701
  - Density: 474.4/km^{2} (1,229/sq mi)

Languages
  - Official: Hindi
- Time zone: UTC+5:30 (IST)
- Vehicle registration: UP-35

Para is a village in Hilauli block of Unnao district, Uttar Pradesh, India. As of 2011, its population is 7,701, in 1,262 households, and it has 6 primary schools and no healthcare facilities. It hosts a regular market and has a sub post office.

The 1961 census recorded Para as comprising 16 hamlets, with a total population of 3,252 (1,660 male and 1,592 female), in 600 households and 433 physical houses. The area of the village was given as 4,181 acres. It had a post office then.
