= Bachhaura, Hilauli =

Bachhaura
- Village
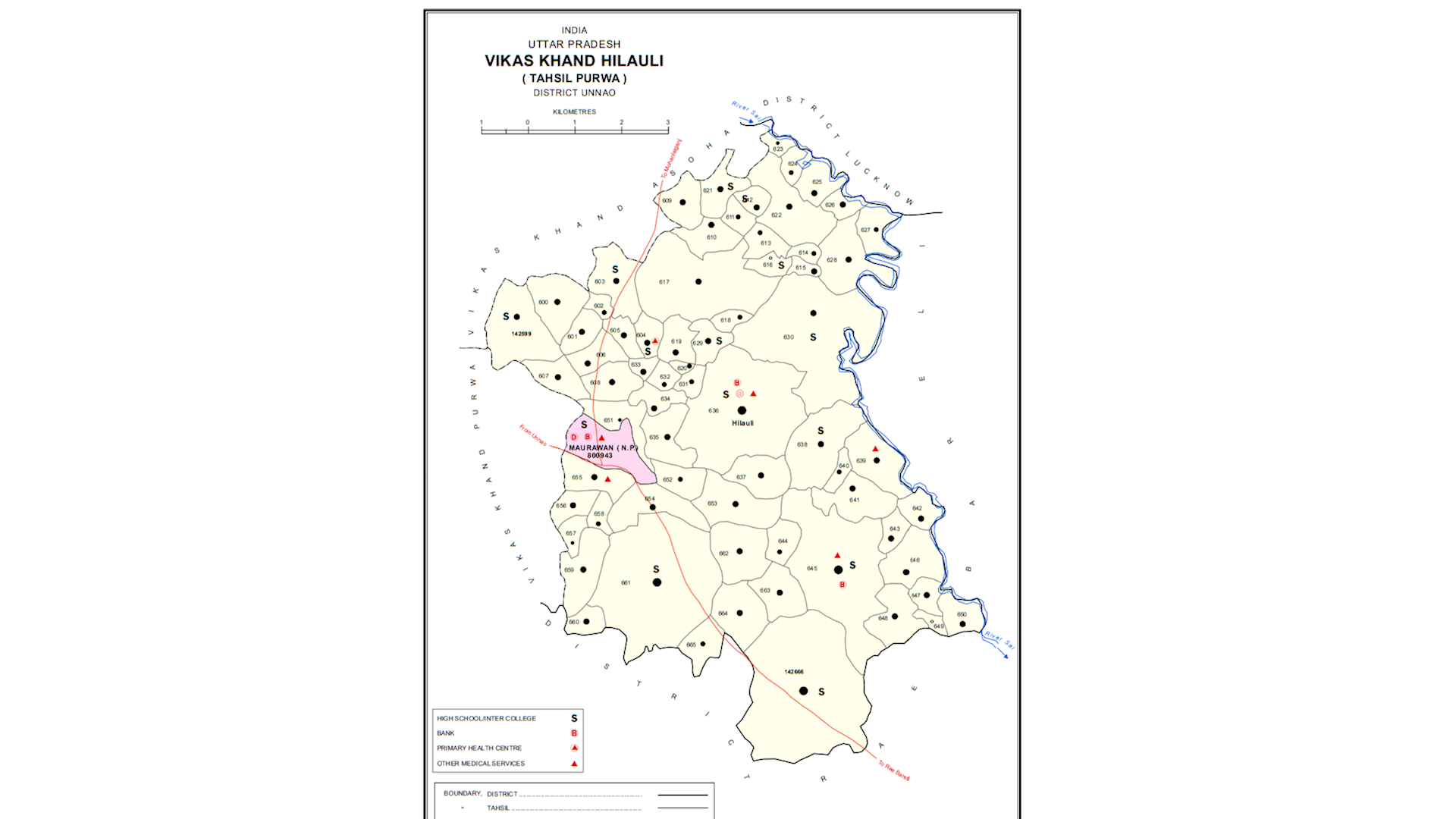
- Map showing Bachhaura (#608) in Hilauli CD block

- Location in Uttar Pradesh, India
- Coordinates: 26.458338°N 80.882595°E
- Country India: India
- State: Uttar Pradesh
- District: Unnao

Area
  - Total: 3.646 km^{2} (1.408 sq mi)

Population (2011)
  - Total: 2,607
  - Density: 715.0/km^{2} (1,852/sq mi)

Languages
  - Official: Hindi
- Time zone: UTC+5:30 (IST)
- Vehicle registration: UP-35

Bachhaura is a village in Hilauli block of Unnao district, Uttar Pradesh, India. As of 2011, its population is 2,607, in 521 households, and it has one primary schools and no healthcare facilities.

The 1961 census recorded Bachhaura (here spelled "Bachevra") as comprising 4 hamlets, with a total population of 946 (495 male and 451 female), in 209 households and 180 physical houses. The area of the village was given as 922 acres.
