= Mardanpur, Hilauli =

Mardanpur
- Village
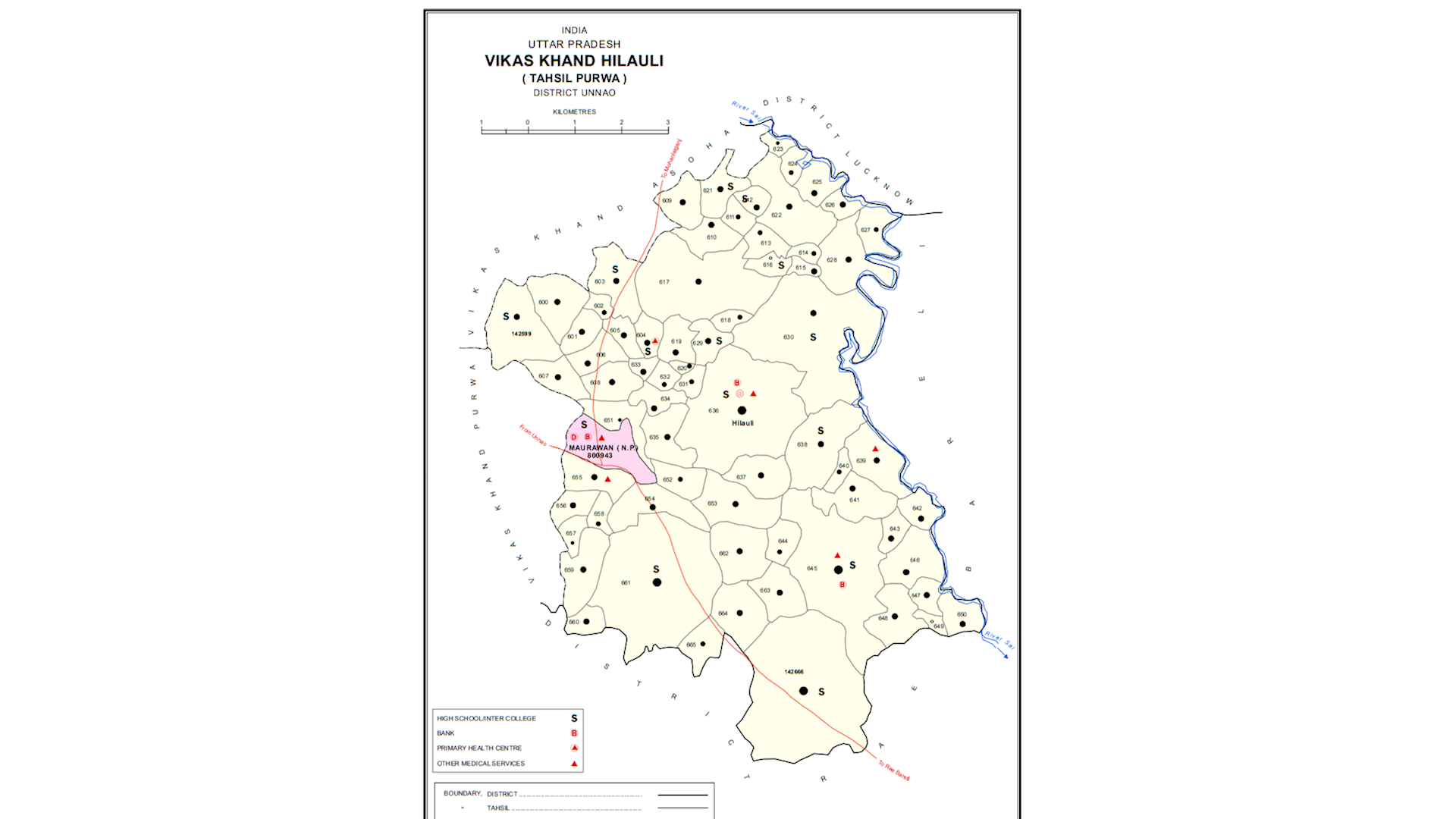
- Map showing Mardanpur (#619) in Hilauli CD block

- Location in Uttar Pradesh, India
- Coordinates: 26.472293°N 80.914122°E
- Country India: India
- State: Uttar Pradesh
- District: Unnao

Area
  - Total: 3.189 km^{2} (1.231 sq mi)

Population (2011)
  - Total: 1,668
  - Density: 523.0/km^{2} (1,355/sq mi)

Languages
  - Official: Hindi
- Time zone: UTC+5:30 (IST)
- Vehicle registration: UP-35

Mardanpur is a village in Hilauli block of Unnao district, Uttar Pradesh, India. As of 2011, its population is 1,668, in 276 households, and it has 2 primary schools and 2 medical practitioners.

The 1961 census recorded Mardanpur as comprising 3 hamlets, with a total population of 668 (353 male and 325 female), in 130 households and 116 physical houses. The area of the village was given as 823 acres.
