= Nari Chak =

- Village
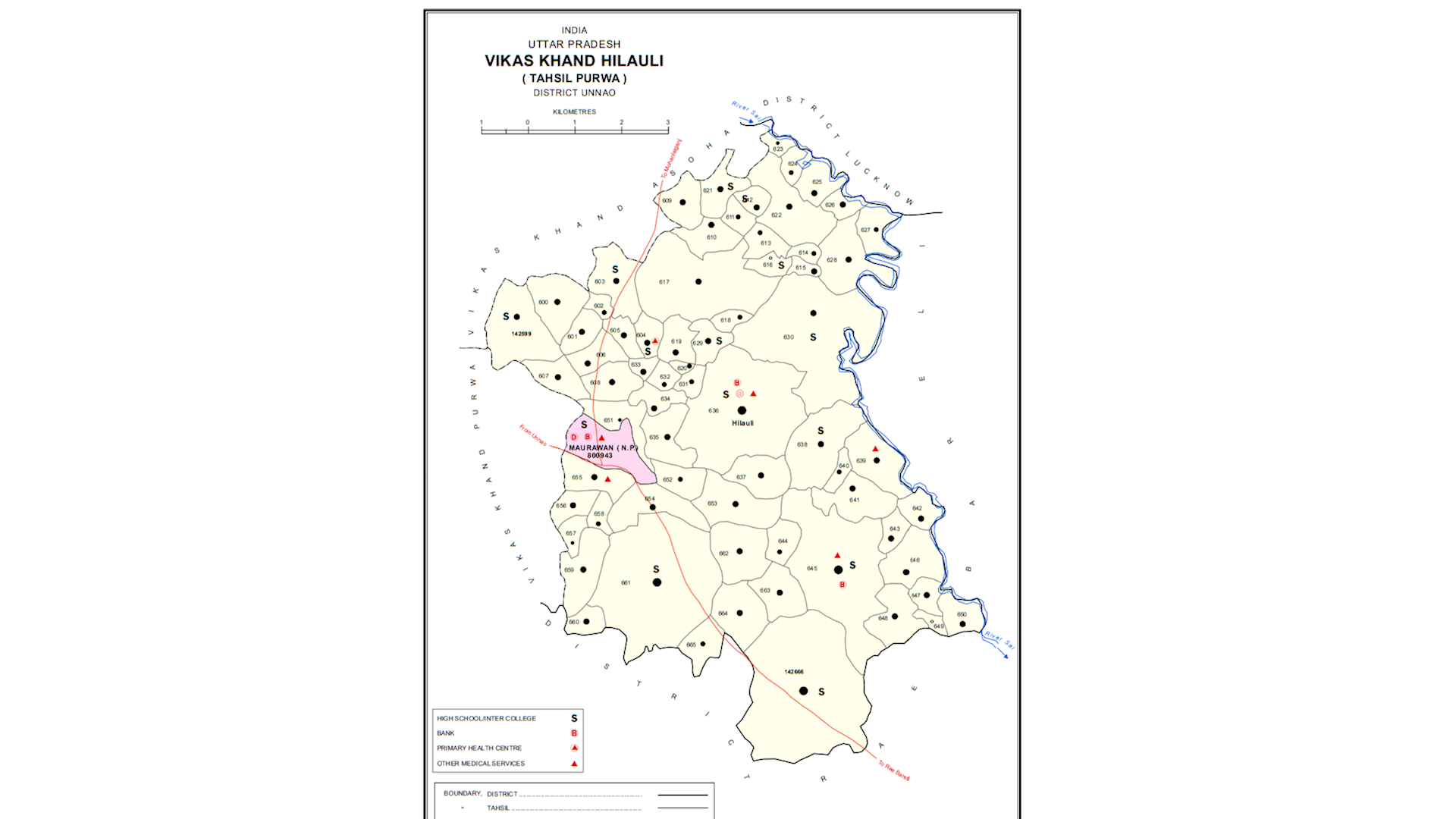
- Map showing Nari Chak (#662) in Hilauli CD block

- Location in Uttar Pradesh, India
- Coordinates: 26.389227°N 80.940802°E
- Country India: India
- State: Uttar Pradesh
- District: Unnao

Area
  - Total: 5.209 km^{2} (2.011 sq mi)

Population (2011)
  - Total: 2,129
  - Density: 408.7/km^{2} (1,059/sq mi)

Languages
  - Official: Hindi
- Time zone: UTC+5:30 (IST)
- Vehicle registration: UP-35

Nari Chak is a village in Hilauli block of Unnao district, Uttar Pradesh, India. As of 2011, its population is 2,129, in 363 households, and it has 3 primary schools and no healthcare facilities.

The 1961 census recorded Nari Chak as comprising 7 hamlets, with a total population of 1,037 (567 male and 470 female), in 190 households and 164 physical houses. The area of the village was given as 1,327 acres.
