= Lohli =

- Village
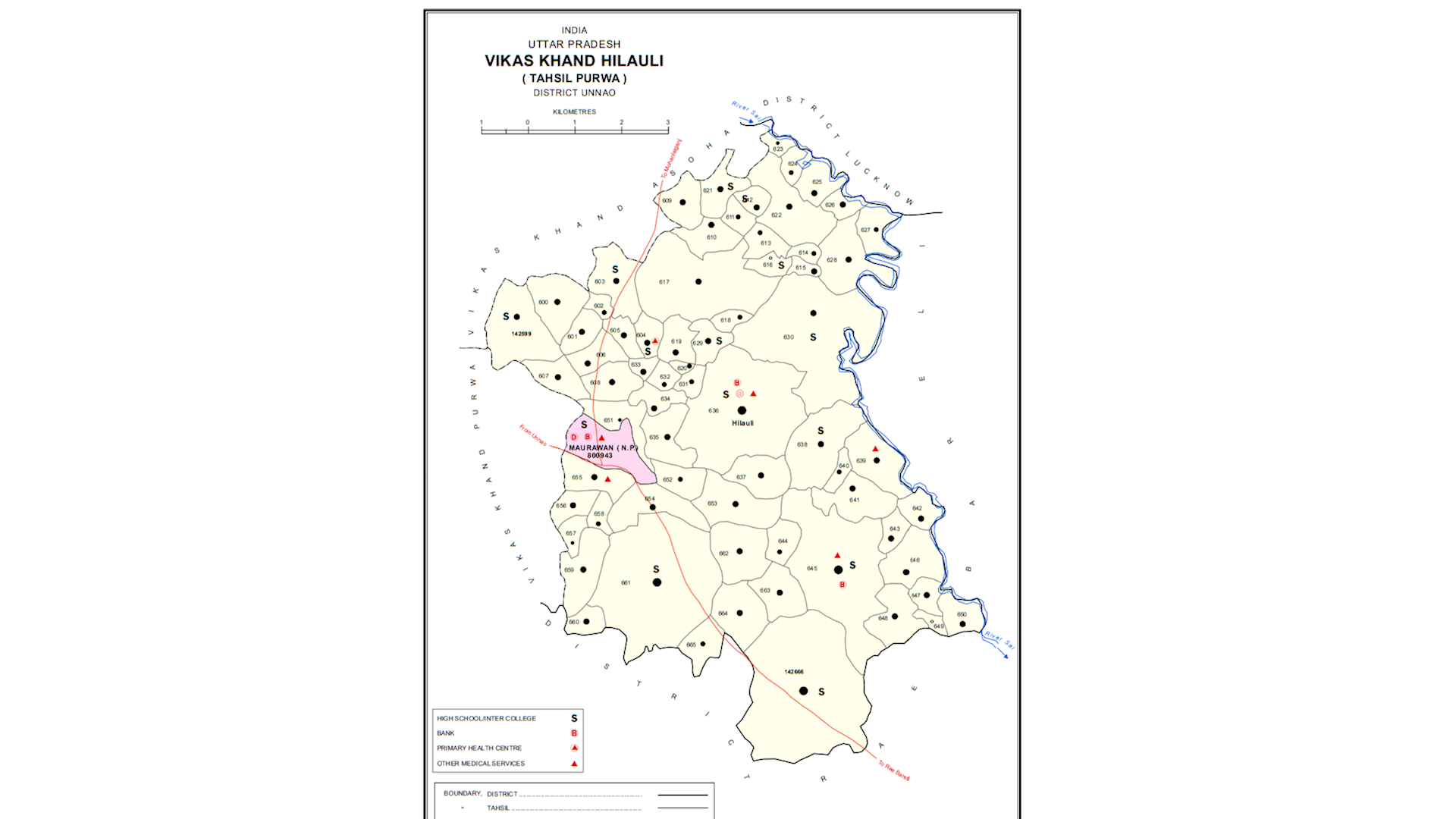
- Map showing Lohli (#624) in Hilauli CD block

- Location in Uttar Pradesh, India
- Coordinates: 26.551106°N 80.960701°E
- Country India: India
- State: Uttar Pradesh
- District: Unnao

Area
  - Total: 1.359 km^{2} (0.525 sq mi)

Population (2011)
  - Total: 827
  - Density: 609/km^{2} (1,580/sq mi)

Languages
  - Official: Hindi
- Time zone: UTC+5:30 (IST)
- Vehicle registration: UP-35

Lohli is a village in Hilauli block of Unnao district, Uttar Pradesh, India. As of 2011, its population is 827, in 147 households, and it has one primary school and no healthcare facilities.

The 1961 census recorded Lohli (here spelled "Lohali") as comprising 1 hamlets, with a total population of 234 (139 male and 95 female), in 65 households and 64 physical houses. The area of the village was given as 379 acres.
