= Reola, Unnao =

Reola
- Village
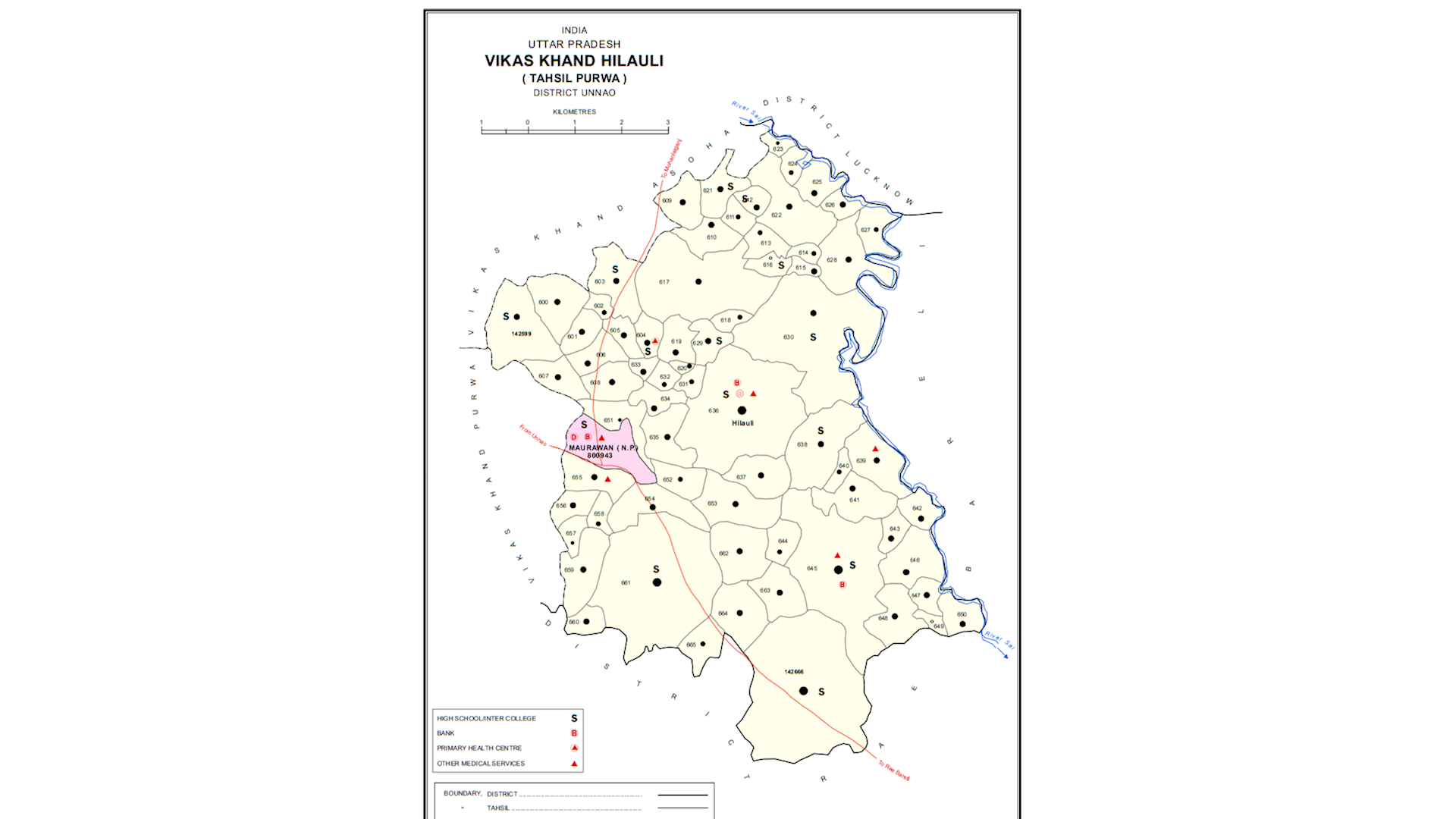
- Map showing Reola (#620) in Hilauli CD block

- Location in Uttar Pradesh, India
- Coordinates: 26.466146°N 80.913224°E
- Country India: India
- State: Uttar Pradesh
- District: Unnao

Area
  - Total: 0.493 km^{2} (0.190 sq mi)

Population (2011)
  - Total: 594
  - Density: 1,200/km^{2} (3,120/sq mi)

Languages
  - Official: Hindi
- Time zone: UTC+5:30 (IST)
- Vehicle registration: UP-35

Reola is a village in Hilauli block of Unnao district, Uttar Pradesh, India. As of 2011, its population was 594, in 105 households, and it had no schools and no healthcare facilities.

The 1961 census recorded Reola (here spelled "Reula") as comprising 3 hamlets, with a total population of 187 (101 male and 86 female), in 30 households and 30 physical houses. The area of the village was given as 121 acres.
