= Sagauli, Unnao =

Sagauli
- Village
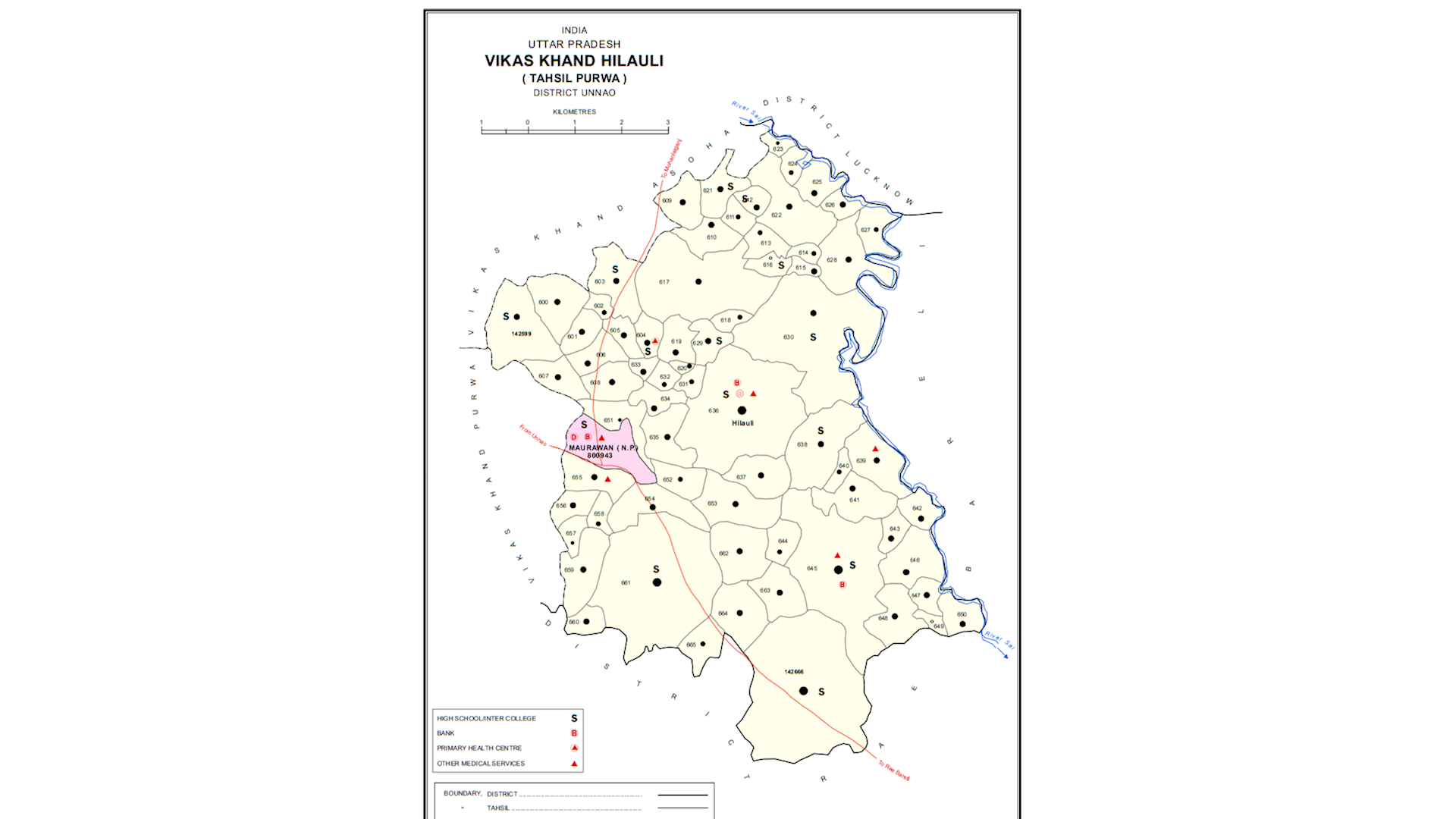
- Map showing Sagauli (#606) in Hilauli CD block

- Location in Uttar Pradesh, India
- Coordinates: 26.473292°N 80.875552°E
- Country India: India
- State: Uttar Pradesh
- District: Unnao

Area
  - Total: 2.69 km^{2} (1.04 sq mi)

Population (2011)
  - Total: 2,048
  - Density: 761/km^{2} (1,970/sq mi)

Languages
  - Official: Hindi
- Time zone: UTC+5:30 (IST)
- Vehicle registration: UP-35

Sagauli is a village in Hilauli block of Unnao district, Uttar Pradesh, India. As of 2011, its population is 2,048, in 380 households, and it has 3 primary schools and no healthcare facilities.

The 1961 census recorded Sagauli as comprising 2 hamlets, with a total population of 858 (496 male and 362 female), in 160 households and 140 physical houses. The area of the village was given as 656 acres. It had a post office then.
