= Asrenda =

- Village
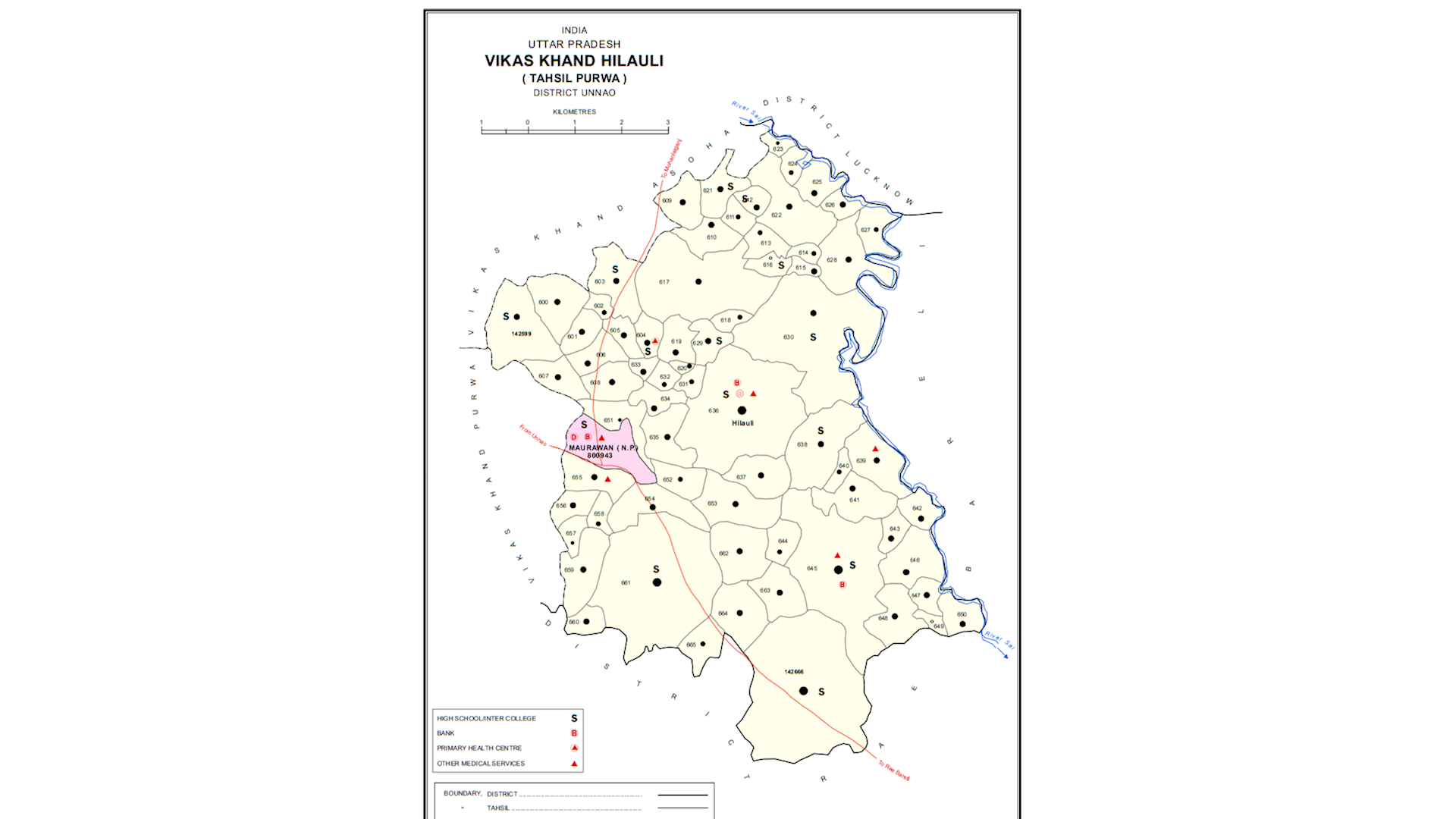
- Map showing Asrenda (#628) in Hilauli CD block

- Location in Uttar Pradesh, India
- Coordinates: 26.516626°N 80.993344°E
- Country India: India
- State: Uttar Pradesh
- District: Unnao

Area
  - Total: 6.235 km^{2} (2.407 sq mi)

Population (2011)
  - Total: 4,475
  - Density: 717.7/km^{2} (1,859/sq mi)

Languages
  - Official: Hindi
- Time zone: UTC+5:30 (IST)
- Vehicle registration: UP-35

Asrenda is a village in Hilauli block of Unnao district, Uttar Pradesh, India. As of 2011, its population is 4,475, in 782 households, and it has 2 primary schools and no healthcare facilities.

The 1961 census recorded Asrenda as comprising 3 hamlets, with a total population of 2,047 (1,053 male and 994 female), in 355 households and 306 physical houses. The area of the village was given as 1,551 acres.
