= Sandana =

Sandana Sandāna
- Village
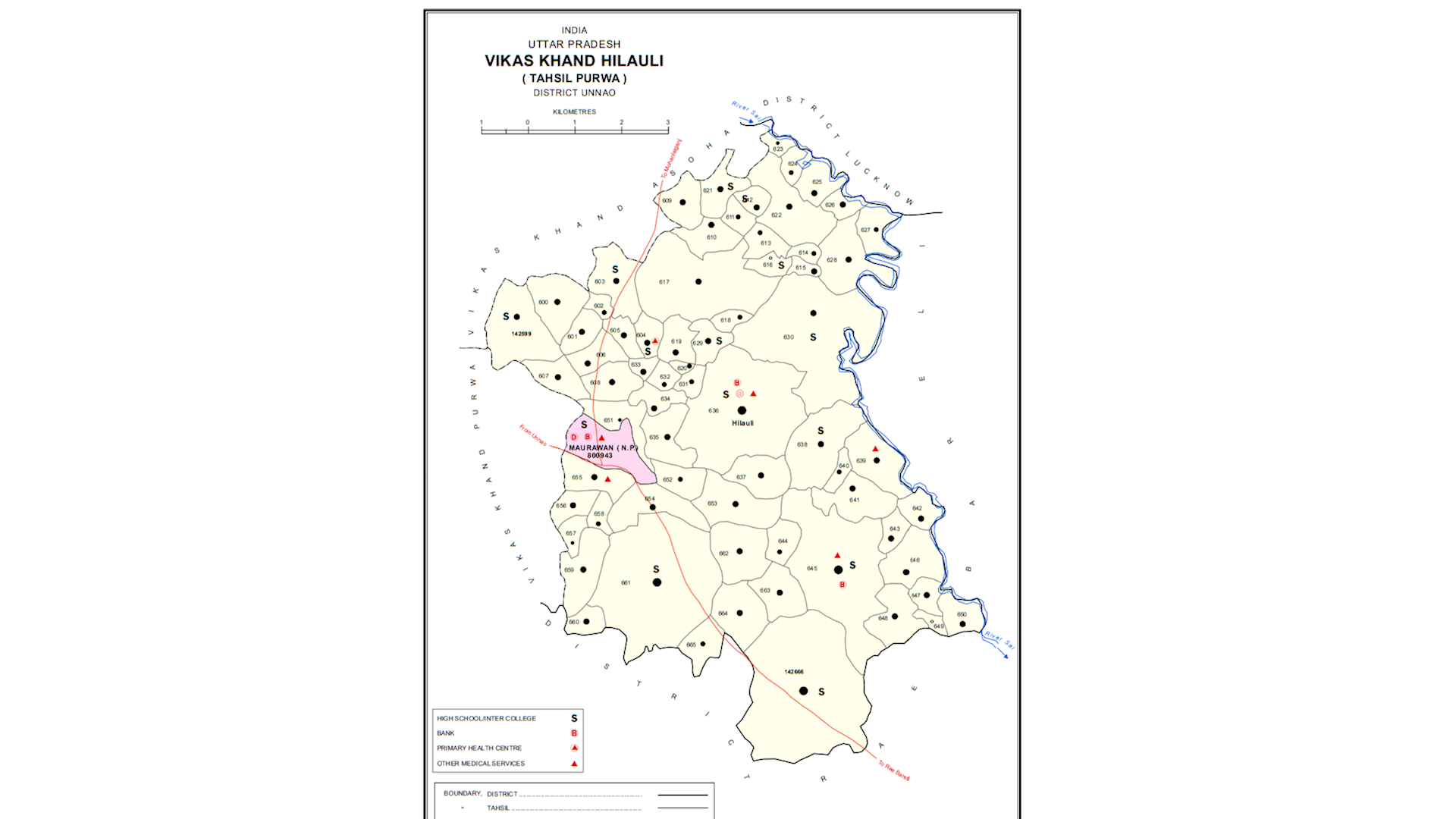
- Map showing Sandana (#638) in Hilauli CD block

- Location in Uttar Pradesh, India
- Coordinates: 26.434361°N 80.98029°E
- Country India: India
- State: Uttar Pradesh
- District: Unnao

Area
  - Total: 8.911 km^{2} (3.441 sq mi)

Population (2011)
  - Total: 6,082
  - Density: 682.5/km^{2} (1,768/sq mi)

Languages
  - Official: Hindi
- Time zone: UTC+5:30 (IST)
- Vehicle registration: UP-35

Sandana is a village in Hilauli block of Unnao district, Uttar Pradesh, India. As of 2011, its population is 6,082, in 1,184 households, and it has 3 primary schools and no healthcare facilities.

The 1961 census recorded Sandana as comprising 15 hamlets, with a total population of 3,454 (1,831 male and 1,623 female), in 570 households and 474 physical houses. The area of the village was given as 2,289 acres.
