= Mawai, Hilauli =

Mawai
- Village
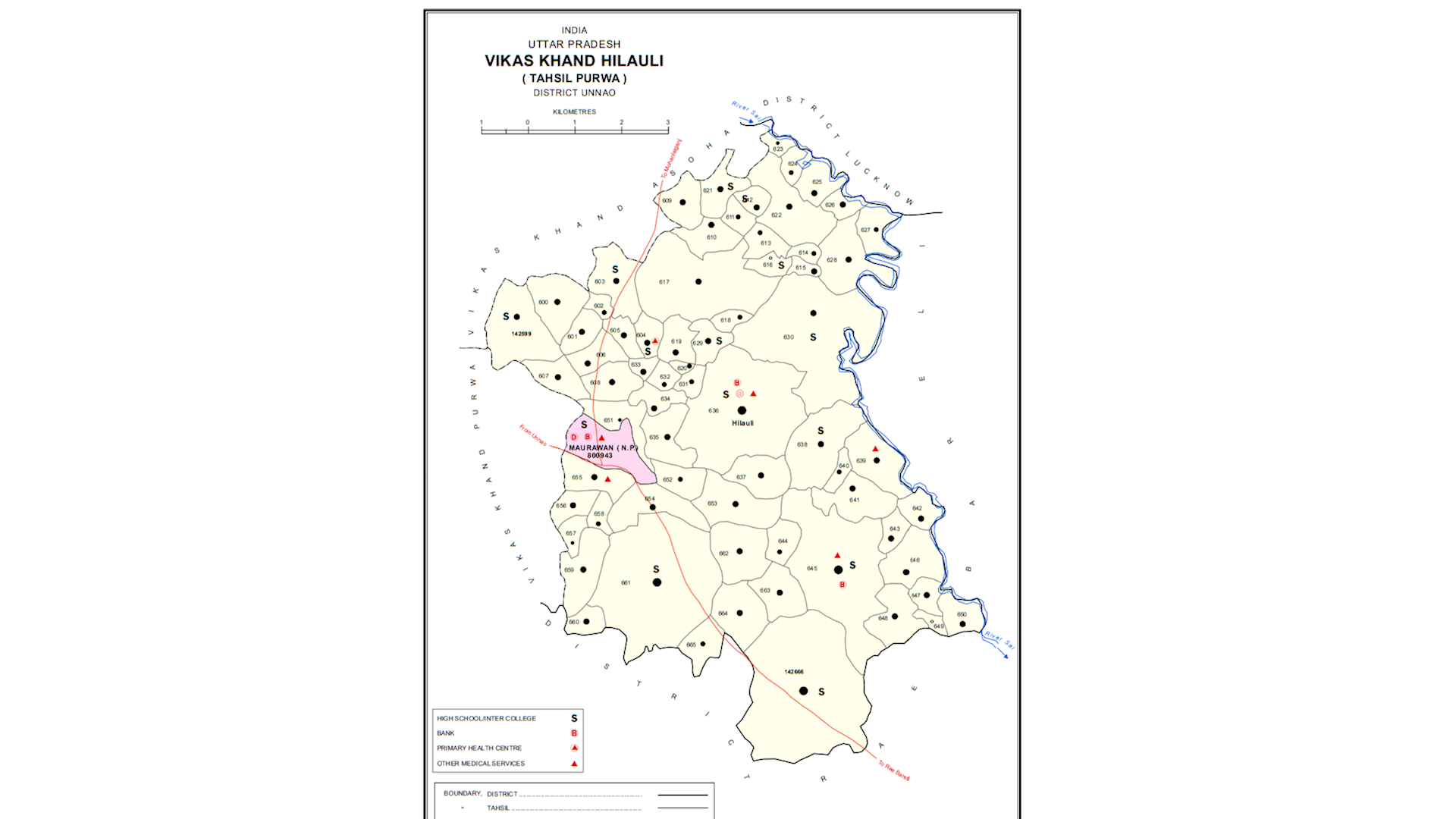
- Map showing Mawai (#645) in Hilauli CD block

- Location in Uttar Pradesh, India
- Coordinates: 26.386631°N 80.99528°E
- Country India: India
- State: Uttar Pradesh
- District: Unnao

Area
  - Total: 24.89 km^{2} (9.61 sq mi)

Population (2011)
  - Total: 14,690
  - Density: 590.2/km^{2} (1,529/sq mi)

Languages
  - Official: Hindi
- Time zone: UTC+5:30 (IST)
- Vehicle registration: UP-35

Mawai is a village in Hilauli block of Unnao district, Uttar Pradesh, India. As of 2011, its population is 14,690, in 2,734 households, and it has 8 primary schools and one medical clinic. It hosts a regular market and has a post office.

== History ==
Mawai was founded by Man Singh, a Dikhit Chhatri from Simauni in what is now Banda district. It was previously the site of a Bhar fort, which Man Singh conquered and razed to the ground. He received the land as a jagir from the king in Delhi and founded a village on the site, which he named after himself. His descendants founded various kheras around Mawai, and for a long time they also held qabuliats in the village. At some point, the Dikhits gifted the village to an ancestor of one Sheikh Mansur.

At the turn of the 20th century, Mawai was described as a large, dispersed settlement in the southeastern part of the pargana of Maurawan. It lay off the main roads and had no bazar, and it was mostly significant for its large size. The 1901 census recorded its population as 4,363 people, including a Muslim minority of 256.

The 1961 census recorded Mawai as comprising 19 hamlets, with a total population of 5,940 people (2,854 male and 2,636 female), in 965 households and 860 physical houses. The area of the village was given as 6,503 acres. It had a medical practitioner and post office then. There were two grain mills, one small establishment producing edible fats/oils, two miscellaneous food processing facilities, one small manufacturer of ammunition, fireworks, or other explosives, one bicycle repair shop, two places making clocks and/or watches, and two small manufacturers of jewellery or precious metal objects. It hosted a biweekly haat on Wednesdays and Thursdays where grain and vegetables were the main items of trade, and its average attendance was around 250 people at the time.
