= Mavia =

Mavia may refer to:

- Mavia (queen), Arab queen from the 4th century CE
- Mavia (genus), a classification of insects
- Makonde language
- Mav̋ea language
- Mavea, an island in Vanuatu
- "Mavia", a character from Love from a Stranger (1947 film)

== See also ==
- Mawai (disambiguation)
