= Bathua Shahpur =

Bathua Shahpur Bathua Shāhpur
- Village
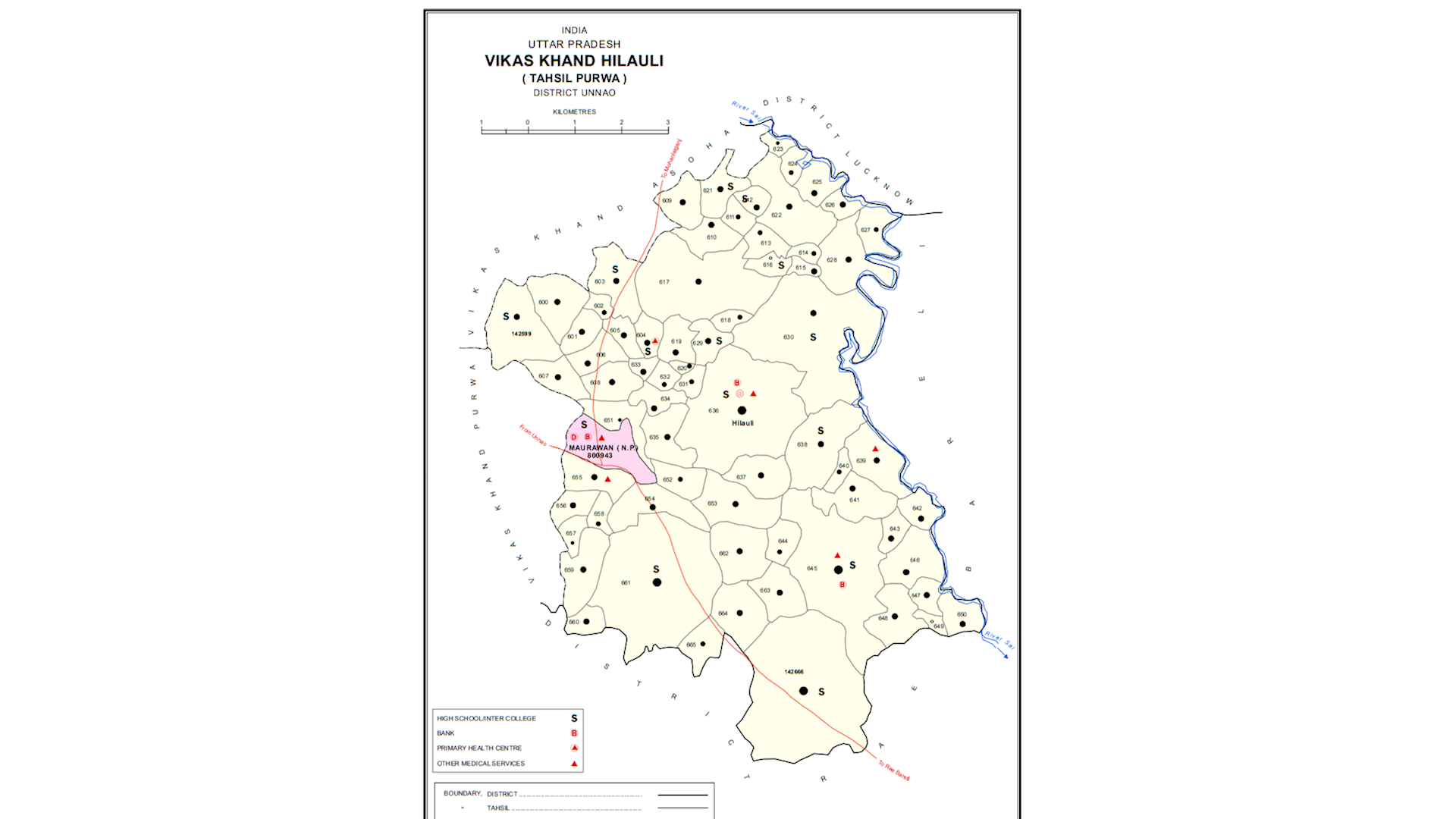
- Map showing Bathua Shahpur (#614) in Hilauli CD block

- Location in Uttar Pradesh, India
- Coordinates: 26.516147°N 80.972288°E
- Country India: India
- State: Uttar Pradesh
- District: Unnao

Area
  - Total: 0.768 km^{2} (0.297 sq mi)

Population (2011)
  - Total: 590
  - Density: 770/km^{2} (2,000/sq mi)

Languages
  - Official: Hindi
- Time zone: UTC+5:30 (IST)
- Vehicle registration: UP-35

Bathua Shahpur is a village in Hilauli block of Unnao district, Uttar Pradesh, India. As of 2011, its population is 590, in 116 households, and it has no schools and no healthcare facilities.

The 1961 census recorded Bathua Shahpur (as "Batwa Shahpur") as comprising 1 hamlet, with a total population of 253 (141 male and 112 female), in 60 households and 57 physical houses. The area of the village was given as 195 acres.
