= Basdeo Khera =

Basdeo Khera Bāsdeo Khera
- Village
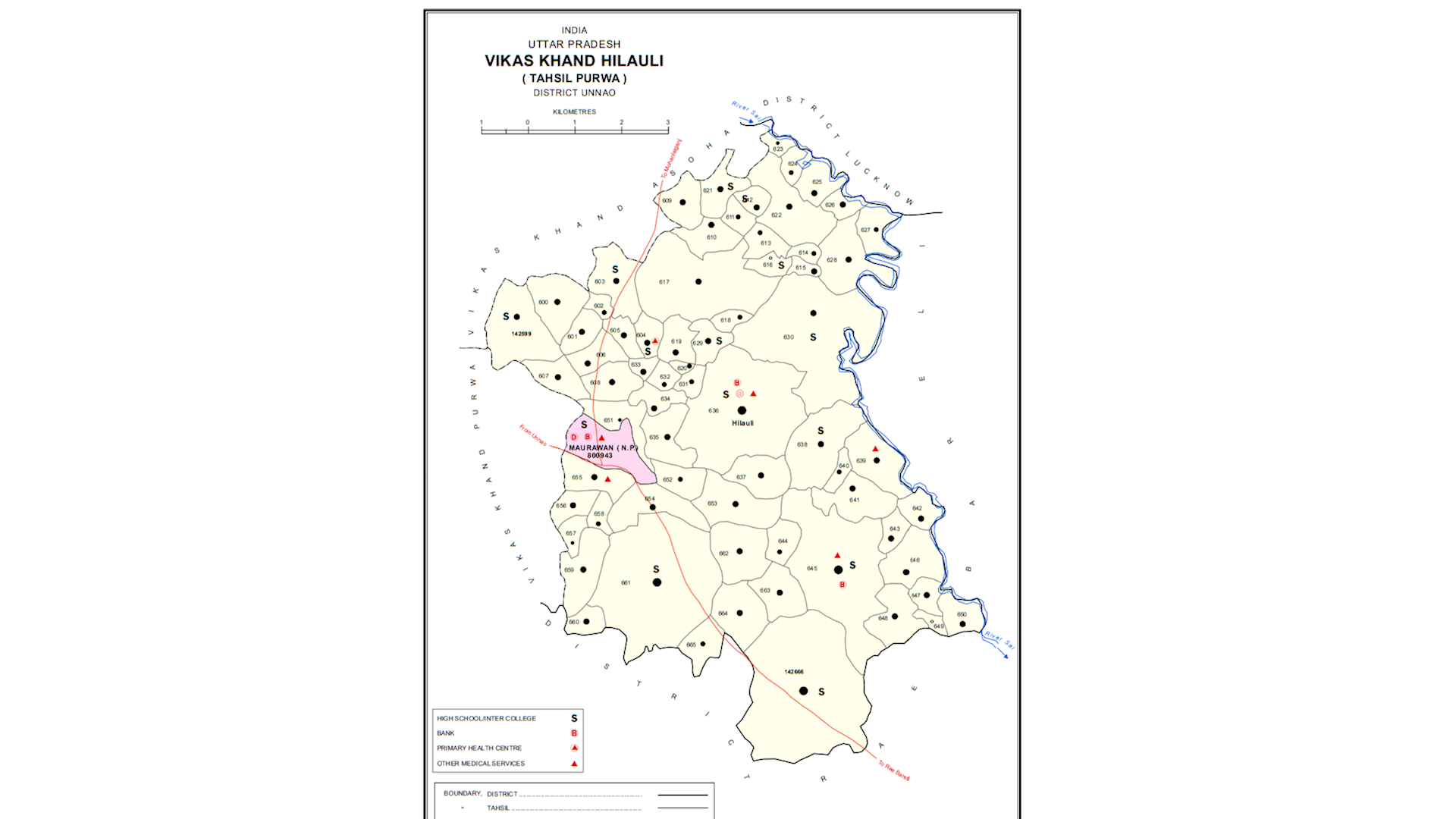
- Map showing Basdeo Khera (#616) in Hilauli CD block

- Location in Uttar Pradesh, India
- Coordinates: 26.506047°N 80.950897°E
- Country India: India
- State: Uttar Pradesh
- District: Unnao

Area
  - Total: 0.478 km^{2} (0.185 sq mi)

Population (2011)
  - Total: 103
  - Density: 215/km^{2} (558/sq mi)

Languages
  - Official: Hindi
- Time zone: UTC+5:30 (IST)
- Vehicle registration: UP-35

Basdeo Khera is a village in Hilauli block of Unnao district, Uttar Pradesh, India. As of 2011, its population is 103, in 22 households, and it has one primary school and no healthcare facilities.

The 1961 census recorded Basdeo Khera as comprising 1 hamlet, with a total population of 25 (8 male and 17 female), in 5 households and 5 physical houses. The area of the village was given as 130 acres.
