= Mawai, Ayodhya =

Town in Uttar Pradesh, India

Mawai
- Town
- Location in Uttar Pradesh, India
- Country: India
- State: Uttar Pradesh
- Division: Ayodhya
- District: Ayodhya
- Tehsil: Rudauli
- Block: Mawai

Language
  - Official: Hindi
  - Regional language: Awadhi
- Time zone: UTC+5:30 (IST)
- PIN: 224117
- Vehicle registration: UP-42
- Website: ayodhya.nic.in

Mawai is a town in Rudauli tehsil of Ayodhya district in the Indian state of Uttar Pradesh. It is 58 km west of district headquarters Ayodhya city. Mawai is also a big market of Ayodhya.

Pin code of Mawai is 224117.

== Administration ==
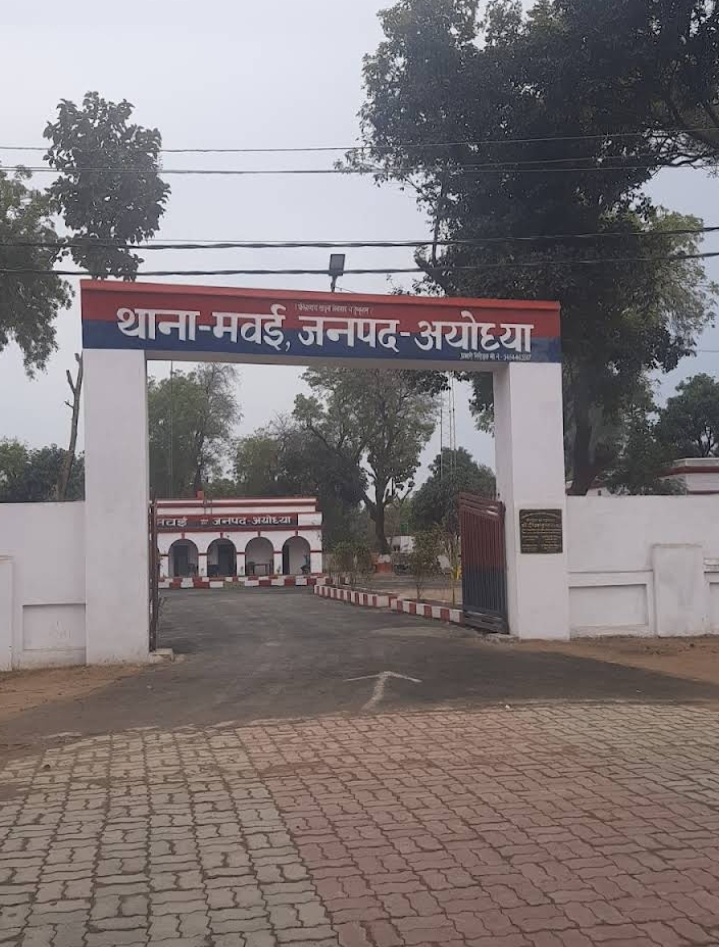
Mawai Police station

There is Police station in Mawai town. Mawai is also a block in Ayodhya district for the development of the villages.
