= Musandi =

Village in Uttar Pradesh, India

Coordinates: 26°32′N 80°56′E

Musandi is a village in the Unnao district, in the Indian state of Uttar Pradesh.

A shrine of famous Sufi saint Hazrat Al-Hajj Sufi Sayed Mohammed Zakaria Shah Hasni urf Sabir Baba, famous as Dargah-e-sabri, is situated at Musandi. Nearby places include Kalukheda, Taisil-Purwa and Hilloli Block. This village is located 35 km from Lucknow city & is 64 km from UNNAO City. Musandi is the largest village in Unnao District, where a Right To Information program was conducted by the Ministry of Information.

== Transport ==
Musandi is 35 km Charbaug Railway Station and 28 km from Lucknow International Airport. Musandi is 54 km away from Unnoa Railway Station and 68 to 80 km from Kanpur Railway Station.
