= Mawai, Jalandhar =

Mawai Mowai
- Village
- Location in Punjab, India Mawai (India)
- Coordinates: 31°03′56″N 75°40′40″E
- Country: India
- State: Punjab
- District: Jalandhar
- Tehsil: Phillaur

Government
  - Type: Panchayat raj
  - Body: Gram panchayat

Area
  - Total: 225 ha (560 acres)

Population (2011)
  - Total: 831; 418/413 ♂/♀
  - Scheduled Castes: 288; 143/145 ♂/♀
  - Total Households: 189

Languages
  - Official: Punjabi
- Time zone: UTC+5:30 (IST)
- Telephone: 01826
- ISO 3166 code: IN-PB
- Vehicle registration: PB-37
- Website: jalandhar.gov.in

Mawai is a village in Phillaur in Jalandhar district of Punjab State, India. It is located 13 kilometres (8.1 mi) from sub district headquarter and 50 kilometres (31 mi) from district headquarter. The village is administrated by Sarpanch an elected representative of the village.

== Demography ==
As of 2011, the village has a total number of 189 houses and a population of 831 of which 418 are males while 413 are females. According to the report published by Census India in 2011, out of the total population of the village 288 people are from Schedule Caste and the village does not have any Schedule Tribe population so far.

== See also ==
- List of villages in India
