= Jera, Unnao =

Jera
- Village
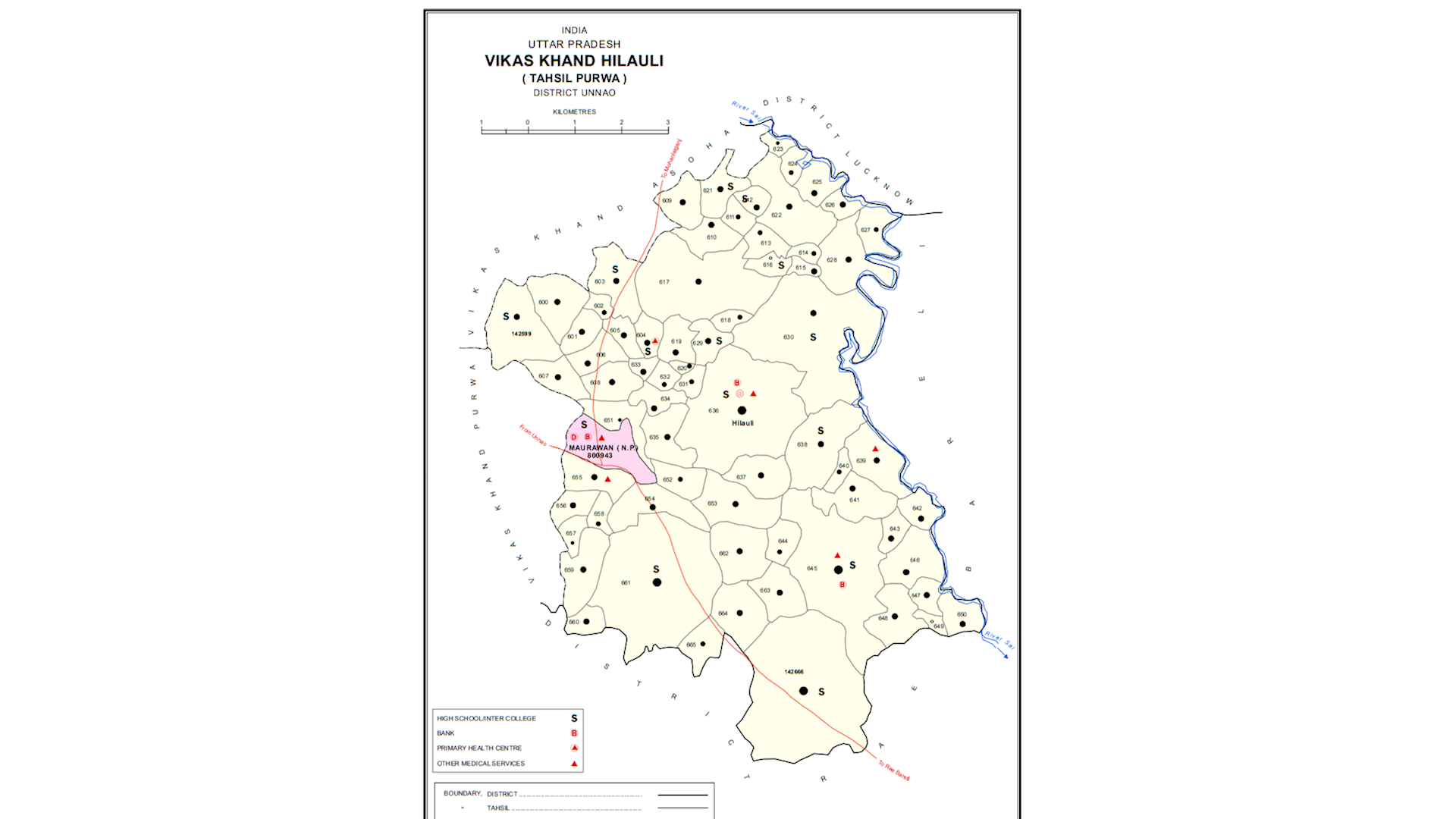
- Map showing Jera (#659) in Hilauli CD block

- Location in Uttar Pradesh, India
- Coordinates: 26.389218°N 80.878217°E
- Country India: India
- State: Uttar Pradesh
- District: Unnao

Area
  - Total: 5.181 km^{2} (2.000 sq mi)

Population (2011)
  - Total: 2,826
  - Density: 545.5/km^{2} (1,413/sq mi)

Languages
  - Official: Hindi
- Time zone: UTC+5:30 (IST)
- Vehicle registration: UP-35

Jera is a village in Hilauli block of Unnao district, Uttar Pradesh, India. As of 2011, its population is 2,826, in 521 households, and it has one primary school and no healthcare facilities.

The 1961 census recorded Jera as comprising 7 hamlets, with a total population of 1,289 (666 male and 623 female), in 240 households and 204 physical houses. The area of the village was given as 1,429 acres.
