= Jera, Prayagraj =

Village in Uttar Pradesh, India

See Jeran for the rune.

Jera is a village in Prayagraj, Uttar Pradesh, India. Jera is a village under Prayagraj, Uttar Pradesh, India . It is almost 60 km away from Prayagraj city. This village has various category of communities There are various persons working in government jobs.
