= Maurawan =

Maurawan Mauranwan
- Town
- Location in Uttar Pradesh, India
- Coordinates: 26.43°N 80.88°E
- Country: India
- State: Uttar Pradesh
- District: Unnao

Government
  - Nagar Panchayat head: Vivek Narayan Seth

Area
  - Total: 4 km^{2} (1.5 sq mi)
- Elevation: 121 m (397 ft)

Population (2011)
  - Total: 15,484
  - Density: 3,900/km^{2} (10,000/sq mi)

Languages
  - Official: Hindi
- Time zone: UTC+5:30 (IST)
- PIN: 209821
- Telephone code: 05142
- Website: maurawan-unnao

Maurawan, also spelled Mauranwan, is a town and nagar panchayat in Purwa tehsil of Unnao district, Uttar Pradesh, India. It is located 12 km from Purwa on the road to Raebareli, and 3 km to the southwest of the town is the large Basaha lake. As of 2011, its population is 15,484, in 2,399 households.

Maurawan hosts a large Dussehra fair on Asvina Sudi 10 each year. Vendors bring wooden products, metal utensils, earthenware pots, cloth, toys, and other items to sell at the fair. The town hosts a market twice per week, on Wednesdays and Saturdays; grain, cloths, and vegetables are the main items sold. The main crops grown here are wheat, barley, gram, juwar, paddy, and pulses, while irrigation is provided mainly by a canal and by lakes.

== History ==
Maurawan is said to have been founded by a Surajbansi Chhatri named Umraj Dhuj. It was historically the seat of a pargana since at least the time of Akbar; the late-16th century Ain-i-Akbari lists it as having a brick fort and being held by the Bais Rajputs.

Maurawan was held as a taluqa beginning in the 1800s by a Seth family descended from one Guran Mal, from Agra who had originally been invited by Rao Mardan Singh of Daundia Khera to act as the banker and accountant for the family estates. (The date when this happened is unclear; Guran Mal had previously been in the service of Saadat Ali Khan I, the Mughal governor of Awadh, but it isn't clear if he remained in this position until Saadat Ali Khan died in 1739 or if he had gone to Daundia Khera before then.) Guran Mal's son, Hirde Ram, later got into a financial dispute with Rao Mardan Singh's successor, Raghunath Singh, over the rate charged for his services. Raghunath Singh refused to pay more than 12%, a rate which Hirde Ram balked at, saying that he charged all other customers 36% and that the 24% rate he was currently charging Raghunath Singh was already a bargain. Hirde Ram became concerned for his safety and left Daundia Khera at night. He settled down outside Maurawan at a place known as Daya Ram's Katra (a name which was no longer in use by the turn of the 20th century) and established himself as not only a banker and moneylender, but also a merchant of cotton, spices, and cloth from Mirzapur. He was later appointed treasurer to the Nazim of Baiswara, a lucrative post which further contributed to his growing wealth and power.

Hirde Ram's grandson Chandan Lal, who took over after Hirde Ram died, was the one who founded the Maurawan taluqa. He is first mentioned in 1810 as the proprietor of three villages in the area, and over the next 40 years he gradually increased his estate. In 1850, however, he got into a dispute with the nazim, and he ended up resigning his position as treasurer in frustration. His estate was then confiscated and given instead to his rival, Rao Ram Bakhsh Singh of Daundia Khera, but Chandan Lal's followers in each village resisted this order and prevented Ram Bakhsh from assuming effective control of the villages. Chandan Lal sought the intervention of the King of Awadh and persuaded him to order the nazim to restore Chandan Lal's property to him. In the end, Chandan Lal was only dispossessed for two and a half months. He died in 1854 at the age of 82.

Chandan Lal's favourite son, Gauri Shankar, had already taken over much of his father's responsibilities before his death. He found favour with the Brisith after siding with them during the Indian Rebellion of 1857, and he was later promoted to the title of Raja. The taluqa was divided into 8 different estates during his lifetime after the death of his brother Kanhaiya Lal.

At the turn of the 20th century, Maurawan was described as "a large country town", surrounded by groves of mahua and mango trees and with two mosques and nine Hindu temples. The town was noted for its jewellery and carpentry and had a police station, a sarai, a dispensary, and two schools.

Maurawan was declassified as a town during the 1961 census due to non-fulfilment of urban conditions, although part of it was still administered as a town area. Accordingly, the 1961 census listed statistics for two separate entities: Maurawan and Maurawan Town Area. The total population of Maurawan was 7,117 people: 6,498 in Maurawan Town Area and 619 in Maurawan (non-Town Area). The Town Area had a population of 3,533 males and 2,965 females, in 1,030 households and 919 physical houses; the non-Town Area had a population of 336 males and 313 females, in 105 households and 96 physical houses. The Town Area covered an area of 2,890 acres, while the non-Town Area's area was not given due to being "partly included in the rural Town Area Maurawan". At that time, the town of Maurawan had a police force of 2 sub-inspectors, 1 head constable, and 14 constables; it had two government-run dispensaries as well. K.N.P.N. Inter College in Maurawan, founded in 1898, had a faculty of 21 teachers (all male) and a student body of 520 (also all male) in 1961. Average attendance of the Dussehra festival was 10,000 people, and average attendance of the twice-weekly market was 1,000. Maurawan had the following small industrial establishments at the time: 1 grain mill, 2 places producing edible fats and/or oils, 13 miscellaneous food processing facilities, 1 manufacturer of (non-chewing) tobacco products, 10 garment makers, 1 tannery, 18 bicycle repair shops, 1 place assembling and/or repairing watches and/or clocks, 6 manufacturers of jewellery or precious metal items, and 6 makers and/or repairers of other goods.

During Maurawan's classification as a village, it was administered as part of the community development block of Hilauli, and it was also part of the Hilauli nyaya panchayat. Maurawan was reclassified as a town for the 1981 census.

== Geography ==
Maurawan is located at 26.43°N 80.88°E. It has an average elevation of 121 metres (397 ft). Maurawan is 55 kilometres (34 mi) from Lucknow, 42 kilometres (26 mi) from Unnao, 45 kilometres (28 mi) from Rai Baraily and 62 kilometres (39 mi) from Kanpur. The nearest airport is Lucknow.

The mosques [Jama Masjid] [Firdausi Masjid] and temples of the Goddess [Durga] [Vankhandi Devi] are venerated places in the area around Maurawan. People from surrounding areas and residents of the other districts also come to visit these sacred places in Maurawan to offer their prayers.

== Demographics ==
Historical population
Year	Pop.	±%
1921	6,221	—
1931	7,381	+18.6%
1941	7,622	+3.3%
1951	7,108	−6.7%
1961	Not given	—
1971	Not given	—
1981	10,372	—
1991	12,101	+16.7%
2001	14,063	+16.2%
2011	15,484	+10.1%
Source: 2011 Census of India

According to the 2011 census, Maurawan has a population of 15,484 people, in 2,399 households. The town's sex ratio is 916 females to every 1000 males; 8,081 of Maurawan's residents are male (52.2%) and 7,403 are female (47.8%). The 0-6 age group makes up about 12.7% of the town's population; among this group, the sex ratio is 918, which is higher than the district urban average of 903. Members of Scheduled Castes make up 12.37% of the town's population and members of Scheduled Tribes make up 0.57%. The town's literacy rate was 68.8% (counting only people age 7 and up); literacy was higher among men and boys (73.2%) than among women and girls (64.1%). The scheduled castes literacy rate is 62.3% (71.3% among men and boys, and 52.6% among women and girls).

In terms of employment, 19.9% of Maurawan residents were classified as main workers (i.e. people employed for at least 6 months per year) in 2011. Marginal workers (i.e. people employed for less than 6 months per year) made up 9.1%, and the remaining 71.1% were non-workers. Employment status varied heavily according to gender, with 48.0% of men being either main or marginal workers, compared to only 8.2% of women.

14.2% of Maurawan residents live in slum conditions as of 2011. There are 4 slum areas in Maurawan: Shivpura/Bakhri/D... (name cut off), Chamaran Tola, Kazigarhi East, and Beniganj (the largest). These range in size from about 80 to 100 households and have between 6 and 8 tap water access points. The number of flush toilets installed in people's homes ranges from 0 in Beniganj to 32 in Shivpura/Bakhri/D...; Beniganj also has 5 households using pit-system toilets. All 4 areas are serviced by open sewers.
