= Qom =

City in Qom province, Iran

Qom قم
- City
- کلانشهر قم · Qom Metropolis
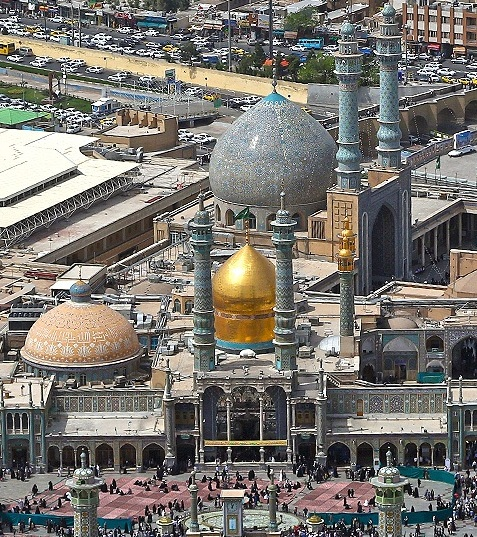
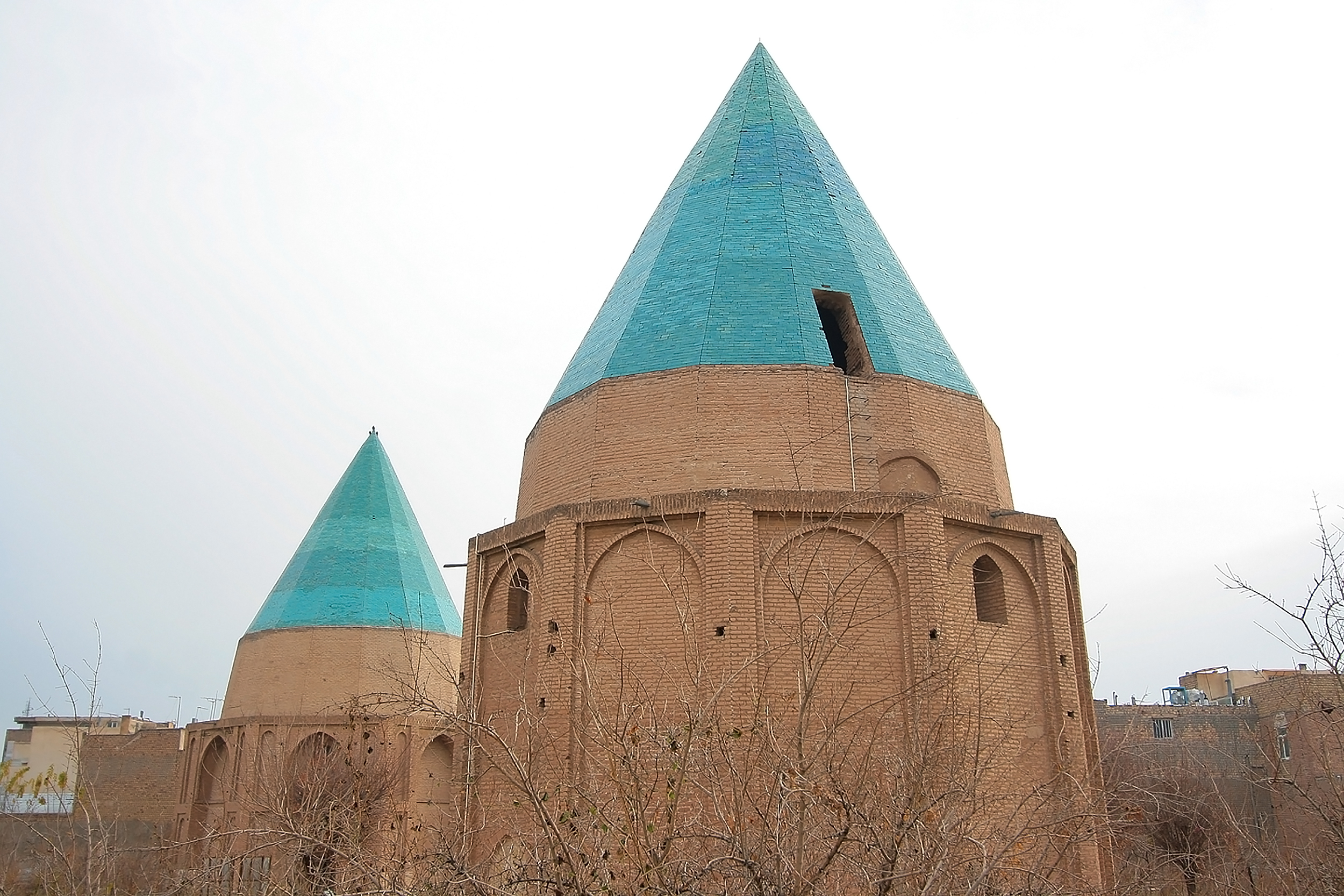
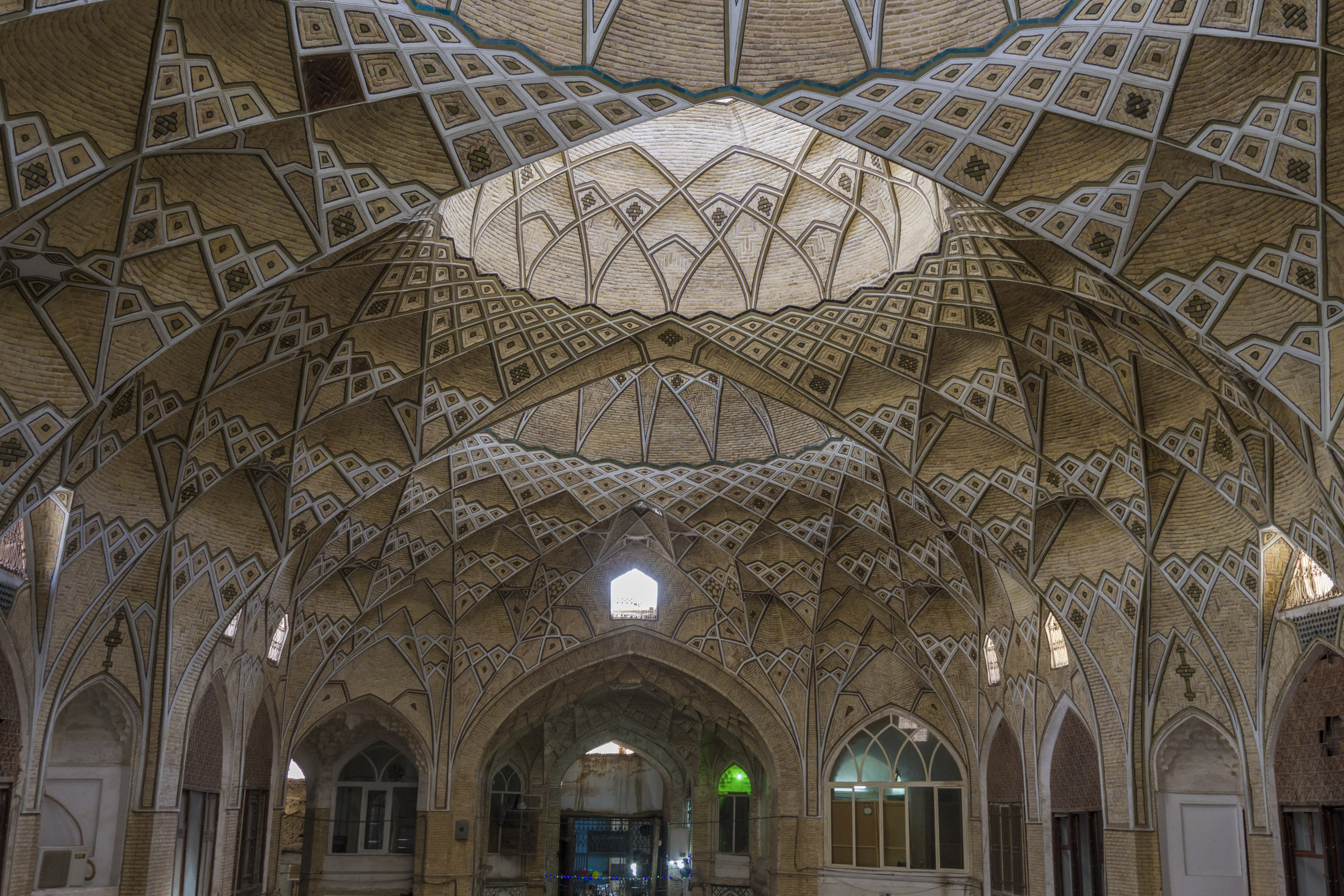
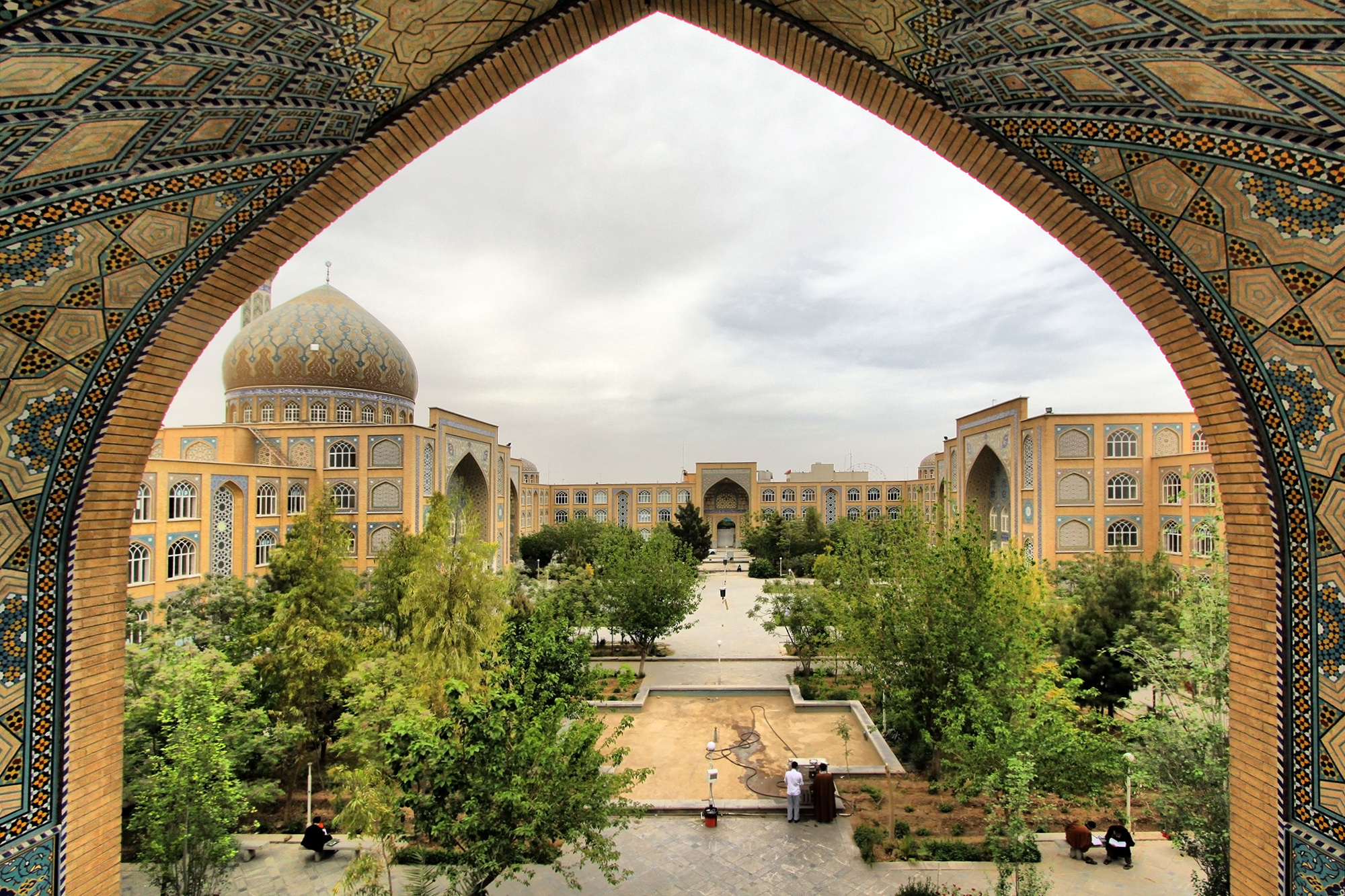
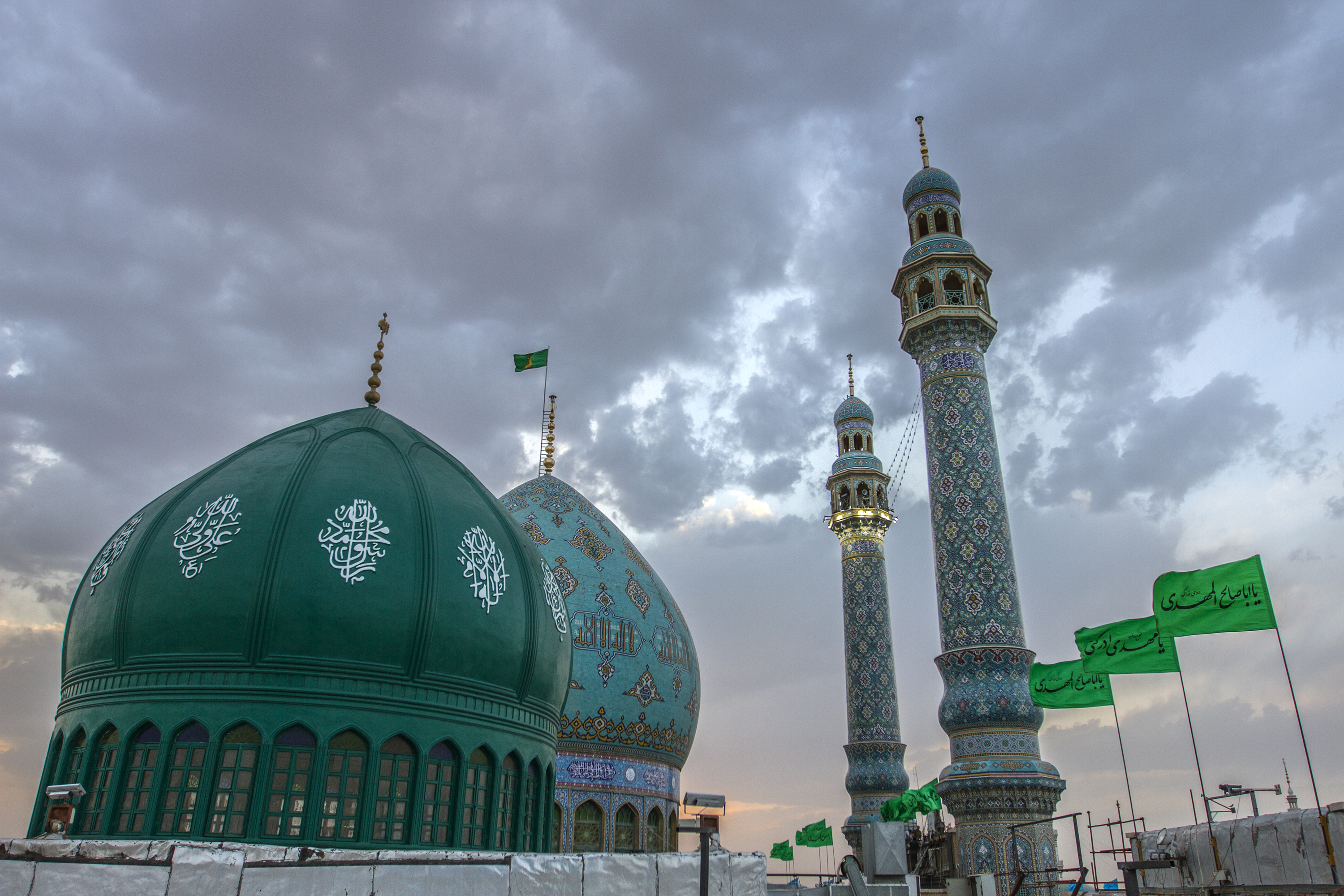
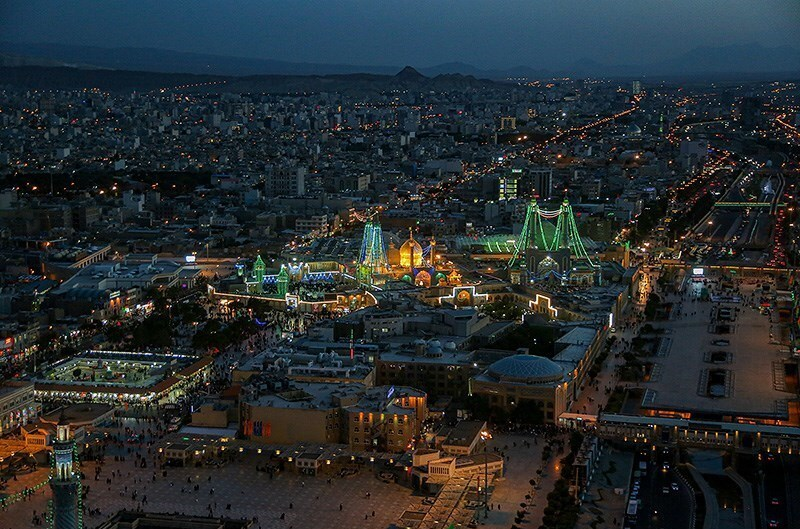
- Top: Fatima Masumeh Shrine, Second Row: Left: Bagh-e Gonbad-e Sabz Right: Grand Timcheh of Qom, Third Row: Left: Feyziyeh Madrasas Right: Jamkaran Mosque, Bottom: Panoramic view of downtown Qom

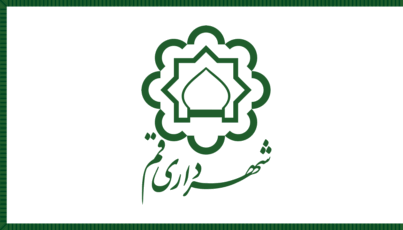
- Flag

- Location within Iran
- Coordinates: 34°38′24″N 50°52′35″E
- Country: Iran
- Province: Qom
- County: Qom
- District: Central

Government
  - Mayor: Faramarz Azimi
- Elevation: 936 m (3,071 ft)

Population (2016)
  - City: 1,201,158
  - Metro: 1,260,000
  - Population Rank in Iran: 7th
- Time zone: UTC+3:30 (IRST)
- Postal code: 37100
- Area code: (+98) 025
- Climate: BWh
- Website: qom.ir

Qom (Note: Also known as Ghom, Ghum, or Qum) (Persian: قم; [qom]) is the capital of Qom province, Iran. It is also the capital of Qom County and its Central District. It is the seventh largest metropolis and the seventh largest city in Iran. The city is 140 km (87 mi) to the south of Tehran, on the banks of the Qom River. Qom is a holy city in Shia Islam, as it is the site of the Fatima Masumeh Shrine, a descendant of the Islamic prophet Muhammad. She was the granddaughter of Ja'far al-Sadiq, the daughter of Musa al-Kazim, the sister of Ali al-Rida, and the aunt of Muhammad al-Jawad, the sixth, seventh, eighth and ninth of the Twelve Imams. The city is the world's largest center for Shia Islamic scholarship and is a significant destination of pilgrimage, with around 20 million pilgrims visiting every year. Qom's economy is heavily dependent on pilgrimage, and the city is the most conservative in Iran.

Qom is also home to Jamkaran Mosque, another holy site in Shia Islam where every year, millions celebrate Mid-Sha'ban, marking the birth of Muhammad al-Mahdi. The city has developed into a lively industrial center owing, in part, to its proximity to Tehran. It is a regional center for the distribution of petroleum and petroleum products, and a natural gas pipeline from Bandar Anzali and Tehran and a crude oil pipeline from Tehran run through Qom to the Abadan refinery on the Persian Gulf. Qom gained additional prosperity when oil was discovered at Sarajeh (fa:میدان نفتی البرز قم) near the city in 1956 and a large refinery was built between Qom and Tehran. In between the Tehran-Qom highway is the Imam Khomeini International Airport, the largest airport in Iran.

== Etymology ==
The precise origin of the name is unclear. There are multiple theories:

- Some researchers consider the old name of Qom to be Komiran. The first element would reflect the word kom 'city', while the second element would be shared by Shemiran (near Tehran), Tehran, Chamran (in Saveh areas), and Iran. The full name would then be equivalent to 'Iran city'.
- According to the 10th-century book Tarikh-i Qum (literally 'History of Qom'), the name of the city comes from the word koomeh (Persian: کومه), which literally means 'hut'. On this view, the name referred to the basic dwelling of the local shepherds and farmers, who made their houses out of much reed that grew around the ford of Qom River.

== History ==
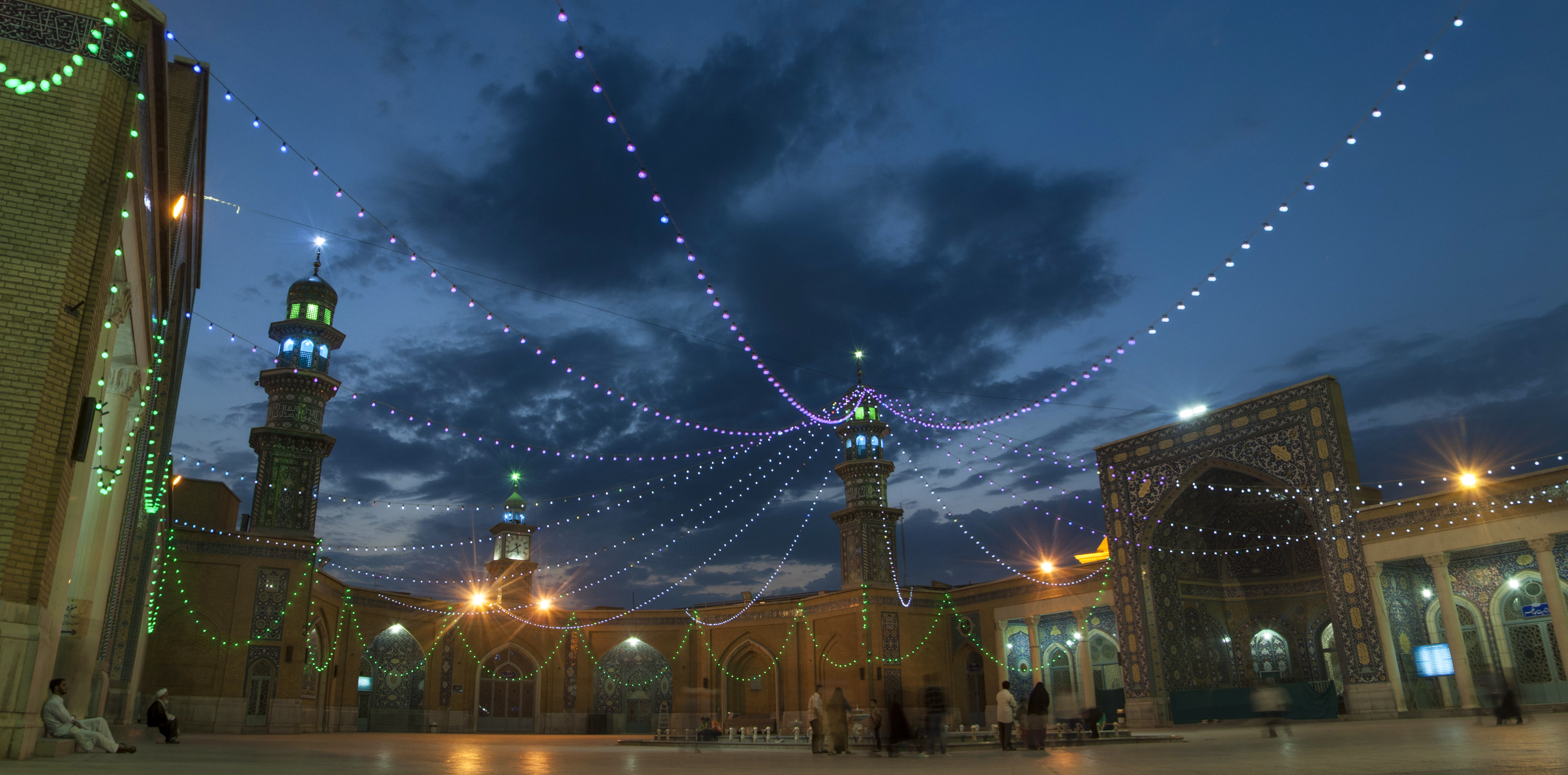
Azam Mosque in Qom

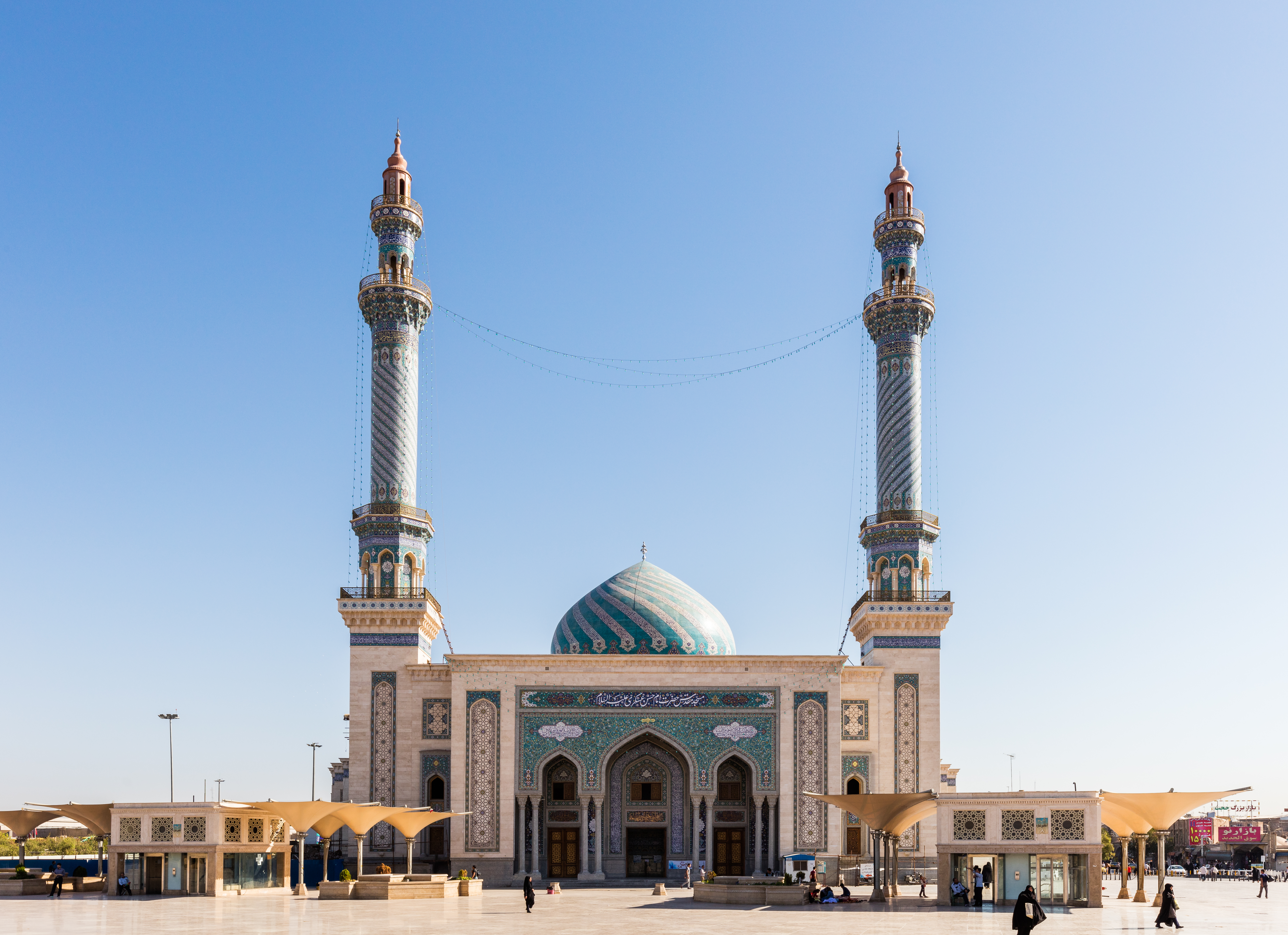
Imam Hasan al-Askari Mosque

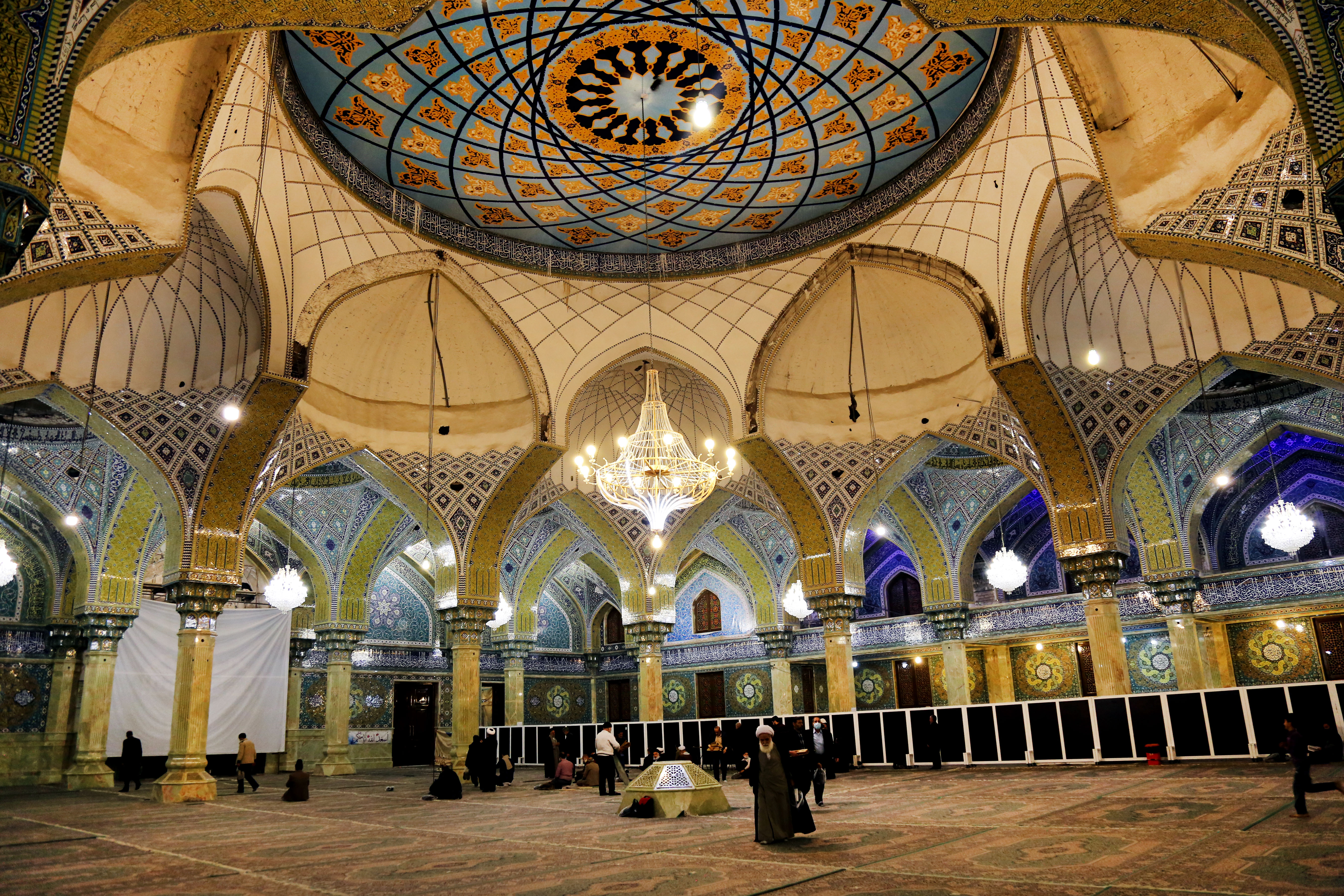
Imam Hasan Askari Mosque, Qom, Iran

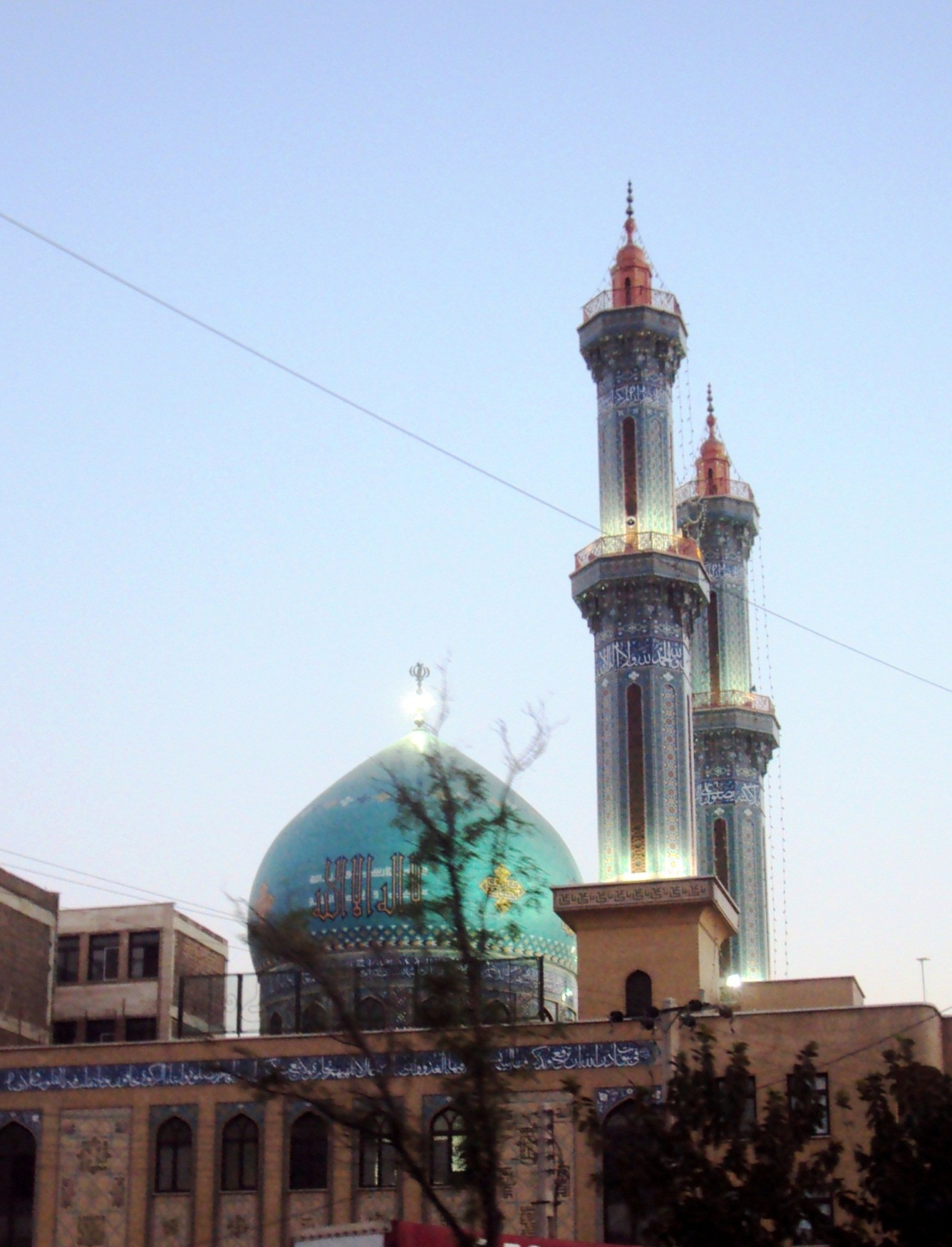
Al-Ghadir Mosque

The present city of Qom in Central Iran dates back to ancient times. Its pre-Islamic history can be partially documented, although the earlier epochs remain unclear. Excavations at Tepe Sialk indicate that the region had been settled since ancient times (Ghirshman and Vanden Berghe), and more recent surveys have revealed traces of large, inhabited places south of Qom, dating from the 4th and 1st millennium BC.

In antiquity, the Qom region was a stronghold of the cult of Anahita, the Iranian goddess of fertility. André Godard has reported about an Anahita temple along the Qom River (Golshan River). A district called Taraznahid (Nahid is her Persian name), close to Qom, is also connected to the goddess.

While nothing is known about the area from Elamite, Medes, and Achaemenid times, there are significant archeological remains from the Seleucid and Parthian epochs, of which the ruins of Khurha (about 70 kilometres or 43 miles southwest of Qom) are the most famous and important remnants. Their dating and function have instigated long and controversial debates and interpretations, for they have been interpreted and explained variously as the remains of a Sasanian temple, or of a Seleucid Dionysian temple, or of a Parthian complex. Its true function is still a matter of dispute, but the contributions by Wolfram Kleiss point to a Parthian palace that served as a station on the nearby highway and was used until Sasanian times.

The recently published results of the excavations carried out in 1955 by Iranian archeologists have revived the old thesis of a Seleucid religious building. Besides Khurha, which is already mentioned as Khor Abad at Qomi in the 9th century, the region has turned up a few other remnants from this epoch, including the four Parthian heads found near Qom, now kept in the National Museum of Iran in Tehran. Qomi names Parthian personalities as founders of villages in the Qom area. The possible mention of Qom in the form of Greek names in two ancient geographical works (the Tabula Peutingera and Ptolemy's geographical tables) remains doubtful.

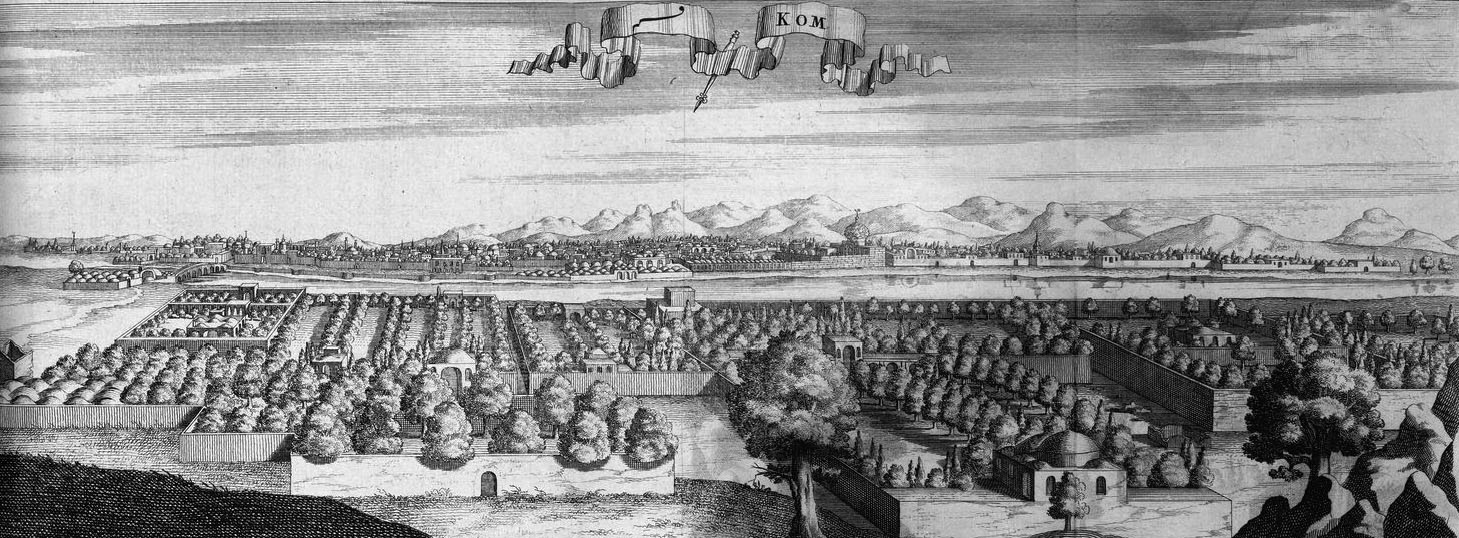
Qom city in a 1723 AD painting

The Sasanian epoch offers many archeological findings and remnants, besides the fact that various sources mention Qom. The most interesting building from an archeological point of view is the Qalʿa-ye Doḵtar in Qom itself, which was long thought to have served religious purposes, while more recent research points to an administrative use. The wider surroundings of Qom also contain numerous traces from palaces, religious, military and administrative buildings. Some of these are mentioned by Qomi, who also names many more fire temples in the urban area of present Qom and its region, of which no archeological traces are left although the location of one fire temple can probably be equated with today's Masjed-e Emām in the city. According to Qomi, the most important fire temple of the area stood in the nearby village of Dizijan.

Tāriḵ-e Qom and some other sources also speak of genuine historical figures of the Sasanian epoch in connection with Qom and its region. They shed new light on the time of the seizure of power by the first Sasanian king Ardashir I, who fought his decisive battles near Qom, and the collapse of the Sasanian empire, which is extensively reported by Ebn Aʿṯam Kufi and the Nehāyat al-Erab and names a certain Šērzād as the satrap of the region. The existence of an urban settlement in the Sasanian epoch is furthermore verified by Middle Persian sources, literary sources, inscriptions, and seals, that mention in the time of Shapur I and Kawād I the names Godmān/Gomān and Ērān Win(n)ārd Kawād, both of which could be identified as Qom.

Qom likely functioned as a small administrative unit throughout the whole Sasanian era. Probably the urban structure of the Sasanian settlement of Qom can be compared with the type of city of Ctesiphon (Or. Madāʾen) and consisted of several villages and little towns with Abaraštejān, Mamajjān and Jamkarān as the bigger settlements that were loosely connected by defense installations.

It is difficult to decipher the actual process of the Arab conquest of Qom from the extant Arabic sources. According to Balāḏori, the first tentative conquest of Qom took place in 23/644 by Abu Musa Ashaari after a few days of fighting, although Abu Musa's route through Western Persia, as narrated by Balāḏori, appears somewhat confusing. It remains unclear who the defenders of Qom were. Probably fleeing Sasanian nobles and local soldiers returning from the great battles against the Arabs formed the core of the resistance. The area remained largely untouched for 60 years after the initial conquest and was probably administered from Isfahan.

The first permanent settlement of Arab settlers in Qom took place during the revolts of Mukhtar al-Thaqafi and Moṭarref b. Moḡira b. Šaʿba in 66–77/685–96, when small groups of refugees moved there and Qom itself was affected by the fighting between the Umayyad state power and the rebels. The decisive step for the later urban development of Qom occurred when a group of Ashaari Arabs came to the area. These Ashaaries originated in Yemen and the first important figure among them was the first conqueror of the area of Qom, the above-mentioned Abu Musa Ashaari. ʿAbd-Allāh b. Saʿd and Aḥwaṣ b. Saʿd were grandsons of Abi Musa's nephew and led the group of Ashaaries that emigrated from Kufa to the region of Qom. It is not exactly clear why they migrated, but it might have also been a general opposition to the Umayyad dynasty. A central element was the early contact with the leading local Zoroastrian Persian noble Yazdanfadar.

As the Arabs required a great deal of pasture for their large herds of cattle and were much wealthier than the local Persians, they slowly started to buy land and take over more villages. The decisive step for controlling the area was the elimination of the local Persian noble class that took place after the death of Yazdanfadar in 733. Although a few names of governors and their tax assessments are known from the time after the administrative independence, the death of Fātimah bint Mūsā, the sister of the eighth Imam of Shias Ali al-Ridha in the city in 201/816–17 proved to be of great importance for the later history of Qom. Fātimah bint Mūsā died while following her brother to Khorasan, a region in northern Iran. The place of her entombment developed from 869–70 into a building that was transformed over time into today's magnificent and economically important sanctuary.

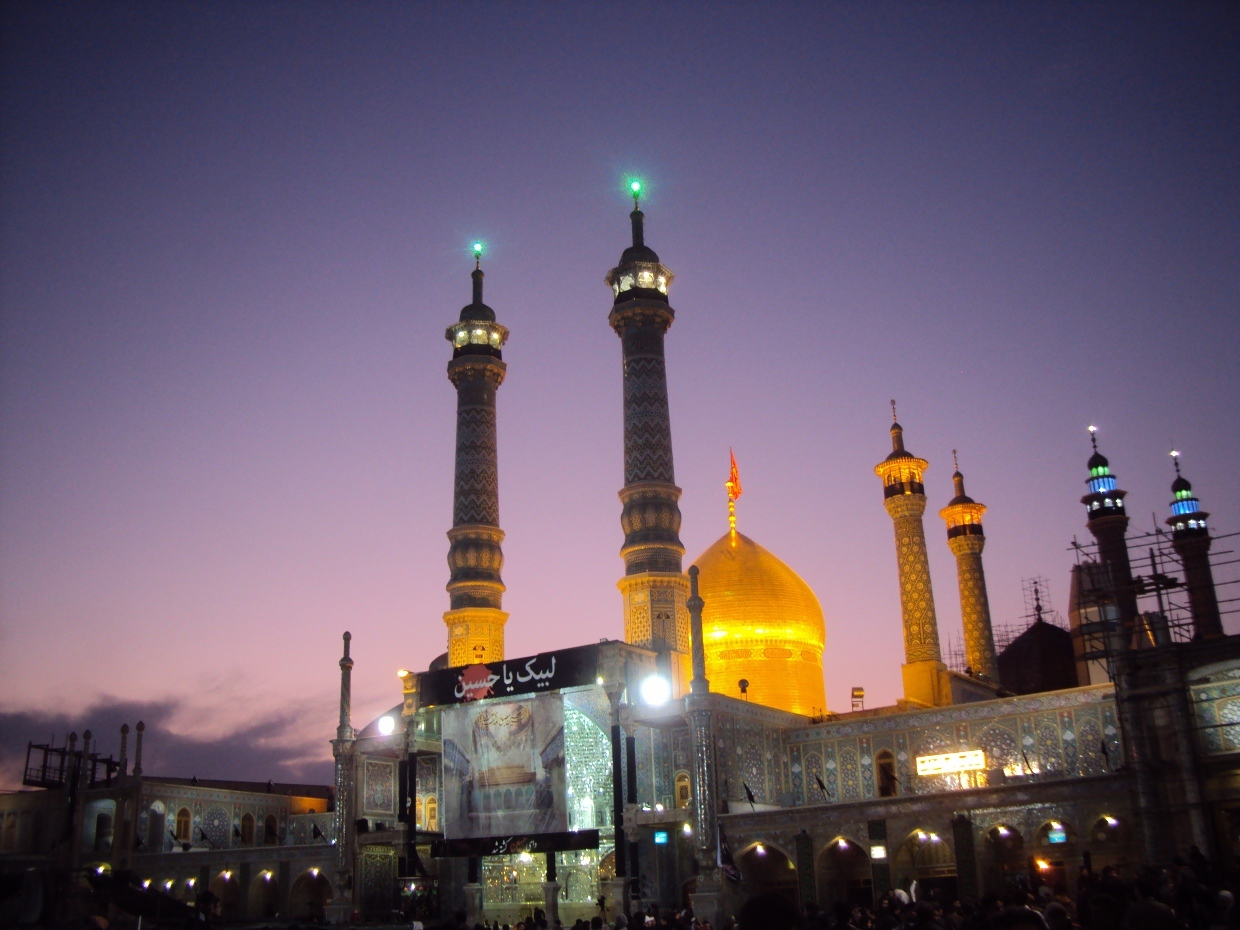
The Fatima Masumeh Shrine in Qom

In 825–26, a major rebellion against the tax regulations of the caliphate broke out in Qom. It was caused by the refusal of the caliph Al-Ma'mun to lower the yearly tax assessment as he had done in Ray. The revolt was led by an Ashaari named Yahya ibn Emran, maintaining that taxes should not be paid to an unlawful ruler. Yahya was killed by troops sent by the caliph and the citizens were severely punished; the taxes were raised from 2 million to 7 million dirhams. Two years later the taxes were again raised by 700,000 dirham by the Ashaari governor Ali ibn Isa, who was subsequently deposed because he was strongly rejected by the inhabitants of Qom. But in 833 Ali returned to the post of governor (wali) and forcefully collected tax debts that were laid upon him by the caliph. He destroyed parts of Qom and handed over a wanted rebel to caliphal authorities under Al-Moʿtasem. Between 839–42 two contradicting tax assessments were carried out under turbulent circumstances which amounted to a sum of 5 million dirhams. The names of those involved have survived.

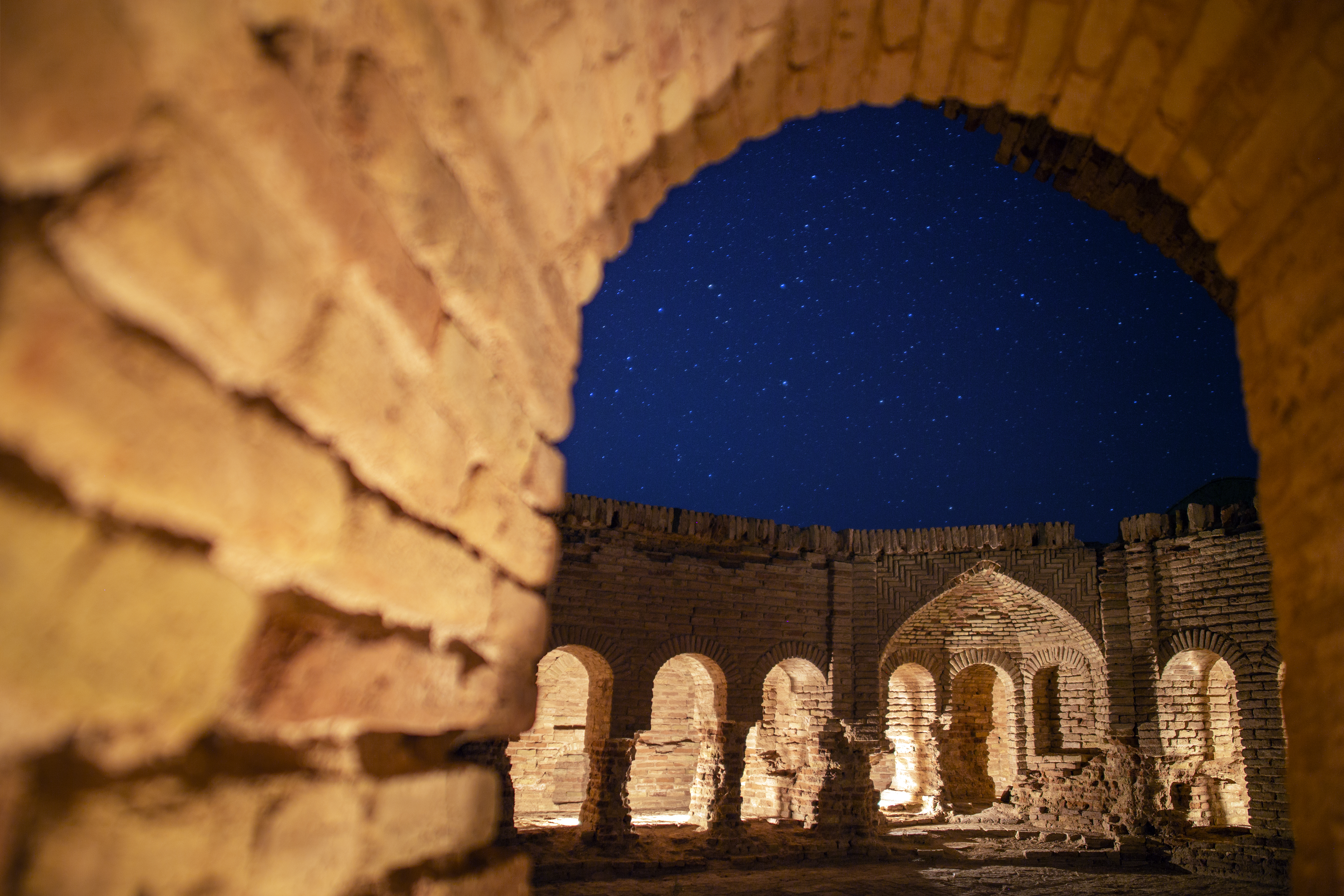
Deire Gachin Caravansarai

The move of a Hadith transmitter from Kufa to Qom, which took place probably in the middle of the 9th century, indicates the increased importance of Qom as a center of Shia learning. At about the same time another military attack on the city occurred in 254/868, when Mofleḥ, the Turkish officer of the caliph Al-Mostaʿin, executed some of its inhabitants because of the city's refusal to pay taxes. Mofleḥ became governor of Qom and lasted in that position for at least five years. During his governorship important Alids moved to Qom and there are references to close contacts between the representative of the 11th Shia's Imam, Hassan al-Askari, in Qom and other Qomis. The representative Ahmad b. Eshaq was at the same time administrator of the Fāṭema sanctuary and the agent (wakil) responsible for the pensions of the Alids.

The first Friday mosque in Qom was built in 878–79 on the site of a fire temple, although there are also confusing reports concerning a possible earlier Friday mosque. In 881–82 Qom was occupied by the Turkish military leader Edgu Tegin (Arabic: Yadkutakin b. Asātakin or Aḏkutakin), who tried to collect the tax arrears for seven years which partially ruined the guarantors (some of whom are known) of these taxes. At about the same time the early orthodox Shias achieved their victory in the town. In 893–94, at the latest, all extremists (ḡolāt) were driven out of town by the leading Shia shaikh of Qom, Ahmaad b. Mohamed Isa Azhari. Probably one year later, in 1895, the famous Islamic mystic Ḥosayn b. Manṣur Ḥallaj stayed in Qom, where he was arrested.

From 895–96 onwards the history of Qom was connected with a family of Turkish military leaders from the army of the caliph Al-Mu'tadid, including the governor Berun (Birun). In the same year, Berun destroyed a big and probably still active fire temple located on the territory of the evolving city and probably opposite today's sanctuary of Fātimah bint Mūsā. In these unstable political times, Qom was visited by the vizier of Al-Moʿtazed, Obayd-Allah ibn Solayman, and two tax assessments were organized.

An administrative peculiarity of Qom was put to an end at about the same time, to wit the independent appointment of judges through the Arab inhabitants of Qom until the time of al-Moktafi, which, together with the dispatch of a joint Arab-Persian delegation to the vizier Ḥamid ibn Abbas indicate the end of the elevated position of the Arabs in Qom. The period of the governor Abbas ibn Amr Ganawi (292–96/904–09) is remarkable for the presence of non-Twelver Shias in Qom and the establishment of the office of the jahbaḏ (financial officer) as the tax broker for the city, which fostered local self-determination.

In 909 Hosayn ibn Hamdan ibn Hamdun was appointed governor of Qom and Kāšān by the caliph Al-Moqtader and had to assist the caliph's army against the Saffarids in Fars. Altogether he stayed in power only for two years before he had to return to Baghdad. In the years 301/913–14 to 315/927, the people of Qom had, besides another tax assessment (meanwhile the eighth), a caliphal intervention that resulted in the appointment of a governor to stabilize the administrative grip over the region. This move caused more unrest and affected the balance of power in an area that was disputed between the powers of the time (Daylamites, Samanids).

Beginning in 316/928 Qom fell into the sphere of interest of Daylami warlords and was relieved from the direct authority of the caliph, although it changed hands several times between 928 and 943. The Daylamites brutally exploited the city through harsh taxes. With the firm establishment of Buyids control from 340/951–52 on, the political circumstances were less troubled than before, although the economic situation deteriorated.

No outstanding events are reported for the relatively stable political period until 988–89, but Qom seems to have been isolated inside Persia because of its Shia creed. At the same time, the Fatima sanctuary was enlarged and the number of sayyeds residing in Qom reached a considerable number. In 373/984, Qom and its environs were impacted by the revolt of the Kurdish Moḥammad Barzikāni against the Buyid Fakr-Al-Dawla.

The population amounted to 50,000 inhabitants at the most and consisted of Persians and Arabs who had adopted the Persian of the time as their language and many social customs from the Persians, whose proportion was probably smaller than the Arabs. The Kurds lived in the countryside to the west. The Twelver Shia constituted the great majority of the population and many important Shia scholars of the time came from Qom or lived there. As many as 331 male Alids lived in Qom in 988–89, and they produced a good number of community leaders and there is also mention of one prominent female ʿAlid besides Fātimah bint Mūsā. These Alids descended from the Imams and were supported by pensions.

Apart from the Shia mainstream, other Shia sects existed in the city and one can also assume the presence of Sunnies. Ḏemmis, or followers of other revealed religions (Jews, Christians, and Zoroastrians) must have lived in the city, too, as the payment of poll tax (jezya) indicates, although their number can only be very roughly estimated at a few thousand at the end of the 9th century and must have shrunk drastically in the 10th century. The majority of these non-Muslims were Zoroastrians, who made their living mostly as farmers. Jews must have lived in Qom as well, but information on them is scant. It is striking that the formerly dominant Ashaaries had lost their leading positions by the end of the 10th century. This points at a new social situation that allowed assimilated Persians to join the local establishment.

The city's topography in the 10th century still reflected the evolutionary merging of the original six villages; these were still separated by fields. The town center was located in the village of Mamajjān, which was connected to other parts of the city on the other side of the river by four bridges. There were about eight squares whose function is not clear and three mosques within the city. There is almost no information about madrasas. The sanctuary must have still been quite small as only two cupolas are mentioned. A bazaar and bathhouses must have existed, too, as well as certain administrative buildings (prison, mint). Five bigger and eight smaller roads indicate good traffic connections, which were supported by at least three or maybe even nine city gates.

Qom was then in a difficult economic and social position. Many houses inside the city as well as bridges and mills were ruined, and the roads and agriculture were suffering from an insecure situation. This has to be attributed to difficult social circumstances and excessive taxation. The water supply seems to have been satisfactory and the Ashaaries seem to have undertaken continuous renovation works on the irrigation channels between 733 and 900. The Ašʿaris were also the proprietors of the water rights, which were safeguarded in the water authority (divān-e āb) that regulated the water shares.

The system made the Ašʿaris the wealthiest inhabitants of Qom and stayed in place until 347/958–59 when they were expropriated by the Buyids, which brought about a decline in the whole system of irrigation. Although there were attempts at restoration in 371/981–82, only three of originally twenty-one channels had flowing water which meant enough drinking water was supplied for the population, but the available amount could not have been adequate for agricultural purposes.

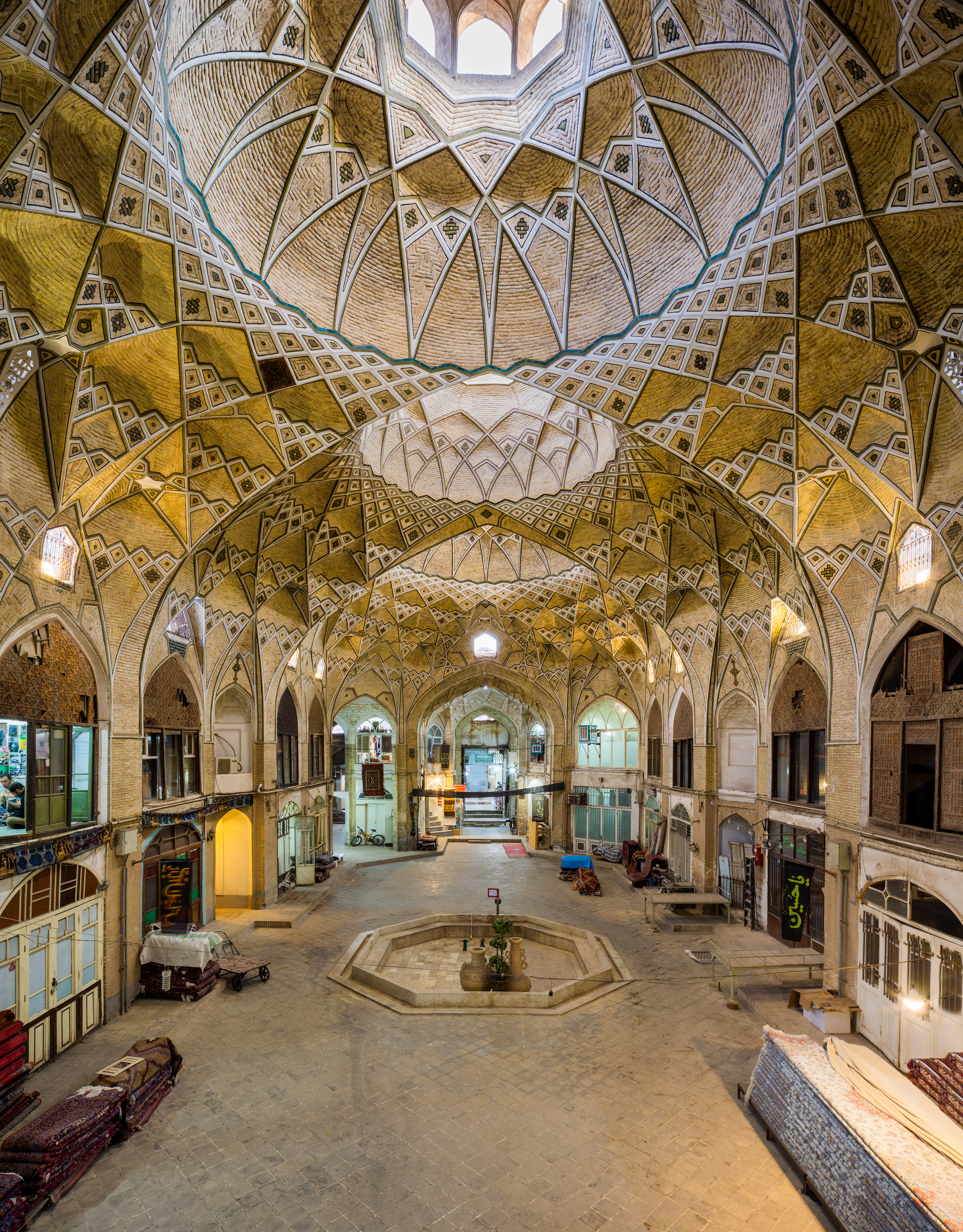
Grand Timcheh.

Altogether the state of cultivation in Qom seems to have resembled that of the other regions of Persia, although the thirty different crops and plants are only indirectly mentioned in connection with the tax assessments. The soil is reported to have good quality and produced big quantities of food. Little is known about animal husbandry in the region, but the considerable number of fifty-one mills existed, of which a fifth was in decay. Legends speak of mineral deposits and mines of silver, iron, gold and lead, while Kurds seem to have produced salt from a lake nearby (see Qom Lake). The production of chairs, textiles, and saddle equipment indicates craftsmanship.

The city's taxation has to be distinguished between the more proper rule of the Abbasid tax bureaucracy and the time of the Deylamid warlords where rules were bent arbitrarily. A stunning diversity of taxes is known (often meant to serve the Abbasid bureaucracy and the Deylamid and Buyid war machinery) but the Karaj (land tax), which was composed of many different separate sums, was the most important single tax existing in Qom at least since post-Sasanian times. Within the known 18 tax figures ranging over 160 years there are great differences and the tax figures vary from 8 million to 2 million dirhams with a mean value at around 3 million.

In taxation, Qom always followed the solar calendar with its own local variation, starting from the death of the Sasanian Yazdegerd III. A highly differentiated tax administration existed and is known in great detail; 24 tax collectors (ʿommāl) are listed from 189/804–05 to 371/981–82 plus two jahabaḏa who acted as mediators after the attempt to enforce collective responsibility by the taxpayers had failed. The information in the Tāriḵ-e Qom on taxation also mention by name 21 tax districts (rasātiq) in the region with 900 villages.

Little is known about the time until the period of Seljuki dominance. In 387/997, Qom became involved in internal Buyid quarrels and was subsequently unsuccessfully besieged. In 418/1027–28, Qom fell under the rule of Šahryuš from the Kakuyid dynasty and a few years later (1030–40) it became part of the Ghaznavid domain. The Seljuki did not occupy Qom at once but left the town and Jebāl in Kakuyid hands for ten years. From 442/1050–51 on, the city was under Seljuk rule and nothing is known about its fate until 487/1094. Afterwards the growing instability of the Seljuk empire involved Qom in the power struggles between the competing Seljuk factions in Jebāl and the city changed hands many times. The most stable period seems to have been the 14 years (513–27/1119–33) when Qom lay in Sanjar's sphere of power and witnessed the construction of a second Friday mosque.

Qom enjoyed relative prosperity in its economy in the Seljuk period. The rigidly Sunni Seljuks seem to have practiced a pragmatic policy and one of the main sources of this time (ʿAbd-al-Jalil Qazvini) speaks of good relations between the famous vizier Nizam al-Mulk and Seljuk sultans on the one hand, and members of the local nobility on the other. Sultans reportedly visited the sanctuary (although no specific sultan is mentioned by name) and in general no religiously motivated punitive action against Qom is known to have taken place. Under Seljuk rule a considerable number of religious buildings were erected. At least ten madrasas are known by name. Two Friday mosques seem to have existed in Seljuk times: the old one was renovated and a new one, located outside of the town area, was built in 528/1133–34 by the order of Sultan Togrel II (Persian: سلطان طغرل دوم). Qom must have expanded during this period, but precise reasons for its prosperity are not known. A family of Ḥosaynid Alids was influential and provided a number of community leaders. Another important Shia family was that of the Daʿwidār (Persian: دعوی‌دار), whose members were judges (Arabic: قاضی) in town, which indicates the transformation of Qom from a town governed by the Sunnis to a completely Shia domain.

The following epochs of the Eldiguzids and Khawrazmshahs lasted for almost 30 years and brought different systems of rule in quick succession. The two noteworthy events of this period are the execution of ʿEzz-al-Din Yaḥyā, the naqib of the Shias, by the Tekesh in 592/1196 and the work on the tiles of the sanctuary (probably in 605–13/1208–17), which indicate a certain economic prosperity at a time of unstable political conditions. From 614/1217–18 until the Mongol attack, Qom remained under Muhammad II of Khwarezm.

The Mongol invasion led to the total destruction of Qom by the armies of the Mongol generals, Jebe and Sübedei, in 621/1224 and left the city in ruins for at least twenty years, when the sources (Jovayni) tell of the levying of taxes. Twenty years later, reconstruction and repair works, probably sponsored by some wealthy inhabitants, were being done on the mausoleums of Shia saints in the city, which contradict those sources, such as Ḥamd-Allāh Mostawfi, that describe Qom as a ruined and depopulated city throughout the Ilkhanid period. Besides, the fact that the Ilkhanid vizier Šams-al-Din Jovayni took refuge in the Fātimah bint Mūsā sanctuary in 683/1284, indicates that the city must have experienced at least a modest comeback. The city walls were probably rebuilt and four graves of saints are known to have been constructed between 720/1301 and 1365. Some fine tiles are known from this period. Nothing is known about the irrigation systems of the town, but nearby a dam was built in the Ilkhanid period and the local administration must have functioned again, as the name of a judge shows. The agricultural situation is described as flourishing with a variety of cultivated plants and a good supply of water, and legends indicate the use of deposits of mineral resources. Information exists concerning taxes for the post-Mongolian period. Qom paid 40,000 dinars, but more remarkable is the fact that some of the surrounding rural districts paid as much as Qom or even more, which suggests that the whole administrative structure of districts had also changed.

In the late 14th century, the city was plundered by Tamerlane and the inhabitants were massacred. Qom gained special attention and gradually developed due to its religious shrine during the Saffavid dynasty. By 1503, Qom became one of the important centers of theology in relation to Shia Islam and became a significant religious pilgrimage site and pivot. The city suffered heavy damage again during the Afghan invasions, resulting in consequent severe economic hardships.

Qom further sustained damage during the reign of Nader Shah and the conflicts between the two households of Zandieh and Qajariyeh in order to gain power over Iran. In 1793, Qom came under the control of Agha Muhammad Khan Qajar. On being victorious over his enemies, the Qajar Sultan Fath Ali Shah was responsible for the repairs done on the sepulchre and Holy Shrine of Hæzræt Mæ'sume, as he had made such a vow.

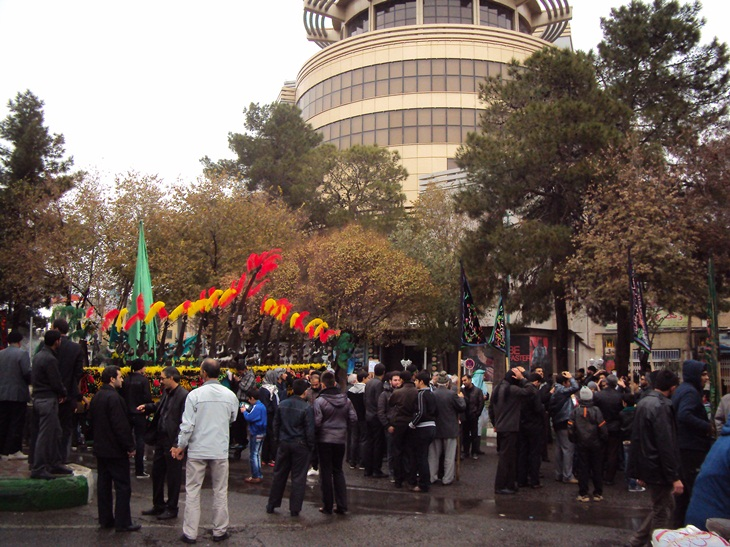
Ashura Mourning in Bagh Shazdeh, Qom

The city of Qom began another era of prosperity in the Qajar era. After Russian forces entered Karaj in 1915, many of the inhabitants of Tehran moved to Qom due to reasons of proximity, and the transfer of the capital from Tehran to Qom was even discussed. The British and Russians defeated prospects of the plan by putting Ahmad Shah Qajar under political pressure. As a center of religious learning Qom fell into decline for about a century from 1820 to 1920 but had a resurgence when Shaykh Abdul Karim Haeri Yazdi accepted an invitation to move from Sultanabad (now called Arak, Iran), where he had been teaching, to Qom.

In 1964–65, before his exile from Iran, the Ayatollah Khomeini led his opposition to the Pahlavi dynasty from Qom. On 19 February 2020, the Iranian Students News Agency reported that the first two cases of the COVID-19 pandemic in Iran were detected in Qom.

On 4 January 2026, during the 2025–2026 Iranian protests, video footage was circulated showed a protester lying in the street in Qom with severe chest and arm injuries; the video was widely shared and described as showing a protester killed by a grenade.

== Demographics ==
Historical population
Year	Pop.	±% p.a.
1986	543,139	—
1991	681,253	+4.64%
1996	777,677	+2.68%
2006	959,116	+2.12%
2011	1,074,036	+2.29%
2016	1,201,158	+2.26%

In the 2006 census, the city's population was 957,496, in 241,827 households. The 2011 census counted 1,074,036 people in 299,752 households. The 2016 census counted 1,201,158 people in 356,976 households.

== Geography ==
Qom, the capital of Qom province, is located 125 kilometers south of Tehran, on a low plain. The shrine of Fatimeh Masumeh, the sister of Imam Reza, is located in this city, which is considered by Shiʿa Muslims holy. The city is located in the boundary of the central desert of Iran (Kavir-e Markazi). At the 2011 census its population was 1,074,036, comprising 545,704 males and 528,332 females.

Qom is a focal center of the Shiʿah. Since the revolution, the clerical population has risen from around 25,000 to more than 45,000 and the non-clerical population has more than tripled to about 700,000. Substantial sums of money in the form of alms and Islamic taxes flow into Qom to the ten Marja'-e taqlid or "Source to be Followed" that reside there. The number of seminary schools in Qom is now over 50, and the number of research institutes and libraries somewhere near 250.

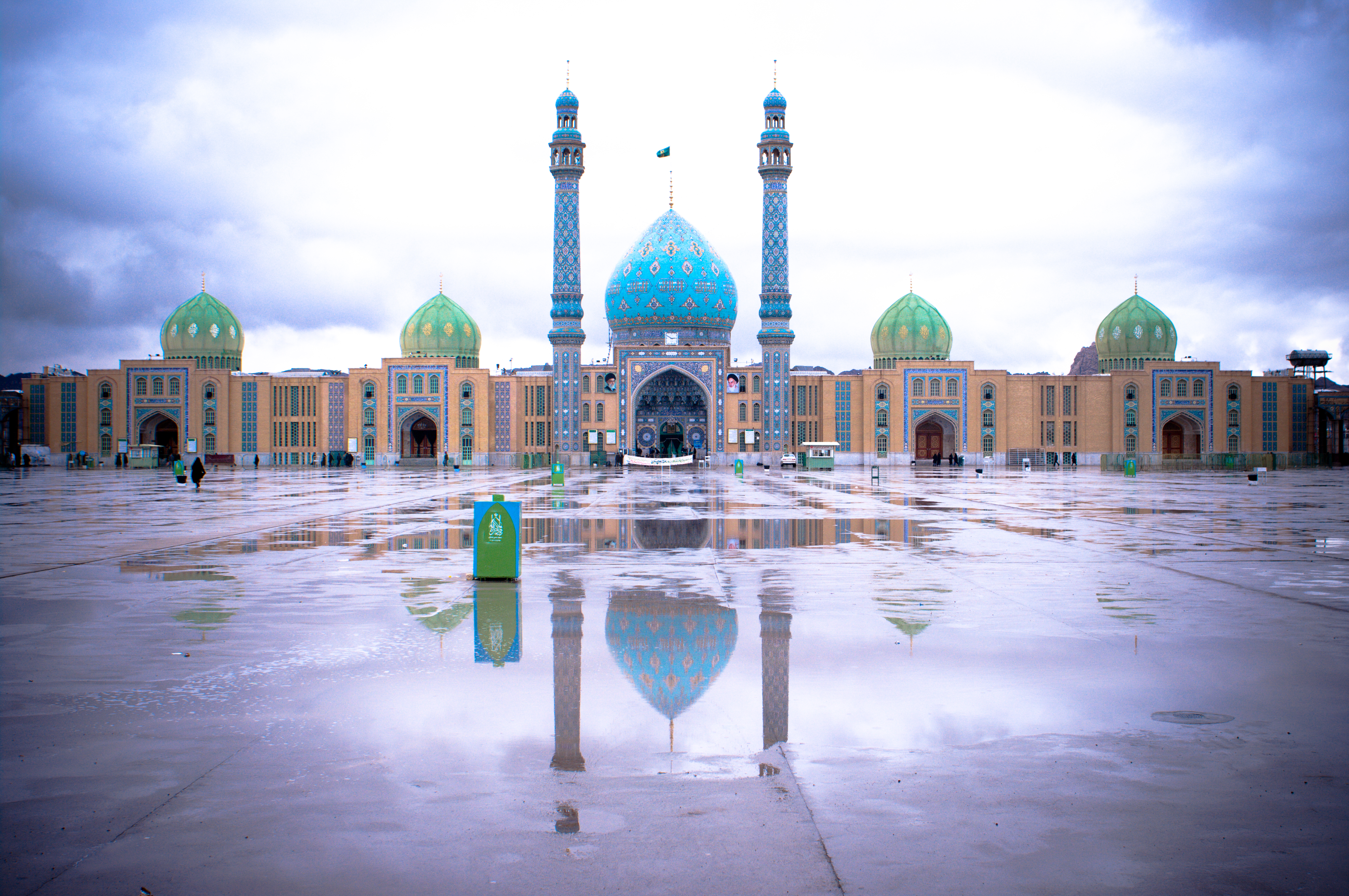
Jamkaran Mosque

Its theological center and the Fatima Masumeh Shrine are prominent features of Qom. Another very popular religious site of pilgrimage formerly outside the city of Qom but now more of a suburb is called Jamkaran. Qom's proximity to Tehran has allowed the clerical establishment easy access to monitor the affairs and decisions of state. Many Grand Ayatollahs possess offices in both Tehran and Qom; many people simply commute between the two cities as they are only 156 kilometres or 97 miles apart.

Southeast of Qom is the ancient city of Kashan. Directly south of Qom lie the towns of Delijan, Mahallat, Naraq, Pardisan City, Kahak, and Jasb. The surrounding area to the west of Qom is populated by Tafresh, Saveh, and Ashtian and Jafarieh. Arak city, Industrial Capital of Iran, is in the southwest of Qom.

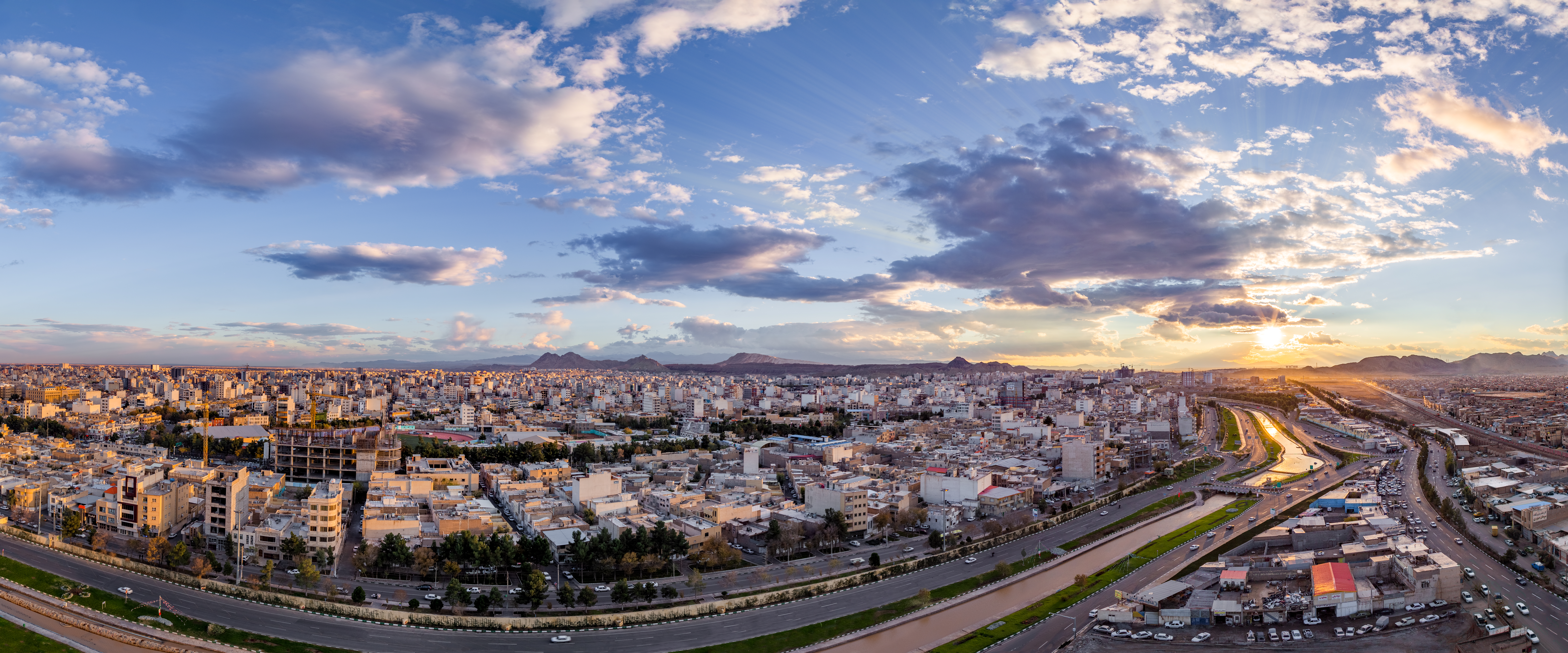
View Of Southwestern Qom

=== Climate ===
Qom has a hot desert climate bordering a cold desert climate based on Köppen climate classification (BWh bordering on BWk) and has an arid climate based on Trewartha climate classification (BW). There is low annual rainfall due to remoteness from the sea and being situated in the vicinity of the subtropical anticyclone aloft. Summer weather is very hot and essentially rainless. Winter weather can vary from warm to – when Siberian air masses are driven south across the Alborz Mountains by blocking over Europe – frigid. An example of the latter situation was in January 2008 when minima fell to −23 °C or −9.4 °F on the 15th. Earlier similar situations occurred in January 1964 and to a lesser extent January 1950, January 1972 and December 1972.

The highest recorded temperature was 47 °C (117 °F) on 11 July 2010. The lowest recorded temperature was −23 °C (−9 °F) on 15 January 2008.

Climate data for Qom (1986–2010, records 1986–2020)
Month	Jan	Feb	Mar	Apr	May	Jun	Jul	Aug	Sep	Oct	Nov	Dec	Year
Record high °C (°F)	23.4 (74.1)	26.5 (79.7)	35.5 (95.9)	37.0 (98.6)	41.8 (107.2)	45.9 (114.6)	47.0 (116.6)	45.6 (114.1)	42.3 (108.1)	37.7 (99.9)	31.0 (87.8)	22.5 (72.5)	47.0 (116.6)
Mean daily maximum °C (°F)	10.2 (50.4)	13.6 (56.5)	19.1 (66.4)	26.0 (78.8)	31.8 (89.2)	37.9 (100.2)	40.3 (104.5)	39.4 (102.9)	34.9 (94.8)	27.7 (81.9)	18.9 (66.0)	12.2 (54.0)	26.0 (78.8)
Daily mean °C (°F)	4.2 (39.6)	7.1 (44.8)	12.0 (53.6)	18.3 (64.9)	23.6 (74.5)	29.1 (84.4)	31.8 (89.2)	30.3 (86.5)	25.2 (77.4)	19.0 (66.2)	11.5 (52.7)	6.1 (43.0)	18.2 (64.8)
Mean daily minimum °C (°F)	−1.9 (28.6)	0.6 (33.1)	5.0 (41.0)	10.5 (50.9)	15.4 (59.7)	20.2 (68.4)	23.4 (74.1)	21.2 (70.2)	15.6 (60.1)	10.3 (50.5)	4.1 (39.4)	−0.1 (31.8)	10.4 (50.7)
Record low °C (°F)	−23.0 (−9.4)	−11.2 (11.8)	−11.0 (12.2)	−0.2 (31.6)	5.4 (41.7)	8.0 (46.4)	15.0 (59.0)	11.8 (53.2)	6.5 (43.7)	0.6 (33.1)	−11.0 (12.2)	−10.5 (13.1)	−23.0 (−9.4)
Average precipitation mm (inches)	25.4 (1.00)	20.5 (0.81)	27.7 (1.09)	20.2 (0.80)	10.4 (0.41)	2.3 (0.09)	0.7 (0.03)	0.3 (0.01)	0.8 (0.03)	6.2 (0.24)	14.3 (0.56)	19.4 (0.76)	148.2 (5.83)
Average precipitation days (≥ 1.0 mm)	4.4	4.1	4.2	3.9	2.0	0.4	0.2	0.1	0.3	1.8	2.6	3.2	27.2
Average snowy days	3.1	1.4	0.3	0.0	0.0	0.0	0.0	0.0	0.0	0.0	0.1	0.9	5.8
Average relative humidity (%)	66	58	48	42	33	24	23	24	26	38	52	66	41
Mean monthly sunshine hours	185.0	194.0	221.5	233.3	296.6	351.5	354.5	347.3	309.9	263.4	204.9	172.7	3,134.6
Source: Iran Meteorological Organization (records), (temperatures), (precipitation), (humidity), (days with precipitation and snow), (sunshine)

== Governance ==
Authority for the city lies with the mayor, who is elected by a municipal board. The municipal board is periodically elected by the city's residents. The municipal central office is located on Saheli Street. The current mayor of Qom is Mohammad Delbari.

=== Old districts ===
- Soltan Mohammad Sharif
- Bagh Pambeh
- Jouy Shour
- Safaiyyeh
- Sadough
- Yakhchal Ghazi
- Shah Ahmad Ghasim
- Bagh Ashrafi
- Darvaze Ghale'
- Khandagh
- Ghale Amou Hossein
- Barassoun
- Hammam Taalaar
- Sang Band
- Eshgh Ali
- Tekyeh Agha Sayyed Hassan
- Arabestan
- Darvazeh Kashan
- Sarbakhsh
- Sar Howz
- Alvandiyeh
- Gozar Sadegh
- Lab Chaal
- Chehel Akhtaran
- Razavia
- Manba' Ab
- Nikouyee
- Nowbahar
- Allouchou
- Khak-Faraj
- Haj Zaynal
- Haj Khalil
- Bagh Shazdeh
- Chehel Derakht
- Zad
- Chahar Imamzadeh
- Hanif Nizhad
- Paminar
- Qom Now
- Maydan Now
- Zandyan va Handyan
- Darvazeh Choubi

=== Modern districts ===
- Tohid
- Shahr-e-Gha'em
- Panzdah-e-Khordad
- Jahan Bini
- Talighani Town
- Baajak Town
- Farhangian Town
- Tavaneer Town
- Fatimia Town
- Imam Hassan Town
- Imam Hossein Residential Area
- Bonyad Residential Area
- Mahdia Town
- Imam Khomeini Town
- Pardisan City
- Safa Shahr
- Qods Town

== Tourism ==
=== Historical and cultural heritage ===
Iran's Cultural Heritage Organization lists 195 sites of historical and cultural significance in Qom. But the more visited sites of Qom are:

- Fatima Masumeh Shrine
- Jamkaran Mosque
- Azam Mosque
- Imam Hassan Al-Asgari Mosque
- Al-Ghadir Mosque
- Atiq Mosque in Qom
- Feyzieh Religious School
- Mar'ashi Najafi Library, with over 500,000 handwritten texts and copies.
- Paminar School
- Jahangirkhan School
- Fath-Ali Shah Qajar Tomb
- Mohammad Shah Qajar Tomb
- Shah Abbas II Tomb
- Shah Suleiman I & Shah Safi Tomb
- Ali Ibn Ja'afar Tomb
- Seyyed Hossein Borujerdi's Historical House
- Ruhollah Khomeini's House
- Jamkaran Historical Castle

=== Museums ===
- Astaneh Moqaddaseh Museum (Qom Central Museum)
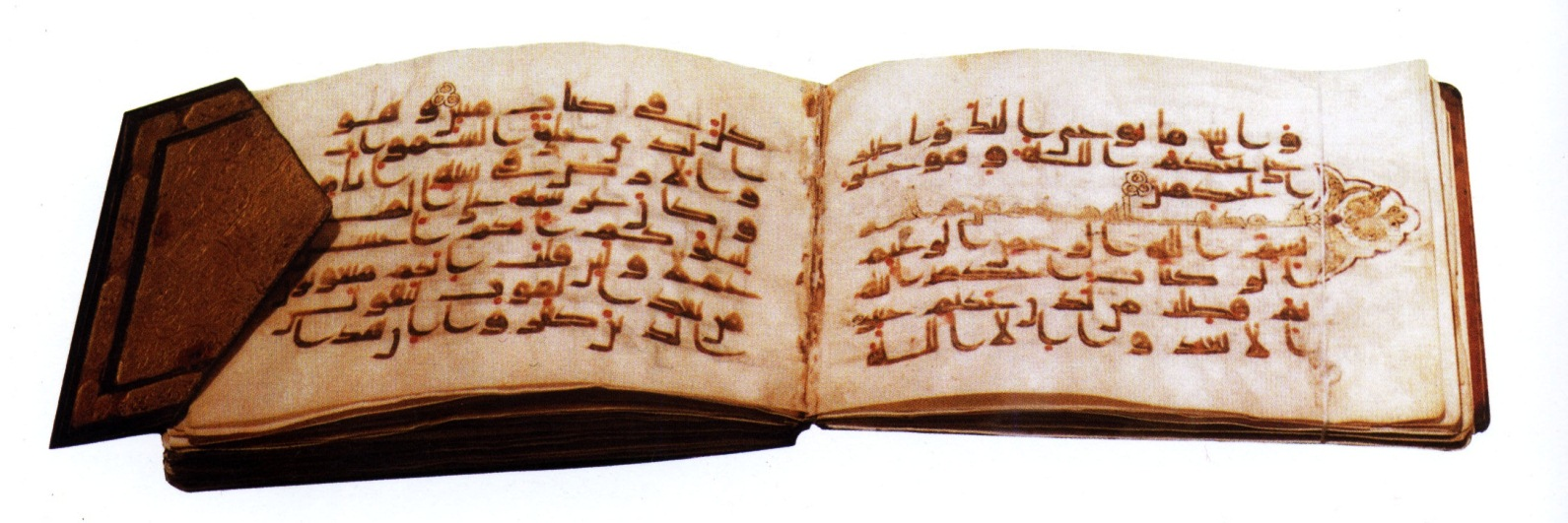
  Quran manuscript written by Ali ibn Musa in the Qom Museum
- Anthropology Museum Of Qom
- The Museum Of Traditional Arts
- The Museum Of Natural History & Wildlife
- The Museum Of Astronomy

== Educational institutions ==
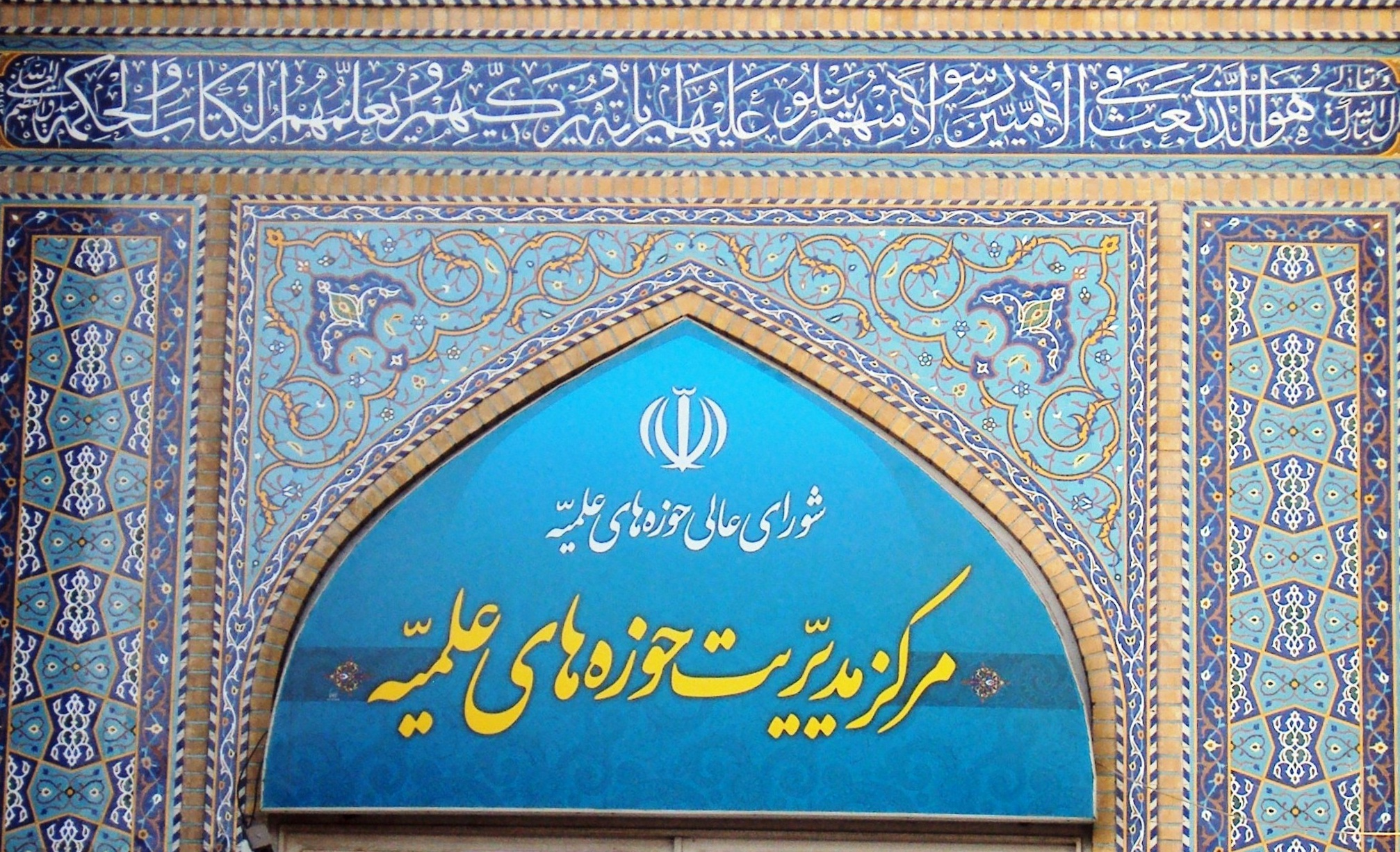
Iranian Seminaries Management Centre

Qom is well known for its many religious seminaries and institutes that offer advanced religious studies, which made this city the largest center for Shia scholarship in the world. There are an estimated 50,000 seminarians in the city coming from 80 countries, including Iraq, Lebanon, Syria and Pakistan. Qom has seminaries for women and some non-Shia students. Most of the seminaries teach their students modern social sciences and Western thought as well as traditional religious studies.

=== Hawzah 'Ilmiyya Qom (Qom Seminary) ===
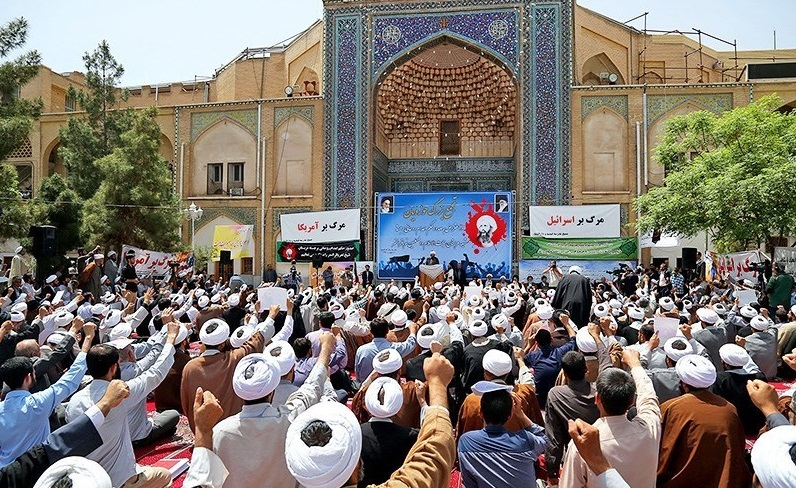
Qom Seminary

The Hawzah (a short form of al-Hawzah al-Ilmiyya), which presently consists of over 200 education and research centres and organisations, catering for over 40,000 scholars and students from over 80 sovereign states. The modern Qom hawza was revitalized by Abdul Karim Haeri Yazdi and Grand Ayatollah Borujerdi and is barely a century old. There are nearly 300,000 clerics in Iran's seminaries.

=== Universities and seminaries ===
- College of Farabi, University of Tehran
- University of Qom
- Mofid University
- Qom University of Medical Sciences
- Al-Mustafa International University
- Qom University of Technology
- Al-Zahra Seminary
- Seyyed Hassan Shirazi Seminary
- Imam Hossein Seminary
- Imam Baghir Seminary
- Imam Mahdi Seminary
- Rasoul A'zam Seminary
- Razavia Seminary
- Satia Seminary
- Imam Khomeini Seminary
- Aba-Salih Seminary
- Al-Mahdi Seminary
- Al-Hadi Seminary
- Haghani Seminary
- Janbazan Seminary
- Resalat Seminary
- Itrat Seminary
- Darb-Astana Seminary
- Seyyed Abdol Aziz Seminary
- Toloo-e-Mehr Educational Institute
- Shahab Danesh University
- Pardis-e-Daneshgah-e-Tehran University
- IRIB University Of Qom
- Qom's Industrial College
- Azad Islami University of Pardisan
- Payam-Nour College of Pardisan
- Ma'sumia University
- Hikmat College
- The University of Religions & Denominations
- Quran & Hadis University
- Fekr-e-Eslami University
- Ma'aref-e-Islami University
- Computer Research Center of Islamic Sciences
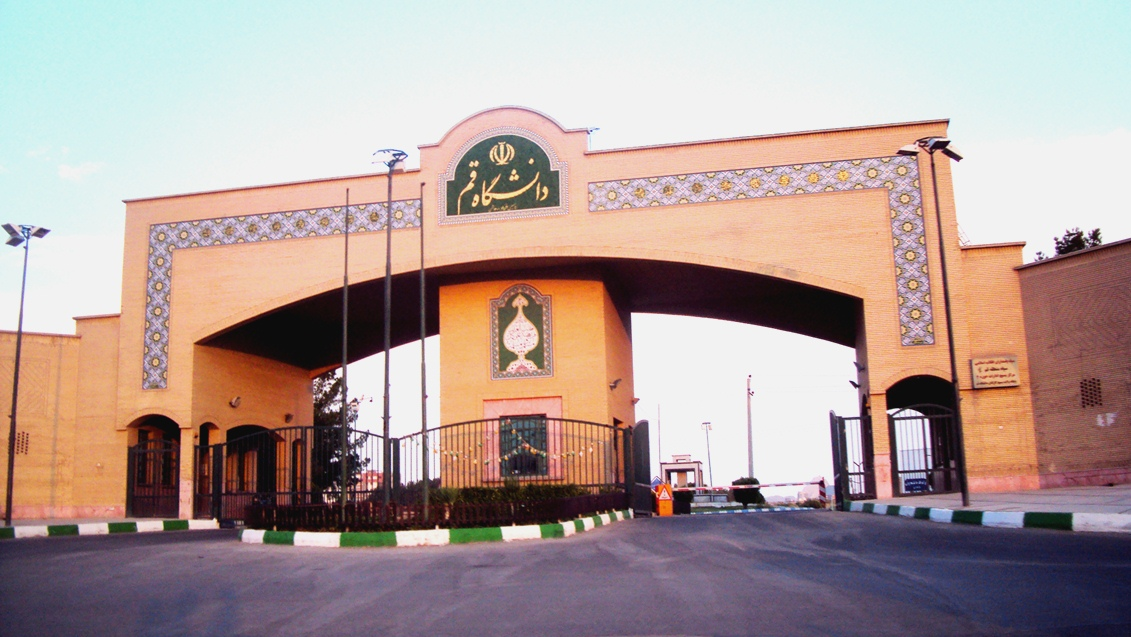
University of Qom

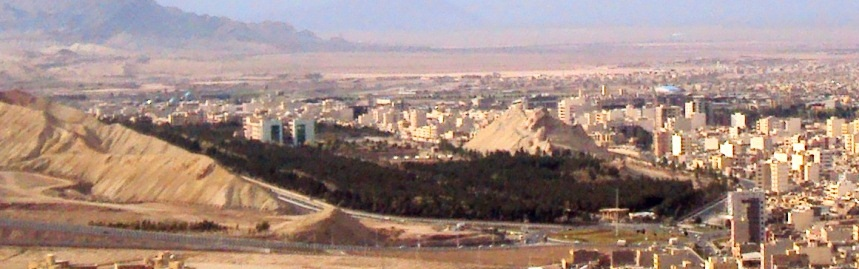
Mofid University

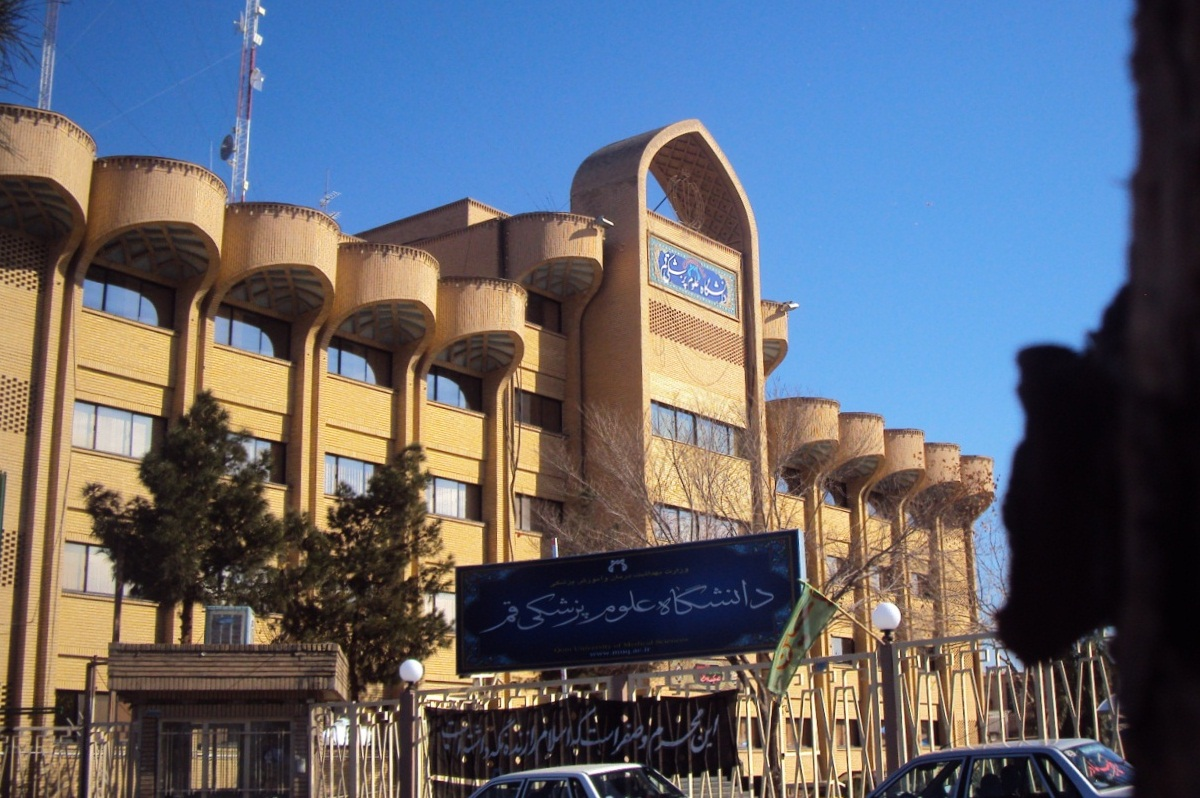
Qom University of Medical Sciences

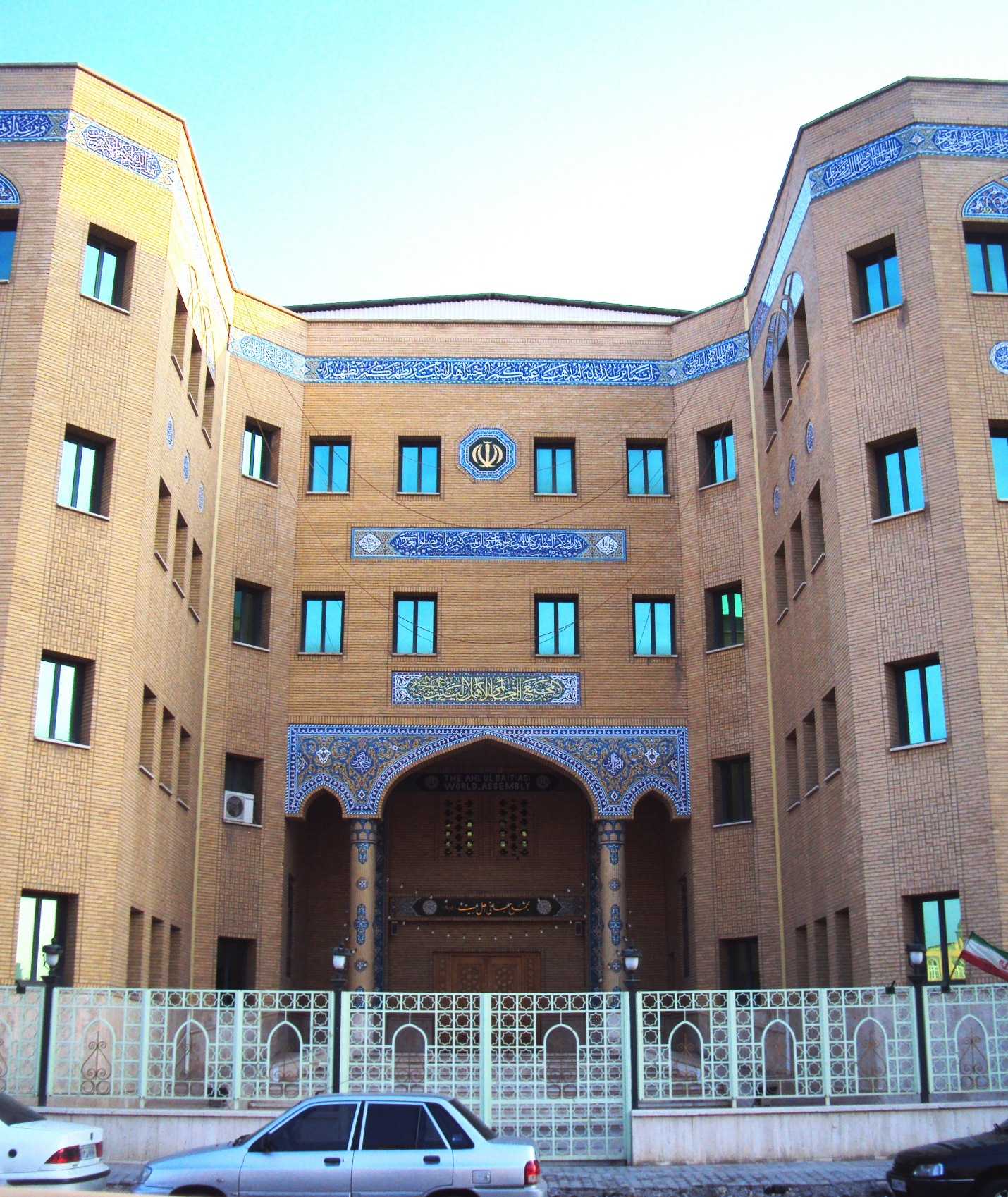
Ahl Al-Bayt World Assembly

=== Fordow uranium enrichment facility ===
The Fordow uranium enrichment facility is located 20 miles north east of Qom. In January 2012 the International Atomic Energy Agency (IAEA) announced that Iran had started producing uranium enriched up to 20% for medical purposes and that material "remains under the agency's containment and surveillance." Iranian authorities state the facility is built deep in a mountain because of repeated threats by Israel to attack such facilities, which Israel believes can be used to produce nuclear weapons. However, attacking a nuclear facility so close to a city considered so holy in Shia Islam brings concern of a potential risk of a Shiite religious response. On 13 June 2025 the facility was attacked by the Israeli Air Force and on 22 June the United States military struck it, with President Donald Trump claiming it had been "obliterated".

== Transportation ==
Qom International Airport (under construction).

== Notable people ==
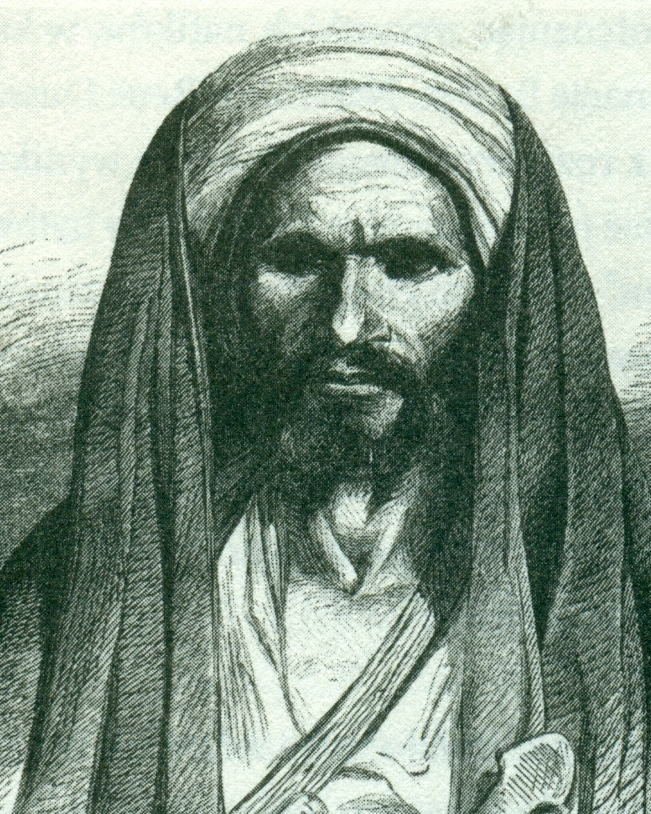
Hasan-i Sabbah

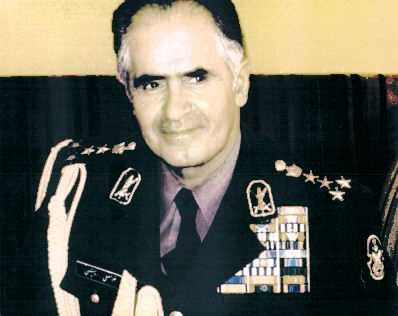
Gholam Ali Oveissi

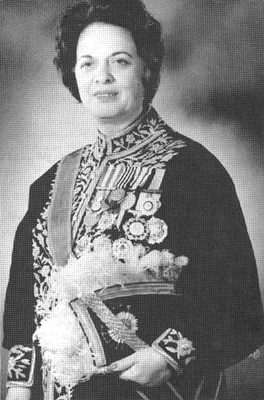
Farrokhroo Parsa

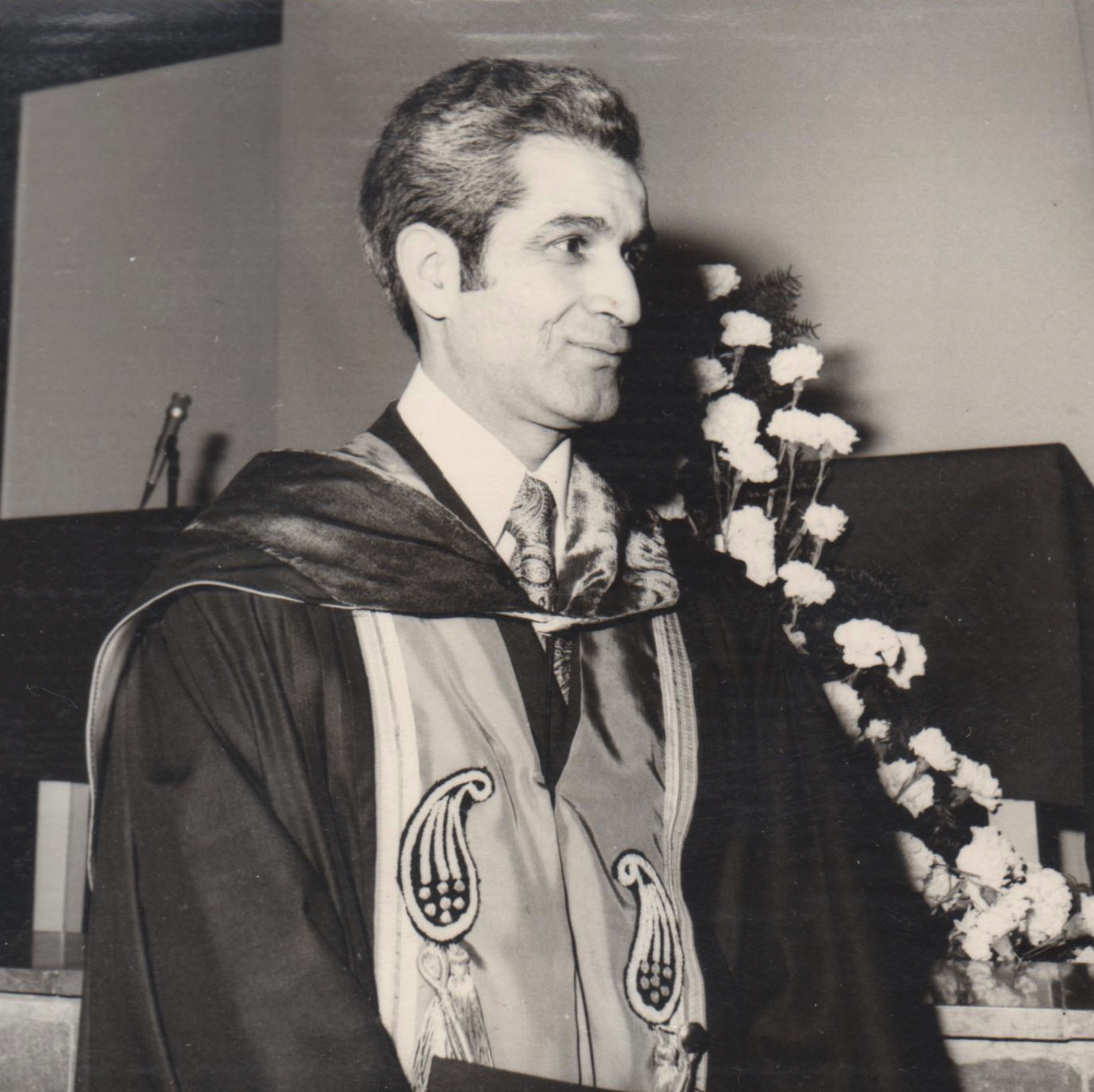
Naser Kamalian

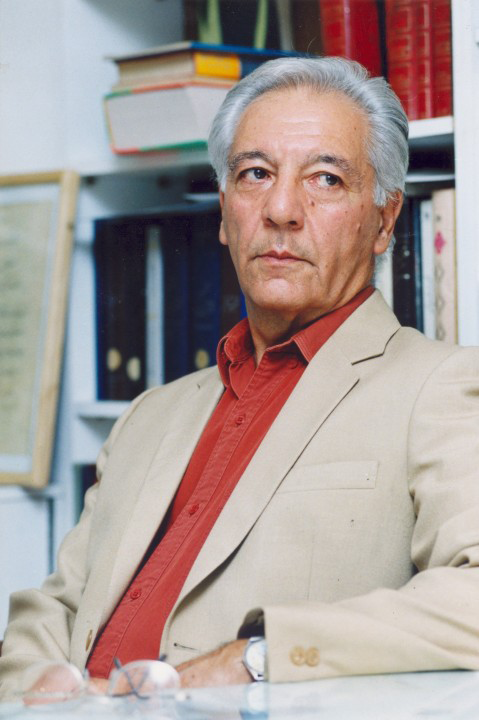
Azartash Azarnoush

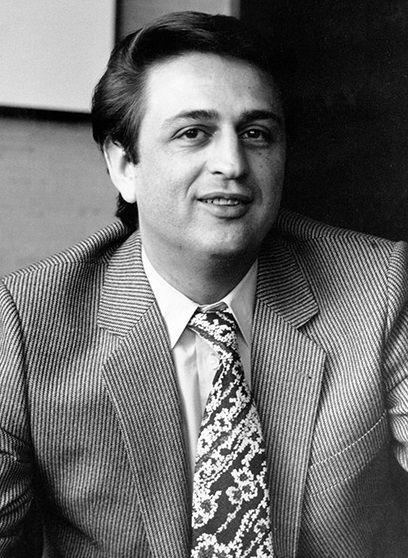
Sadeq Tabatabaei

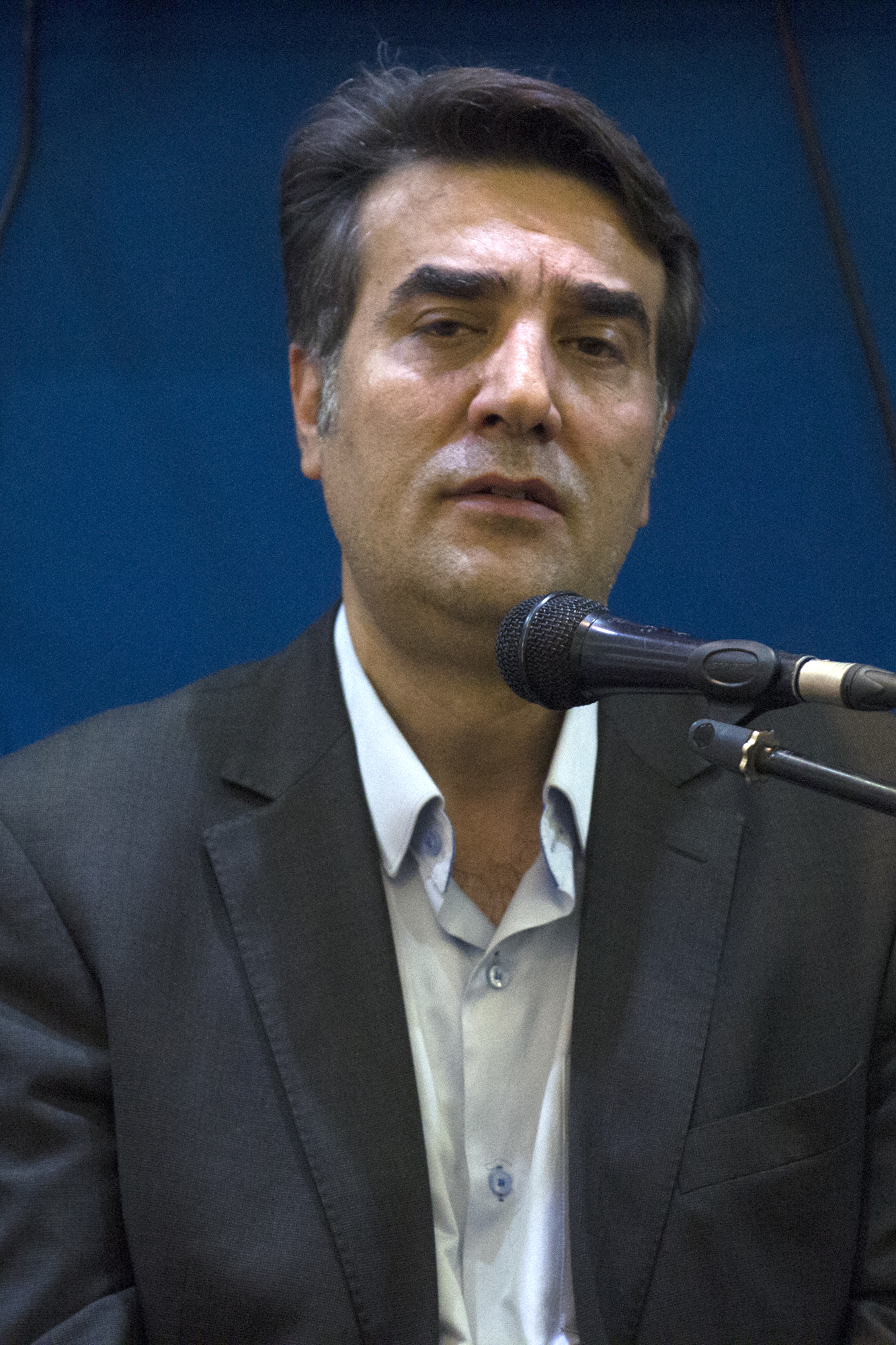
Hamid Reza Noorbakhsh

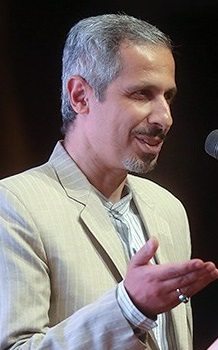
Javad Razavian

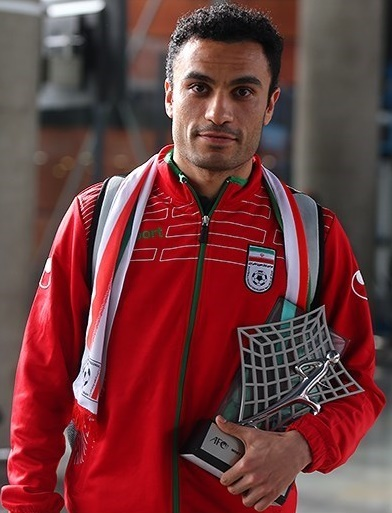
Ali Asghar Hassanzadeh

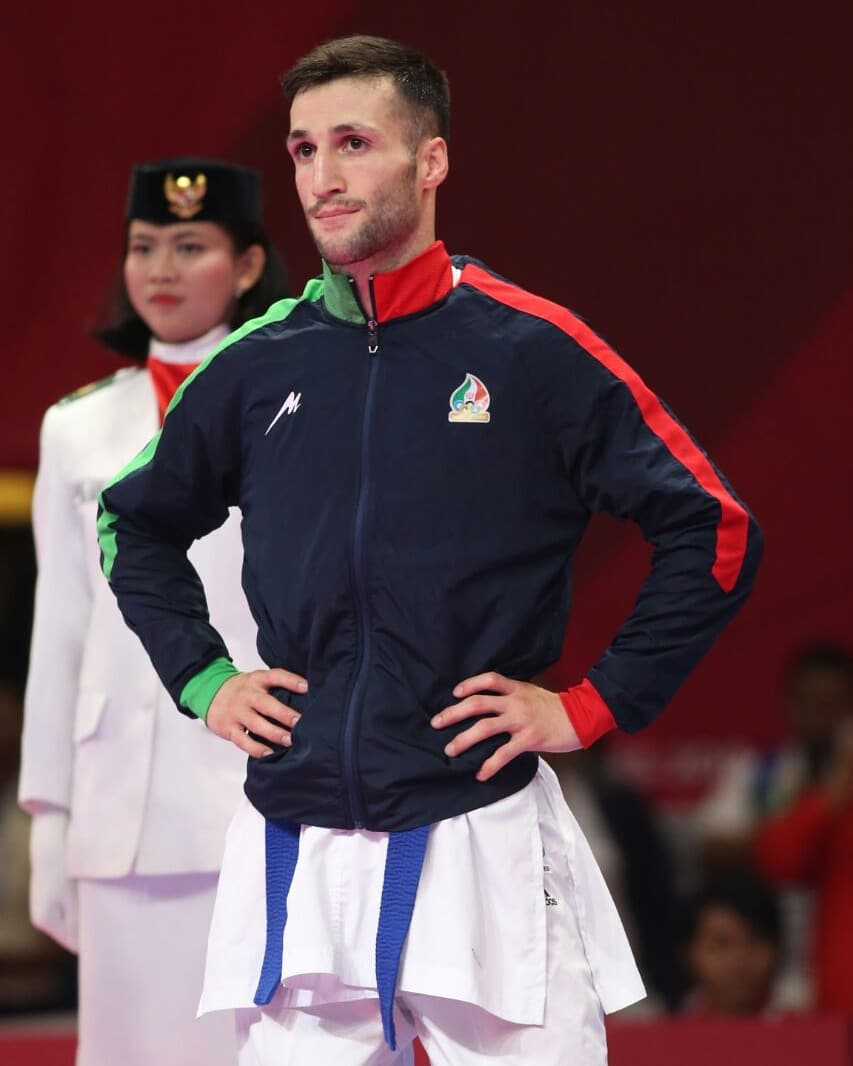
Amir Mehdizadeh

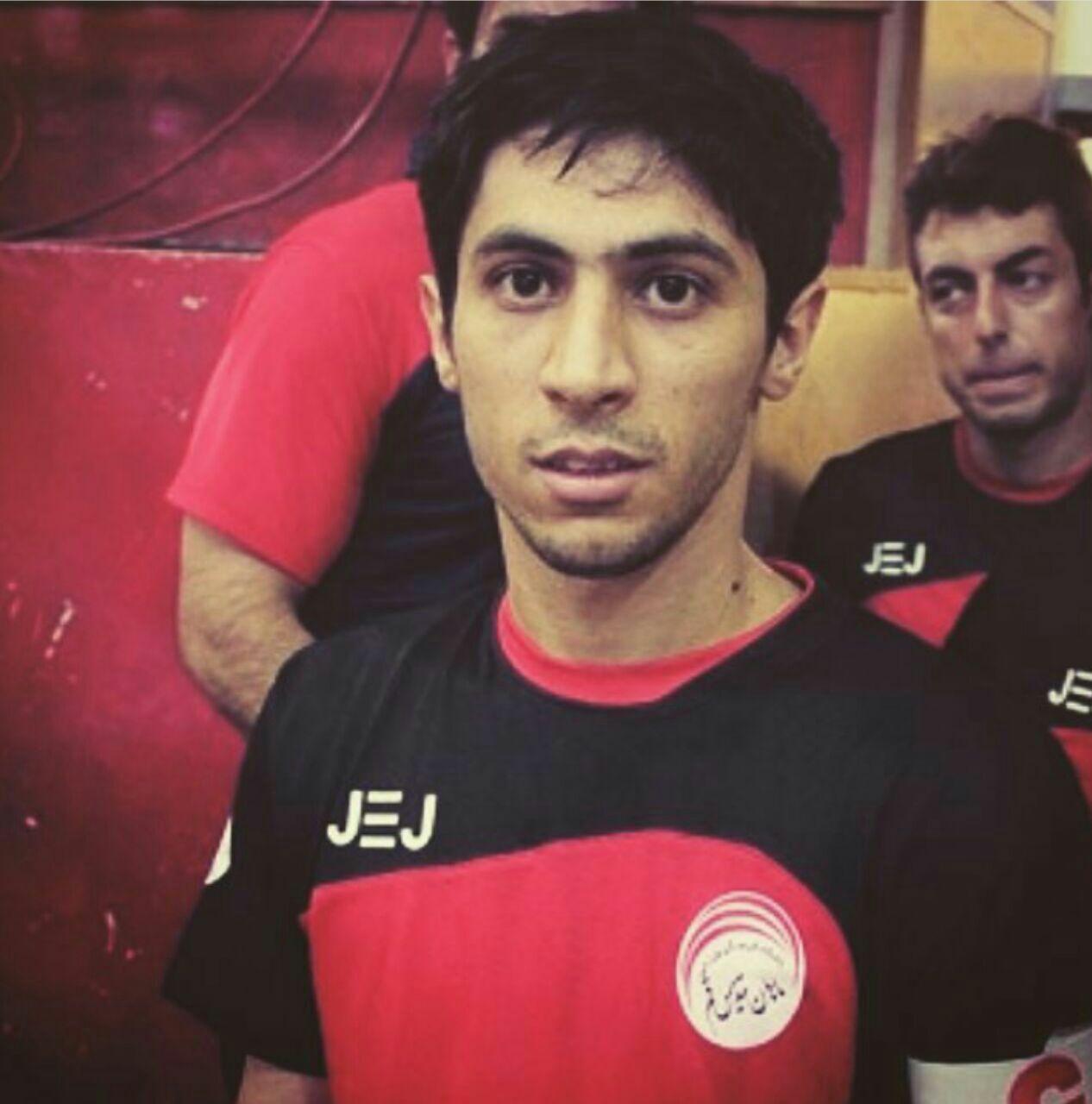
Alireza Vafaei

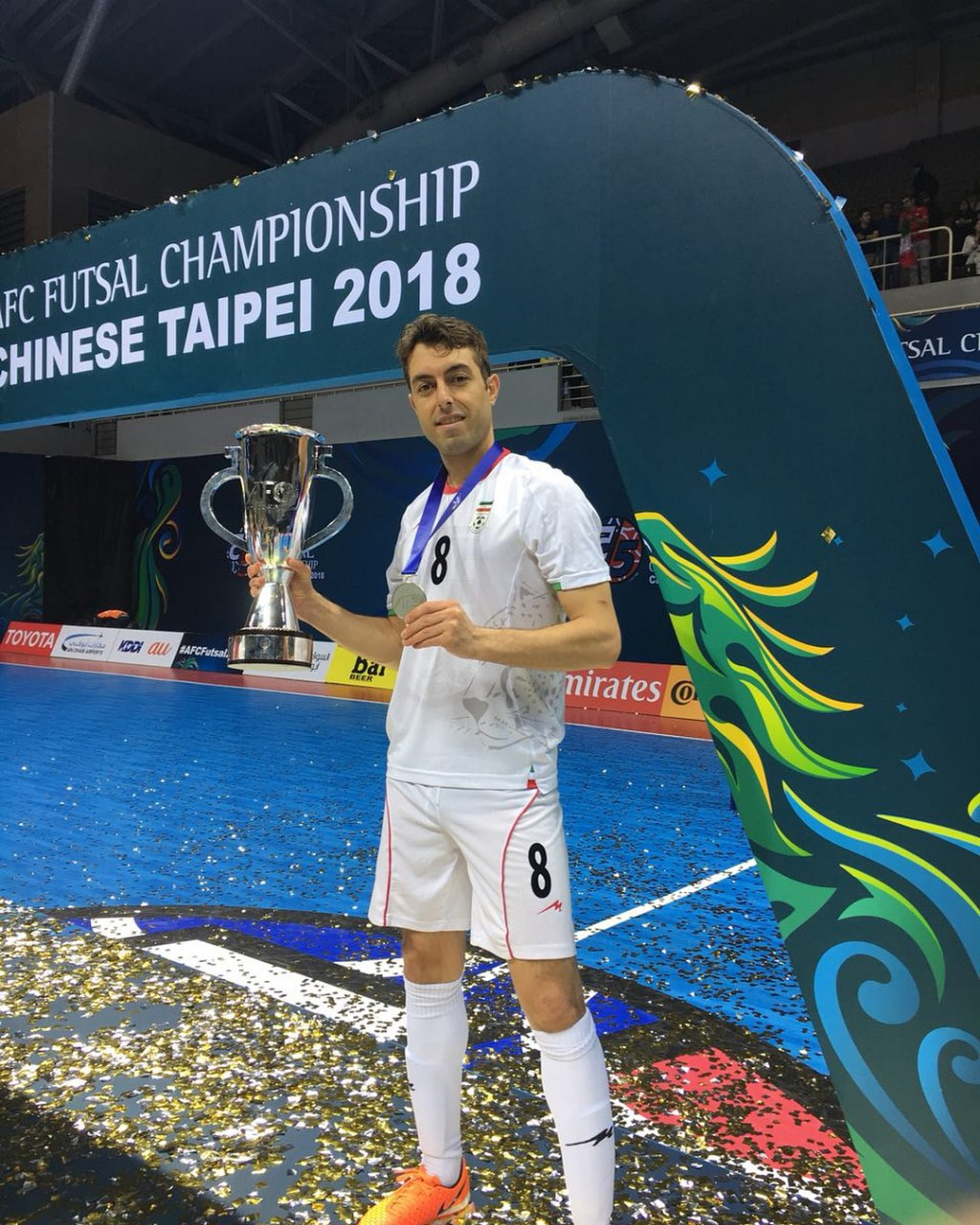
Abolghasem Orouji

- Hassan-i Sabbah (1050-1124) - Leader of the Assassins and the Nizari Ismaili State
- Gholam Ali Oveissi (1918–1984) – General and the Chief Commander of the Imperial Iranian Armed Forces
- Farrokhroo Parsa (1922–1980) – physician, educator and politician in the Parliament of Iran (1963–68), Minister of Education (1968–71), the first female cabinet minister of an Iranian government; executed by a firing squad in 1980, following the Iranian Revolution
- Parviz Shapour (1924-1999) – writer
- Naser Kamalian (b. 1931) – medical scholar
- Nasrollah Soltaninejad (b. 1936) – wrestler
- Azartash Azarnoush (b. 1937) – linguist and scholar
- Bahram Afzali (1938–1984) – Commander of Iranian Navy
- Sadeq Tabatabaei (1943–2015) – politician
- Mohammad Reza Nasehi (b. 1944) – weightlifter
- Fathali Oveisi (1946–2021) – actor
- Mostafa Pourmohammadi (b. 1960) – politician and Prosecutor
- Mahdi Mirbaqiri (b. 1961) – Ayatollah
- Nasser Zahedi (b. 1961) - doctor
- Faezeh Hashemi (b. 1963), journalist, women rights activist, and former member of Iranian parliament
- Hamid Reza Noorbakhsh (b. 1965) – singer
- Majid Abdolhosseini (b. 1972) – karateka
- Mehdi Khalaji (b. 1973) – writer, scholar of Islamic studies and political analyst
- Javad Razavian (b. 1974) –actor
- Mohsen Hassanzadeh (b. 1974) – futsal coach
- Vahid Ghiasi (b. 1975) – futsal coach
- Alireza Katiraei (b. 1976) – karateka
- Mohsen Rabbani (b. 1983) – pole vaulter
- Ali Asghar Hassanzadeh (b. 1987) – futsal player
- Saeid Taghizadeh (b. 1988) – futsal player
- Amir Mehdizadeh (b. 1989) – karateka
- Alireza Vafaei (b. 1989) – futsal player
- Abolghasem Orouji (b. 1989) – futsal player
- Hamid Naderi Yeganeh (b. 1990) – mathematical artist
- Mehdi Hosseini (b. 1993) – football player
- Elnaz Ghasemi (b. 1996) – handball player
- Alireza Nejati (b. 1998) – wrestler

== Twin towns ==
Qom is twinned with:

- Baalbek, Lebanon
- Karbala, Iraq
- Najaf, Iraq
- Konya, Turkey
- Santiago de Compostela, Spain
- Karachi, Pakistan

== Gallery ==
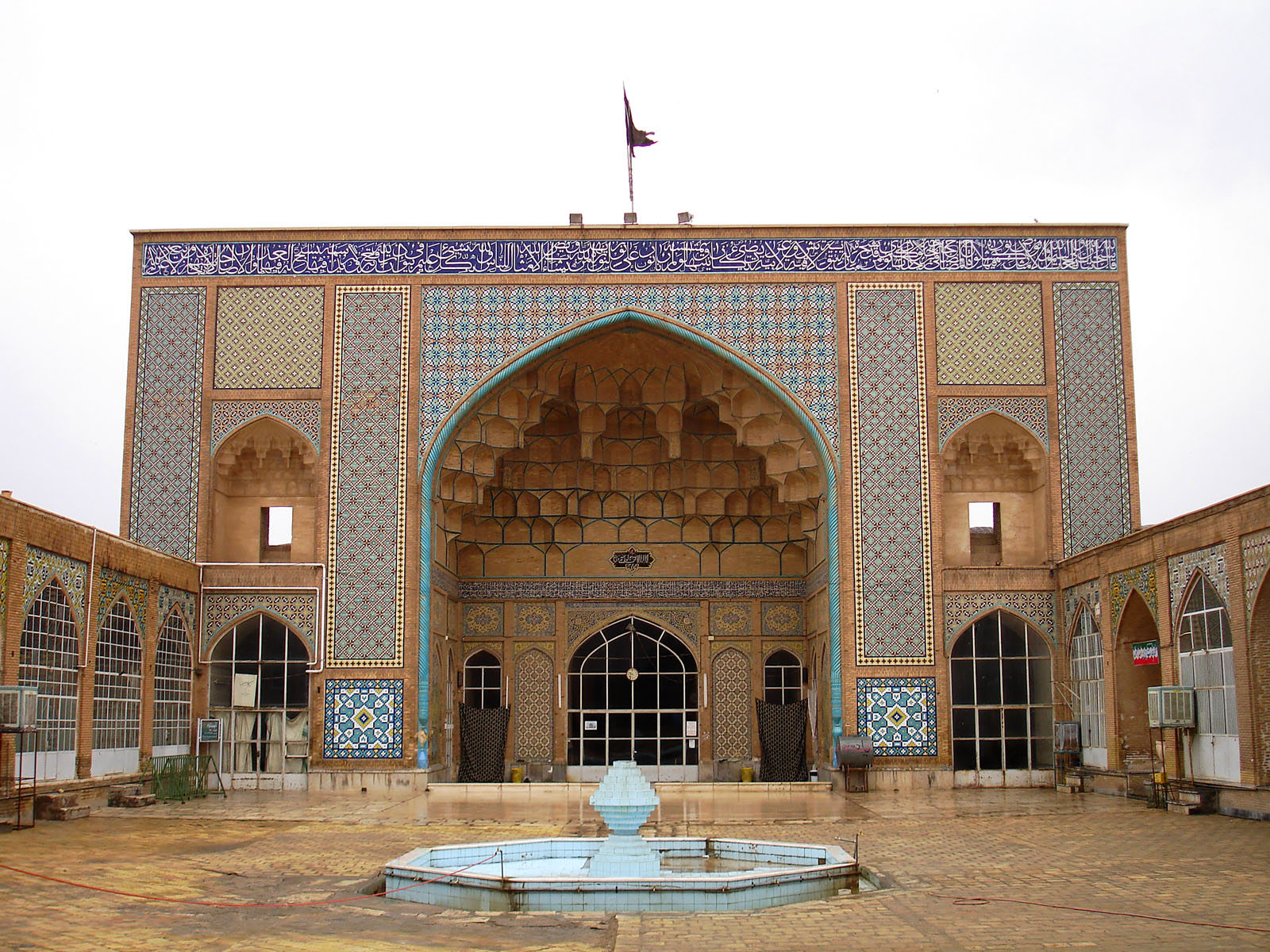
Qom Mosque

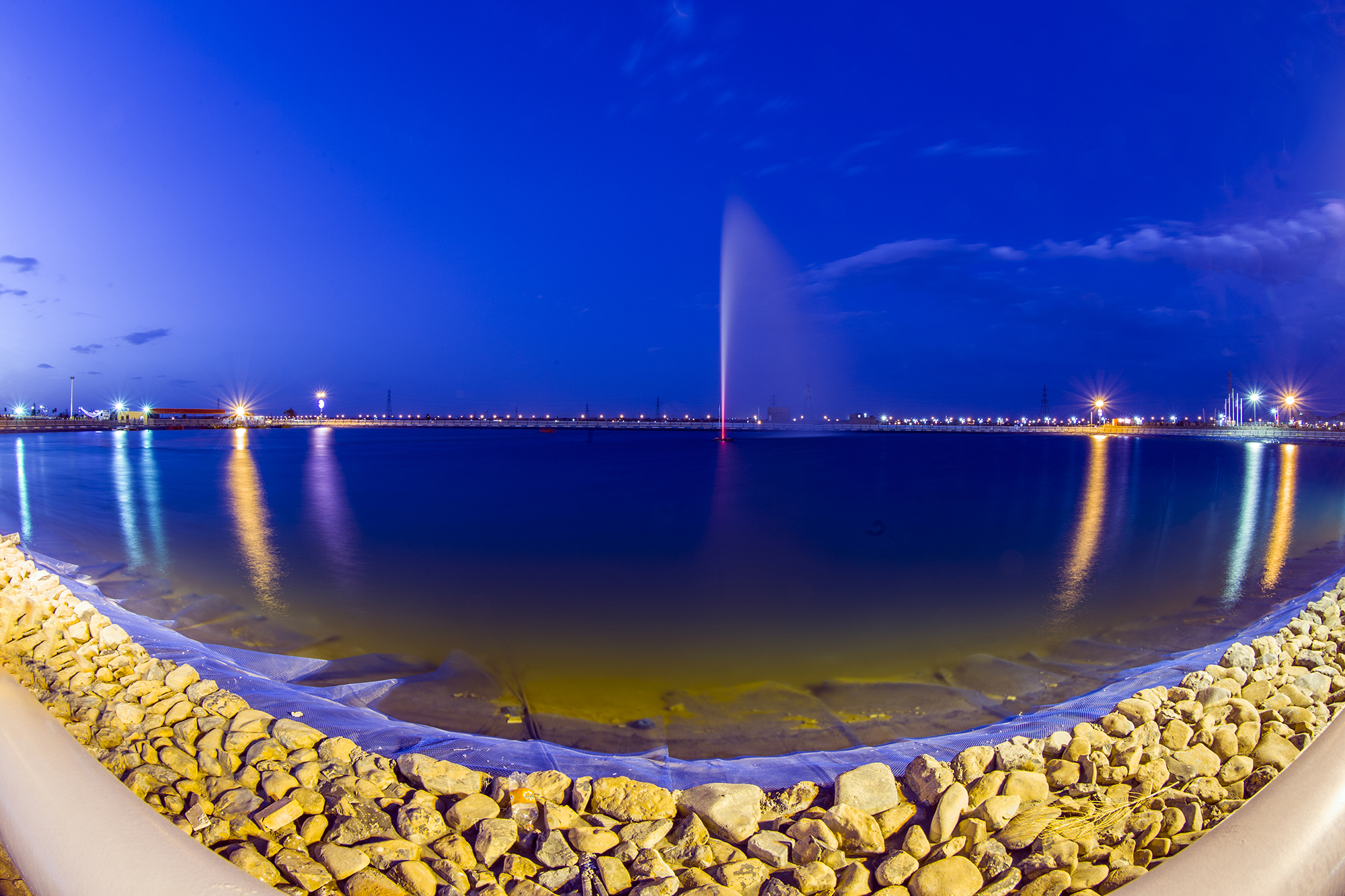
Young Water Park

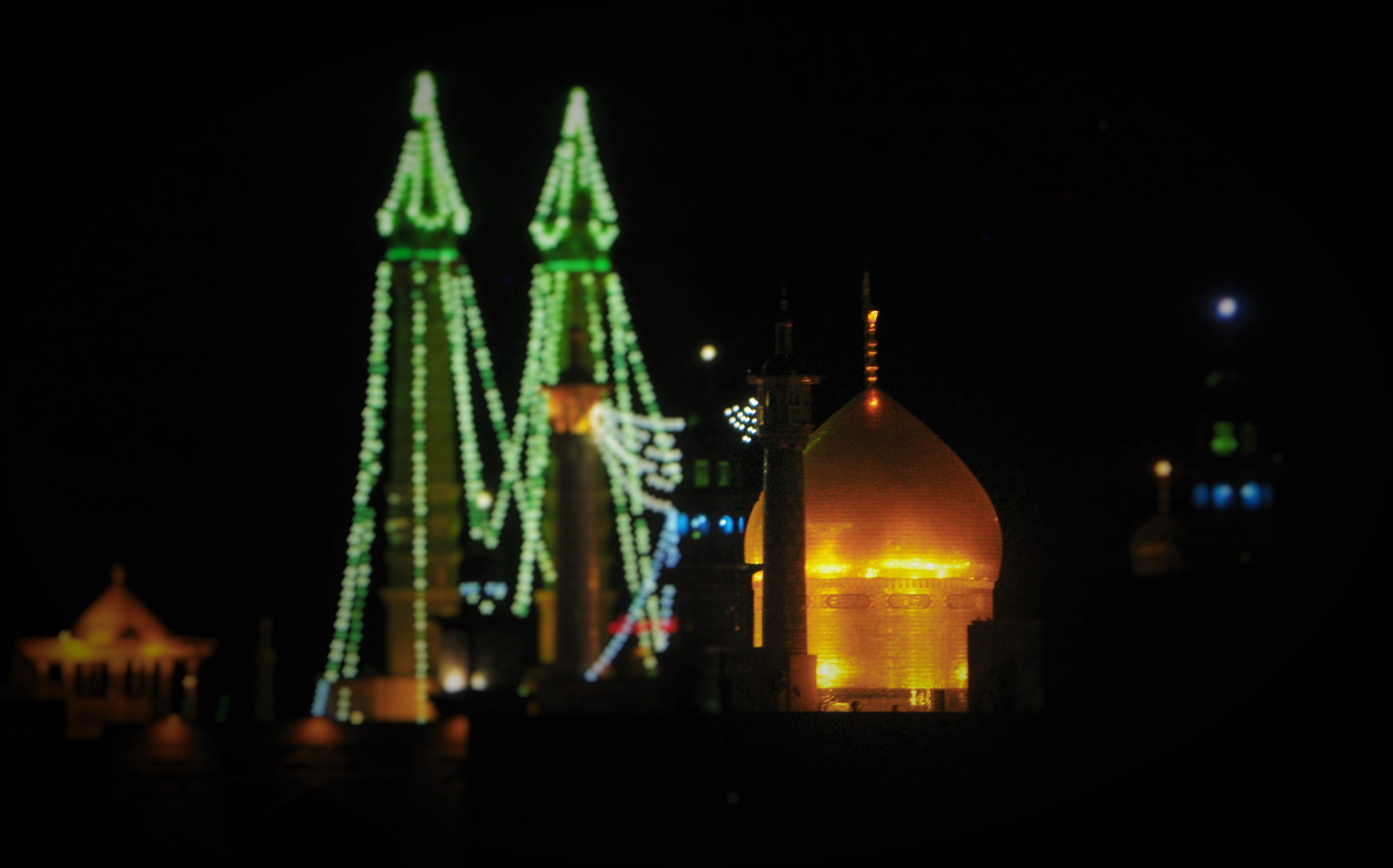
Shrine of Fatimah Masumah

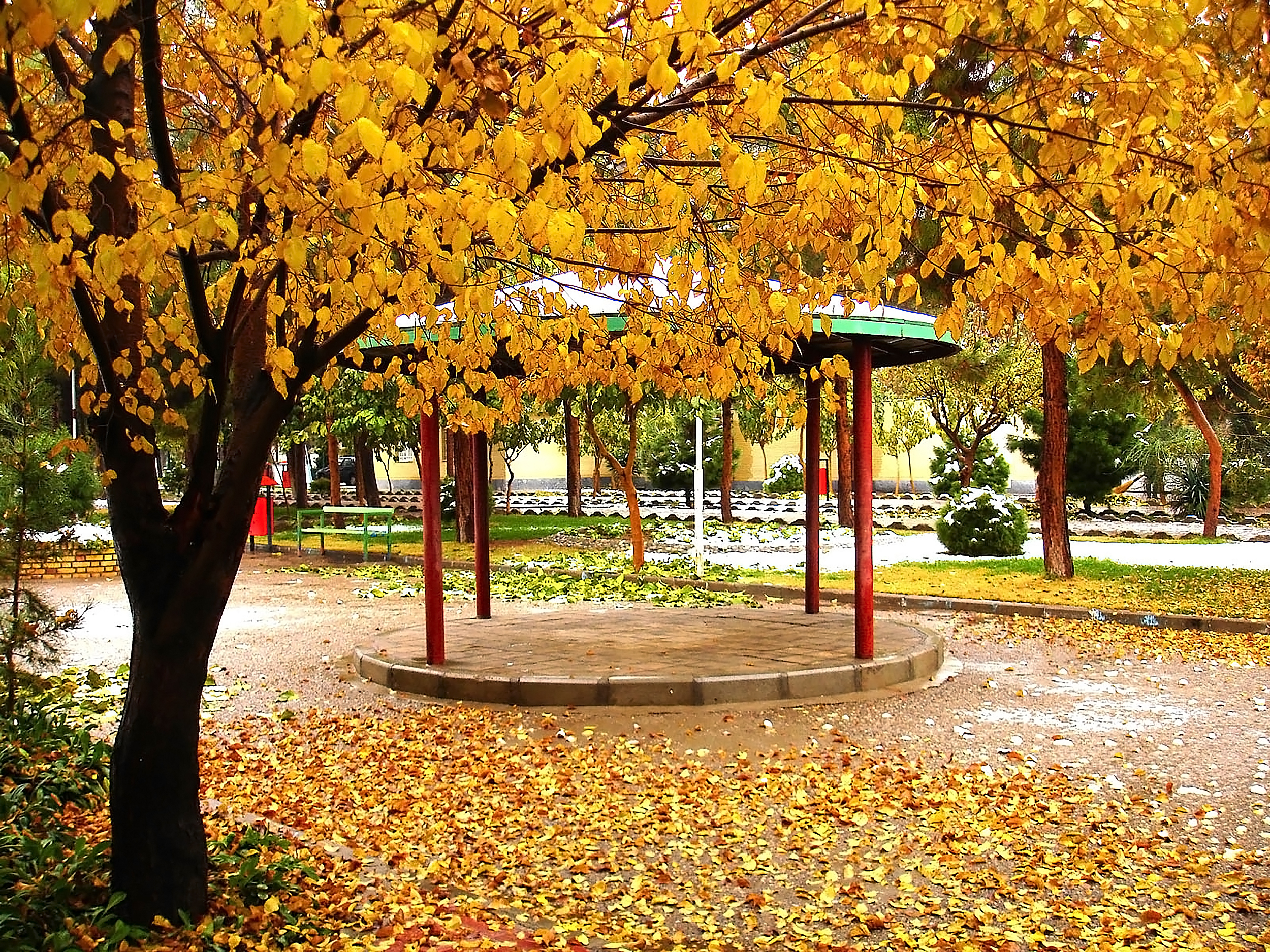
The Hashemi park of Qom in autumn

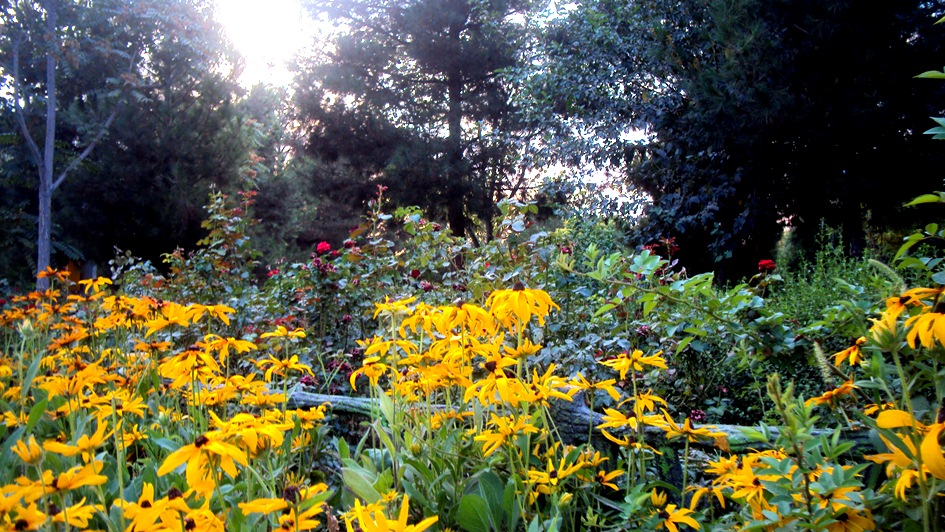
Alavi park

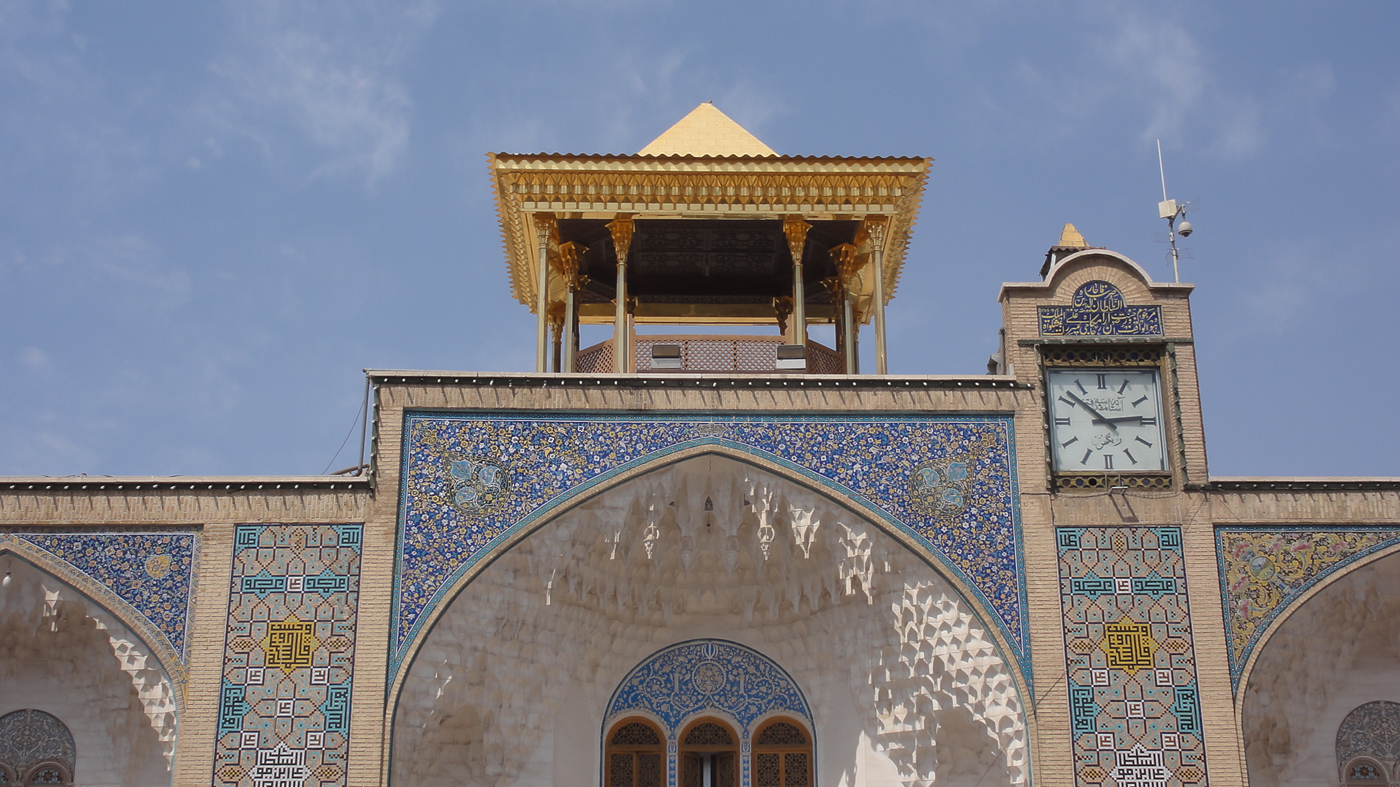

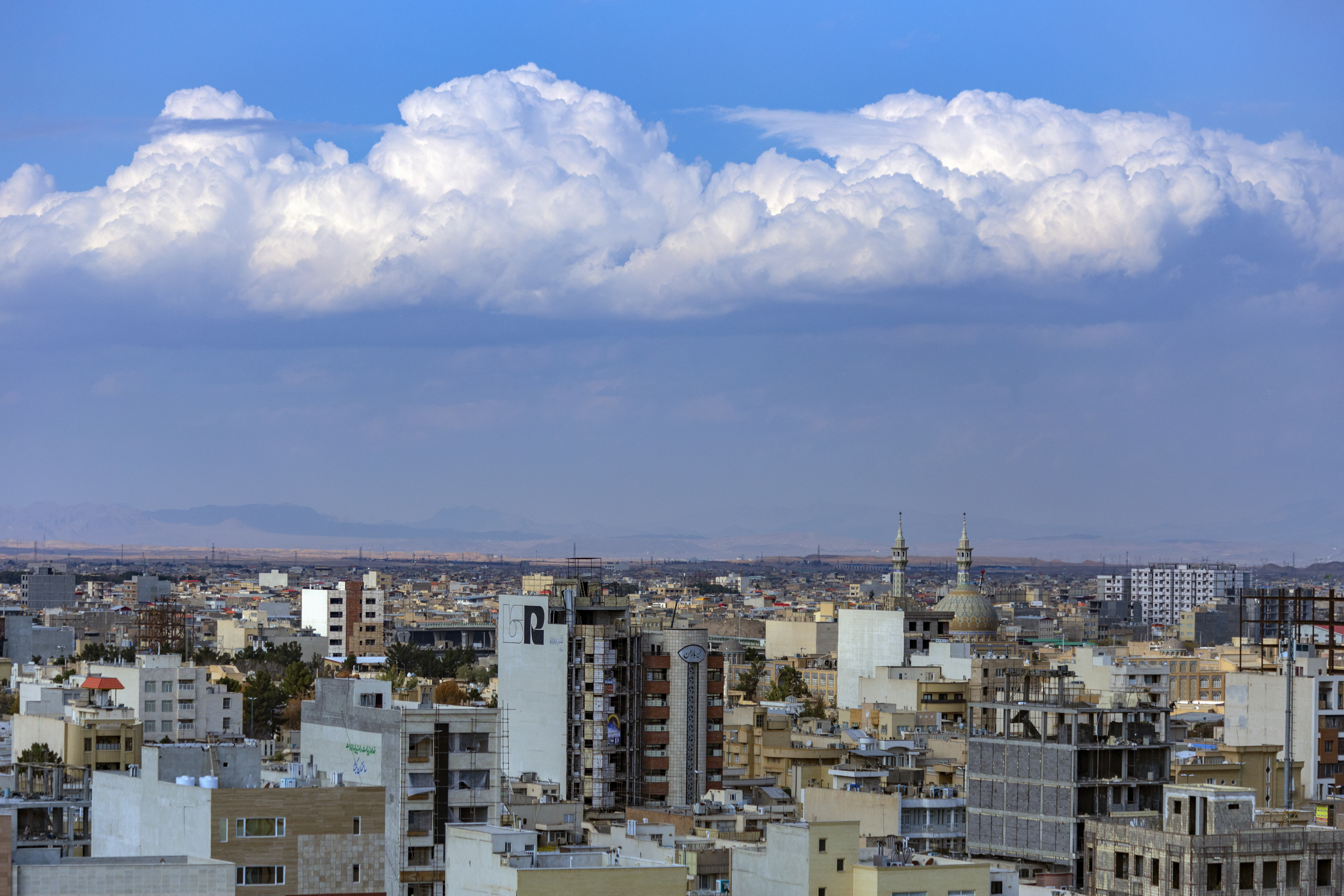

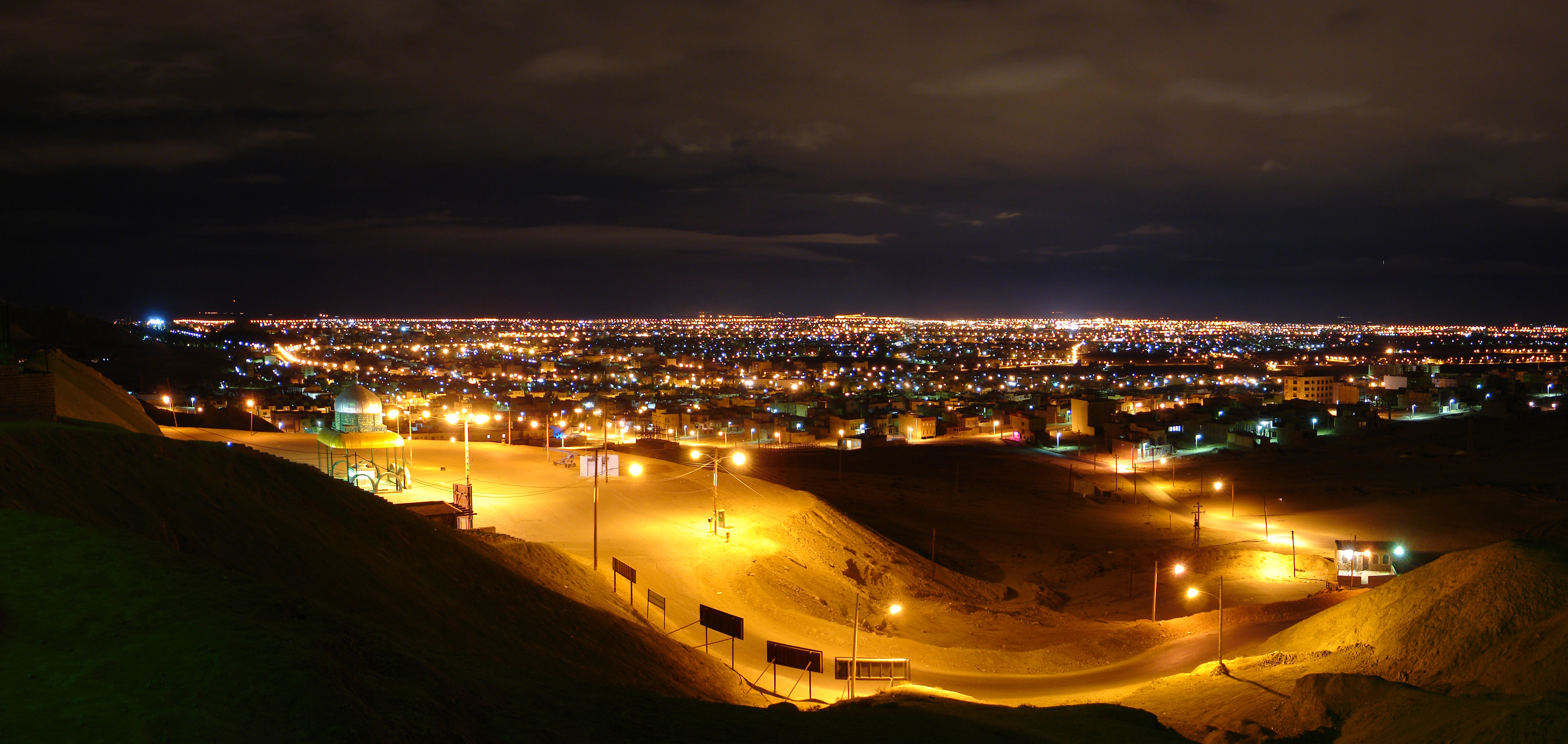

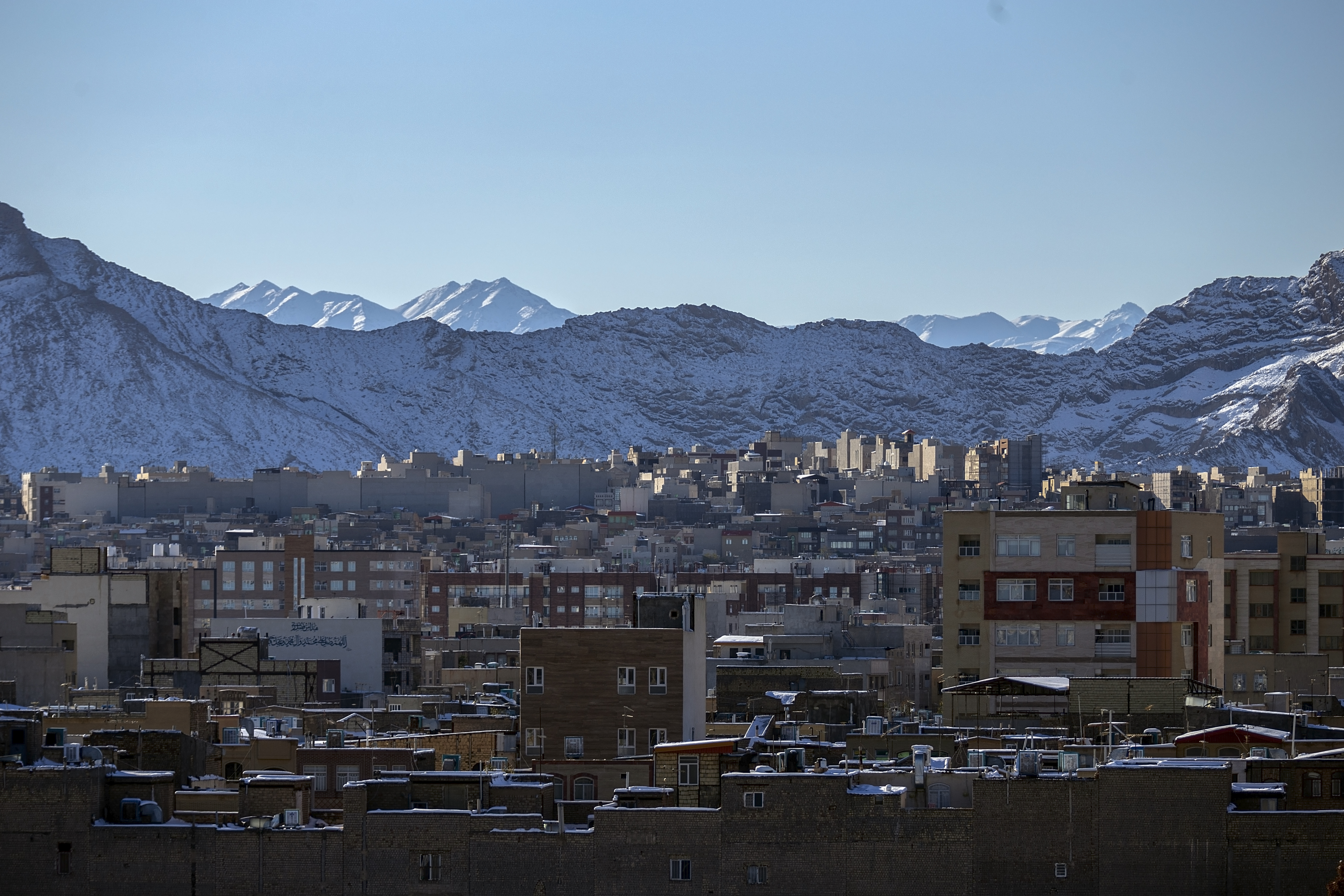

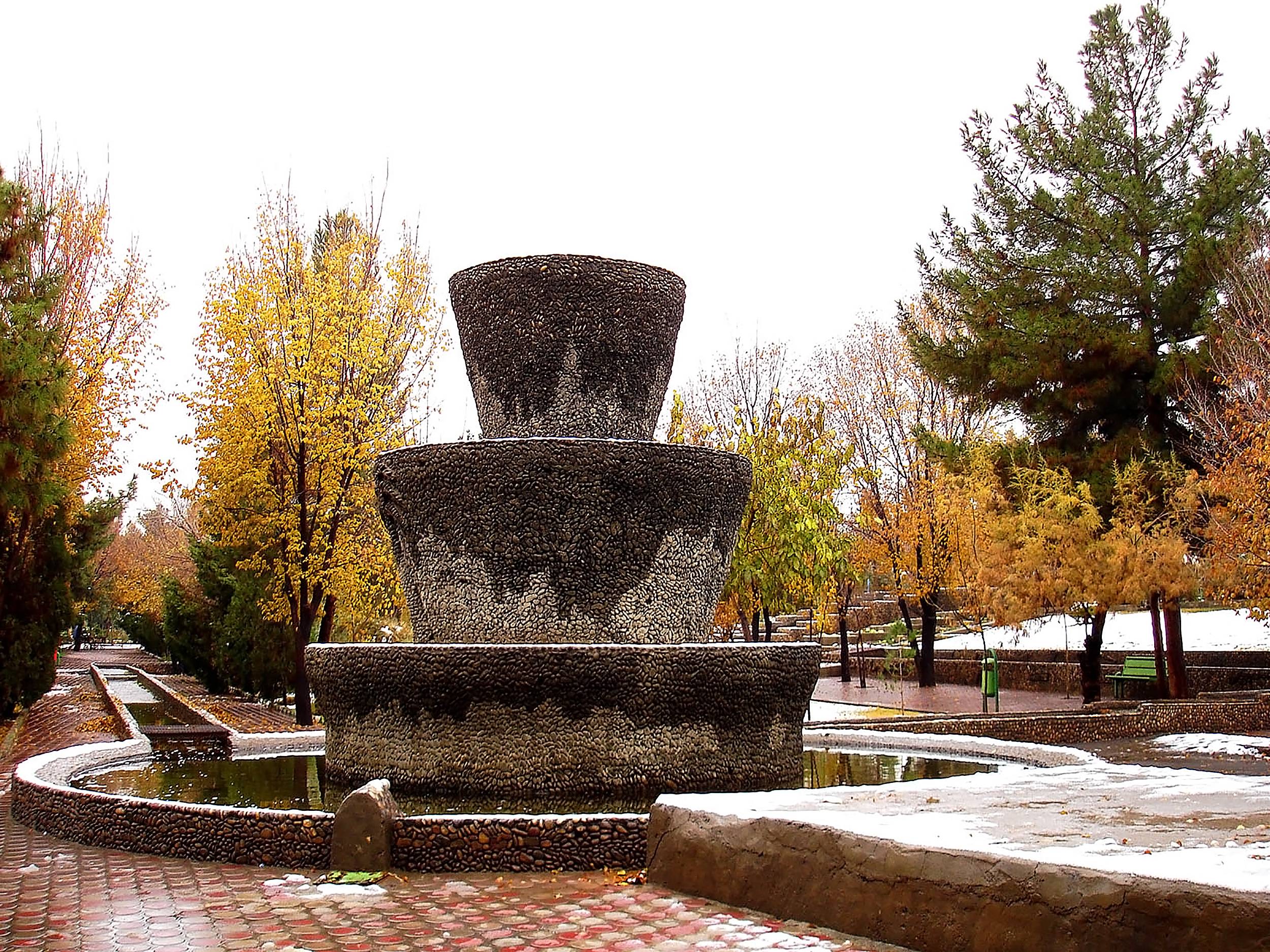
Bonyadi Park

== See also ==
- Timeline of Qom
- Fatima al-Masumeh Shrine
- Iranian architecture
- University of Qom
- Qom Seminary
- Qom rug
- Pardisan City

== Bibliography ==
- Balāḏori
- Drechsler
- Frye
- Ghirshman
- Hakemi
- Kleiss
- Modarresi Ṭabāṭabāʾi
- Najāši
- Qomi
- Schippmann
