= Navvab =

Navvab may refer to:

== Places ==
- Navvab (district), a locality in Tehran, Iran
  - Shahid Navvab-e Safavi Metro Station
- Navvab Expressway, a highway in Tehran, Iran

== People ==
- Ali-Akbar Navvab Shirazi (1773–1847), Iranian scholar, poet and calligrapher
- Ásíyih Khánum (1820–1886), Bahá'u'lláh's first wife
- Navvab Safavi (1924–1955), Iranian Shia cleric; founder of Fada'iyan-e Islam
- Mir Mohsun Navvab (1833–1918), Azerbaijani poet and artist
- Seyyed Abolhasan Navvab (born 1958), Iranian professor and cleric

== See also ==
- Nawabganj (disambiguation)
- Nabob (disambiguation)
- Nabab (disambiguation)
- Chhote Nawab (disambiguation)
- Majlis al-Nuwwab (disambiguation)
- Navab, a surname
- Nawab, a South Asian royal title
