= Nawabganj =

Nawabganj may refer to:

== Bangladesh ==
- Chapai Nawabganj, administrative centre of Chapai Nawabganj District, Bangladesh
- Chapai Nawabganj District, district of Rajshahi Division
- Nawabganj Upazila (disambiguation)
  - Nawabganj Upazila, Dhaka
  - Nawabganj Upazila, Dinajpur

== India ==
=== Uttar Pradesh ===
- Nawabganj, Barabanki, a city and tehsil
  - Nawabganj, Bara Banki Assembly constituency, Uttar Pradesh Legislative Assembly (defunct)
- Nawabganj, Bareilly, town
  - Nawabganj Assembly constituency, Uttar Pradesh Legislative Assembly
- Nawabganj, Gonda, town
- Nawabganj, Unnao, city
  - Nawabganj Bird Sanctuary, Unnao District
- Nawabganj, Allahabad Assembly constituency, Uttar Pradesh Legislative Assembly (defunct)

=== West Bengal ===
- Nawabganj, North 24 Parganas, neighbourhood of North Barrackpur, West Bengal, India

== See also ==
- Navvab (disambiguation)
- Ganj (disambiguation)
