= Navabi =

Navabi (Persian: نوابی; adjective form of نواب [navāb] meaning "nabob", "nawab" – and thus roughly translating as "of Navab", "from a nabob [rich Mughal ruler]", "relating to a nabob") is a Persian surname. Notable people with the surname include:

- Armin Navabi (born 1983), Iranian-Canadian ex-Muslim atheist and secular activist, author and podcaster
- Hakan Massoud Navabi (born 1990), Afghan-Canadian freelance journalist, writer and entrepreneur
- Shirin Navabi (born 1980), Iranian female chess player

== Fictional character ==
- Samar Navabi, character from the American crime drama television series The Blacklist

== See also ==
- Navab
- Nowjeh Deh, Tabriz, also called Navabi, village in Tazeh Kand Rural District, Khosrowshahr District, Tabriz County, East Azerbaijan Province, Iran
