= Nawabganj, Unnao =

Nawabganj
- Nagar panchayat
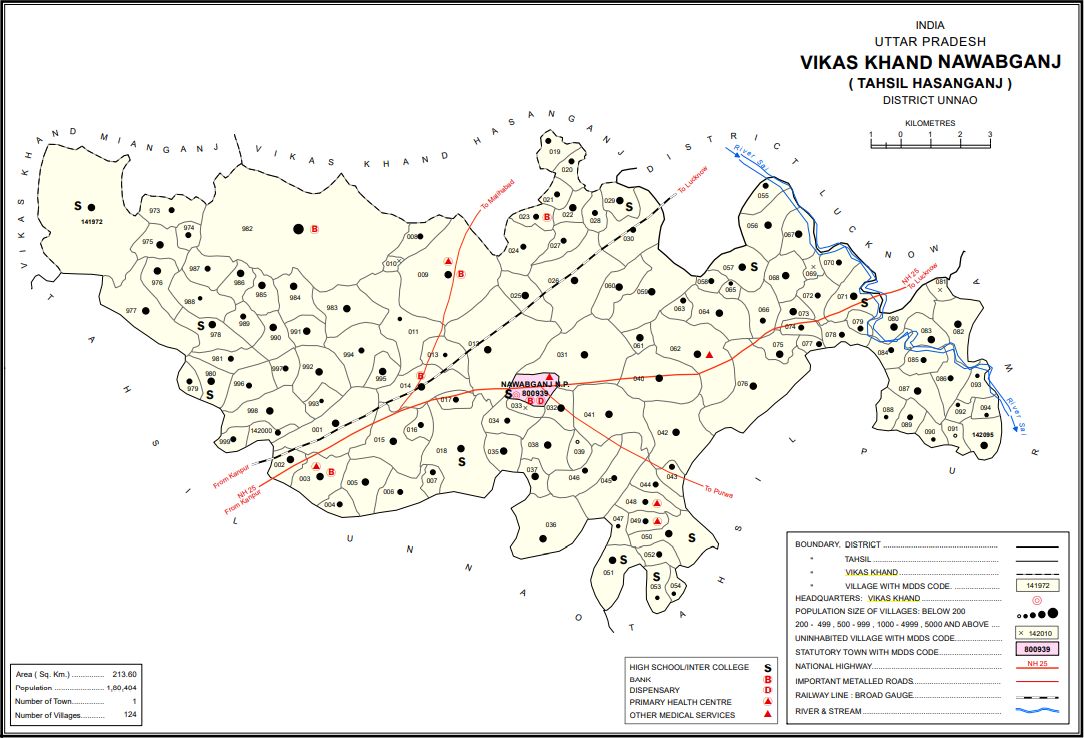
- Map of Nawabganj CD block

- Location in Uttar Pradesh, India
- Coordinates: 26.6210°N 80.6683°E
- Country: India
- State: Uttar Pradesh
- District: Unnao
- Established: 1842

Area
  - Total: 1.62 km^{2} (0.63 sq mi)
- Elevation: 93 m (305 ft)

Population (2011)
  - Total: 11,545
  - Density: 7,130/km^{2} (18,500/sq mi)

Languages
  - Official: Hindi
- Time zone: UTC+5:30 (IST)
- PIN: 209859
- Vehicle registration: UP-35
- Website: Npnawabganj.com

Nawabganj is a town and nagar panchayat in Hasanganj tehsil of Unnao district, Uttar Pradesh, India. It is located northeast of Unnao on the Lucknow-Kanpur road, near the Ajgain railway station. Founded in 1842 and first officially classified as a town for the 1981 census, Nawabganj once served as the seat of a tehsil under the Nawabs of Awadh and is today the headquarters of a community development block containing 124 villages.

Nawabganj is the site of Nawabganj Bird Sanctuary, which was established in 1984 at the site of a local lake. Designated as a protected Ramsar site since September 2019, the sanctuary is home to over 25,000 birds (including both resident and migratory populations) across some 220 species. Among the species present are the endangered Egyptian vulture and Pallas's fish eagle, as well as the vulnerable lesser adjutant and woolly-necked stork. Additionally, the sanctuary is home to larger mammals including the golden jackal and the jungle cat.

Nawabganj hosts a large annual fair at the end of Chait in honour of the goddesses Durga Devi and Kusahri Devi. The fair is one of the largest in the district, drawing visitors from Lucknow and Kanpur. The Durga temple is in Nawabganj, while the Kusahri temple is in the neighbouring village of Kusumbhi to the north. Major products manufactured in Nawabganj include fireworks, jaggery, and sweets. As of 2011, the town's population is 11,545, in 1,985 households.

== History ==
Nawabganj was founded in 1842 by Amin-ud-Daulah, the prime minister of Oudh State, who also built a sarai and mosque here. Naubat Rai, the state's treasurer, was responsible for the construction of the tank. Under the Nawabs of Awadh, Nawabganj was the seat of a tehsil and also had a thana, but it declined in importance after the tehsil was relocated and the population shrank as a result: it was 3,123 in 1869, but by 1891 it had fallen to 2,840. The 1901 census recorded a population of 2,789, including a Muslim minority of about one-sixth of the total.

== Demographics ==
Historical population
Year	Pop.	±%
1981	5,597	—
1991	7,691	+37.4%
2001	9,840	+27.9%
2011	11,545	+17.3%
Source: 2011 Census of India

According to the 2011 census, Nawabganj has a population of 11,545 people, in 1,985 households. The town's sex ratio is 934 females to every 1000 males; 5,968 of Nawabganj's residents are male (51.7%) and 5,577 are female (48.3%). The 0-6 age group makes up about 12.7% of the town's population; among this group, the sex ratio is 964, which is higher than the district urban average of 903. Members of Scheduled Castes make up 23.55% of the town's population and members of Scheduled Tribes make up 1.22%. The proportion of scheduled tribes in Nawabganj is the highest among towns in Unnao district. The town's literacy rate was 70.6% (counting only people age 7 and up); literacy was higher among men and boys (75.2%) than among women and girls (65.6%). The corresponding gap of 17.3% was the highest among towns in the district. The scheduled castes literacy rate is 57.2% (63.5% among men and boys, and 50.7% among women and girls).

In terms of employment, 25.2% of Nawabganj residents were classified as main workers (i.e. people employed for at least 6 months per year) in 2011. Marginal workers (i.e. people employed for less than 6 months per year) made up 3.1%, and the remaining 71.7% were non-workers. Employment status varied substantially according to gender, with 49.8% of men being either main or marginal workers, compared to only 5.3% of women.

== Transport ==
The train station is at the nearby village of Kusambi, 1.5 km north of Nawabganj. There are 7.4 km of roads in the town, and it is connected by bus routes with other towns.

== Communications ==
Nawabganj's PIN code is 209859 and its postal head office is Nawabganj (Unnao).

== Tourism ==
Nawabganj Bird Sanctuary, a bird sanctuary (chandra shekhar azad) and nature reserve, is located near the town. Shri Durga Mata temple is located in the town. Shri Kushahari Mata temple is 3 k.m. away from the town near kusumbhi railway station.

== Villages ==
Nawabganj CD block has the following 124 villages:

Village name	Total land area (hectares)	Population (in 2011)
Birsingh Pur	1.3	6,190
Shahpur	180	739
Bhademoo	121	938
Raipur Gadhi	61.5	1,886
Dilwal	57.1	1,337
Birsindhi Maletha	443.5	2,215
Nana Tikur	190.8	1,817
Athari	65.8	583
Piprosa	145.9	1,170
Sindhuriya	137.4	608
Bhaoli	0	11,171
Jansar	781.5	4,573
Dariyapur	180	1,606
Baharuddeen Pur	138.5	1,283
Sadhira	226.1	1,812
Jalal	117.4	614
Jatkherwa	91.9	447
Pakri Gawan	115	629
Ajijpur	156.3	1,158
Rainapur	155.2	1,250
Itkuti	249.2	1,574
Teliyani	84.8	422
Shekhpur	106.1	502
Mahatwani	80	1,042
Mundera	184.1	769
Dahraoli	87.2	919
Saraosa	301	1,376
Ajaiya Khera	102.2	792
Kasanda	83.4	629
Jagdeeshpur	507.7	2,762
Bichpri	108.5	2,104
Chamaraoli	278.2	3,731
Rahamatpur	39.9	784
Pali	364.4	1,480
Chilaola	22.5	828
Sewara	77.4	785
Marocha	139.2	594
Makur	841.1	4,306
Chak Aima	19.8	0
Amramau	140.1	222
Kushumbhi	902.5	5,453
Ajgain	324.4	8,296
Malaon	428.9	3,878
Baruwa	121.7	769
Khwajgipur	64.2	583
Kewana	650.8	4,246
Salonepur	86.2	567
Gauri	92.7	873
Dewara	107	503
Sarai Indal	119.9	1,083
Korara	119.9	875
Kharehra	200.1	700
Kunjpur	185.8	1,434
Gaora Katherua	0	2,624
Sikunderpur	114.9	735
Tikwamau	101.5	696
Jaitipur	134.1	5,150
Rampur	101.6	796
Makhdoompur	527.2	1,114
Amretha	138.8	1,086
Pachiyanw	256	0
Ravanhar	125.2	907
Etbarpur	171.5	1,061
Sersa	452	2,321
Salempur	115.4	1,173
Madoo Khera	220.7	1,419
Khajoori	84.6	189
Kushehri	62	1,569
Parsandan	678.7	3,946
Sarai Joga	42.4	3,023
Jahangeerabad	83.2	900
Barela	164.1	875
Pirhri	118	578
Bhitrepar	158.9	862
Baheriya Bujurg	112.9	348
Kateharo	88.7	934
Baheriya Khurd	156.4	833
Paithar	296	1,598
Marwai Naimpur	264	1,545
Gokulpur	93	684
Devipur	56.3	491
Jagdeesh Pur	125.8	437
Mohammad Pur	135.7	894
Nadauha	184.9	1,105
Rudrawara	167.7	1,403
Kapoor Khera	69.4	724
Himmat Garh	388.4	2,663
Raipur Khelamao	183.6	1,449
Mauhari	149.5	1,207
Ashakhera	216.5	4,950
Bichpari	0	583
Bhainsora	0	2,021
Dhakhiya	43.8	342
Mirjapur	134.2	980
Arjunamau	146	1,923
Saroti	195.4	1,264
Shahampur	36.8	0
Nibahari Kalyanpur	121.9	794
Bajeharo	231.8	1,198
Matiyamao	99	754
Soharamao	122.4	2,181
Lalpur	165.8	793
Rasulpur	67.1	1,326
Mahnora	613	2,857
Chak Sohramao	29.9	662
Hasnapur	105.5	917
Hinora	61.2	508
Tendewa Heera Kuddi	199.1	1,672
Banduwa	33.2	0
Balhaumao	232.2	1,228
Shekhpur	158.5	1,250
Patkapur	124.6	672
Kakraha Pathraha	96.8	719
Kotwan	155.8	883
Ranipur	178.6	1,525
Devaya Mavaya	93.7	302
Paraura	99.8	572
Wajidpur	64.4	457
Majhgawan	49.7	1
Naugawan	58.1	347
Salarpur	107.1	374
Dhanni Khera	102.4	486
Gaurenda	129.8	1,291
