= Pardisan City =

Pardisan پردیسان
- neighbourhood
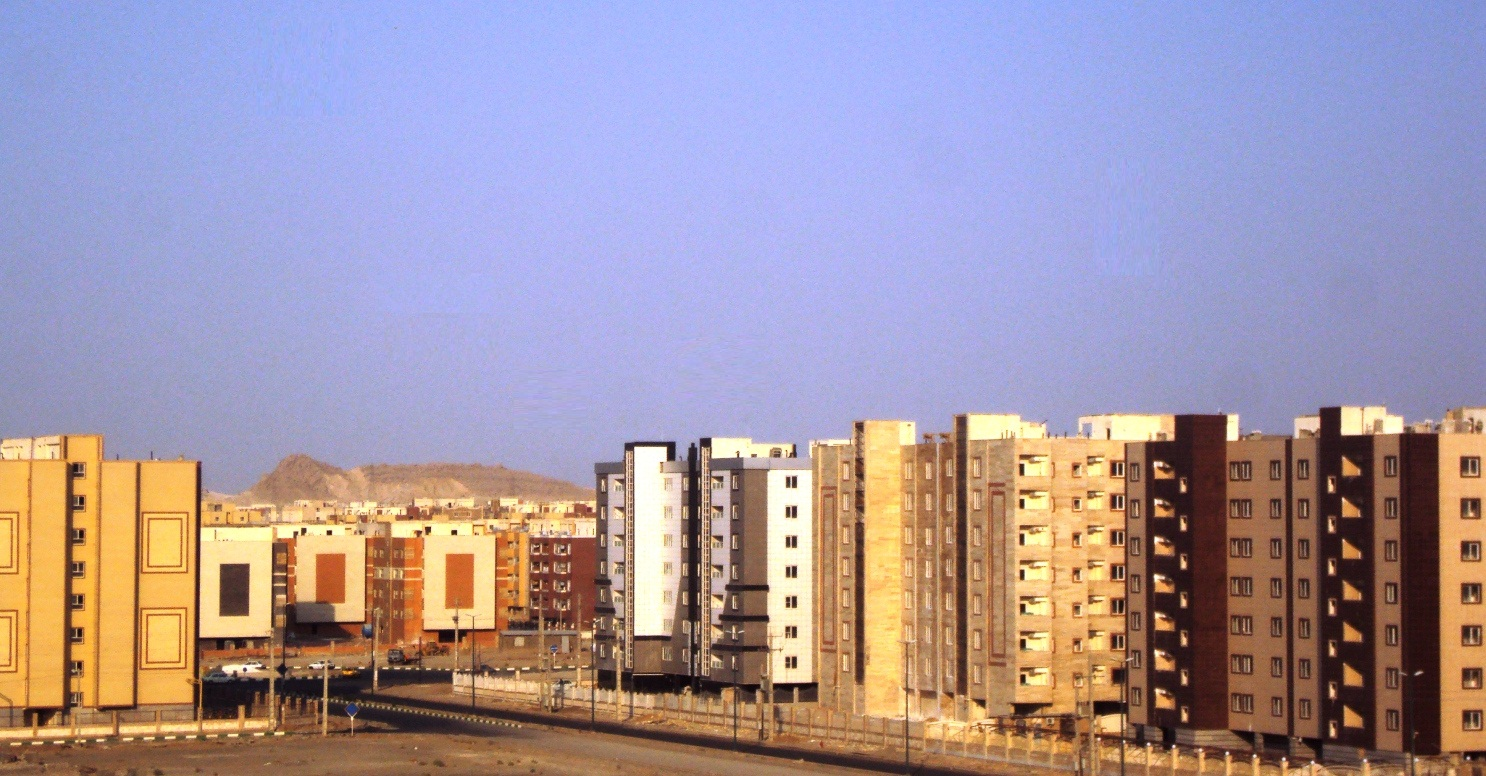
- View of Pardisan

- Location within Iran
- Coordinates: 34°38′24″N 50°52′35″E
- Country: Iran
- Province: Qom
- County: Qom
- Bakhsh: Central

Population (2012)
  - Total: 100,000
- Time zone: UTC+3:30 (IRST)

Pardisan (Persian: پردیسان) is a neighbourhood in south of Qom, in Iran. It has a population of 100,000.

A major part of Pardisan's population are clerics of Islamic Seminary who inhabited Pardisan following the mass-building program managed by the Center for Services for Islamic Seminaries (CSIS) during two decades.

Pardisan City is considered the academic region of Qom in which many universities and academic institutes are located, such as the Islamic Azad University, University of Religions and Denominations (URD), Qom Campus of Tehran University, Payame Noor University, Research Institute of Hawzah and University, Research Institute of Shi'a Studies, and Qom Human Sciences and Technology Park

In the context of the 2026 Iran war, six people were killed in an airstrike on three buildings on March 26, 2026 according to the Turkish Anadolu Agency, although the Canadian Broadcasting Corporation suggested the strike "killed at least 15 people and injured 10 others."

== Image Gallery ==
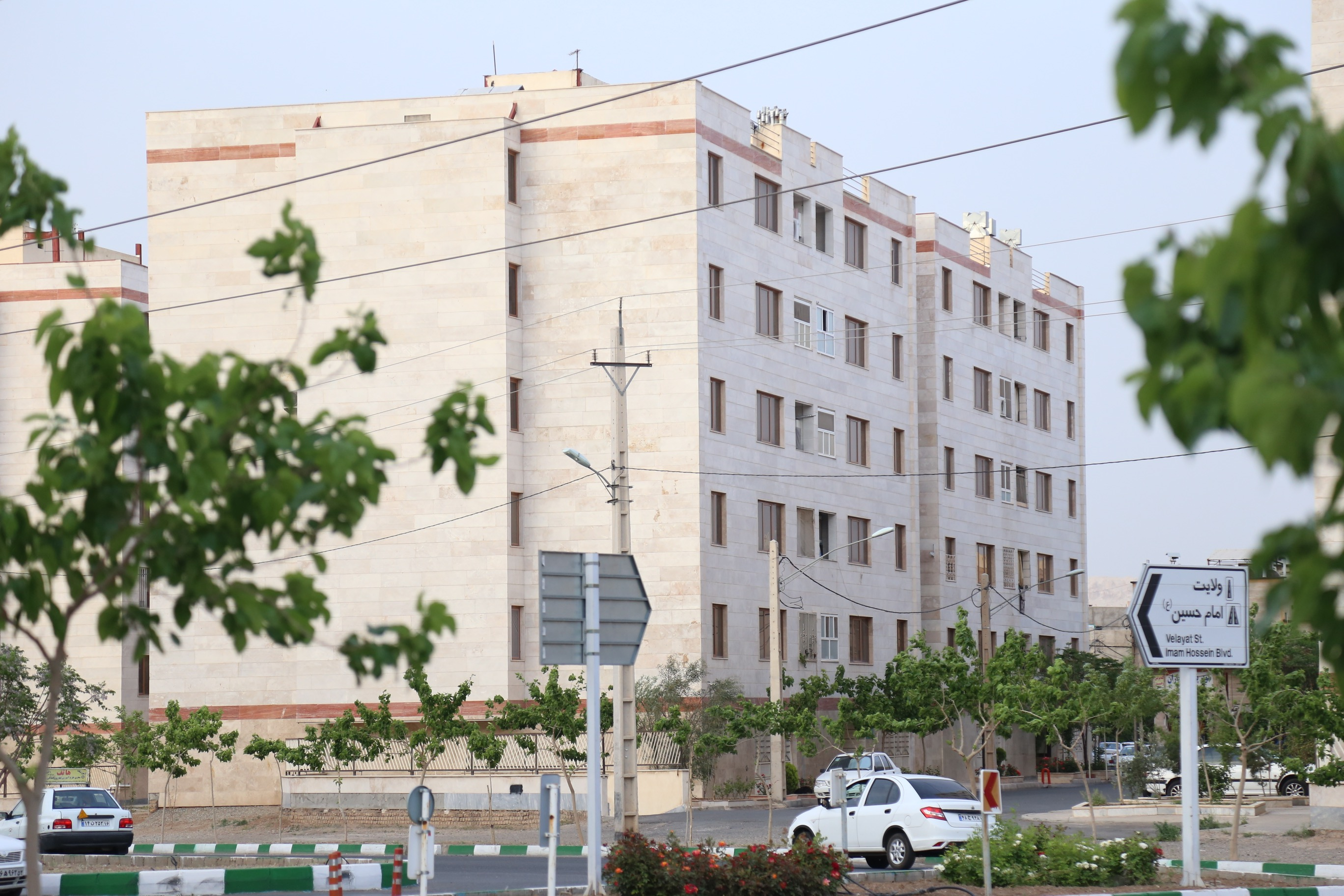
Golestan Buildings, Pardisan, Qom, Iran

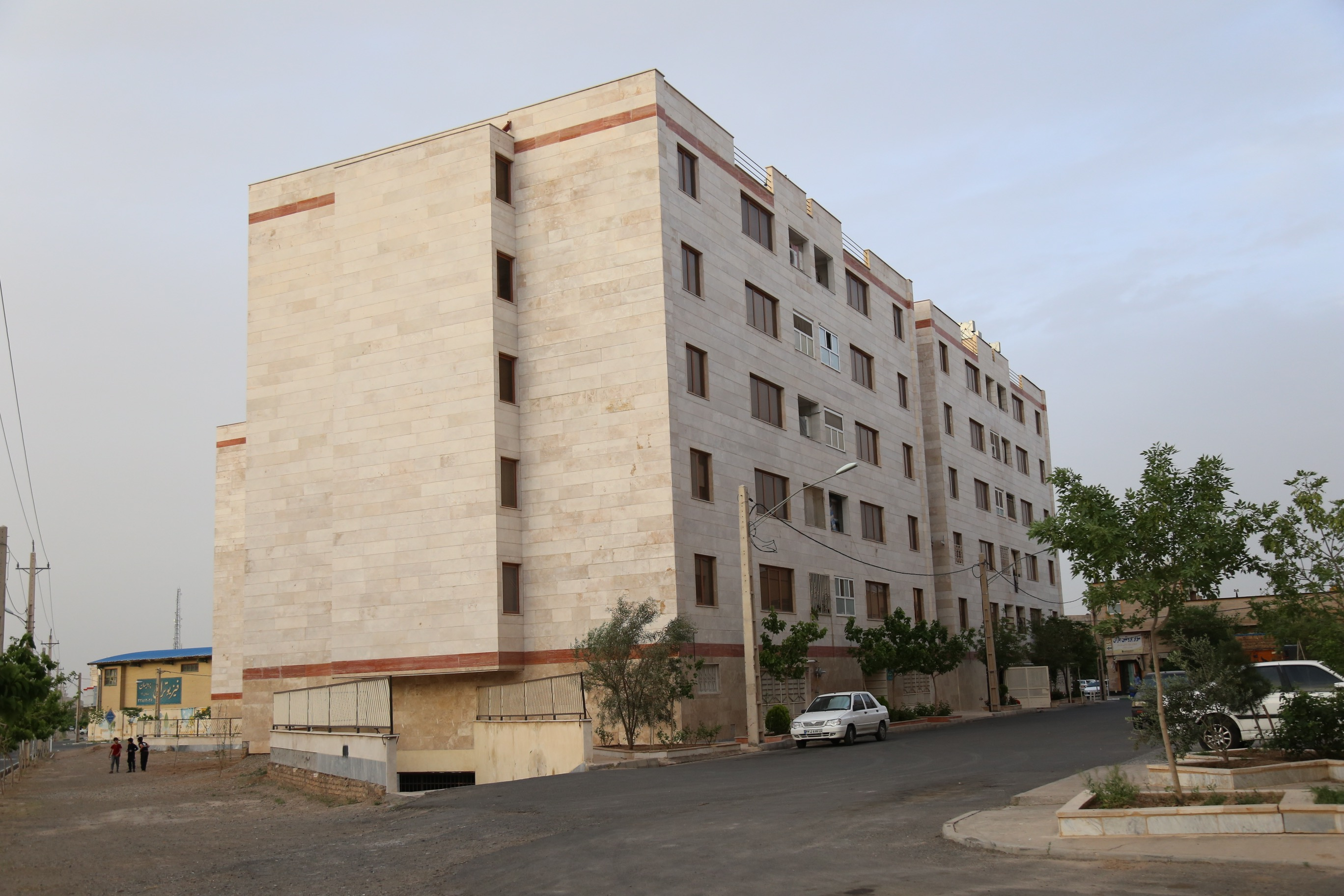
Golestan Buildings, Pardisan, Qom, Iran
