= The Little Master =

The Little Master may refer to:

== Literature ==
- The Little Master, an 1886 novel by J. T. Trowbridge
- The Little Master, a 1913 children's novel by Laura E. Richards
- The Little Masters, a 1969 novel by Christian Walford
- Little Masters, a 1996 novel by Damien Wilkins

== People ==
- Clive Churchill (1927–1985), Australian rugby league footballer and coach
- Sachin Tendulkar (born 1973), Indian cricketer
- Hanif Mohammad (1934–2016), Pakistani cricketer
- Sunil Gavaskar (born 1949), Indian cricketer
- Gary Ablett Jr. (born 1984), Australian rules footballer
- Remco Evenepoel (born 2000), Belgian cyclist

== Other uses ==
- Little Masters ("Kleinmeister"), a group of 16th German artists in engraving
- Little Masters (Greek vase painting), a group of potters and vase painters active in Athens approximately 560 — 530 BC

== See also ==
- Little mester, a self-employed worker who rents space in a factory or works from their own workshop
- Chhote Nawab (disambiguation) (lit. 'Little Master'), various Indian films so titled
