= Nabob (disambiguation) =

A nabob, an English form of "nawab", is a merchant-leader of high social status and wealth.

Nabob may also refer to:

- Nabob (coffee), a brand of coffee in Canada
- HMS Nabob (D77), a Bogue-class escort aircraft carrier
- Nabob, Wisconsin, an unincorporated community
- Nawab, the provincial governor or viceroy in the Mughal empire
- The Nabob, a play by the 18th-century English playwright Samuel Foote.

== See also ==
- Nabab (disambiguation)
- Navvab (disambiguation)
