= Jhalotar =

- Village
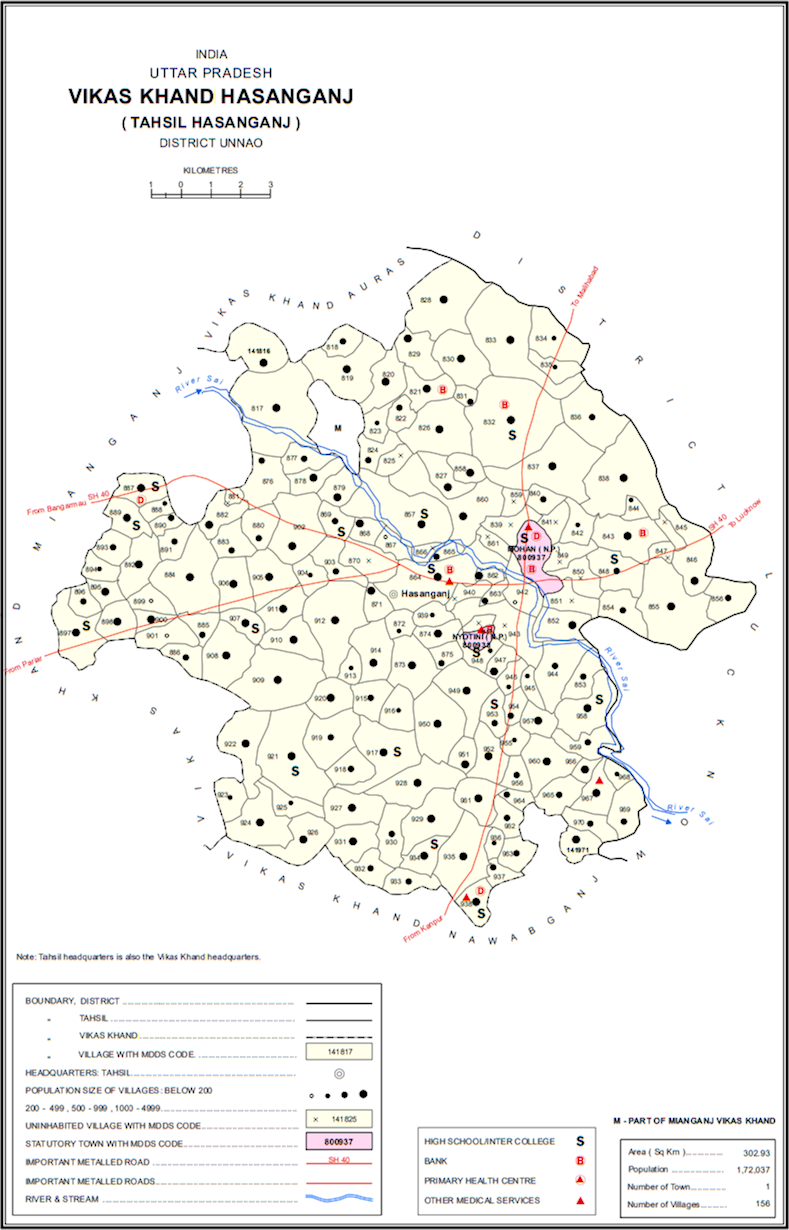
- Map showing Jhalotar (#934) in Hasanganj CD block

- Location in Uttar Pradesh, India
- Coordinates: 26°41′26″N 80°38′12″E
- Country India: India
- State: Uttar Pradesh
- District: Unnao

Area
  - Total: 1.777 km^{2} (0.686 sq mi)

Population (2011)
  - Total: 1,990
  - Density: 1,120/km^{2} (2,900/sq mi)

Languages
  - Official: Hindi
- Time zone: UTC+5:30 (IST)
- Vehicle registration: UP-35

Jhalotar is a village in Hasanganj block of Unnao district, Uttar Pradesh, India. It is located just to the west of the Mohan-Ajgain road, near a lake called Kundra Samundar. It hosts a weekly haat and has one primary school and no healthcare facilities. Drinking water is provided by hand pump. As of 2011, the population of the village is 1,990, in 319 households.

== History ==
According to tradition, the spot now occupied by Jhalotar was once a dhak jungle where a faqir named Mushtaq Shah lived. A Chamar man also built a house nearby, made a clearing, and started a village called "Jhali" here; the name later became Jhalotar. Jhalotar is listed in the Ain-i-Akbari as the seat of a pargana, and at some point the Subahdar of Awadh built a fort here. In 1770, Beni Bahadur Kayasth, the minister of the Nawab of Awadh, was granted a jagir in the Jhalotar pargana, which was split off to become a new pargana based at Ajgain. The two parganas were merged again under the British Raj. At the turn of the 20th century, Jhalotar was described as a small village with a population of 682. It hosted a small market once per week.

The 1961 census recorded Jhalotar as comprising 1 hamlet, with a total population of 854 (445 male and 409 female), in 164 households and 153 physical houses. The area of the village was given as 432 acres.
