= Hasnapur =

Hasnapur Hasnāpur
- Village
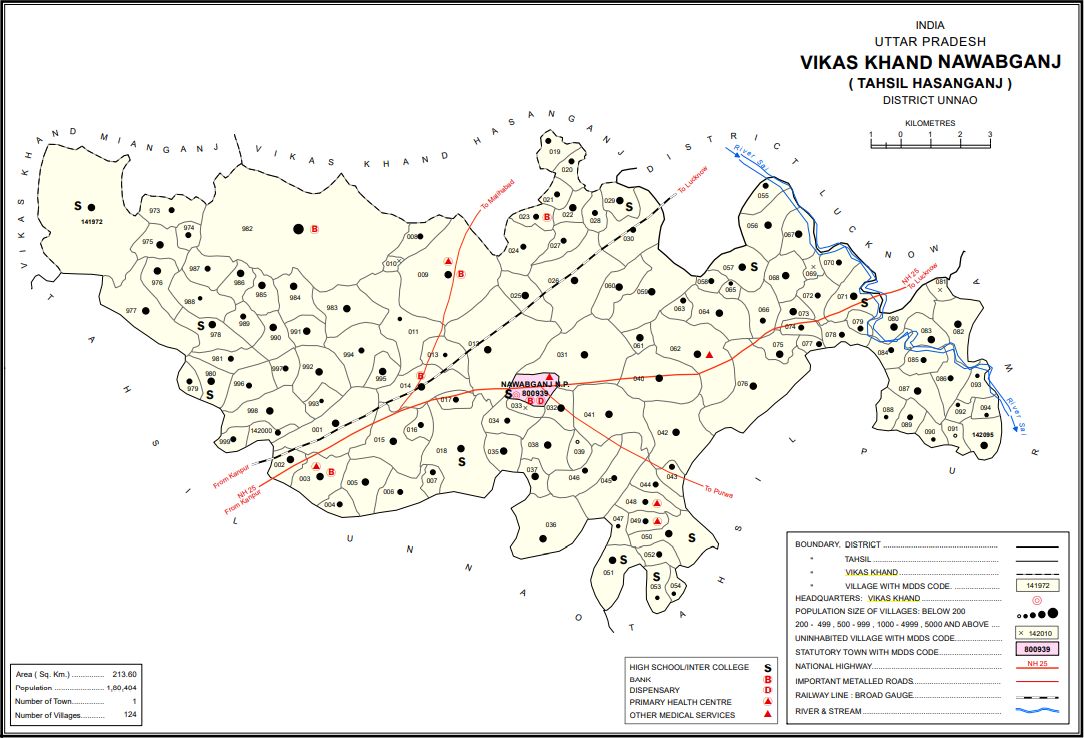
- Map showing Hasnapur (#078) in Nawabganj CD block

- Location in Uttar Pradesh, India
- Coordinates: 26.637469°N 80.784236°E
- Country India: India
- State: Uttar Pradesh
- District: Unnao

Area
  - Total: 1.055 km^{2} (0.407 sq mi)

Population (2011)
  - Total: 917
  - Density: 869/km^{2} (2,250/sq mi)

Languages
  - Official: Hindi
- Time zone: UTC+5:30 (IST)
- Vehicle registration: UP-35

Hasnapur is a village in Nawabganj block of Unnao district, Uttar Pradesh, India. As of 2011, its population is 917, in 159 households, and it has a pre-primary school and no healthcare facilities.

The 1961 census recorded Hasnapur as comprising 4 hamlets, with a total population of 296 (167 male and 129 female), in 60 households and 53 physical houses. The area of the village was given as 275 acres.
