= Navab =

Navab is a surname. Notable people with the surname include:

- Abulhassan Navab (born 1958), Iranian cleric
- Alex Navab (1965–2019), American financier
- Farhan Navab (born 1956), Iranian sprinter
- Hossein Navab (1897–1972), Iranian diplomat

== See also ==
- Nawab
- Navvab (disambiguation)
