= Rasulpur, Nawabganj =

Rasulpur Rasūlpur
- Village
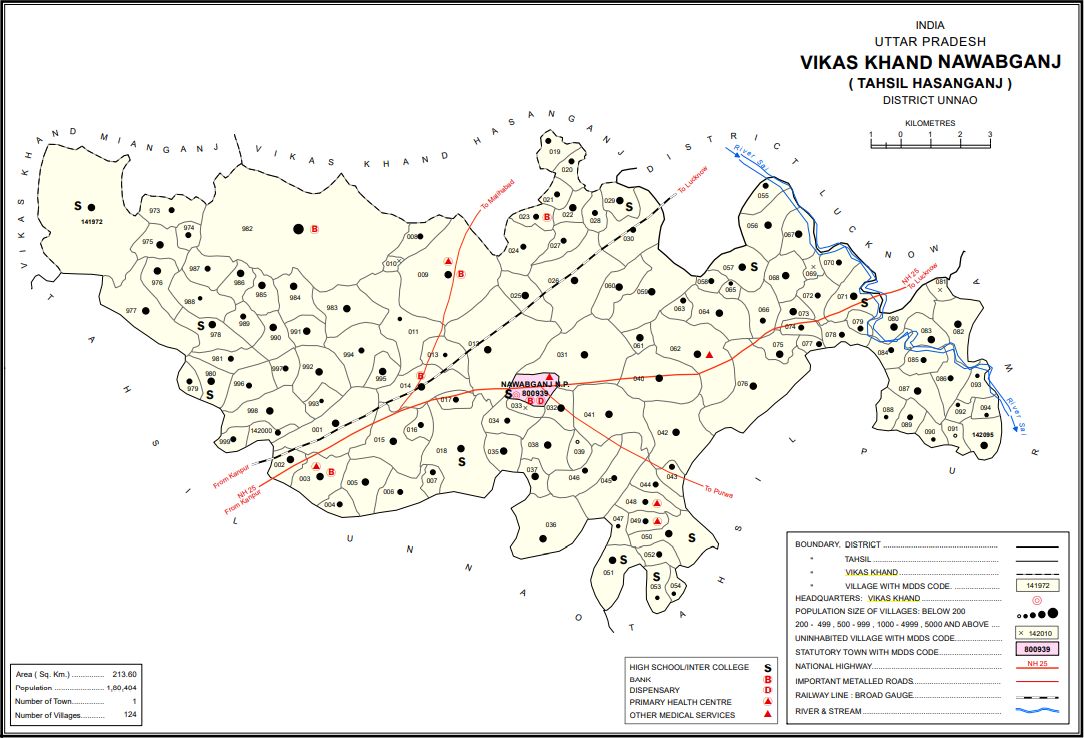
- Map showing Rasulpur (#075) in Nawabganj CD block

- Location in Uttar Pradesh, India
- Coordinates: 26.635645°N 80.754348°E
- Country India: India
- State: Uttar Pradesh
- District: Unnao

Area
  - Total: 0.671 km^{2} (0.259 sq mi)

Population (2011)
  - Total: 1,326
  - Density: 1,980/km^{2} (5,120/sq mi)

Languages
  - Official: Hindi
- Time zone: UTC+5:30 (IST)
- Vehicle registration: UP-35

Rasulpur is a village in Nawabganj block of Unnao district, Uttar Pradesh, India. As of 2011, its population is 1,326, in 221 households, and it has no schools or healthcare facilities.

The 1961 census recorded Rasulpur as comprising 2 hamlets, with a total population of 503 (264 male and 239 female), in 105 households and 90 physical houses. The area of the village was given as 411 acres.
