= Nabab (disambiguation) =

Nabab is a 2017 Indian-Bangladeshi film starring Shakib Khan.

Nabab may also refer to:

- Nabab Nandini (film), a 2007 Indian Bengali-language film
- Nabab LLB, a 2020 Bangladeshi film, starring Shakib Khan
- Le nabab, an 1853 opéra comique by Fromental Halévy
- Livio Nabab (born 1988), Guadeloupe football player

== See also ==
- Nabob (disambiguation)
- Navvab (disambiguation)
