= Chhote Nawab (disambiguation) =

Chhote Nawab or Chote Nawab (lit. 'Little Master') may refer to:

- Chhote Nawab, a 1961 Indian film by S. A. Akbar
- Chotay Nawab, a 1980 Pakistani film by Iqbal Akhtar
- Chote Nawab, a 2024 Indian film by Kumud Chaudhary

== See also ==
- Navvab (disambiguation)
- Chhote Sarkar (disambiguation)
- Little master (disambiguation)
