= Arjunamau =

- Village
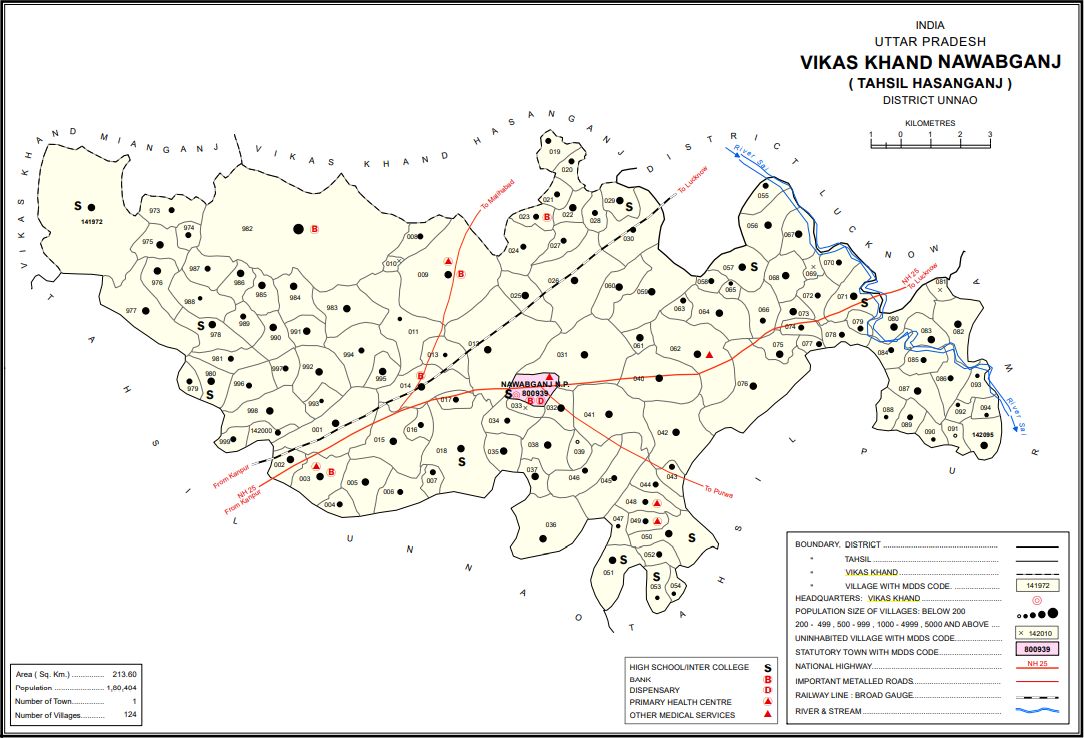
- Map showing Arjunamau (#067) in Nawabganj CD block

- Location in Uttar Pradesh, India
- Coordinates: 26.669187°N 80.760629°E
- Country India: India
- State: Uttar Pradesh
- District: Unnao

Area
  - Total: 1.46 km^{2} (0.56 sq mi)

Population (2011)
  - Total: 1,923
  - Density: 1,320/km^{2} (3,410/sq mi)

Languages
  - Official: Hindi
- Time zone: UTC+5:30 (IST)
- Vehicle registration: UP-35

Arjunamau is a village in Nawabganj block of Unnao district, Uttar Pradesh, India. As of 2011, its population is 1,923, in 364 households, and it has one primary school and no healthcare facilities.

The 1961 census recorded Arjunamau as comprising 5 hamlets, with a total population of 858 (444 male and 414 female), in 129 households and 109 physical houses. The area of the village was given as 365 acres.
