= Nawabganj Upazila =

There are two sub districts called Nawabganj Upazila in Bangladesh:

- Nawabganj Upazila, Dhaka
- Nawabganj Upazila, Dinajpur

== See also ==
- Nawabganj (disambiguation)
- Nawabganj Sadar Upazila in Nawabganj district of Rajshahi division
