= Ajgain =

- Village
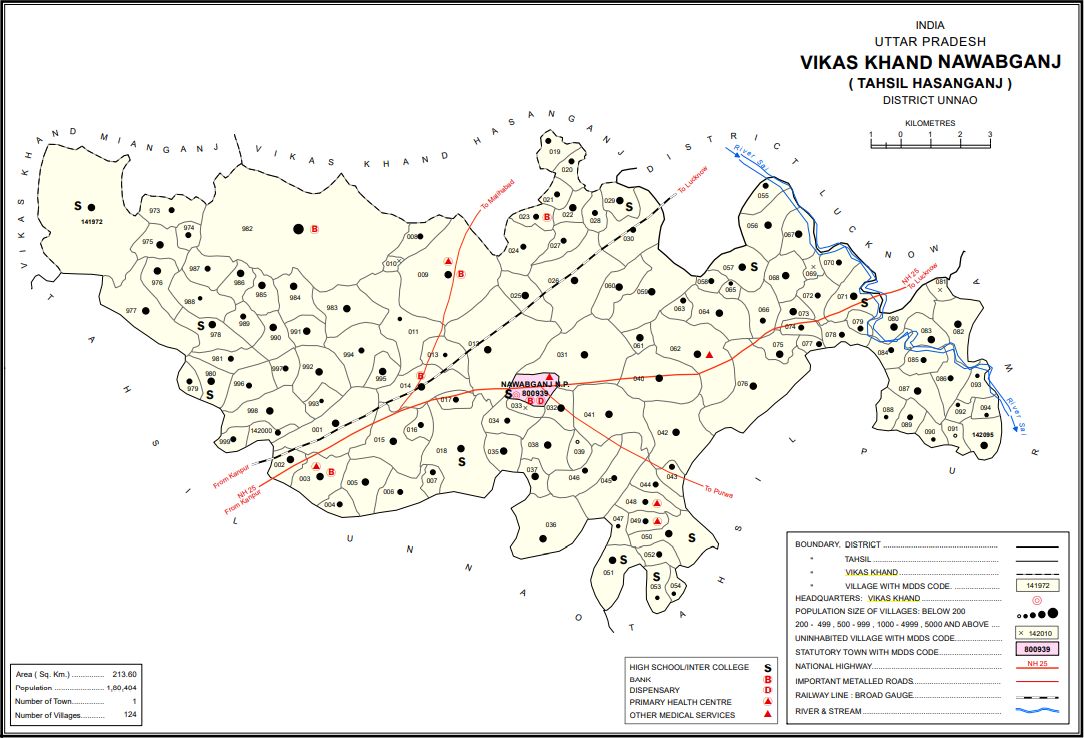
- Map showing Ajgain (#014) in Nawabganj CD block

- Location in Uttar Pradesh, India
- Coordinates: 26.619277°N 80.62869°E
- Country India: India
- State: Uttar Pradesh
- District: Unnao

Area
  - Total: 3.244 km^{2} (1.253 sq mi)

Population (2011)
  - Total: 8,926
  - Density: 2,752/km^{2} (7,126/sq mi)

Languages
  - Official: Hindi
- Time zone: UTC+5:30 (IST)
- Vehicle registration: UP-35

Ajgain is a village in Nawabganj block of Unnao district, Uttar Pradesh, India. It is located northeast of Unnao, near the main Lucknow-Kanpur road. It has a railway station on the Lucknow-Kanpur line, lying between Sonik and Kusumbhi. It holds a market on Mondays and Fridays, with grain and vegetables being the main items of trade. As of 2011, the population of Ajgain is 8,926, in 1,481 households.

== History ==
Ajgain was originally called Bhanpara after its founder Bhan Singh, who was a Dikhit. It was renamed at the behest of an astrologer to be more auspicious; the present name is derived from Aja, a name of Brahma the creator. Ajgaon was made the headquarters of a pargana after Beni Bahadur Kayasth, the chief minister of Shuja-ud-Daula, was granted a jagir in the existing pargana of Jhalotar in 1770. The two parganas were rejoined upon the British annexation of Oudh State in the 1850s, and from then on the combined pargana bore the name Jhalotar-Ajgain.

At the turn of the 20th century, Ajgain was described as a large village, with a population of 2,431 people in 1901. It had a train station by then, to the northwest of the village, and it also had a police thana and an upper primary school with about 70 students.

The 1961 census recorded Ajgain as comprising 7 hamlets, with a total population of 2,612 (1,372 male and 1,240 female), in 511 households and 456 physical houses. The area of the village was given as 810 acres. It had a medical practitioner and a post office then. It had one grain mill, one small miscellaneous food processing establishment, and nine bicycle repair shops. Average attendance of the twice-weekly market was about 700 people. It had a police force consisting of 2 sub-inspectors, 1 head constable, and 15 constables at the time.
