= Seyyed Abolhasan Navvab =

Iranian professor/cleric (born 1958)

Dr. Seyyed Abolhasan Navvab
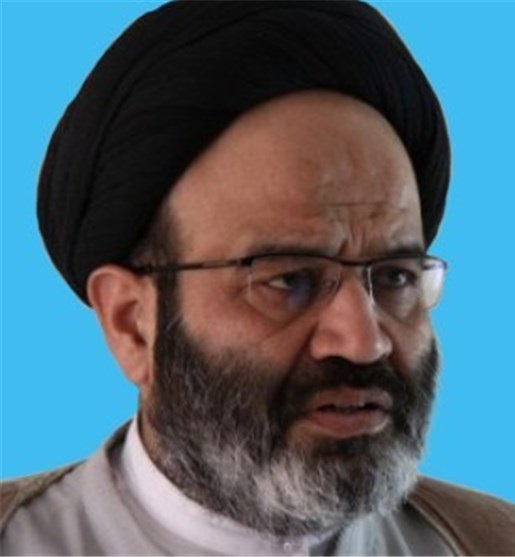

Former Chancellor of University of Religions and Denominations
- In office 12 December 1995 – ?
- Preceded by: Jafar Ebrahimi

Personal details
- Born: 1958 (age 67–68) Isfahan, Iran
- Party: Combatant Clergy Association
- Education: Haghani Circle

Seyyed Abolhasan Navvab (Persian: سید ابوالحسن نواب) (born 1958 in Shahreza, Isfahan) is an Iranian cleric. He was one of the candidates for the 2008 parliamentary election, but he was disqualified two months before the election.

Abolhasan Navvab's father was well-known in Shahreza. He entered the seminary after completing his primary education in 1971 and studied the 4th sciences of the Ahl al-Bayt (as) in the Haqqani School of Qom until the years of the victory of the Islamic Revolution. After that, he studied exegesis, philosophy, and modern sciences such as sociology at the “In the Path of Truth” Institute, and at the same time studied jurisprudence and principles in the lessons of the great verses: Sheikh Morteza Haerizizdi, Shebir Zanjani, Mazaheri, and Mirza Javad Tabrizi.

During his years of study, he taught Arabic literature, jurisprudence, principles, and Quranic sciences in various seminary schools, and continued to teach at high levels in Tehran seminaries until many years later.

With the beginning of the imposed war, he was often active on the battlefields of right against wrong and tried to persuade, encourage and guide the warriors. After the end of the 8-year war, by the decree of the Supreme Leader, Hafezullah Ta’ali took charge of the affairs of the clerics of the Islamic Revolutionary Guard Corps for four years.

Establishment and chairmanship of the Center for the Study and Research of Religions and Beliefs, which later became the University of Religions and Beliefs, management of the seminary service center, membership in the Board of Trustees of the Mustafa International Society, membership in the Supreme Council of the World Assembly of Ahl al-Bayt (AS) The Supreme Leader is one of their prominent responsibilities and activities.

== Executive jobs ==
Representation of the Supreme Leader in the logistics of the Islamic Revolutionary Guard Corps for 3 years (1361 to 1364).

Head of the Political Ideological Faculty of the Islamic Revolutionary Guard Corps in Qom for 4 years (1985-1988).

Responsible for the affairs of the clergy of the Islamic Revolutionary Guard Corps by order of the Supreme Leader for 4 years (1989 to the end of 1992).

Deputy Minister of International Affairs of the Islamic Propaganda Organization for 2 years (1993-1993).

Deputy Minister of Communications of the Islamic Culture and Communication Organization for 3 years (1995 to the end of 1997).

Vice President of the World Assembly of Ahl al-Bayt (AS) (from 1998 to the end of 2003).

Head of the seminary service center from 1997 to the end of 2010 with the approval of the Supreme Leader for 14 years.

Head of the Center for the Study and Research of Religions and Religions from 1994 to 2003.

Deputy Head of Imam Khomeini Educational and Research Institute (from 1993 to 2001).

Managing Director of Haft Aseman Magazine (since 1999).

Political deputy of the Society of Fighting Clergy since 1984.

Faculty Member of the University of Religions and Religions.

== Membership in councils ==
Member of the Press Jury for two terms.

Member of the Board of Directors of the Organization of Schools and Seminaries Abroad by the decree of the Supreme Leader – two terms.

Member of the board of the seminary service center since 1990 and for 5 terms with the approval of the Supreme Leader and chairman of the board of the center since 1989.

Member of the Board of Trustees of the Islamic Propaganda Organization by order of the Supreme Leader.

Founder and member of the Board of Trustees of the Center for the Study and Research of Religions and Beliefs from 1994 to 2003.

Member of the Supreme Council of the World Assembly of the Ahl al-Bayt (AS) since 2003 by the decree of the Supreme Leader.

Member of the High Headquarters of the Qom Seminary Emigration Plan since 2001 with the approval of the Office of the Supreme Leader until 1985.

Member of the Central Council of the Society of Fighting Clergy.

Member and deputy of the board of trustees of the prayer headquarters.

Chairman of the Board of Trustees of the University of Religions and Religions.

Member of the Board of Trustees of the Mustafa Society.

Member of the International Policy Council of the Office of the Leader.

Member of the Religious Policy Council of the Culture and Communication Organization.

Member of the Supreme Council of Approximation News Agency.

== Scientific-cultural activities ==
Participating in international conferences and present papers in countries He has traveled to.

Assistant Professor, Grade 7, University of Religions and Beliefs – Teaching in Tehran Universities – Approximation between religions and teaching at the undergraduate, graduate, and doctoral levels in the fields of philosophy, Quranic sciences, principles of jurisprudence, Arabic literature, and sects.

Teaching higher levels in the seminaries of Qom and Tehran, as well as philosophy and men for 10 years.

Presenting articles on the Ahl al-Bayt (AS) and the political issues in political newspapers in widely circulated newspapers and numerous interviews with the press and radio and television, especially international networks.

Compilation of a treatise on the history and beliefs of the Alawites.

Writing a book in Arabic about human purity.

Participating in many debates on doctrinal issues in different countries of the world.

Teaching in Islamic student associations inside and outside the country before and after the revolution. Approved the candidacy of the Assembly of Leadership Experts from Tehran province in 2006.

== Foreign trips ==
Hojjat-ul-Islam and Muslims Navvab has traveled to many countries around the world in the years after the revolution on propaganda, cultural, and relief missions.

Traveling to the Vatican

In October 2023, Seyyed Abolhasan Navvab, the president of the Religions and Denominations University, met Pope Francis and talked with him. The visit provided an opportunity to the Iranian and Pontifical universities to sign an agreement to spread a culture of peace and interfaith dialogue through projects to be extended to schools and universities in other countries, eliminating barriers and ending hostility and biases.

Academic offices
Preceded by Jafar Ebrahimi	President of University of Religions and Denominations; 1995–present	Succeeded by Incumbent
