= Chhote Sarkar =

Chhote Sarkar (lit. 'Little Lord') may refer to these Indian films:

- Chhote Sarkar (1938 film), a 1938 Hindi film
- Chhote Sarkar (1961 film), a 1961 Hindi film
- Chhote Sarkar (1974 film), a Hindi film
- Chhote Sarkar (1996 film), a 1996 Bollywood romantic drama film

== See also ==
- Chhota (disambiguation)
- Sarkar (disambiguation)
- Chhote Nawab (disambiguation)
- Bade Sarkar (lit. 'Big Lord'), a 1957 Indian film
