= Beni Bahadur =

Indian Awadhi administrator

Maharaja Beni Bahadur was an administrator, minister, soldier and househelp (in reverse chronology) in the courts of the Nawabs of Awadh from 1733 / 1734 to at least 1798 and at most 1814. He was most notable for his rapid rise to power, industry and charity.

== Personal life ==
Beni was born to a Brahmin father, Khem Karan, who lived in Baiswara in the modern day Unnao district. His father practiced as a physician during 1732 - 1739 when Saadat Ali Khan I was the reigning Nawab. The family, facing poverty, had to migrate to Faizabad where Khem Karan was blinded and had to resort to begging for feeding his family. Beni at the age of 10 would visit the house of Atma Ram Khatri (the Diwan of Saadat Ali Khan I), who was a generous philanthropist. Guiding his father to the crowd of the poor gathered in the Diwan's house to receive charity, he would talk to the servants of the Diwan's son Ram Narain. Because of his personality, he found himself employment with them during the year 1733 / 1734. His being 10 years old at this point of time suggests he was born in 1723 / 1724. He was illiterate all his life.

== Career ==
At the age of 15/16 in the year 1739 Beni became a trooper in Ram Narain's bodyguard on the recommendation of a Nautch girl who said he wasn't doing work fit for a Brahmin. In 1748 Raja Ram Narain was sent by Safdar Jang to Awadh's frontier districts of Shahabad (Hardoi) and Shikohabad (Agra). Beni became the Raja's house manager and the title Prasad was suffixed to his name.

His arrangements for the marriage ceremonies of Ram Narain's youngest son Hridai Narayan at Lahore, and the generous donation of his few savings for the marriage of his poor friend's daughter earned him praise. He was introduced to the Awadh Durbar (court) by now Diwan Ram Narain's son Maha Narain. He was the main administrator in the Diwan's office after the Narains' descent into debauchery. Once, the Nawab Shuja-ud-Daula required 3 lakh rupees which couldn't be arranged by the Diwan but Beni was able to. Consequently, he was appointed Faujdar (magistrate) of Khairabad (Sitapur) on his request. There he reconciled with the scattered Mughal officers, increased crown territory and tax revenues.

Beni's benefactors Ram Narain and Maha Narain were deposed and he was installed in their offices. He was given the title Bahadur when he was made the Diwan; Raja and later Maharaja when he became the Naib (deputy governor) of Awadh and Allahabad in the year 1759. He was the only Hindu Naib during Shuja-ud-Daula's reign and perhaps the only Hindu Naib during the reign of all the Nawabs of Awadh. In 1758 Beni Bahadur removed Azam Shah the ruler of Azamgarh from power and installed Fazl Ali Khan in his place but later had to depose him too and send him to Ghazipur.

Beni Bahadur was sent by Shuja-ud-Daula along with Raja Balwant Singh to prevent his brother Muhammad Quli Khan from crossing the Ganga and to imprison him. The 2 Rajas blocked the river near Ramnagar and imprisoned the Khan's group near Mughalsarai. When the Khan went to Shuja-ud-Daula to make peace his camp was destroyed by Beni Bahadur and the Raja. When Shuja-ud-Daula went to join Ahmad Shah Abdali's camp for the Third Battle of Panipat, he chose Beni Bahadur to be the guardian and advisor to his son Asaf-ud-Daula who was the acting Nawab.

He commanded the Awadh army against the raids in January 1761 led by the rebel Balbhadra Singh of Tiloi and Hindupat of Pratapgarh with other kings and the invading Maratha forces led by Gopal Ganesh Barve and Krishnanand Pant. He along with Rai (later Diwan) Surat Singh, Mirza Najaf Khan and Isma'il Beg drove the Marathas back to their positions in Kora Jahanabad and Kara and temporarily exiled the rebel kings. After the Maratha loss in the Third Battle of Panipat Beni Bahadur retook Kora and Kara. To reinstall Shah Alam II on the Mughal throne, Maratha help was necessary, so Kara was returned to the Marathas. Kora was handed over by Beni Bahadur to Rup Singh Khichar, who lost all of it to the Marathas except for Ghazipur fort (near Fatehpur).

In February 1764, Beni Bahadur along with Mir Qasim and Najaf Khan sieged Kalinjar Fort and succeeded in taking revenge by defeating Hindupat, the Raja of Bundelkhand. Hindupat had previously defeated Nawab Shuja-ud-Daula's army twice. Determined to take up the cause of Mir Qasim against the English, the Nawab's army arrived at Daudnagar on 23 April prepared for battle. Beni Bahadur along with Mir Qasim was leading the advance guard. They were joined by the troops of Balwant Singh, Inayat Khan Rohilla (son of Hafiz Rahmat), René-Marie Madec, Walter Reinhardt Sombre (Samru) and Jean Baptiste Joseph Gentil. The combatants totaled 40,000 which forced Major John Carnac's comparatively smaller contingent to retreat.

At the Battle of Panch Pahari in Bihar on 3 May 1764 Beni Bahadur and Balwant Singh were on the right flank of Shuja-ud-Daula, opposite the Bengal Army's left flank. The two along with the Mughal Emperor and Mir Qasim were inactive. At the Battle of Buxar on 23 October 1764, the left flank commanded by Beni Bahadur consisted of the Sheikhs of Kakori and Lucknow under Sheikh Ghulam Qadir Khan. This flank was overwhelmed by the British right flank under Lieutenant Nichol and Captain Harper, Ghulam Qadir Khan was killed. Beni Bahadur after entering the fight got confused and fled.

On or before 28 October 1764, Shuja-ud-Daula and Beni Bahadur arrived in Bahadurpur. There, the Nawab wanted to fight the British once again by allying with the Rohilla and Maratha, but Beni Bahadur advised against this and the Nawab agreed. He went to Varanasi to negotiate with Hector Munro who was representing the East India Company. Munro asked for Mir Qasim and the French officers in the Awadh army to be handed over. Munro pledged he would vacate the Awadhi territory occupied if his conditions were met. He promised the Subahdar rank to Beni Bahadur if he defected to the British. Beni Bahadur then in a series of defections oscillated between being loyal to Shuja-ud-Daula and the British.

When Beni Bahadur became aware of the British demand for the women/members in the Nawab's household as hostages, he knew the Nawab would never agree and returned to the Nawab's camp. Beni Bahadur then committed multiple surprising lapses of duty:

- Raja Balbhadra Singh's escape from Beni's custody
- Zamindar Bijai Singh of Bahraich's murder of Bande Ali Khan (the son of district collector Khadim Hussain Khan), creation of disturbances in Beni's district, expulsion of his agents Din Dayal and Haji Beg
- Beni's implicit role in Bijai Singh's escape
- Instigating the Muslim Raja of Mohammadi to revolt.

== Blinding and death ==
The Nawab had secured Robert Clive's approval to punish disloyal officers under Company protection at a meeting in Chhapra. The Nawab, unhappy with Beni Bahadur's frequently changing loyalties, action or lack of it and instigated by Salar Jang's advice captured Beni Bahadur at Khairabad (Sitapur) and confiscated his property. He was imprisoned in Faizabad and blinded by iron nails on 2 March 1767 to prevent him from becoming powerful again lest the British help him. The towns/villages of Ajgain, Jhalotar and Beniganj in modern day Uttar Pradesh were granted to him as Jagir in the year 1770. He died during the reign of Nawab Saadat Ali Khan II (between 1798 - 1814).

Political offices
Preceded by Khwaja Tamkeen Khan	Naib of Awadh and Allahabad 1759 – February 1767	Succeeded by Muhammad Elich Khan
Preceded by Maha Narain Khatri	Diwan of Awadh and Allahabad 1759 – February 1767	Succeeded by Raja Surat Singh
