= Ali-Akbar Navvab Shirazi =

Iranian scholar and poet (1773–1847)

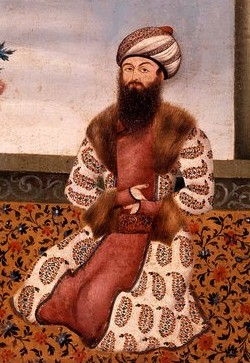
- Painting of Ali-Akbar Navvab Shirazi, made in the 19th century
- Born: 1773; Shiraz, Zand Iran
- Died: 1847 (aged 73–74); Shiraz, Qajar Iran
- Occupations: Scholar, poet and calligrapher
- Notable work: Tazkera-ye delgosha
- Style: Iraqi style
- Spouse: Daughter of Hossein Ali Mirza
- Children: Mirza Abu-Taleb; Mirza Ali Sadr-ol-Olama; Sadra
- Father: Aqa Ali Naqib
- Relatives: Aqa Bozorg (uncle)

Ali-Akbar Navab Shirazi (Persian: علی‌اکبر نواب شیرازی; 1773–1847), also known by his pen name Besmel (بسمل), was a scholar, poet and calligrapher in Qajar Iran.

== Biography ==
Navvab Shirazi came from a highly affluent family of scholars originally from Isfahan, who resettled in Shiraz following the fall of the Safavid dynasty. Shiraz was the capital of the Fars province, then ruled by the Zand dynasty, until its conquest by the Qajar dynasty in 1791.

In the Hakim school of Shiraz, both Navvab Shirazi's father Aqa Ali Naqib and uncle Aqa Bozorg worked as teachers. There Navvab Shirazi was educated in Persian and Arabic, grammar, literature, mathematics, science and logic. Learning and teaching were the main focus of his life, which he mainly spent with mystics and spiritual travelers, and also with other intellectuals and artists.

Navvab Shirazi became so well known that when the Iranian king Fath-Ali Shah Qajar (r. 1797–1834) was in Shiraz, he visited him to show his respect. Navvab Shirazi had a close relationship with Fath-Ali Shah's son Hossein Ali Mirza, the governor of the Fars province. He was given the title "Navvab" ("deputy") after marrying Hossein Ali Mirza's daughter.

Navvab Shirazi died in 1847 in Shiraz. Like his father and ancestors, he was buried in the cemetery of Seyyed Mir Mohammad. He had three sons, Mirza Abu-Taleb (died 1883/84) and Mirza Ali Sadr-ol-Olama (died 1889), who both became prominent scholars, and Sadra (died 1824) who was killed by an earthquake.

== Writings ==
Despite showing some aspects of the Indian style in his poems, Navvab Shirazi is considered to have written in the Iraqi style. He is the author of a divan (collection of poems) written in Persian and Arabic. His most prominent work is the Tazkera-ye delgosha, which contains the biography of 157 poets, as well as some short writings on various topics associated with the Fars province.

== Sources ==
- Rastegar, Nosratollah (2018). "Nawwāb Širāzi, ʿAli-Akbar". In Yarshater, Ehsan (ed.). Encyclopædia Iranica (Online ed.). Encyclopædia Iranica Foundation. ISBN 978-0-7100-9090-4.
- Shahbazi, Alireza Shapur (2004). "Shiraz i. History to 1940". In Yarshater, Ehsan (ed.). Encyclopædia Iranica (Online ed.). Encyclopædia Iranica Foundation. ISBN 978-0933273818.
- Tiburcio, Alberto (2018). "Ḥājj ʿAlī Akbar Navvāb Shīrāzī". Christian-Muslim Relations. A Bibliographical History Volume 20. Iran, Afghanistan and the Caucasus (1800–1914). Brill.
