= Paraura =

- Village
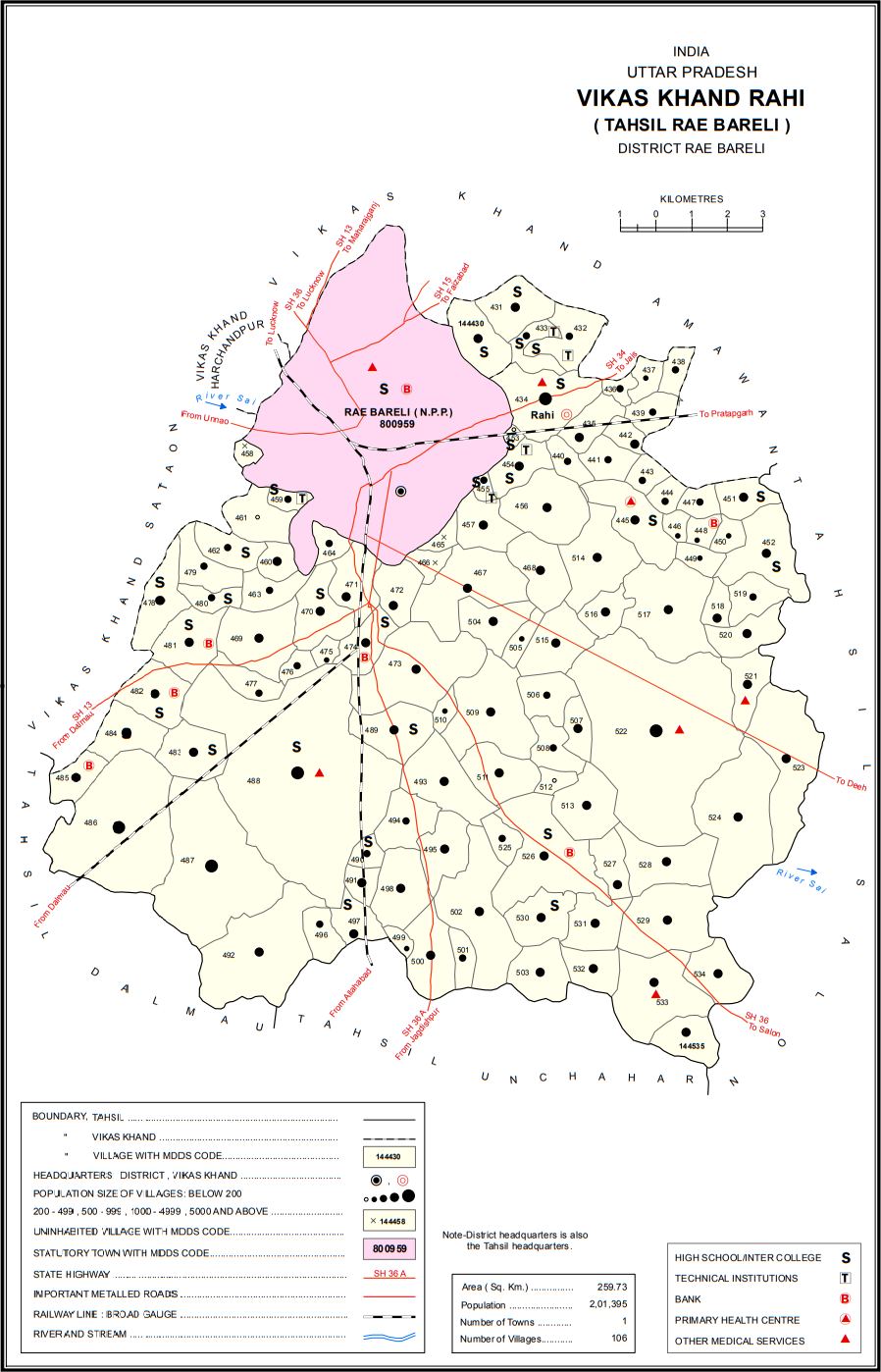
- Map showing Paraura (#503) in Rahi CD block

- Location in Uttar Pradesh, India
- Coordinates: 26.091112°N 81.295982°E
- Country: India
- State: Uttar Pradesh
- District: Raebareli

Area
  - Total: 1.748 km^{2} (0.675 sq mi)

Population (2011)
  - Total: 1,060
  - Density: 606/km^{2} (1,570/sq mi)

Languages
  - Official: Hindi
- Time zone: UTC+5:30 (IST)
- Vehicle registration: UP-35

Paraura is a village in Rahi block of Rae Bareli district, Uttar Pradesh, India. It is located 13 km from Rae Bareli, the district headquarters. As of 2011, it has a population of 1,060 people, in 191 households. It has one primary school, no medical facilities and does not host a weekly haat or a permanent market. It belongs to the nyaya panchayat of Bhaon.

The 1951 census recorded Paraura as comprising 4 hamlets, with a total population of 270 people (137 male and 133 female), in 54 households and 54 physical houses. The area of the village was given as 449 acres. 16 residents were literate, 15 male and 1 female. The village was listed as belonging to the pargana of Rae Bareli South and the thana of Jagatpur.

The 1961 census recorded Paraura as comprising 4 hamlets, with a total population of 353 people (180 male and 173 female), in 77 households and 77 physical houses. The area of the village was given as 449 acres.

The 1981 census recorded Paraura as having a population of 552 people, in 103 households, and having an area of 177.26 hectares. The main staple foods were listed as wheat and rice.

The 1991 census recorded Paraura as having a total population of 641 people (326 male and 315 female), in 128 households and 126 physical houses. The area of the village was listed as 185 hectares. Members of the 0-6 age group numbered 127, or 20% of the total; this group was 53% male (67) and 47% female (60). Members of scheduled castes numbered 232, or 36% of the village's total population, while no members of scheduled tribes were recorded. The literacy rate of the village was 22% (117 men and 24 women). 178 people were classified as main workers (172 men and 6 women), while 184 people were classified as marginal workers (2 men and 182 women); the remaining 279 residents were non-workers. The breakdown of main workers by employment category was as follows: 145 cultivators (i.e. people who owned or leased their own land); 16 agricultural labourers (i.e. people who worked someone else's land in return for payment); 0 workers in livestock, forestry, fishing, hunting, plantations, orchards, etc.; 0 in mining and quarrying; 8 household industry workers; 3 workers employed in other manufacturing, processing, service, and repair roles; 0 construction workers; 1 employed in trade and commerce; 0 employed in transport, storage, and communications; and 5 in other services.
