= Mazaheri =

Mazaheri is a surname. Notable people with the surname include:

- Ali Mazaheri (born 1982), Iranian boxer
- Hossein Mazaheri (born 1933), Iranian Grand Ayatollah
- Kaveh Mazaheri (born 1981), Iranian director and screenwriter
- Mohammad Rashid Mazaheri (born 1989), Iranian footballer
- Ramin Mazaheri (born 1983), Iranian audio engineer and music producer
- Tahmasb Mazaheri (born 1953), Iranian politician and economist
