= Navvab (district) =

Coordinates: 35°41′42.81″N 51°22′41.7″E

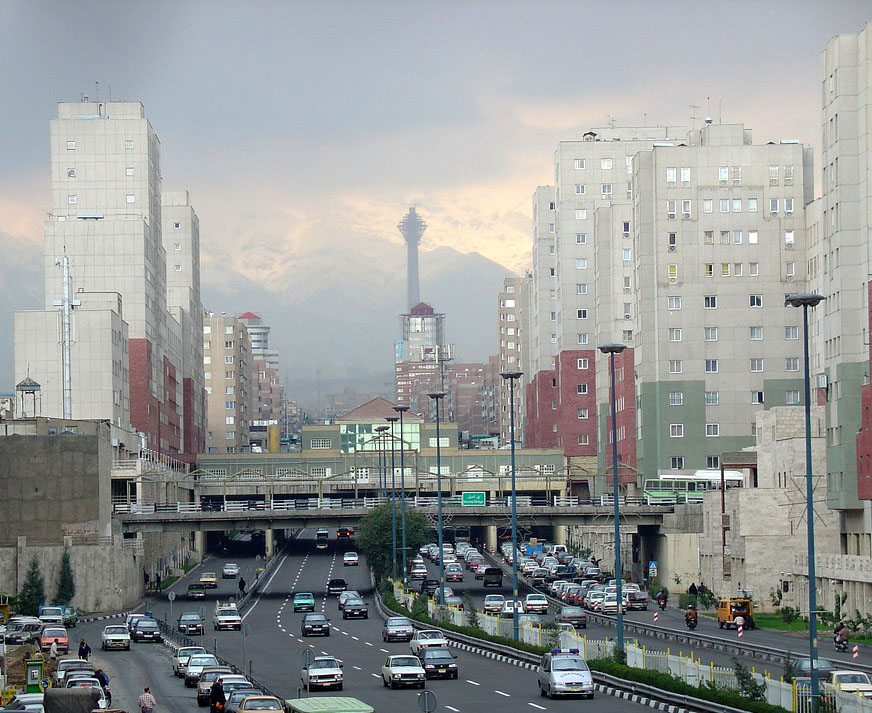
Northward view of Navvāb street.

Navvāb (Persian: نواب) is a district in the south-west of the central district of Tehran, Iran.
