= Nawabganj, Bara Banki Assembly constituency =

Former constituency of Uttar Pradesh, India

Coordinates: 26.932°N 81.202°E

Nawabganj
- Former constituency for the Uttar Pradesh Legislative Assembly

Constituency details
- Country: India
- Region: North India
- State: Uttar Pradesh
- District: Barabanki
- Established: 1961
- Abolished: 2012
- Reservation: None

Nawabganj is a former constituency of the Uttar Pradesh Legislative Assembly, in the state of Uttar Pradesh, India. It was in Barabanki district.

== Members of the Legislative Assembly ==
Election	Name	Party
1962	Jamilur Rahman	Indian National Congress
1967	Anant Ram Jaiswal	Sanghata Socialist Party
1969	Anant Ram Jaiswal	Sanghata Socialist Party
1974	Ram Chandra Bux Singh	Communist Party of India
1977	Mohd. Shamim Ansari	Janata Party
1980	Parwati Devi	Janata Party
1985	Ram Chandra Bakhsh Singh	Communist Party of India
1989	Ram Chandra Bakhsh Singh	Communist Party of India
1991	Chotey Lal Yadav	Janata Party
1993	Chotey Lal Yadav	Samajwadi Party
1996	Sangram Singh	Indian National Congress
2002	Chotey Lal Yadav	Samajwadi Party
2007	Sangram Singh	Bahujan Samaj Party

== See also ==
- Barabanki district
- List of constituencies of the Uttar Pradesh Legislative Assembly
