= Nawabganj Bird Sanctuary =

Nature reserve in Uttar Pradesh, India

Nawabganj Bird Sanctuary नवाबगंज बर्ड सैंक्चुरी
- Shahid Chandra Shekhar Azad Bird Sanctuary
- IUCN category IV (habitat/species management area)
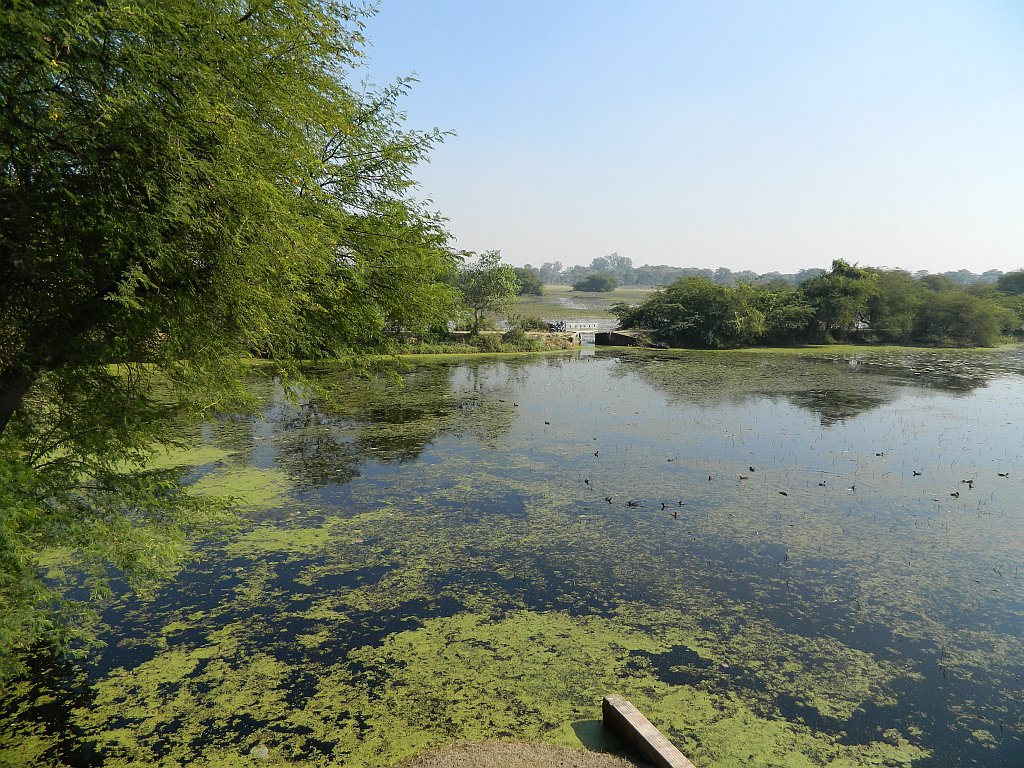

- Location within Uttar Pradesh Location within India
- Interactive map of Nawabganj Bird Sanctuary नवाबगंज बर्ड सैंक्चुरी
- Location: Nawabganj, Uttar Pradesh, India
- Coordinates: 26.6191858°N 80.6531205°E
- Governing body: Government of India

Ramsar Wetland
- Official name: Nawabganj Bird Sanctuary
- Designated: 19 September 2019
- Reference no.: 2412

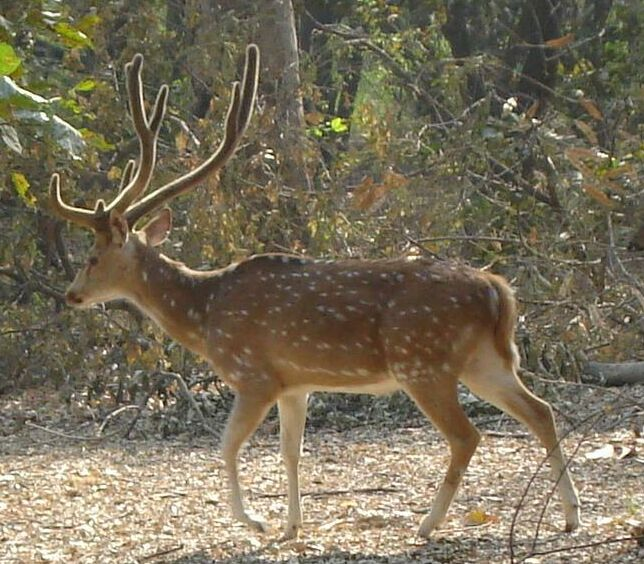
A spotted deer in the Nawabganj Bird Sanctuary.

Nawabganj Bird Sanctuary, renamed in 2015 Shahid Chandra Shekhar Azad Bird Sanctuary, is a bird sanctuary located in Unnao district on the Kanpur-Lucknow highway in Uttar Pradesh, India consisting of a lake and the surrounding environment. It is one of the many wetlands of Northern India. The sanctuary provides protection for 250 species of migratory birds mostly from CIS (or formerly USSR) countries, but the numbers have been dwindling since the 1990s, most having relocated to newer areas in Himachal and Rajasthan. The sanctuary also houses a deer park, watchtowers and boats.

== Birds ==
The avian population here comprises a mix of residents as well as migratory birds. The birds migrate across Himalayas from Tibet, China, Europe and Siberia during winters. Some of these birds fly over 5000 km and above 8500 meters high to reach here. Some of the major migratory birds during the season are greylag goose, pintail, cotton teal, red-crested pochard, gadwall, shoveller, coot and mallard. Some major local migratory and residential birds are sarus crane, painted stork, peafowl, white ibis, dabchick, whistling teal, open-bill stork, white-necked stork, pheasant-tailed jacana, bronze winged jacana, purple moorhen, lapwing, tern, vulture, pigeon, king crow, Indian roller and bee-eater.

== Reptiles ==
The major reptiles found in the sanctuary are cobra, viper, krait, ratsnake and water snakes.

== Deer park ==
A small park for deer has been established in the vicinity of the sanctuary. There are spotted and barking deer in the park. It is one of the main attractions in the sanctuary.

== Hospitality ==
A guesthouse with bedding and lodging is provided inside the sanctuary along with a restaurant and a children park.

== Image gallery ==
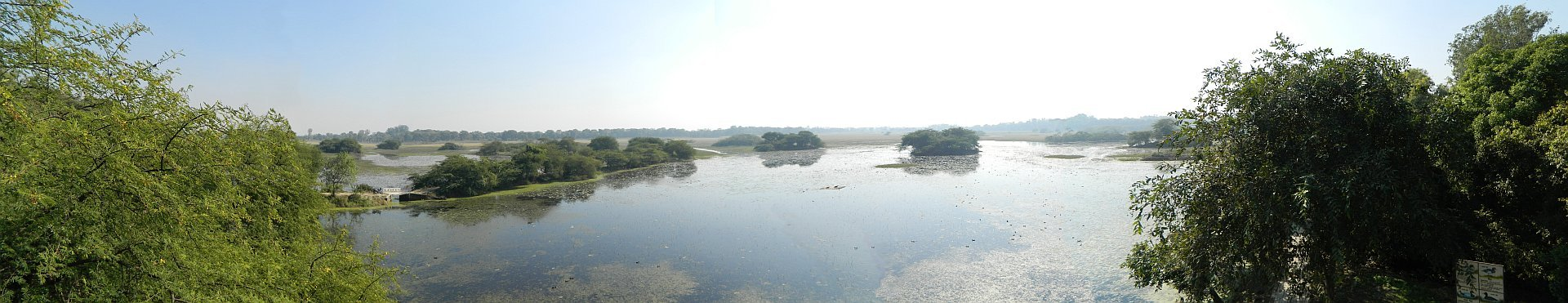
Panorama of Nawabganj Bird Sanctuary

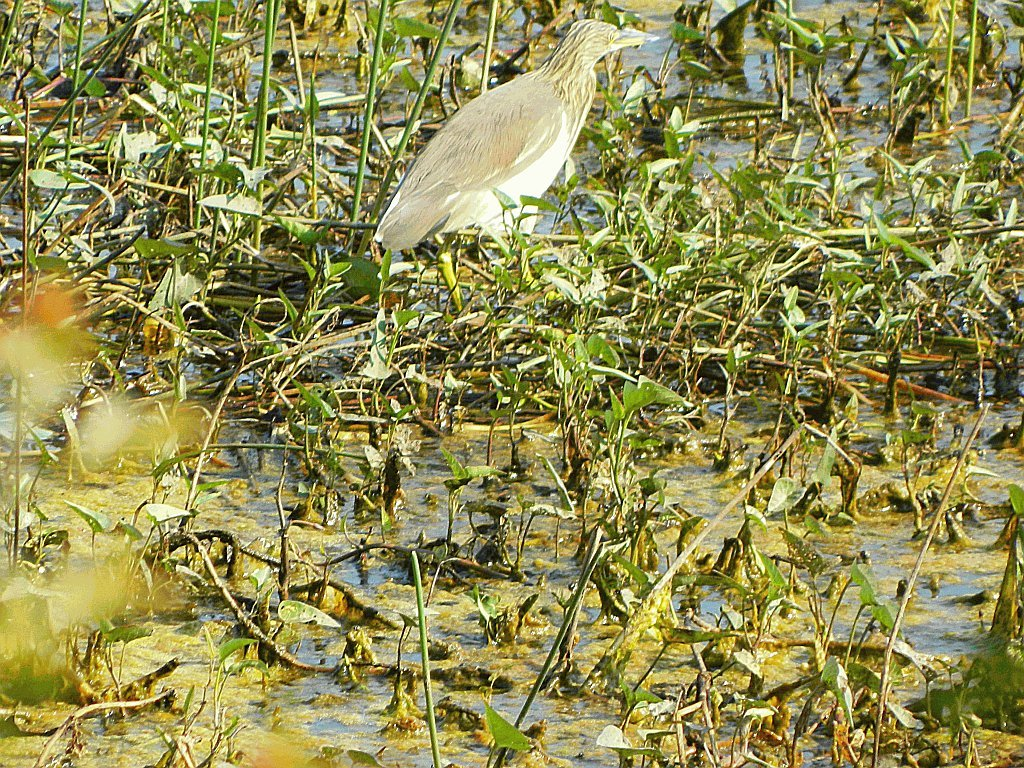
A pond heron at the bird sanctuary

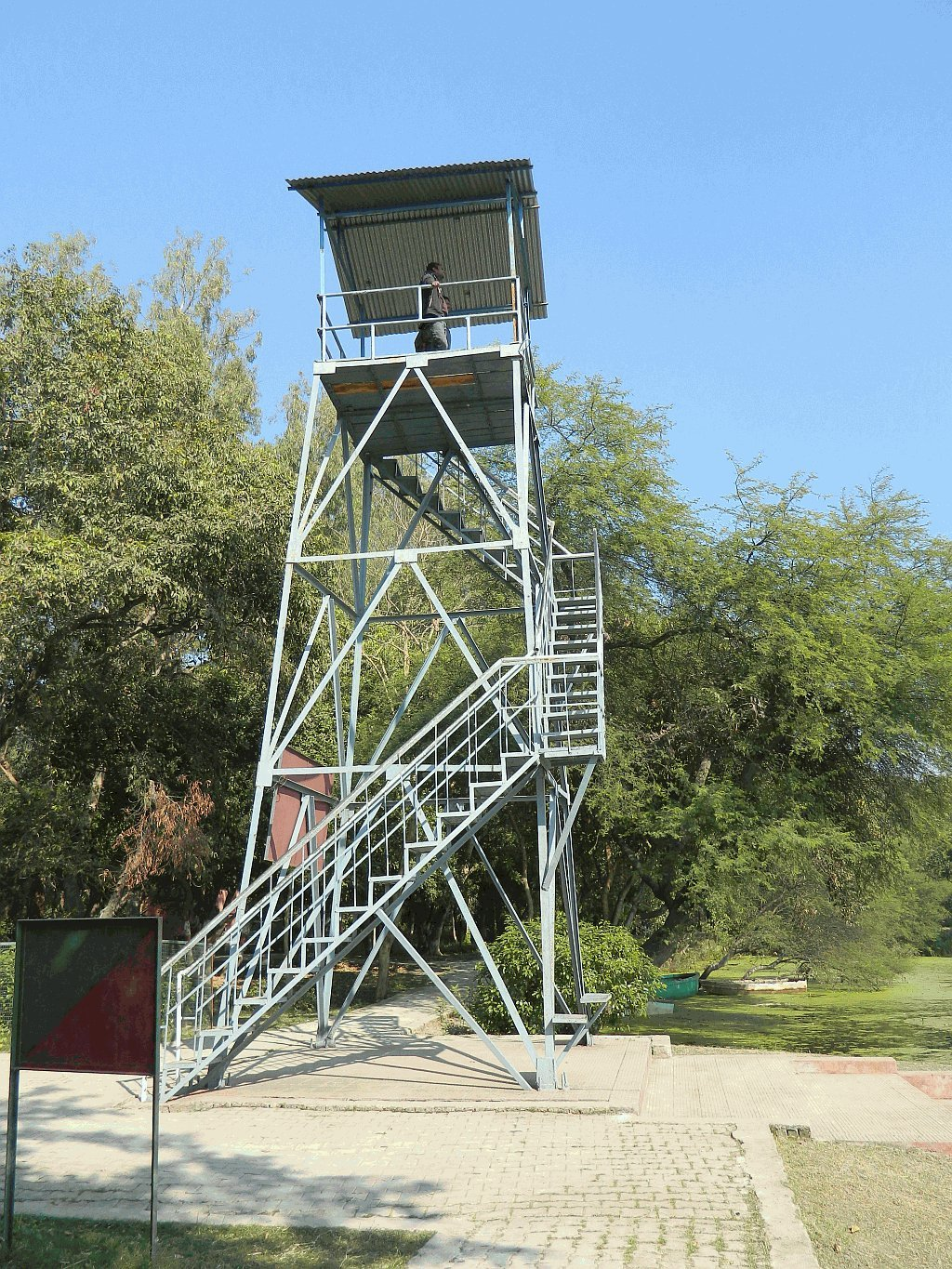
Watch tower

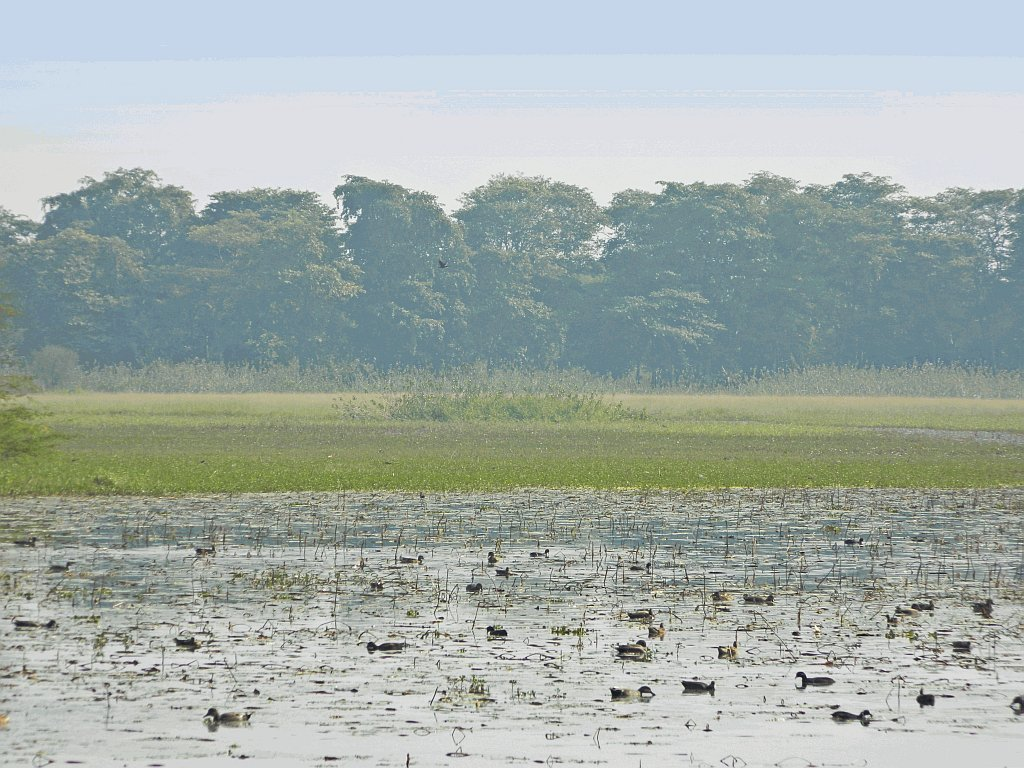
Wetlands of Bird Sanctuary

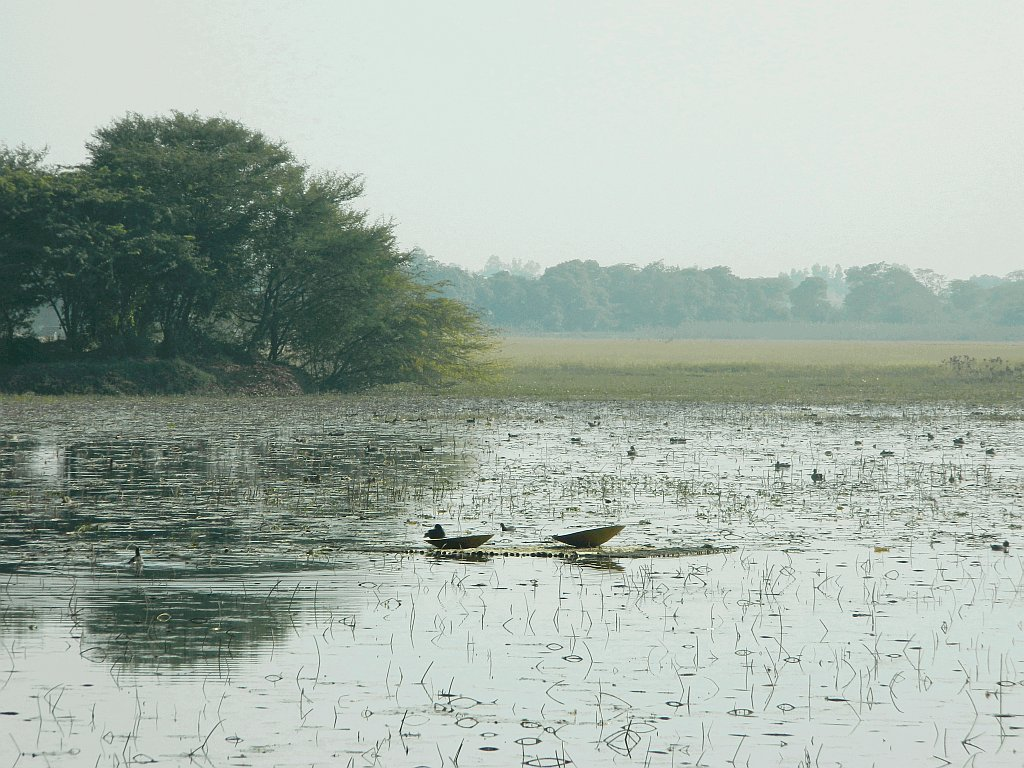
Wetlands of Bird Sanctuary

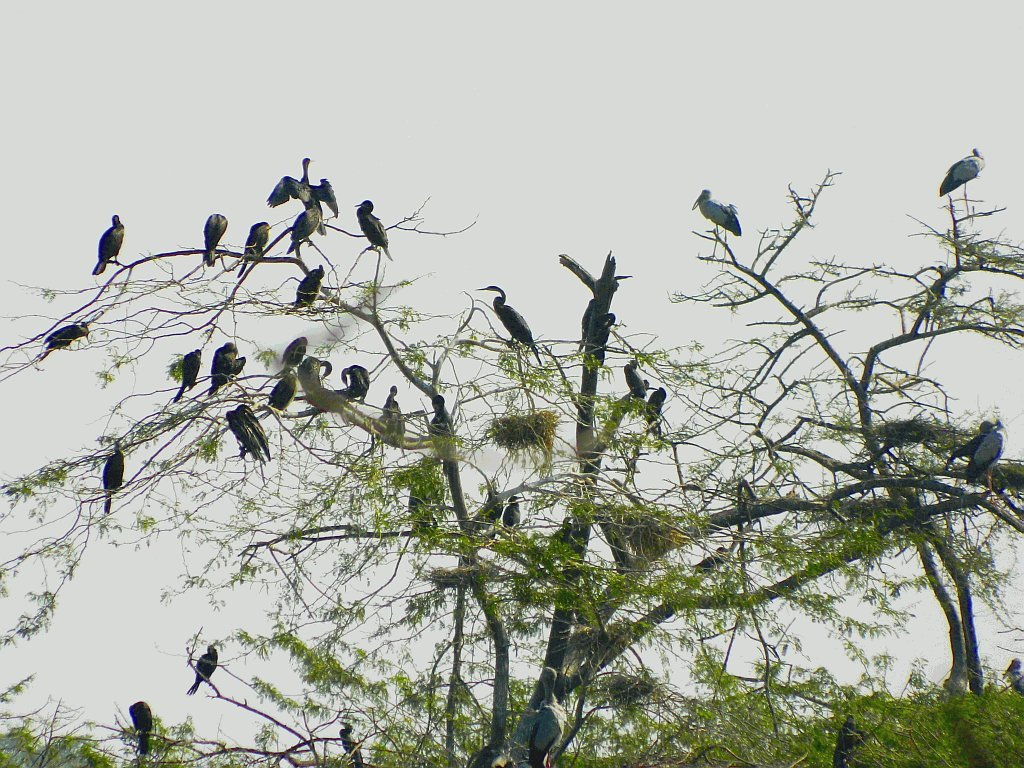
Migratory birds in winter

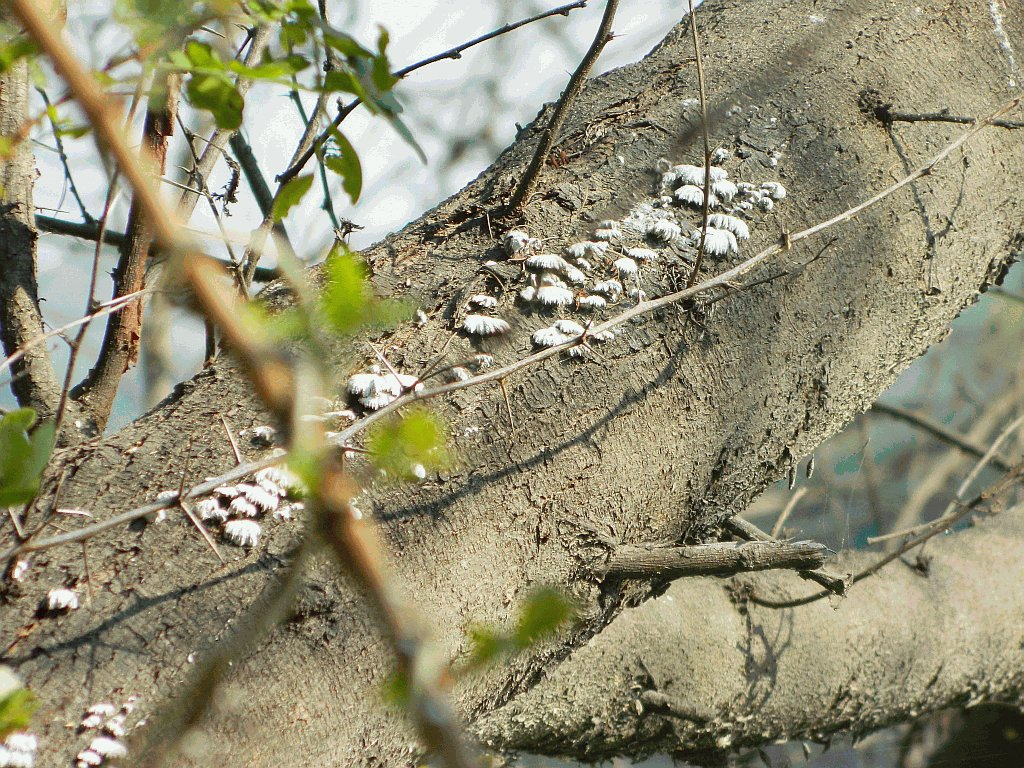

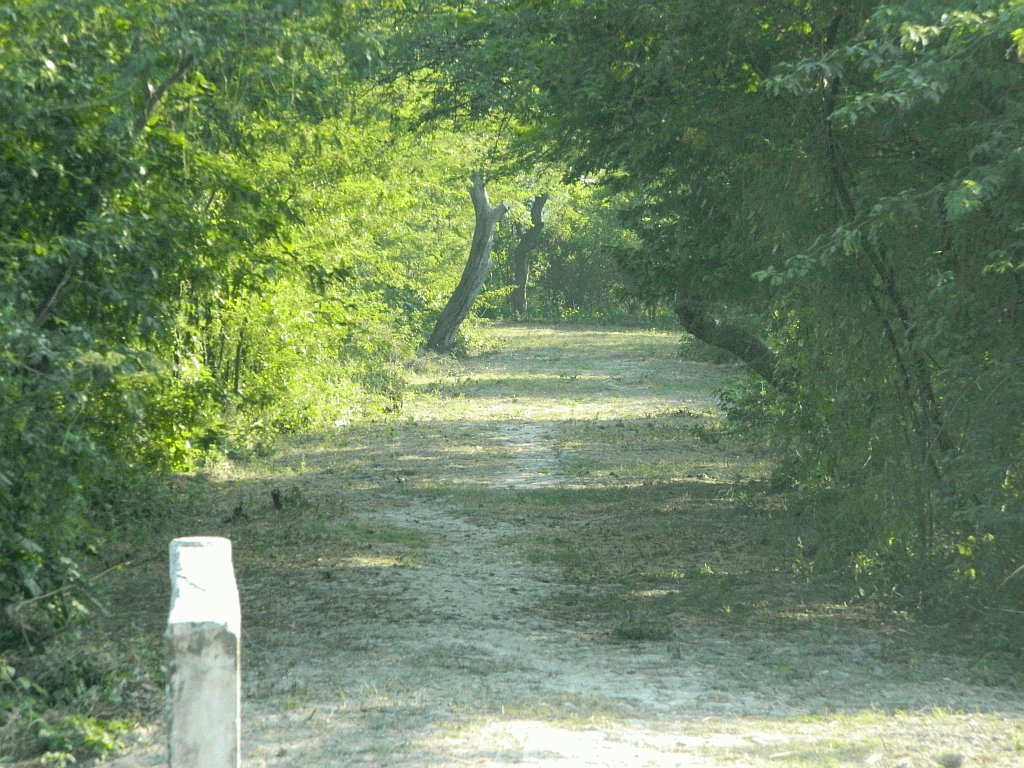

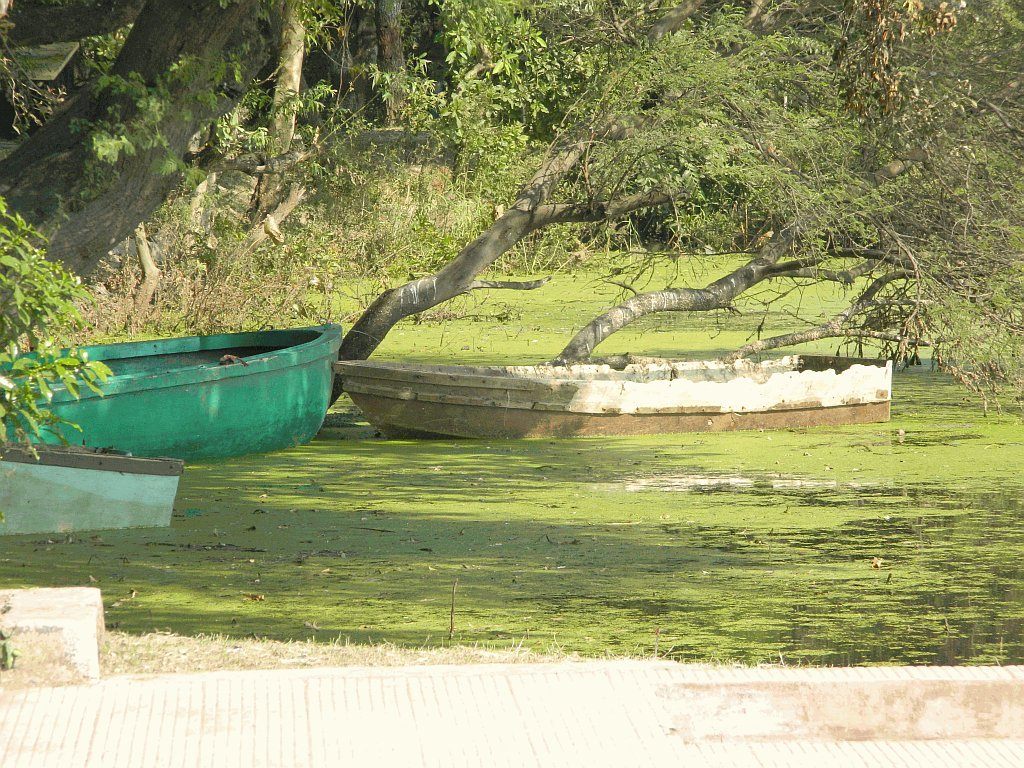
Boating in lake

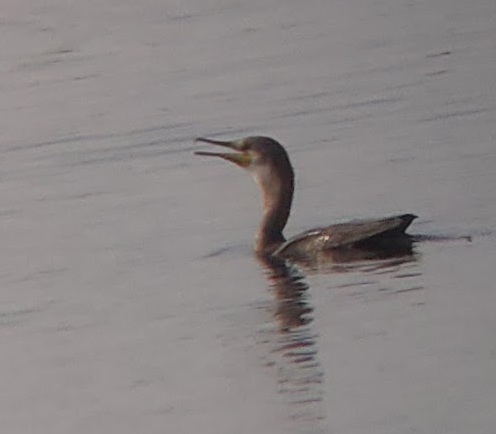
Indian Cormorant

== See also ==
- Wildlife refuge
- Nature reserve
