= University of Religions and Denominations =

University in Qom, Iran

- دانشگاه اديان و مذاهب; Dāneshgāh-e Adyān va Mazāheb
- Type: Private
- Established: 2005
- Affiliations: Shi'a Islam
- Chancellor: Dr. Mostafa Jafartayyari
- Academic staff: 1556
- Students: 14117
- Location: Qom, Iran; 34°33′24″N 50°48′58″E
- Campus: Urban
- Colors: Blue
- Website: urd.ac.ir/en/

The University of Religions and Denominations (Persian: دانشگاه اديان و مذاهب) is a teaching and research center in Qom, Iran. It focuses on the study of religions and Islamic sects.

The President of the University is Dr. Mostafa Jafartayyari. The university is also a member of the Islamic Seminary.

== History ==
In 1995 a group of scholars from Hawza of Qom interested in and concerned with religious and cultural matters decided to pioneer a movement towards the study of various religions and other Islamic sects and denominations. This resulted in the establishment of a research institute that became the University of Religions and Denominations.

== Faculties ==
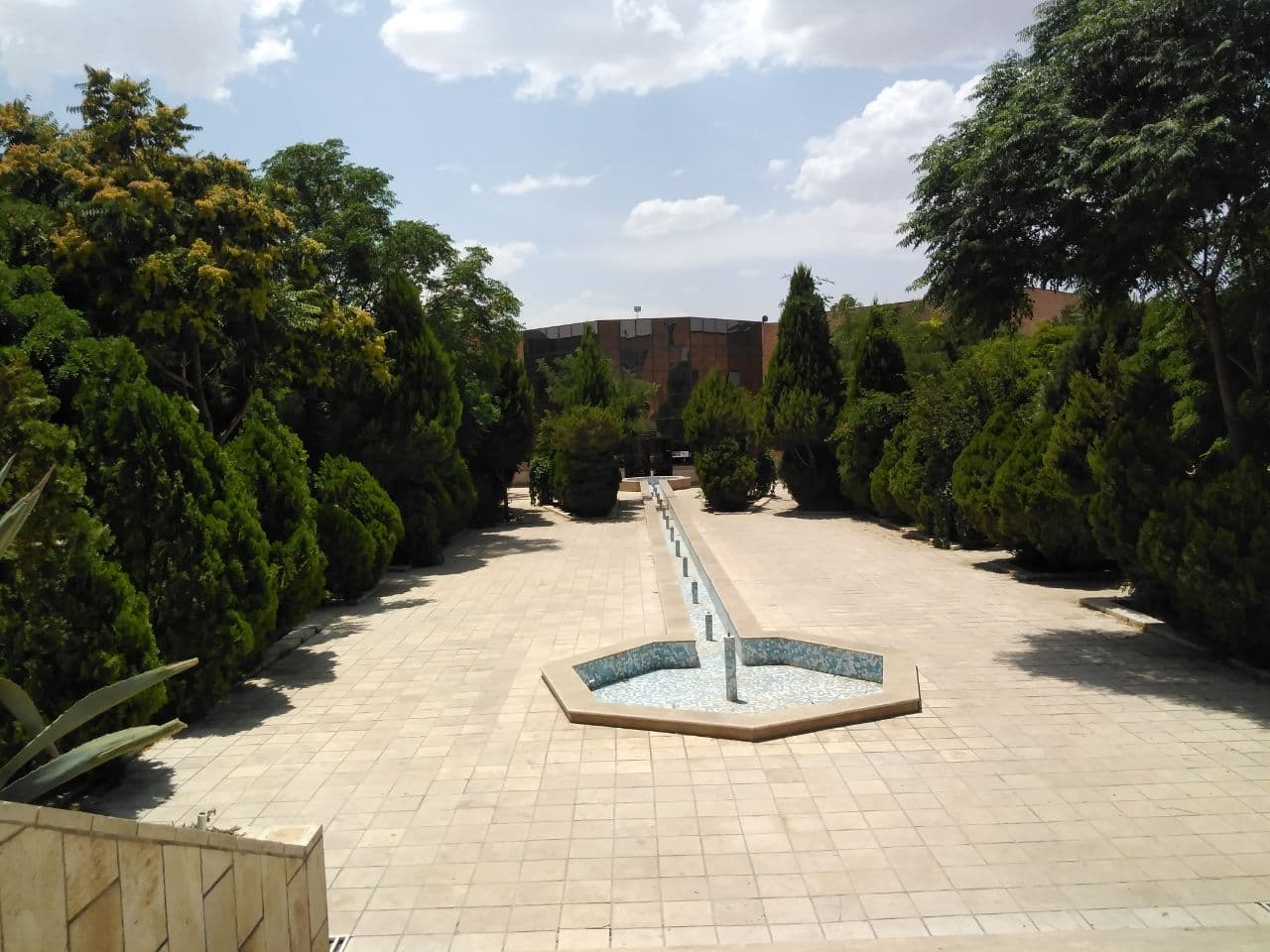
A view of the campus of the University of Religions and Denominations

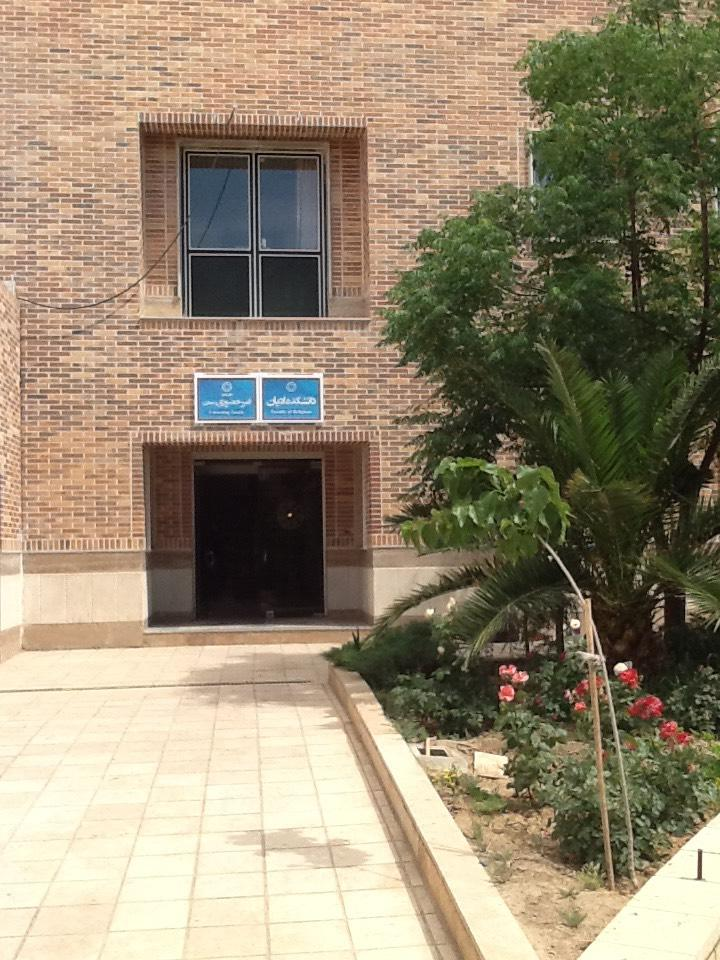
University of Religions and Denominations - Faculty of Religions

The university currently has twelve faculties with various departments under them:

1. Faculty of History
  - Department of History of Iran
2. Faculty of Islamic Denominations
  - Department of Comparative Jurisprudention and Law
  - Department of Islamic Denominations
3. Faculty of Law
  - Department of Law
4. Faculty of Media and Communications
  - Department of Media Management
5. Faculty of Mysticism
  - Department of Religions and Mysticism
  - Department of Islamic Mysticism
6. Faculty of Nations, Cultures, and Languages
  - Department of Arabic Language
7. Faculty of Philosophy
  - Department of Contemporary Philosophy
  - Department of Islamic Philosophy and Kalām
8. Faculty of Quranic Studies
  - Department of Quranic Studies
9. Faculty of Religion and Art
  - Department of Art
10. Faculty of Religions
  - Department of Abrahamic Religions
  - Department of Non-Abrahamic Religions
  - Department of Iranian Religions
  - Department of the Study of Religion
11. Faculty of Shi'i Studies
  - Department of Shi'i kalam
  - Department of Shi'i Denominations
12. Faculty of Woman and Family
  - Department of Studies of Women

== Ranking ==
University rankings
- University of Religions and Denominations

Global – Overall
- RUR World: 705 (2023)

According to the 2023 rankings of the best universities given by the Round University Ranking (RUR), University of Religions and Denominations has gained a country rank of 14 among 24 universities in Iran and a world rank of 705 among 1217 universities from a wide range of geographical locations, representing more than 80 nations

== Religious Studies Work-group ==
The group is engaged in researching the Philosophy, Psychology, and Sociology of Religion.

== The Centre for Religious Studies ==
The university has a dedicated research centre which has five research groups and corresponding work-groups. All research undertaken by the members is carried out under the supervision of this centre. These groups include:

1. Abrahamic Religions: this group carries out research on history and theories, philosophy and theology, ethics and spirituality, sacred scriptures and the laws and rituals of Christian and Jewish religions.
2. Non-Abrahamic Religions: this group is concerned with the study of Eastern, The Far East and Persian Religions.
3. Sufism and Islamic Spirituality: This group works on the history of Sufism, theoretical spirituality, Sufi sects and the comparative study of the mysticism of different religions. Islamic Sects: This group carries out research on Shia, Sunni and Jurisprudential Sects

== Publications ==
The University’s Publishing House is under the supervision of the president. It is responsible for printing and publishing titles containing the outputs of scholars and researchers.

== The Office of International Relations and Cooperation ==
The Office of International Relations and Co-operation of the university is active in establishing dialogues between followers of various religions and denominations as well as development of relations with universities abroad.

== Library ==
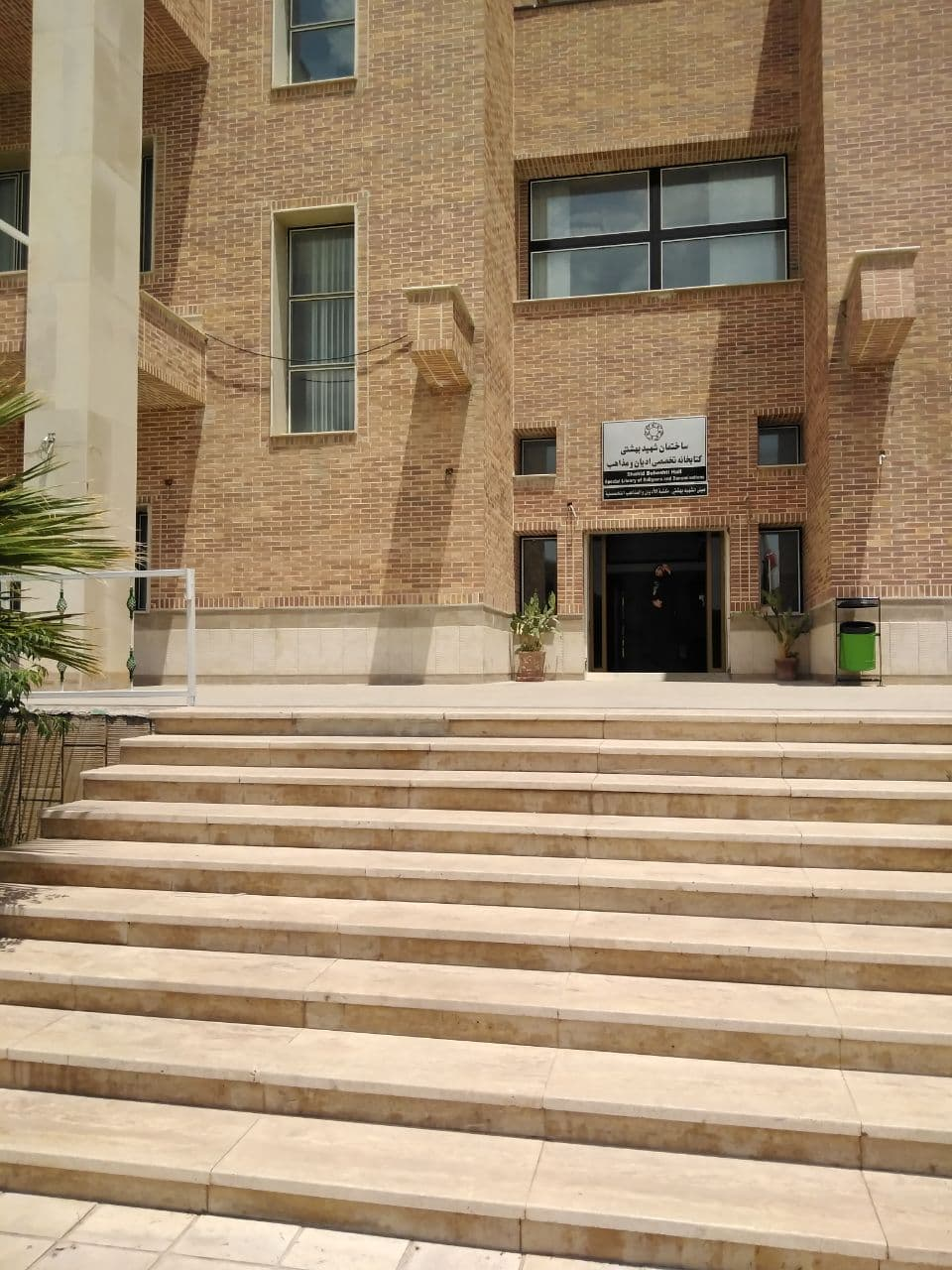
Library of the University of Religions and Denominations

The university contains a specialized library of religions and denominations. The library contains a large supply of books and periodicals in Persian, Arabic and English. Resources are mainly on Islamic denominations, Christianity, eastern religions and interdisciplinary studies.

The library has around 56,000 titles in Persian and Arabic languages and about 16,000 in Latin and English.

== The Office of Religions and Human Rights Studies ==
The office was established in order to examine the meeting points of universally accepted moral values of human rights and religions, to discover the positions of different religions, and to promote the religious approach to Human Rights.

== The Women and Family Research Institute ==
This Institute was created as a response to Iranian society's need for scientific knowledge of women and families and the need to make families efficient in Islamic society.

== The Open Education Center ==
The Open Education Center was established in 2016 with the aim of short-term education through workshops, skills, lectures, and scientific travel.
