= Ram Baksh Singh =

Maharaja Rao Ram Baksh Singh Rajpati Rajdev Bahadur
- Maharaja Rao of Baiswada State
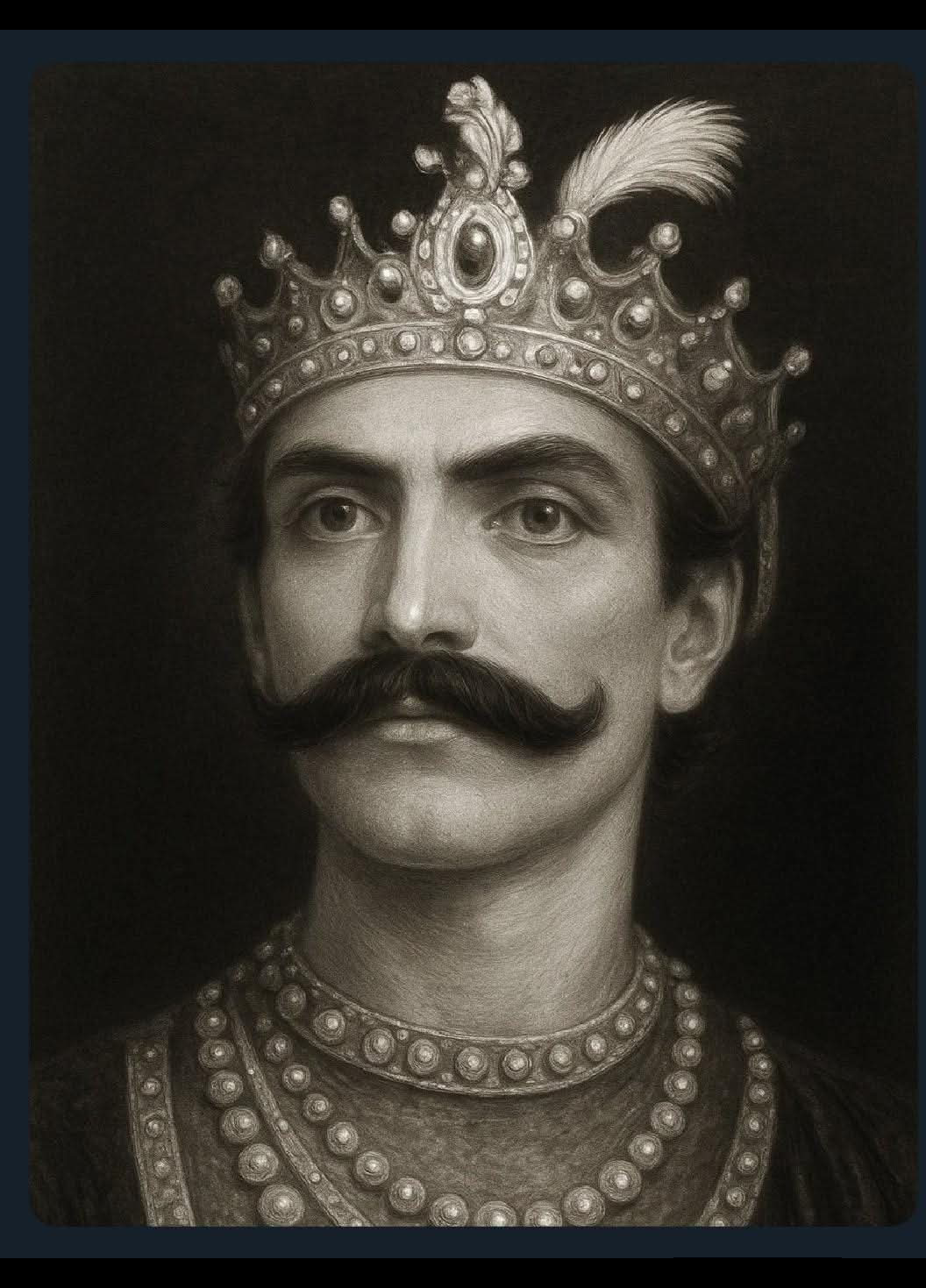
- Died: 28 December 1859; Baksar
- Dynasty: Bais
- Religion: Hinduism

Maharaja Rao Ram Baksh Singh Rajpati Rajdev Bahadur was a Bais Rajput Maharaja Rao of princely state of Baiswada State in Oudh region of Uttar Pradesh during the British East India Company rule. He was one of the leaders of the Sepoy Mutiny, and a close associate of Nana Sahib. He was hanged by the British on 28 December 1859 for taking part in the revolt and being found guilty of the killing of British soldiers. In 1992, the Government of India built a memorial at the place where he was hanged to honor his death.

The dilapidated remains of his capital Daundia Khera fort - consisting of the ruins of his royal mansion, a huge campus spread over 380 acres, a temple to Shiva which has been in use for more than 180 years, and various other structures - have been in the news recently due to an urban legend of gold treasure buried there. The Archaeological Survey of India, upon excavation his fort in October 2013, discovered a brick wall, sherds, pieces of bangles, hopscotch toys, and a mud floor which could date back to the 17-19th centuries, but no gold treasure or any other valuable materials.
