= Rana Beni Madho =

Leader of the Indian rebellion of 1857

Rana Beni Madhav Baksh Singh
- Rana of Shankarpur Estate; General of Baiswada Royal Army
- Predecessor: Rana Shiv Prasad Singh
- Successor: Rana Raghuraj Singh
- Died: 1859; Dang Valley, Nepal
- Spouse: Rani Chandralekha
- Dynasty: Bais Rajput
- Father: Thakur Ram Narayan Singh of Jagatpur
- Religion: Hinduism

Rana Beni Madhav Baksh Singh or Beni Madho Baksh Singh Bais was an important leader in the Indian rebellion of 1857 from the Oudh region (in the present-day state of Uttar Pradesh). He belonged to the Bais clan of Rajputs and was the ruler of the Shankarpur Estate in modern-day Rae Bareli, part of the old Baiswara or Baiswada State in Oudh. He led a rebellion against th British forces in 1857. His son was married to the granddaughter of another prominent revolutionary leader Kunwar Singh of Jagdishpur estate.

== Early life ==
Rana Beni Madho became Rana of Shankarpur estate after the death of Rana Shiv Prasad Singh who had adopted him. He was married to Princess Chandralekha of Kamiar estate and had a brother named Jugraj Singh who also participated in the revolt. He was one of the leaders of the Bais clan of Rajputs in the Baiswara region of South Oudh. He controlled four forts at Shankarpur, Pukbiyan, Bhikha and Jagatpur. The Shankarpur Fort owned by him was one of the strongest in Oudh. He was a religious man and an ardent devotee of Goddess Durga. He was given the title of Nasim by Nawab Wajid Ali Shah of Oudh, fighting for the Nawab on many occasions, and also had the title of "Sirmaur Rana Bahadur Diler Jung".

== Role in the 1857 rebellion ==
During the revolt of 1857, he was one of the most powerful revolutionary leaders and was appointed as the administrator of the Jaunpur and Azamgarh regions by the newly proclaimed Nawab of Awadh, Birjis Qadar. This has been established from the proclamation of Birjis Qadar on 17 August 1857 which explains:

" As I am fully bent upon populating the land, securing off conveniences for its people and betterment of its inhabitants. I now therefore, decided to exterminate the cruel, ill behaved kaffir ( the unbelieving) Firangis from my hereditary dominion both old and new. Consequently, I have nominated the brave Raja Beni Madho Singh for the administration of the ilagas of Jaunpur and Azamgarh and order that in the obedience to the instructions of the said Raja, you should capture, put to the sword and annihilate the entire group of these perverted unbelievers and make every effort to extirpate them from this country. Considering the said Raja a permanent Amil of this part of the country, you should do your very best for the collection of revenue and betterment of the ryot. You will, consequently, be rewarded with the favours."

He led one of the largest armies in 1857 numbering around 25,000 troops and 28 guns against the British forces. He had a good rapport with his tenants as well as village zamindars who remained loyal to him during the rebellion. In one of the sharp encounters that took place at Rae Bareli (then Salon district), the revolutionaries under Beni Madho killed a British officer named Major Gall.

Rana Beni Madho was then pursued by four senior commanders of the British columns — Lord Clyde, Hope Grant, Brigadier Evelegh (commanding the 20th Regiment of Foot) and Alfred Horsford (commanding the Rifle Brigade). They cornered him at Dundi Khera (Unnao district) where his forces fled, reducing his numbers to 12,000. However he managed to successfully escape to the north of the Ghaghara river. The great revolt in South Oudh formally ended only after he moved out of the Oudh region.

== Death ==
He was killed in the fighting against Gurkhas of Nepal in late 1859.
