= Bihar, Unnao =

Bihar Bihār
- Village
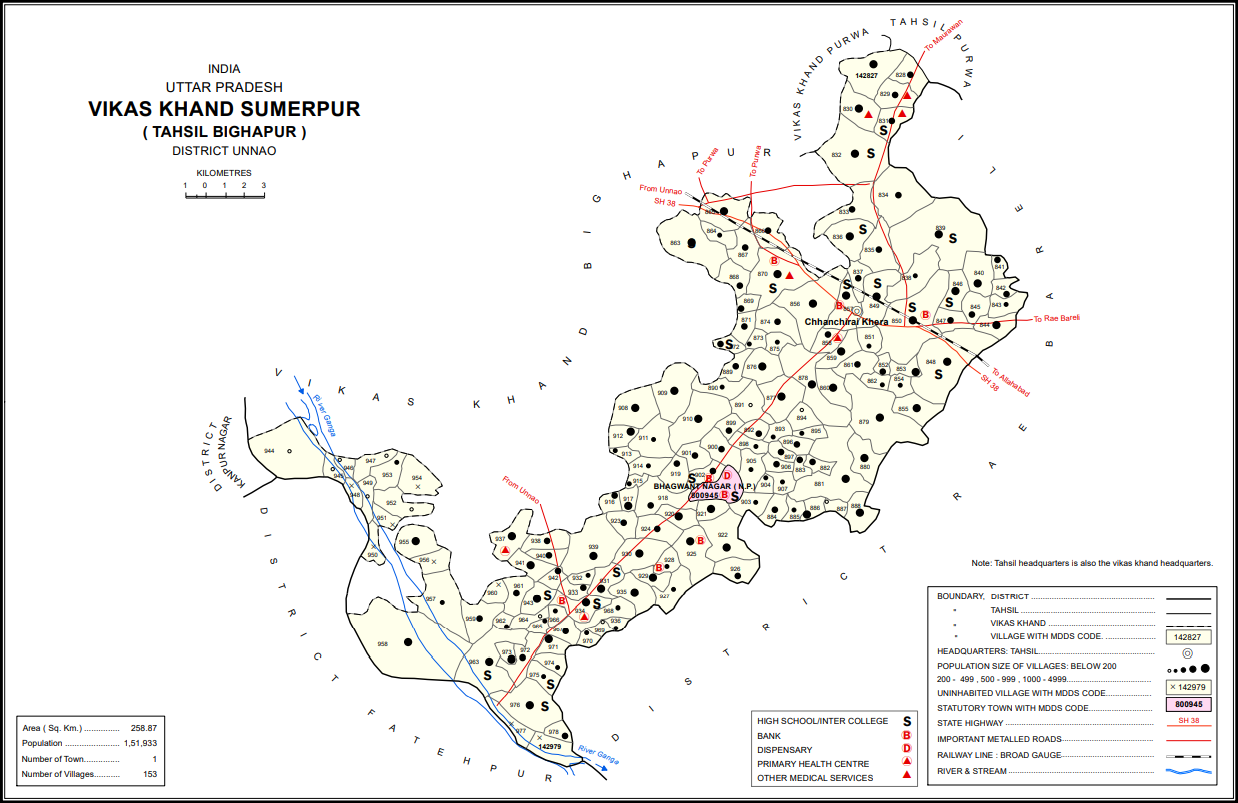
- Map showing Bihar (#850) in Sumerpur CD block

- Location in Uttar Pradesh, India
- Coordinates: 26.285985°N 80.829623°E
- Country India: India
- State: Uttar Pradesh
- District: Unnao

Area
  - Total: 6.226 km^{2} (2.404 sq mi)

Population (2011)
  - Total: 5,952
  - Density: 956.0/km^{2} (2,476/sq mi)

Languages
  - Official: Hindi
- Time zone: UTC+5:30 (IST)
- Vehicle registration: UP-35

Bihar is a village in Sumerpur block of Unnao district, Uttar Pradesh, India. Located on the main Unnao-Raebareli road, just to the east of the Loni river and near its confluence with the Kharahi, Bihar was briefly the headquarters of a tehsil in Raebareli district from 1860 until 1862, when it was moved into Unnao district. As of 2011, the population of Bihar is 5,952, in 1,088 households, and it has 5 primary schools and no healthcare facilities.

== History ==
According to tradition, Bihar was founded by Birbhan, ancestor of the Bais taluqdars of Patan-Bihar, and named "Birhar" after himself. More realistically, the name was probably derived from a vihara or Buddhist monastery. Bihar was made the seat of a pargana under the Mughal emperor Akbar. At some point during the 1700s, it was the site of a battle between the Raos of Daundia Khera, the Raja of Maurawan, and the chief of Shankarpur, all from the Bais clan. It was chosen as the seat of a tehsil by the British in 1860, but when it was moved into Unnao district two years later the tehsil was dissolved and Bihar was put under Purwa tehsil instead.

At the turn of the 20th century, Bihar was described as a small town with several historical monuments, surrounded by a rich agricultural countryside. There had previously been two marketplaces, Radhaganj and Durgaganj, but Durgaganj had not held a market since the Indian Rebellion of 1857 and had fallen into disrepair. Radhaganj, which had been built by the taluqdar Shiudin Singh in 1846 and named after the goddess Radha, held markets on Wednesdays and Saturdays. Shiudin Singh had also built a temple to Radha in Bihar. The fair held in honour of Biddhia Dhar had an average attendance of about 14,000 people then. A masonry tank was built in 1862 by Ikram-ullah, who was a tehsildar of Bihar, and financed in part by a subscription collected from the taluqdars. Near the old tehsil buildings, there was also a mud-built sarai, and to the south of the Rae Bareli road were the ruins of an old fort. There was a police station and a middle vernacular school with 106 students. The population of Bihar in 1901 was 1,853, including a Muslim minority of 147.

The 1961 census recorded Bihar as comprising 9 hamlets, with a total population of 2,278 (1,027 male and 1,251 female), in 535 households and 450 physical houses. The area of the village was given as 1,557 acres, and it had a post office at the time. Bihar then had the following small industrial establishments: 2 places producing edible fats/oils, 4 miscellaneous food processing establishments, 2 garment manufacturers, 1 place making shoes, 4 makers of sundry hardwares, 1 bicycle repair shop, and 1 maker of jewellery or precious metal objects.

== Culture ==
Bihar holds a fair in honour of Biddia Dhar, a Hindu faqir who died in the village of Bakra Khurd. Arjun Singh, the taluqdar of Patan-Bihar, had been a follower of his, and he had his kundi (i.e. mortar and pestle buried at Bihar and had a platform raised on the site in his honour. The fair takes place during the month of Pus (i.e. December and January), and vendors bring various items including cloth, brass, copper, iron utensils, and gur.
