= Bayas (disambiguation) =

Bayas may refer to:

- Bayas, a commune in France
- Bayas Islets a group of islands in the Philippines
  - Bayas Island, the largest island in the Bayas Islets and also a barangay
- Bayas (river), a river in Spain
- Bayas (Castrillón), a parish in Spain
- Las Bayas, a village in Argentina
- Bayās Ābād, a village in Iran
- Parc Bayas, a sports complex in Haiti
- Bais (clan) also Bayas, a clan of the Rajput caste in India

== See also ==
- Bais (disambiguation)
