= Simarpaha =

- Village
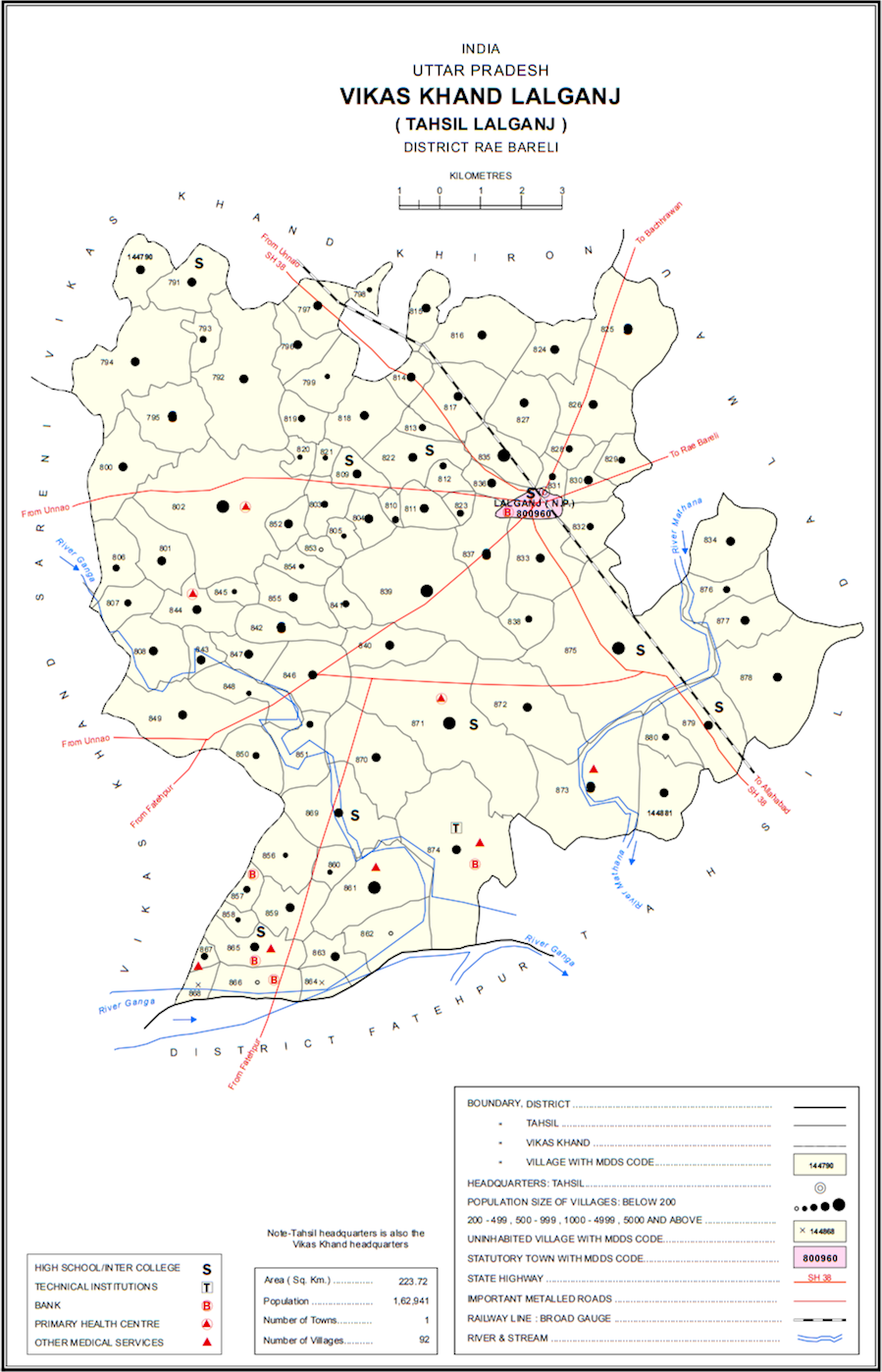
- Map showing Simarpaha (#839) in Lalganj CD block

- Location in Uttar Pradesh, India
- Coordinates: 26.147193°N 80.950298°E
- Country India: India
- State: Uttar Pradesh
- District: Raebareli

Area
  - Total: 7.869 km^{2} (3.038 sq mi)

Population (2011)
  - Total: 8,391
  - Density: 1,066/km^{2} (2,762/sq mi)

Languages
  - Official: Hindi
- Time zone: UTC+5:30 (IST)
- Vehicle registration: UP-35

Simarpaha is a village in Lalganj block of Rae Bareli district, Uttar Pradesh, India. It is located 3 km southwest of Lalganj on the road to Ralpur on the Ganges. In addition to the main site, the village also includes several dispersed hamlets. Simarpaha was historically the seat of a taluqdari estate held by a branch of the Bais Rajputs. As of 2011, it has a population of 8,391 people, in 1,501 households. It has two primary schools and no healthcare facilities.

== History ==
Simarpaha was historically the seat of a taluqdari estate held by a branch of the Bais Rajputs. The Simarpaha branch was founded by Rudra Sah, the younger brother of Rana Doman Deo, who was the ancestor of the Khajurgaon branch. Rudra Sah founded Shahpur and dispossessed his cousins of the villages that had been assigned to them for support; he was a powerful ruler noted for his conquests. His inheritance was divided several generations later, between his great-grandsons Pirthi Raj and Hindupat. Pirthi Raj received Simarpaha, while Hindupat received Chandania.

In the early 1800s, Pirthi Raj's fifth-generation descendant Lalji acquired a large territory and founded the market called Lalganj, which became the main commercial hub in Baiswara. His son and successor Fateh Bahadur died childless, as did his adopted successor Basant Singh who died during the Indian Rebellion of 1857. Basant Singh's widow was Thakurain Dariao Kunwar, an Amethia from the Birsinghpur dynasty, and she obtained the sanad for the Simarpaha estate. When she died in 1893, the sanad passed to Thakur Sher Bahadur Singh of Chandania. Dariao Kunwar had previously adopted him as her successor, but she had later renounced this; she had also named him in her will but repudiated this in 1866 and again in 1873. As a result, her closest Amethia relative, Raja Rameshwar Bakhsh Singh of Birsinghpur, successfully sued Sher Bahadur for control of the Simarpaha estate. Sher Bahadur appealed but died in 1903, leaving the estate in Rameshwar Bakhsh Singh's possession for the time being.

At the turn of the 20th century, Simarpaha was described as a large and scattered village in the pargana of Dalmau. It had a primary school at that point, but no other civic buildings. The population as of 1901 was 2,451 people, including a Muslim minority of 195; the largest Hindu group was the Chamars. The Simarpaha estate was at that point held by Rameshwar Baksh Singh of Birsinghpur ("to the great resentment of the Bais"), but the taluqa did not include all the village lands — the rest was held in joint zamindari tenure by Bais tenants.

The 1961 census recorded Simarpaha (as "Semar Paha") as comprising 14 hamlets, with a total population of 3,618 people (1,774 male and 1,844 female), in 690 households and 590 physical houses. The area of the village was given as 1,947 acres and it had a post office at that point.

The 1981 census recorded Simarpaha (as "Semarpaha") as having a population of 5,193 people, in 934 households, and having an area of 787.92 hectares. The main staple foods were listed as wheat and rice.
