= Mangadpur =

- Village
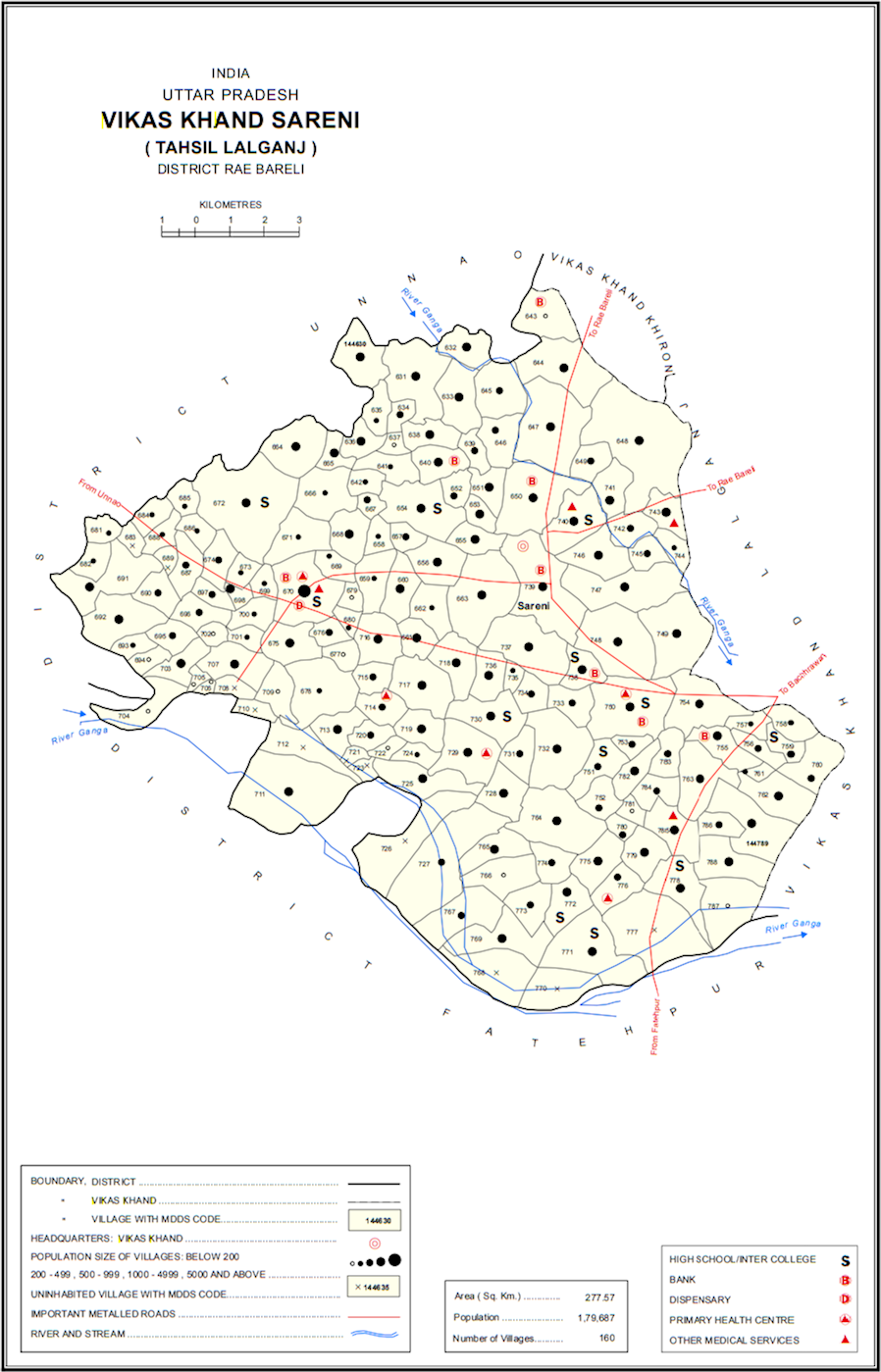
- Map showing Mangadpur (#659) in Sareni CD block

- Location in Uttar Pradesh, India
- Coordinates: 26.142709°N 80.77682°E
- Country: India
- State: Uttar Pradesh
- District: Raebareli

Area
  - Total: 0.683 km^{2} (0.264 sq mi)

Population (2011)
  - Total: 403
  - Density: 590/km^{2} (1,530/sq mi)

Languages
  - Official: Hindi
- Time zone: UTC+5:30 (IST)
- Vehicle registration: UP-35

Mangadpur is a village in Sareni block of Rae Bareli district, Uttar Pradesh, India. It is located 25 km from Lalganj, the tehsil headquarters. As of 2011, it has a population of 403 people, in 88 households. It has one primary school, no healthcare facilities, and hosts a weekly haat but not a regular market. It belongs to the nyaya panchayat of Murarmau.

The 1951 census recorded Mangadpur as comprising 1 hamlet, with a population of 154 people (76 male and 78 female), in 31 households and 26 physical houses. The area of the village was given as 172 acres. No residents were literate. The village was listed as belonging to the pargana of Sareni and the thana of Sareni.

The 1961 census recorded Mangadpur as comprising 1 hamlet, with a total population of 178 people (87 male and 91 female), in 33 households and 32 physical houses. The area of the village was given as 172 acres.

The 1981 census recorded Mangadpur (as "Mangatpur") as having a population of 275 people, in 46 households, and having an area of 69.60 hectares. The main staple foods were given as wheat and rice.

The 1991 census recorded Mangadpur as having a total population of 321 people (144 male and 177 female), in 61 households and 61 physical houses. The area of the village was listed as 70 hectares. Members of the 0-6 age group numbered 56, or 17% of the total; this group was 45% male (25) and 55% female (31). Members of scheduled castes made up 82% of the village's population, while no members of scheduled tribes were recorded. The literacy rate of the village was 20% (48 men and 16 women). 145 people were classified as main workers (79 men and 66 women), while 0 people were classified as marginal workers; the remaining 176 residents were non-workers. The breakdown of main workers by employment category was as follows: 47 cultivators (i.e. people who owned or leased their own land); 92 agricultural labourers (i.e. people who worked someone else's land in return for payment); 1 worker in livestock, forestry, fishing, hunting, plantations, orchards, etc.; 0 in mining and quarrying; 0 household industry workers; 2 workers employed in other manufacturing, processing, service, and repair roles; 0 construction workers; 0 employed in trade and commerce; 0 employed in transport, storage, and communications; and 3 in other services.
