= Dubai (disambiguation) =

Dubai is a city of the United Arab Emirates.

Dubai may also refer to:

- Emirate of Dubai, an emirate of the United Arab Emirates whose capital is Dubai
- Dubai (2001 film), a Malayalam film
- Dubai (2005 film), a Filipino film
- Dubai (wrestler), a ring name for American professional wrestler Dara Daivari
- Dubai (yacht), a yacht
- Dubai (typeface), a font commissioned by the Government of Dubai
- Dubai, Unnao, a village in Uttar Pradesh, India
