= Unnao gold treasure incident =

Daundia Khera
- Sangrampur
- Location shown within the Uttar Pradesh state of India
- 26°09′59″N 80°39′12″E
- Region: Unnao district
- Part of: Uttar Pradesh

Site notes
- Material: Stone
- Excavation dates: October 2013
- Archaeologists: Archaeological Survey of India
- Condition: Ruins

In October 2013, in Sangrampur (Daundia Khera) village in the Unnao district of the Indian state of Uttar Pradesh, a local seer named Shobhan Sarkar dreamt that over 1000 tonnes of gold were buried under the ruins of an old fort of a 19th-century king, Ram Baksh Singh. Sarkar wrote to the President of India, the Ministry of Mines (India) and the Archaeological Survey of India (ASI) to consider excavation for the supposed hoard. The excavation work began on 18 October 2013. On 29 October 2013, the ASI announced that there was no gold buried in the location and stopped excavation work. More news was released on 29 October 2013, saying that ASI Director General Pravin Srivastava said the digging area was now planned to be widened, but clarified that the excavation work by his 12-member team had not been stopped. On 18 November 2013, ASI stopped the excavation and began filling up the trenches.

== Village history ==
Sangrampur, also known as Daundia Khera, is a village located in the Bighapur tehsil of Unnao district, about 100 km south of Lucknow city in Uttar Pradesh, India. According to the 2011 census of India, it has 469 households and a population of 2672.

In the 19th century, Alexander Cunningham, the founder of the Archaeological Survey of India, speculated that the site referred to as Hayamukha by Xuanzang, a 7th-century Chinese traveller, might be the present day Daundia Khera. Xuanzang had recorded visiting Hayamukha, where he noted five Buddhist monasteries housing over 1000 members of the Buddhist sect Saṃmitīya. Cunningham considered it "almost certain" that the two places were the same, but acknowledged that there were significant differences between the early descriptions and what he saw then. He also relied upon the thoughts of James Tod, another British scholar who is nowadays not considered a reliable historian.

== Background of incident ==
In September 2013, a local priest named Shobhan Sarkar, who is also revered as a Mahant, claimed that a 19th-century king of Daundia Khera, Ram Baksh Singh, had come to him in a dream and told him that 1000 tons of gold treasure were buried under his palace. In an interview to Wall Street Journal, Sarkar said that the ghost of Singh is worried about the Indian economy and he wants the treasure to be used for the economic growth of the country. Sarkar called the dream "a divine intervention" but refused to tell how, when and why only he learned about the buried treasure. The British had hanged Singh during the 1857 rebellion and destroyed his palace. Sarkar wrote to the Prime Minister, President and the Archaeological Survey of India (ASI) about his dream but his letters went ignored. Some sources say that Sarkar then approached Charan Das Mahant, a Minister of State for agriculture and the food processing industry in the Government of India, while other sources say that the minister heard of the story from a pandit in Kanpur who regularly kept in touch with him.

Minister Mahant visited the alleged treasure trove site on 22 September and 7 October 2013 and convinced the ASI and the Geological Survey of India (GSI) to inspect it. A team from the ASI visited the site on 12 October 2013 and drilled two holes at locations shown to them by Sarkar. The ASI said that they detected metal around 20 meters below the ground. The GSI report also confirmed a prominent non-magnetic anomalous zone occurring at 5–20 m depth, indicative of possible non-conducting, metallic contents or alloys. The ASI announced the excavation of the site which began on 18 October 2013.

== Excavation ==
With due respect to the sadhu, ASI does not go about digging on the basis of dreams. It has not done so in its 150 years of its history. We are conducting the excavation on the basis of scientific reports and historical importance.

— Dr B R Mani, Additional Director-General, ASI

The Ministry of Culture stated that the excavation would take 2–3 weeks to reach the depth of any deposits, while ASI officials at the site have said that the excavation may take months, or even years, as they are using only simple basic tools like grub hoes, pick mattocks and fork cultivators. The ASI has designated an area of 80 meters from east to west and 40 meters from north to south near the fort for the excavation. A team of twelve archaeologists from the ASI, led by its Deputy Director, PK Mishra, began excavation at the alleged gold treasure site in the presence of the Unnao Sub-Divisional Magistrate. The excavation took place in 10 pits, each measuring about 100 square feet. Hundreds of onlookers, Outside Broadcasting B vans, and dozens of journalists from different media organizations were also present. Heavy police security was deployed and night vision cameras were installed to enhance security. Considering the heavy crowd of onlookers, CCTV cameras were installed for security. On 21 October 2013, ASI additional director, Dr. B R Mani, said that after digging 48 cm into the ground, the ASI found a brick wall, shards, pieces of bangles, hopscotch toys and a mud floor which could date back to the 17-19th centuries. Until 24 October 2013, ASI has excavated 217 centimeters of ground. Til 2 November 2013, ASI has excavated 571 centimeters of ground. Sub-divisional magistrate Vijay Shanker Dubey said 70 cm and 30 cm were dug up respectively in two blocks after breaking the rocky base at the fort at Daundiya Kheda village on Saturday, but there is still no sight of the treasure on the 15th day of excavation.

== Development ==
Following media reports that the Government of India was carrying out an excavation on the basis of Shobhan Sarkar's dream, the Ministry of Culture issued a statement to clarify that the excavation was being carried out on the basis of a report by GSI which conducted a Ground Penetrating Radar Survey at the site and reported the presence of "non-magnetic anomalous zone at 5–20 meter below the ground indicative of possible non-conductive metallic contents and/or alloys". Additional director general of ASI B. R. Mani denied the media reports that excavation was being carried out on the basis of a sadhu's dream while the ASI director of exploration doubted that any gold treasure would be found in the excavation. Several interested parties came out to claim a stake in the treasure. One of the king's descendants, Navchandi Veer Pratap Singh expressed his interest. The All India Kshatriya Mahasangha also staked a claim, saying that they are rightful claimants because Ram Baksh Singh belonged to their Kshatriya community. Sarkar had another dream and claimed that 2,500 tons of gold was hidden beneath Shiva Chabutara of Brahm Ashram at Adampur village in Fatehpur district, Uttar Pradesh. It was reported that Sarkar had written to Fatehpurs district magistrate informing about the dream. On the night of 19 October 2013, caretaker Swamy Mohandas was locked up at gunpoint inside an ancient Shiva temple at Gangaghat in Adampur village. The people responsible dug up the ground in search of the alleged treasure. Some villagers claimed that they took away hidden gold.

A Public-interest litigation (PIL) was filed in the Supreme Court of India seeking directions from the court to make proper arrangements for safety and protection of alleged hidden treasure. On 21 October 2013, the court rejected the PIL saying that it cannot pass order on the "ground of assumption".

=== Reaction ===
Former President A. P. J. Abdul Kalam said that, "according to me, science doesn't allow any guess. It [excavation by ASI] must have some logical conclusion." Bharatiya Janata Party politician Narendra Modi mocked the government saying that, "The whole world is laughing at us over this bizarre exercise. Somebody dreamt and the government has launched an excavation." Nationalist Congress Party's leader Sharad Pawar said that, "this will lead to rise in 'buwabaji' (promoting superstition by godmen) in society" and further added that, "government agencies should not participate in such work." Thousands of onlookers were gathered to watch the excavation. Dozens of domestic and foreign TV journalists telecast the event live. Some media houses compared the 'media circus' with that of the 2010 Black comedy film Peepli Live. A journalist from Al Jazeera summed up the spectacle saying that, "We had heard that India is the land of snake charmers. After this we are ready to believe it." The weekly magazine India Today called the excavation "moronic madness" and added, "if this gold hunt ends in finding even a kilo of the yellow, we are doomed. An already overtly superstitious country will rush to self-declared saints and shower them with gold."
