= Bahai, Raebareli =

Bahai Bahāi
- Village
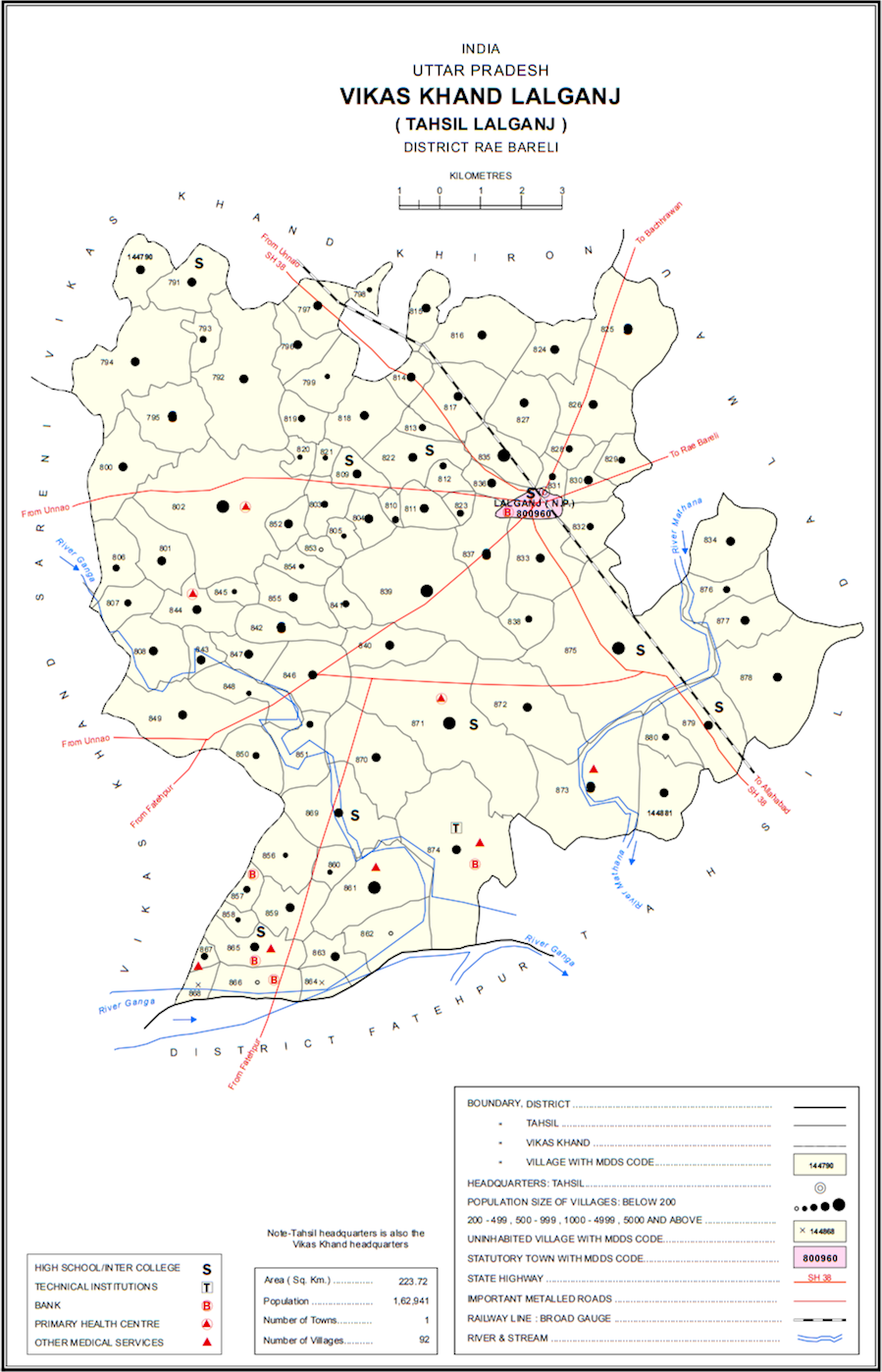
- Map showing Bahai (#875) in Lalganj CD block

- Location in Uttar Pradesh, India
- Coordinates: 26.12898°N 80.99907°E
- Country India: India
- State: Uttar Pradesh
- District: Raebareli

Area
  - Total: 10.884 km^{2} (4.202 sq mi)

Population (2011)
  - Total: 9,368
  - Density: 860.7/km^{2} (2,229/sq mi)

Languages
  - Official: Hindi
- Time zone: UTC+5:30 (IST)
- Vehicle registration: UP-35

Bahai is a village in Lalganj block of Rae Bareli district, Uttar Pradesh, India. It is located 8 km from Lalganj, the block and tehsil headquarters, to the east of the road to Dalmau. It is on high ground and is drained by two large streams that merge further south before joining the Ganges.

As of 2011, Bahai has a population of 9,368 people, in 1,615 households. It has three primary schools and one veterinary hospital but no medical clinic for humans. It hosts no regular or periodic markets.

== History ==
Bahai was one of the original tappas that made up the pargana of Dalmau, as designated in the early 1400s by Ibrahim Shah of the Jaunpur Sultanate.

In the meanwhile Moughal Dynesty in 1394 the King Daalbir's brother king Baalbir was also residing in fort of Bahai which as of now ruined. North of the fort a temple of "Baidano" Baba Mandir is situated on the bank of ancient pond. In the memory of king Baalbir later Baidano Baba yearly ceremony also organised by local popullac on coming Monday after Holika Dahan. Approx 10000 people gathering in Mela of Baidano Baba every year.

At the turn of the 20th century, Bahai was described as a large village that was mostly significant for its size. Its population in 1901 was 3,303 people, including a Muslim minority of 442. It had previously been held by the Sayyid taluqdars of Alipur Chakrai, but by this point had come under the Rana of Khajurgaon, except for 66 acres that were owned by a Brahmin zamindar.

The 1961 census recorded Bahai as comprising 16 hamlets, with a total population of 4,553 people (2,311 male and 2,242 female), in 869 households and 791 physical houses. The area of the village was given as 2,973 acres and it had a post office at that point.

The 1981 census recorded Bahai as having a population of 6,129 people and an area of 1,203.13 hectares. The main staple foods were listed as wheat and rice.
