= Didaur =

Dedaur Dedaur
- Village
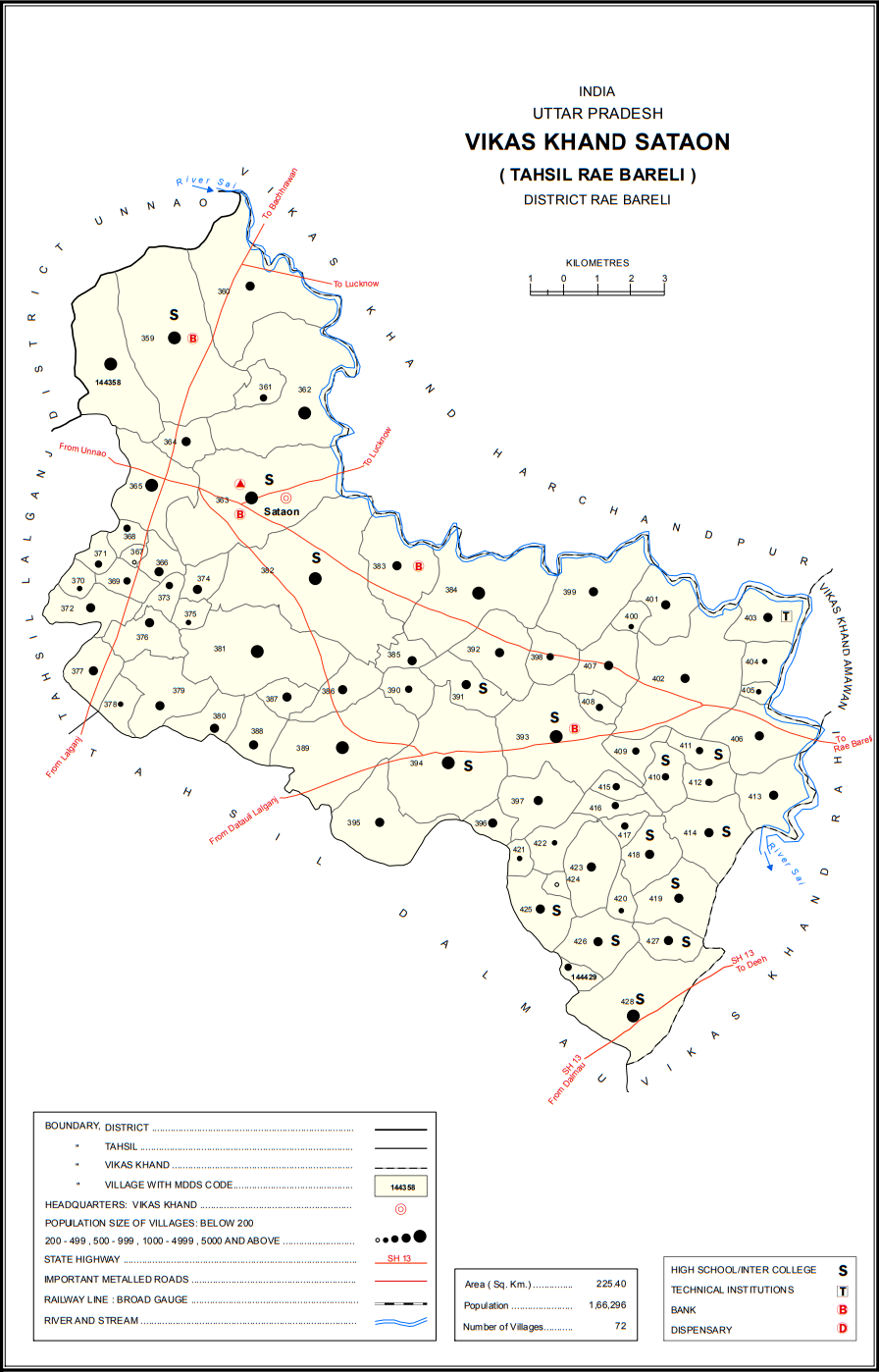
- Map showing Dedaur (#402) in Sataon CD block

- Location in Uttar Pradesh, India
- Coordinates: 26.243702°N 81.17456°E
- Country India: India
- State: Uttar Pradesh
- District: Raebareli

Area
  - Total: 9.83 km^{2} (3.80 sq mi)

Population (2011)
  - Total: 4,781
  - Density: 486/km^{2} (1,260/sq mi)

Languages
  - Official: Hindi
- Time zone: UTC+5:30 (IST)
- Vehicle registration: UP-33

Dedaur, is a village in Sataon block of Rae Bareli district, Uttar Pradesh, India. It is located 8 km from Raebareli on the road to Unnao, just east of the intersection with the road to Lalganj. It is near the right bank of the Sai River. As of 2011, Dedaur has a population of 4,781 people, in 900 households. Sunita Singh wife of Dinesh Chaudhary was elected Sarpanch of Dedaur for 15 years continuously from 2005-2021. The village hosts two annual festivals: one is the Badhwapur-ka-Mela, which is dedicated to the worship of Nag Devta and is held on Bhadra Sudi 5, and the other is the Jhurhapur-ka-Mela, which is dedicated to worship of Rama and falls on Phalguna Sudi 8.

== History ==
At the turn of the 20th century, Dedaur was described as a large but otherwise unremarkable village, held in taluqdari tenure by the Raja of Birsinghpur as part of the Simarpaha estate. The population in 1901 was 2,224, more than half of whom were Kurmis, and there was an aided school in the village.

The 1961 census recorded Didaur (as "Dedaur") as comprising 3 hamlets, with a total population of 2,125 people (1,119 male and 1,006 female), in 512 households and 496 physical houses. The area of the village was given as 2,475 acres and it had a post office and medical practitioner at that point. It also had one grain mill, one small miscellaneous food processing establishment, and one manufacturer/repairer of items not assignable to any group. Average attendance of the Badhwapur-ka-Mela and Jhurhapur-ka-Mela festivals was about 400 people each then.

The 1981 census recorded Didaur (as "Dedaur") as having a population of 3,406 people, in 609 households, and having an area of 1,012.96 hectares. The main staple foods were given as wheat and rice.

The most successful and longest Sarpanch remained from the family of Dinesh Chaudhary. He himself won the Panchayat Election in 2000 and was the Sarpanch from 2000-2005. After him, Sunita Singh (wife of Dinesh Chaudhary) won the panchayat election in 2005,2010 and 2015 for 3 consecutive times and remained Sarpanch till 2021. The same family gave the Sarpanch to the village for the longest time for this village i.e 2 decades.
