= Hullapur =

Hullapur Hullāpur
- Village
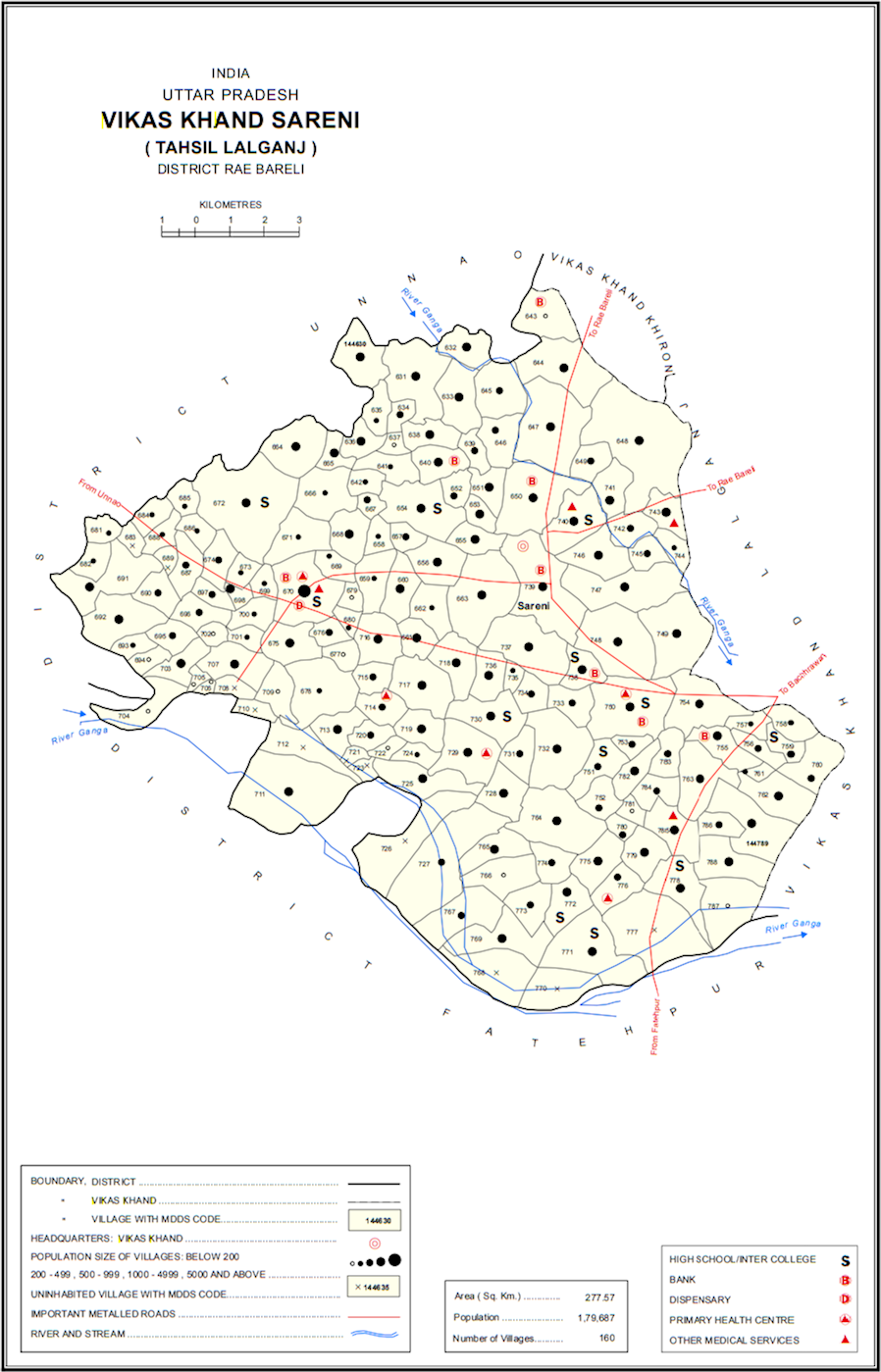
- Map showing Hullapur (#655) in Sareni CD block

- Location in Uttar Pradesh, India
- Coordinates: 26.161705°N 80.805736°E
- Country: India
- State: Uttar Pradesh
- District: Raebareli

Area
  - Total: 2.407 km^{2} (0.929 sq mi)

Population (2011)
  - Total: 1,864
  - Density: 774.4/km^{2} (2,006/sq mi)

Languages
  - Official: Hindi
- Time zone: UTC+5:30 (IST)
- Vehicle registration: UP-33

Hullapur is a village in Sareni block of Rae Bareli district, Uttar Pradesh, India. It is located 20 km from Lalganj, the tehsil headquarters. As of 2011, it has a population of 1,864 people, in 355 households. It has one primary school and no healthcare facilities.

== History ==
At the turn of the 20th century, Hullapur was one of only three villages in the Murarmau taluqdari estate that was directly controlled by the raja (the remainder of the estate was mortgaged to the Rana of Khajurgaon). The other two were Murarmau itself and Tiwaripur.

The 1951 census recorded Hullapur (as "Hullahpur") as comprising 3 hamlets, with a total population of 826 people (401 male and 425 female), in 187 households and 125 physical houses. The area of the village was given as 606 acres. 52 residents were literate, 47 male and 5 female. The village was listed as belonging to the pargana of Sareni and the thana of Sareni.

The 1961 census recorded Hullapur as comprising 3 hamlets, with a total population of 854 people (417 male and 437 female), in 157 households and 133 physical houses. The area of the village was given as 606 acres.

The 1981 census recorded Hullapur as having a population of 1,171 people, in 205 households, and having an area of 240.36 hectares. The main staple foods were given as wheat and rice.

The 1991 census recorded Hullapur as having a total population of 1,386 people (704 male and 682 female), in 256 households and 255 physical houses. The area of the village was listed as 143 hectares. Members of the 0-6 age group numbered 284, or 20% of the total; this group was 51% male (144) and 49% female (140). Members of scheduled castes made up 42% of the village's population, while no members of scheduled tribes were recorded. The literacy rate of the village was 34% (344 men and 122 women). 145 people were classified as main workers (336 men and 53 women), while 31 people were classified as marginal workers (2 men and 29 women); the remaining 966 residents were non-workers. The breakdown of main workers by employment category was as follows: 129 cultivators (i.e. people who owned or leased their own land); 166 agricultural labourers (i.e. people who worked someone else's land in return for payment); 0 workers in livestock, forestry, fishing, hunting, plantations, orchards, etc.; 0 in mining and quarrying; 0 household industry workers; 2 workers employed in other manufacturing, processing, service, and repair roles; 44 construction workers; 4 employed in trade and commerce; 3 employed in transport, storage, and communications; and 41 in other services.
