= Nari Khera =

- Village
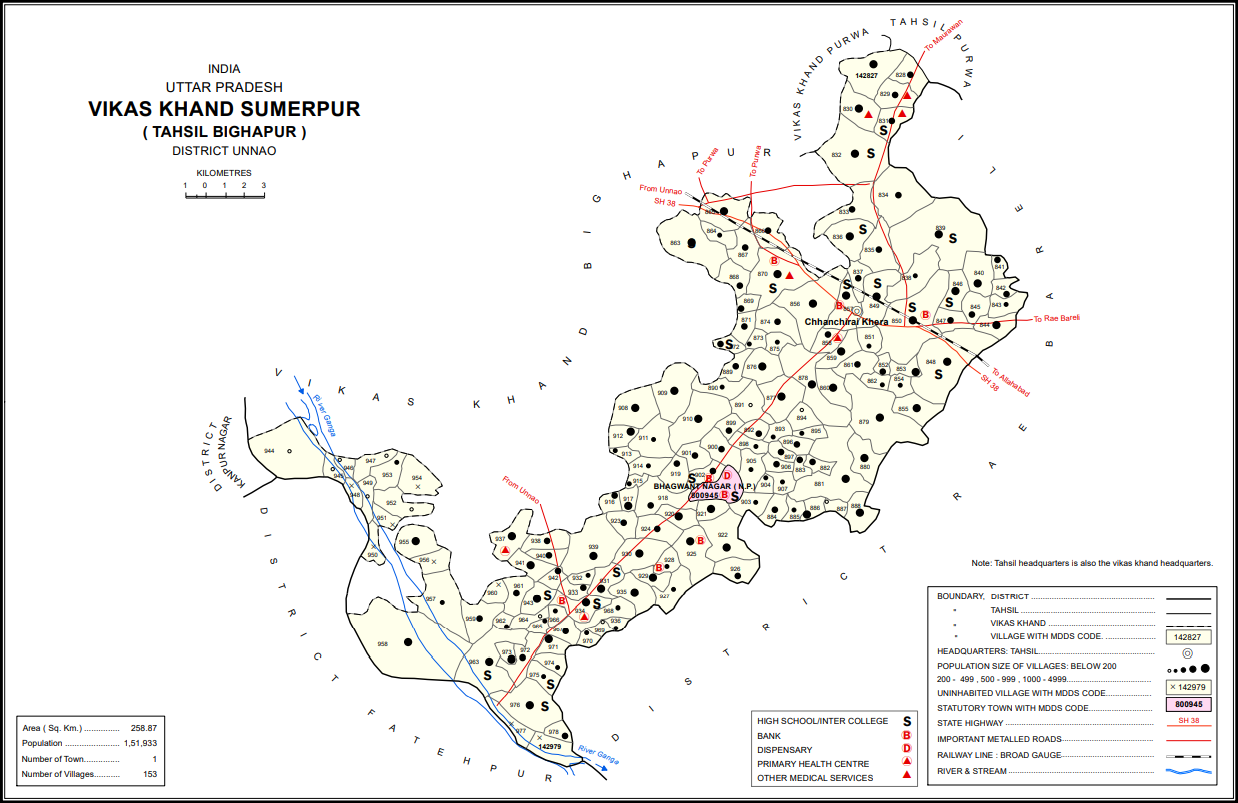
- Map showing Nari Khera (#883) in Sumerpur CD block

- Location in Uttar Pradesh, India
- Coordinates: 26.226024°N 80.792275°E
- Country India: India
- State: Uttar Pradesh
- District: Unnao

Area
  - Total: 0.891 km^{2} (0.344 sq mi)

Population (2011)
  - Total: 758
  - Density: 851/km^{2} (2,200/sq mi)

Languages
  - Official: Hindi
- Time zone: UTC+5:30 (IST)
- Vehicle registration: UP-35

Nari Khera is a village in Sumerpur block of Unnao district, Uttar Pradesh, India. As of 2011, its population is 758, in 130 households, and it has one primary school and no healthcare facilities.

The 1961 census recorded Nari Khera as comprising 1 hamlet, with a total population of 414 (197 male and 217 female), in 60 households and 58 physical houses. The area of the village was given as 224 acres.
