= Patan, Uttar Pradesh =

Patan Pātan
- Town
- Location in Unnao, Uttar Pradesh Patan (India)
- Coordinates: 26.30563°N 80.780703°E
- Country: India
- State: Uttar Pradesh
- District: Unnao

Government
  - Body: Gram panchayat

Area
  - Total: 4.595 km^{2} (1.774 sq mi)

Population
  - Total: 5,364
  - Density: 1,167/km^{2} (3,023/sq mi)

Languages
  - Official: Hindi
- Time zone: UTC+5:30 (IST)
- <-- PIN -->: 209506
- Vehicle registration: UP35
- Website: up.gov.in

Patan is a town in Sumerpur block of Unnao District in the state of Uttar Pradesh, India. Patan is located 16 km (10 mi) south of Purwa on the main Unnao-Allahabad road, and a short distance to the south of the Loni river. Part of the historical region of Baiswara, it historically gave its name to a pargana which existed since at least the time of Akbar, and under the Nawabs of Awadh it was the seat of a tehsil. The Rae Bareli-Kanpur branch of the Northern Railway zone runs through Patan, and the Takia train station is located in the village. A huge fair called the Takia-ka-Mela is held in Patan on the first Thursday in Paus, in honour of the saint Niamat Shah, revered by both Hindus and Muslims, drawing tens of thousands of visitors. A second fair, established by Muhabbat Shah's disciple Shafqat Shah, is also held in Muhabbat Shah's honour at the tomb on the first Thursday of Jeth.

In 2011 Patan had a population of 5,364 people, in 1,044 households. It serves as the seat of a nyaya panchayat and has a post office, a bus station, an intermediate college, a library, a temple dedicated to Lingeshwar Mahadeo, and the tomb of the 18th-century darvish Muhabbat Shah, which is where the Takia-ka-Mela is held. The village hosts a market twice per week, on Mondays and Fridays, where vegetables and cloth are sold.

== History ==
There is a large old mound in Patan, ascribed to the Bhars. Local tradition holds that the Bhars were the original rulers of the Patan area, before it came under control of the Bais Rajputs. Under the Mughal emperor Akbar, Patan gave its name to a pargana, which continued to exist into the 20th century.

Under the Nawabs of Awadh, Patan was the seat of a tehsil, with its headquarters on the western side of town. The tehsildar also had control over the town's thana (police station). The darvish Muhabbat Shah, who is buried in Patan, was a contemporary of the Nawab Shuja-ud-Daula. He supposedly first came to Patan on a pilgrimage. His tomb is now the site of two annual fairs; the larger, the Takia-ka-Mela, was supposedly inaugurated by Muhabbat Shah in honour of his favourite disciple, Niamat Shah, who is also buried here in the takya (graveyard). Muhabbat Shah is still venerated and his spirit is believed to cure possession; people used to perform exorcisms by tying up the afflicted person and leaving them in a tree near Muhabbat Shah's tomb overnight.

At the turn of the 20th century, Patan was described as a small town that was mostly significant for hosting the two fairs at Muhabbat Shah's tomb. It had an upper primary school with 60 students at the time. Its population was overwhelmingly Hindu — of the 2,545 residents recorded in the 1901 census, only 158 were Muslims.

The 1961 census recorded Patan as comprising 4 hamlets, with a total population of 2,159 people (1,082 male and 1,077 female), in 630 households and 420 physical houses. The area of the village was given as 1,137 acres. Average attendance of the Takia-ka-Mela fair was about 46,000 people at the time, while average attendance of the twice-weekly market was 1,000. The M.G. Higher Secondary School in Patan, established in 1952, had a faculty of 17 teachers (all male) and a student body of 463 (also all male) at the time. The village of Patan also had the following small industrial establishments at the time: 1 grain mill, 9 miscellaneous food processing facilities, 1 manufacturer of (non-chewing) tobacco products, 3 makers of textile garments, 7 makers of wood products not otherwise classified, 2 bicycle repair shops, 7 makers of jewellery and/or precious metal items, and 9 manufacturers and/or repairers of items not assigned to any group.

== Culture ==
Patan hosts two annual fairs at the tomb of Muhabbat Shah. One is the Takia-ka-Mela, which is held on the first Thursday of Paus in honour of Niamat Shah and which regularly draws tens of thousands of visitors, both Hindu and Muslim. Vendors bring agricultural implements, wooden items, glassware, cloth, sweets, toys, and miscellaneous other items to sell at the fair. The story goes that, one day, a Kurmi devotee of Muhabbat Shah fell down a well and cried out to Muhabbat Shah for help, believing him to be omnipresent, but to no avail. The Kurmi then cried out for Niamat Shah, who instantly appeared, took him by the hand, and helped him out of the well. When Muhabbat Shah found out about what happened, he was furious and commanded Niamat Shah to die, which he did. Muhabbat Shah then ordered a fair to be held in commemoration of Niamat Shah, over the latter's tomb.

A second fair is also held in honour of Muhabbat Shah on the first Thursday of Jeth. Originally inaugurated by Shafqat Shah, another of Muhabbat Shah's disciples, it regularly drew around 1,000 visitors around the middle of the 20th century.

== Agriculture ==
As of 2011, Patan village lands cover an area of 459.5 hectares (1,135 acres), of which 155.3 ha (384 acres) are farmland (another 80.7 ha (199 acres) are orchards). The main crops grown in Patan are wheat, barley, gram, juwar, bajra, and paddy. Of the total cultivated area, a majority (120.7 ha; 298 acres) are irrigated; irrigation is mostly provided by tube wells.
