= Sangrampur, Unnao =

Sangrampur Daundia Khera
- Village
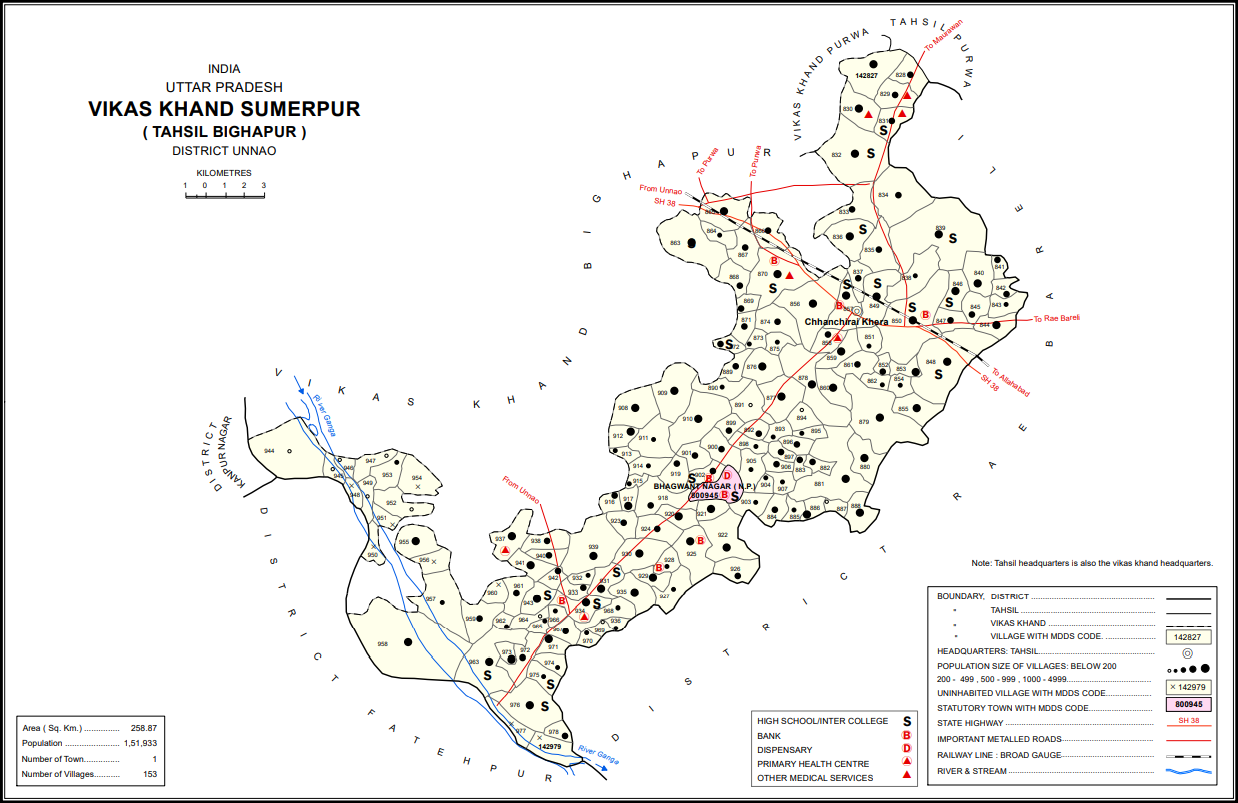
- Map showing Sangrampur (#963) in Sumerpur CD block

- Location in Uttar Pradesh, India
- Coordinates: 26°10′N 80°44′E
- Country India: India
- State: Uttar Pradesh
- District: Unnao

Area
  - Total: 5.248 km^{2} (2.026 sq mi)

Population (2011)
  - Total: 2,778
  - Density: 529.3/km^{2} (1,371/sq mi)

Languages
  - Official: Hindi
- Time zone: UTC+5:30 (IST)
- Vehicle registration: UP-35

Sangrampur, also called Daundia Khera, is a village in Sumerpur block of Unnao district, Uttar Pradesh, India. Located on the high bank of the Naurahi river a bit to the west of the main Unnao-Dalmau road, it is most notable for its historic importance as the capital of the Bais of Baiswada State. It was also the seat of a pargana beginning in the 1700s. As of 2011, its population is 2,778 in 530 households. It has four primary schools and no healthcare facilities.

== History ==
The traditional account of Sangrampur's founding is connected with the origins of the Bais of Baiswada. In 1191 Samvat, two Bais brothers named Abhai Chand and Pirthi Chand are said to have come to a bathing ceremony at the Shiurajpur ghat on the Ganges. Also present was the queen of Argal, accompanied by a few attendants and soldiers. The governor of the place attempted to rape her by force; her soldiers surrendered, and she cried out for help. The two brothers were able to successfully intervene, but Pirthi Chand was killed in the fight. When the queen's husband, the Raja of Argal, heard about what had happened, he "received the surviving brother, Abhai Chand, with much cordiality, [and] gave him his daughter in marriage, with the proprietorship of five villages as her dowry."

Abhai Chand went on to found the village of Abhaipur, across the Ganges from Sangrampur in what is now Fatehpur district. He then crossed the Ganges, where he fought a fierce battle against the Bhars who originally ruled the place; he named the site of the battle "Sangrampur", after the Sanskrit word sangrām, meaning battle or bloodshed.

When the famous Bais raja Tilok Chand died, he divided his lands between his sons Raja Pirthi Chand and Rana Harhardeo. Pirthi Chand inherited the western part of his father's lands and made his capital at the fort of Sangrampur. His descendants later included the cadet branch rajas of Murarmau and Purwa Ranbirpur.

The pargana of Daundia Khera did not exist at the time of the Ain-i-Akbari; its territory was at that time divided between the two mahals of Sidhupur (itself founded by one of the Bais rajas of Daundia Khera) and Unchgaon. It was created in the 1700s by Rao Mardan Singh, who joined them together into one pargana which he called Daundia Khera.

Babu Ram Baksh Singh, a descendant of Rao Mardan Singh, resided at a fort a bit to the north of Sangrampur; its ruins are still visible. He had been "constantly in opposition to the king's troops", and in 1849 his entire estate was put under the direct management of the nazim Sobha Singh. Ram Baksh Singh recovered the estate in 1850, but he "failed to pay the expected gratuity and was attacked and driven across the Ganges." His fort was destroyed and his lands were confiscated, although he later managed to buy them back. He was later hanged by the British at Baksar for his role in the Indian Rebellion of 1857, and his estates were confiscated.

At the turn of the 20th century, Daundia Khera had five temples and one school. Its population in 1901 was 990, including a Muslim minority of 101.

The 1961 census recorded Sangrampur as comprising 4 hamlets, with a total population of 916 (494 male and 422 female), in 215 households and 124 physical houses. The area of the village was given as 1,390 acres. It had medical practitioner at the time, as well as 1 small manufacturer of garments, 6 makers of earthenware pottery, and 3 makers of sundry hardwares.

== See also ==
- Unnao gold treasure incident, which took place here in 2013
