= Akthi =

- Village
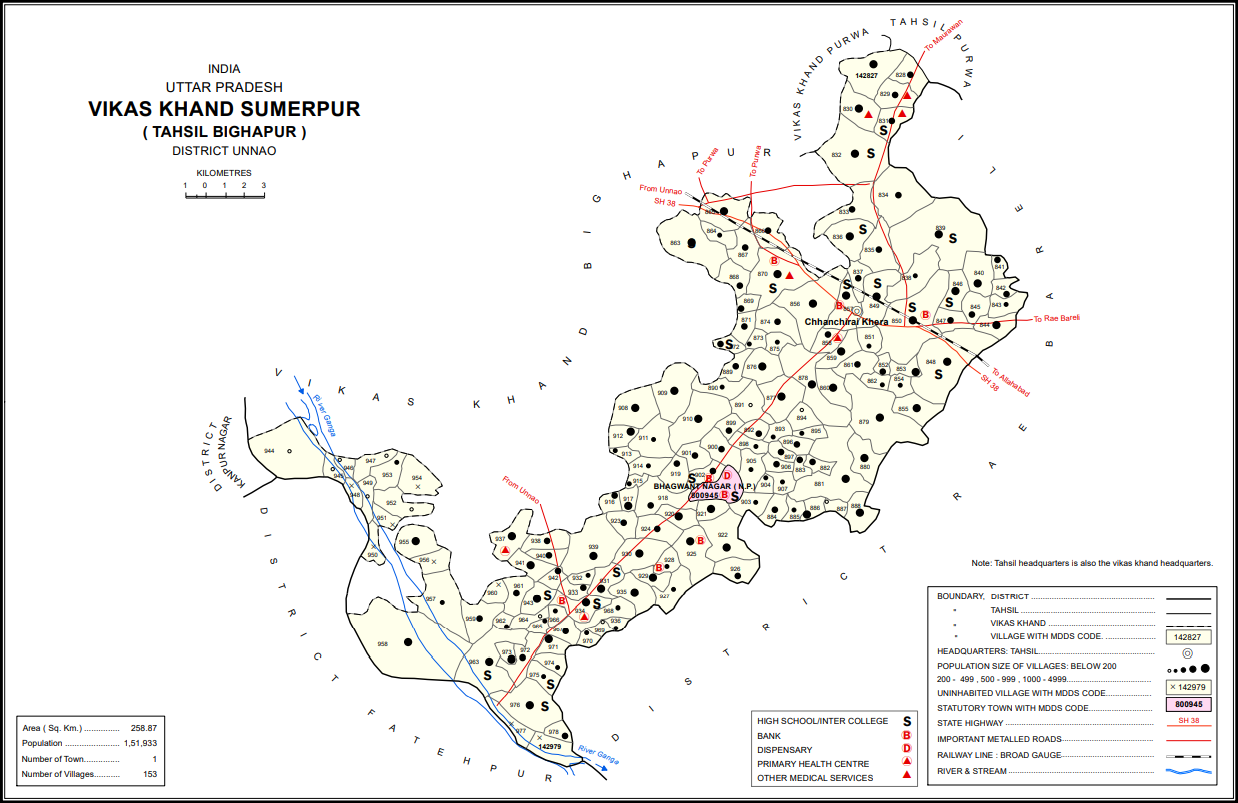
- Map showing Akthi (#896) in Sumerpur CD block

- Location in Uttar Pradesh, India
- Coordinates: 26.239129°N 80.794088°E
- Country India: India
- State: Uttar Pradesh
- District: Unnao

Area
  - Total: 0.932 km^{2} (0.360 sq mi)

Population (2011)
  - Total: 686
  - Density: 736/km^{2} (1,910/sq mi)

Languages
  - Official: Hindi
- Time zone: UTC+5:30 (IST)
- Vehicle registration: UP-35

Akthi is a village in Sumerpur block of Unnao district, Uttar Pradesh, India. As of 2011, its population is 686, in 114 households, and it has two primary schools and no healthcare facilities.

The 1961 census recorded Akthi (here spelled "Akathi") as comprising 1 hamlet, with a total population of 332 (193 male and 139 female), in 44 households and 44 physical houses. The area of the village was given as 231 acres.
