= Baise (disambiguation) =

Baise is a city in Guangxi, China.

Baise may also refer to:

- Baïse, river in south-western France
- Baise Rajya, a loose confederation of 22 petty kingdoms annexed to Nepal between 1744 and 1810 AD
- Festus Baise (born 1980), a Hong Kong professional footballer
- Louis Baise (1927–2020), South African Olympic wrestler
- Byse, Shimoga, India

== See also ==
- Bais (disambiguation)
