= Sumerpur, Unnao =

Sumerpur
- Hamlet
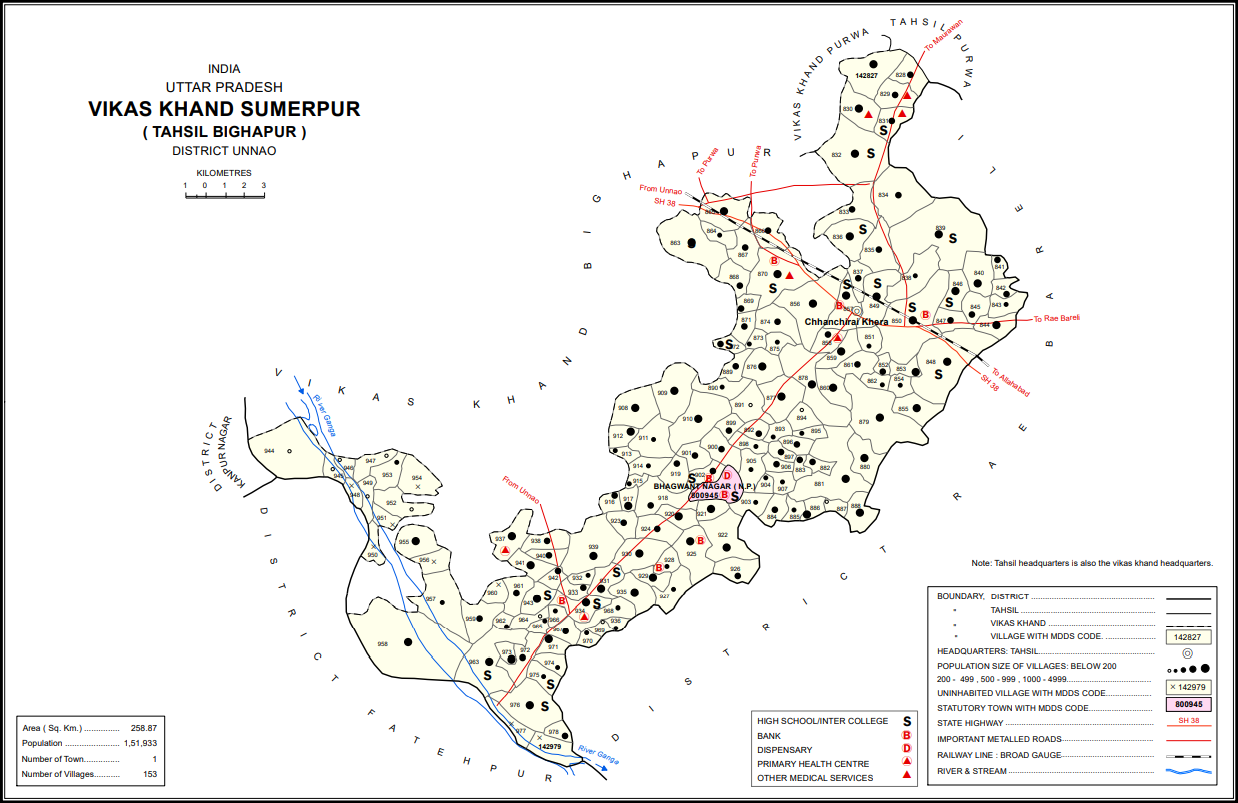
- Map of Sumerpur CD block

- Location in Uttar Pradesh, India
- Coordinates: 26.281116°N 80.802436°E
- Country India: India
- State: Uttar Pradesh
- District: Unnao

Languages
  - Official: Hindi
- Time zone: UTC+5:30 (IST)
- Vehicle registration: UP-35

Sumerpur is a hamlet of the village Chhanchhi Rai Khera, in Purwa tehsil of Unnao district, Uttar Pradesh, India. Located 26 km south of Purwa and 50 km southeast of Unnao, Sumerpur serves as the headquarters of a community development block as well as a nyaya panchayat. Sumerpur block was first established on 2 October 1955 in order to oversee implementation of India's Five-Year Plans at a local and rural level. As of 2011, the block comprises 148 villages and has a total population of 151,933 people in 28,469 households.

Sumerpur has a library, a primary healthcare centre, an artificial insemination centre, and a veterinary hospital. The main crops are wheat, barley, gram, juwar, bajra, and paddy. Irrigation is provided by a canal and by wells. Sumerpur is located in the historical pargana of Bihar, which is 4 km to the northeast and connected to Sumerpur by an unmetalled road.

Sumerpur hosts a market twice per week, on Thursdays and Sundays, with vegetables and cloth being the main items of business. As of 1961, its average attendance was about 300 people.

== Villages ==
Sumerpur CD block has the following 148 villages:

Village name	Total land area (hectares)	Population (in 2011)
Pakrakhurd	455.8	2,395
Barua	127.3	528
Saraiya	149.8	548
Khijhauli	220.2	1,242
Kotwar	141.4	877
Malauna	599.6	4,029
Bhagwantpur	234.1	521
Diwara	399.8	818
Hindhnagar	160.3	845
Purai	240.8	2,905
Kundunpur	96.2	612
Hindupur	82	414
Gaura	748	3,948
Pokhari	188.3	1,350
Niyoti	84.5	564
Bisramau	84.7	856
Bijaiti Khera	43	330
Kutubpur	252.3	1,693
Behta	82	536
Sahila	382	2,339
Mavaiya	116.9	696
Akampur	486.1	2,107
Rawatpur	219.5	1,439
Behar	622.6	5,952
Kedarkhera	131.7	480
Rampur	79.6	651
Bajeura	57	1,106
Chakdariyapur	60.5	203
Siriyapur	177.2	1,150
Kalyanpur	359.7	1,490
Chhanchirai Khera	233.4	1,437
Barkhera	107.7	953
Kiratpur	123.8	1,257
Kalyani	235	1,320
Tajakpur	171	989
Naya Khera	32.6	291
Dubai	348.4	2,139
Murarkhera	97.8	299
Kakrari	248.5	1,492
Gadariyakhera	124.5	623
Chandpur	84.9	671
Atmannukhera	166.9	772
Dewakhera	96.8	555
Patan	459.5	5,364
Dighi	66.1	555
Bazidpur	86	656
Mohkampur	55.9	340
Alawalpur	151.2	792
Thari	91.7	403
Rampur	79.6	1,213
Manikapur	0	4,750
Sarai Manihar	309.3	1,919
Jamipur	671.1	3,140
Mawayia	215.4	1,059
Chainpur	661.5	3,866
Taudhakpur	68.1	781
Nari Khera	89.1	758
Sarai Mangali	121.2	626
Millipur	49.8	268
Jalapur	185.8	1,204
Harpasi Khera	55.3	44
Dubey Khera	191.8	1,346
Sajhamau	164	985
Purender Pur	137	473
Chak Bhagan Khera	0	173
Bhatkherwa	0	507
Kurwan	52.7	405
Narharpur	84.7	96
Mushkabad	60.8	301
Akthi	93.2	686
Hariharpur	49.6	532
Kapurpur	116.5	475
Sultanpur	0	656
Bhaiya Khera	98.1	911
Paharpur	138.5	908
Patari	68.7	773
Garehwa	255.1	457
Asai Khera	62.9	318
Bhadiha	84	307
Jungal Bujurg	76.2	513
Jangli Khurd	76.2	446
Maheshkhera	228.2	1,218
Naikamau	290.2	1,716
Panai Buzurg	367.1	2,171
Ajutikhera	96.8	469
Panai Khurd	277	1,419
Gosai Khera	53.8	300
Sairampur	64.5	202
Birarmau	36.6	291
Chaturkhera	73.3	824
Dokrai	129.7	1,353
Bajpaikhera	214.8	834
Akwara	81.9	637
Pithai Khera Sagam Nora	200.8	1,096
Gobaraha	105.9	1,420
Hamirpur	432.3	2,634
Dharamdas Khera	121.9	777
Mudiyankhera	174.2	666
Japsara	208	1,586
Pitwakhera	99.7	539
Bairampur	80.7	354
Lilia	52.2	282
Sawain	92.8	1,499
Bhadeora	268.1	1,591
Babukhera Dixtanwala	132.8	1,026
Palhepur	76.9	254
Pachan Khera	441.7	596
Unchgaon	247	1,773
Gauraiya	175.1	1,349
Baidan Khera	41.2	324
Ahraura	174.4	1,358
Racholiya	119.9	735
Dhankauli	427.7	3,181
Daudapur	58	624
Kundrabakht Khera	149.7	1,003
Kanthi	74.2	722
Mubarakpur	171.6	1,376
Chautarikalan Gairmustahkam	150.3	29
Chautari Kalan Mustahkam	157.2	13
Dhanpati Khera Mustahkam	70.2	0
Purikhera Mustahkam	81.9	9
Purikhera Gairmustahkam	75.2	0
Dhanpati Khera Gairmustahkam	124	0
Sethupur Gairahetmali	149.1	1,512
Sherhupurahtmali	195	0
Dharampur	537	381
Dulikhera	1,319	3,030
Rasulpur Darigaon	72.4	569
Chaksangrampur	5.8	0
Hisyampur	118.8	838
Rukunpur	35.5	257
Sangrampur	524.8	2,778
Mohammad Pur	48	156
Tandaspur	36.8	336
Nanmau	37.9	493
Naraindas Khera	95	841
Narainpur	47.8	395
Chakthanpur	20	7
Nathai Khera	60.4	463
Ramnair	115.2	1,598
Kalyanpur	111.3	751
Jagatpur	103.4	1,075
Anuikhera	24.8	371
Tangapur	76.9	376
Baksar	365.5	2,413
Katribaxer	218.5	0
Malepurmustahkam	74.9	795
Katari Bhalepur	413.6	0
