= Malauna =

- Village
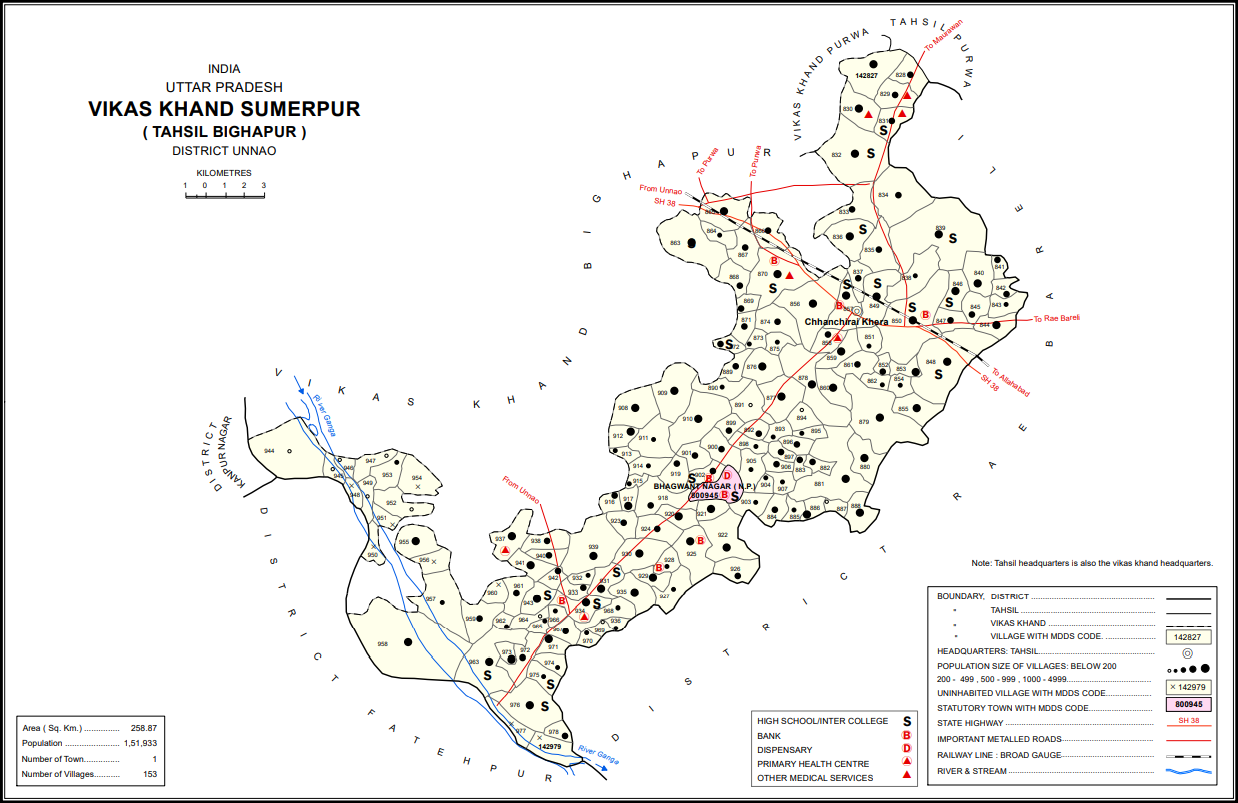
- Map showing Malauna (#832) in Sumerpur CD block

- Location in Uttar Pradesh, India
- Coordinates: 26.343384°N 80.81695°E
- Country India: India
- State: Uttar Pradesh
- District: Unnao

Area
  - Total: 5.996 km^{2} (2.315 sq mi)

Population (2011)
  - Total: 4,029
  - Density: 671.9/km^{2} (1,740/sq mi)

Languages
  - Official: Hindi
- Time zone: UTC+5:30 (IST)
- Vehicle registration: UP-35

Malauna is a village in Sumerpur block of Unnao district, Uttar Pradesh, India. As of 2011, its population is 4,029, in 741 households, and it has two primary schools and no healthcare facilities.

The 1961 census recorded Malauna as comprising 6 hamlets, with a total population of 1,065 (580 male and 485 female), in 385 households and 305 physical houses. The area of the village was given as 1,519 acres. It had the following small industrial establishments at the time: 4 makers of edible fats/oils, 2 makers of miscellaneous wood products, 2 makers of earthenware pottery, and 1 maker of sundry hardwares.
