= Akampur =

Akampur Ākampur
- Village
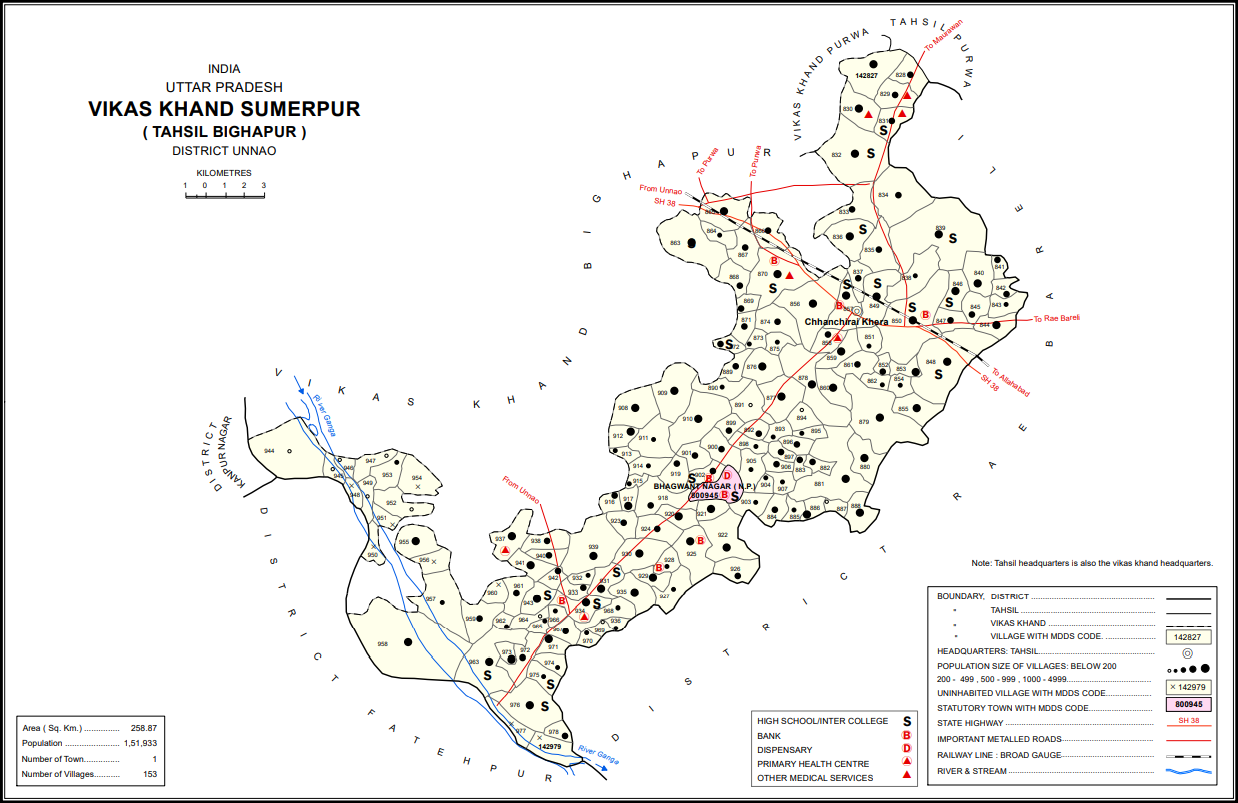
- Map showing Akampur (#848) in Sumerpur CD block

- Location in Uttar Pradesh, India
- Coordinates: 26.262895°N 80.847688°E
- Country India: India
- State: Uttar Pradesh
- District: Unnao

Area
  - Total: 4.861 km^{2} (1.877 sq mi)

Population (2011)
  - Total: 2,107
  - Density: 433.4/km^{2} (1,123/sq mi)

Languages
  - Official: Hindi
- Time zone: UTC+5:30 (IST)
- Vehicle registration: UP-35

Akampur is a village in Sumerpur block of Unnao district, Uttar Pradesh, India. As of 2011, its population was 2,107, in 380 households. It has one primary school and no healthcare facilities.

The 1961 census recorded Akampur as comprising 2 hamlets, with a total population of 882 (478 male and 404 female), in 210 households and 180 physical houses. The area of the village was given as 1,231 acres, and it had a medical practitioner at the time. It had the following small industrial establishments at the time: 1 maker of miscellaneous wood products, 1 maker of earthenware pottery, 5 makers of sundry hardwares, and 2 makers of jewellery or precious metal objects.
