= Gaura, Unnao =

Gaura
- Village
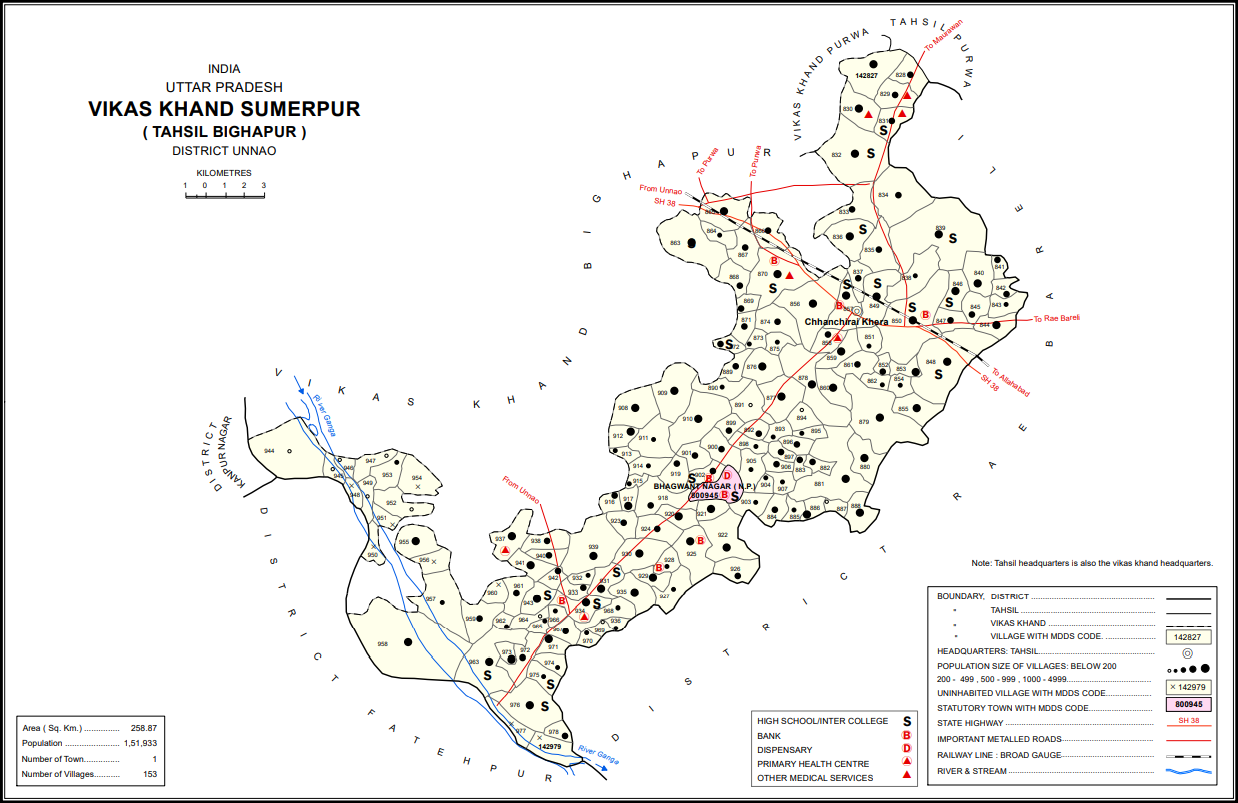
- Map showing Gaura (#839) in Sumerpur CD block

- Location in Uttar Pradesh, India
- Coordinates: 26.321345°N 80.853663°E
- Country India: India
- State: Uttar Pradesh
- District: Unnao

Area
  - Total: 7.48 km^{2} (2.89 sq mi)

Population (2011)
  - Total: 3,948
  - Density: 528/km^{2} (1,370/sq mi)

Languages
  - Official: Hindi
- Time zone: UTC+5:30 (IST)
- Vehicle registration: UP-35

Gaura is a village in Sumerpur block of Unnao district, Uttar Pradesh, India. As of 2011, its population is 3,948, in 724 households, and it has one primary school and no healthcare facilities.

The 1961 census recorded Gaura as comprising 6 hamlets, with a total population of 1,597 (802 male and 795 female), in 321 households and 291 physical houses. The area of the village was given as 1,825 acres.
