= Sarai Manihar =

Sarai Manihar Sarāi Manihār
- Village
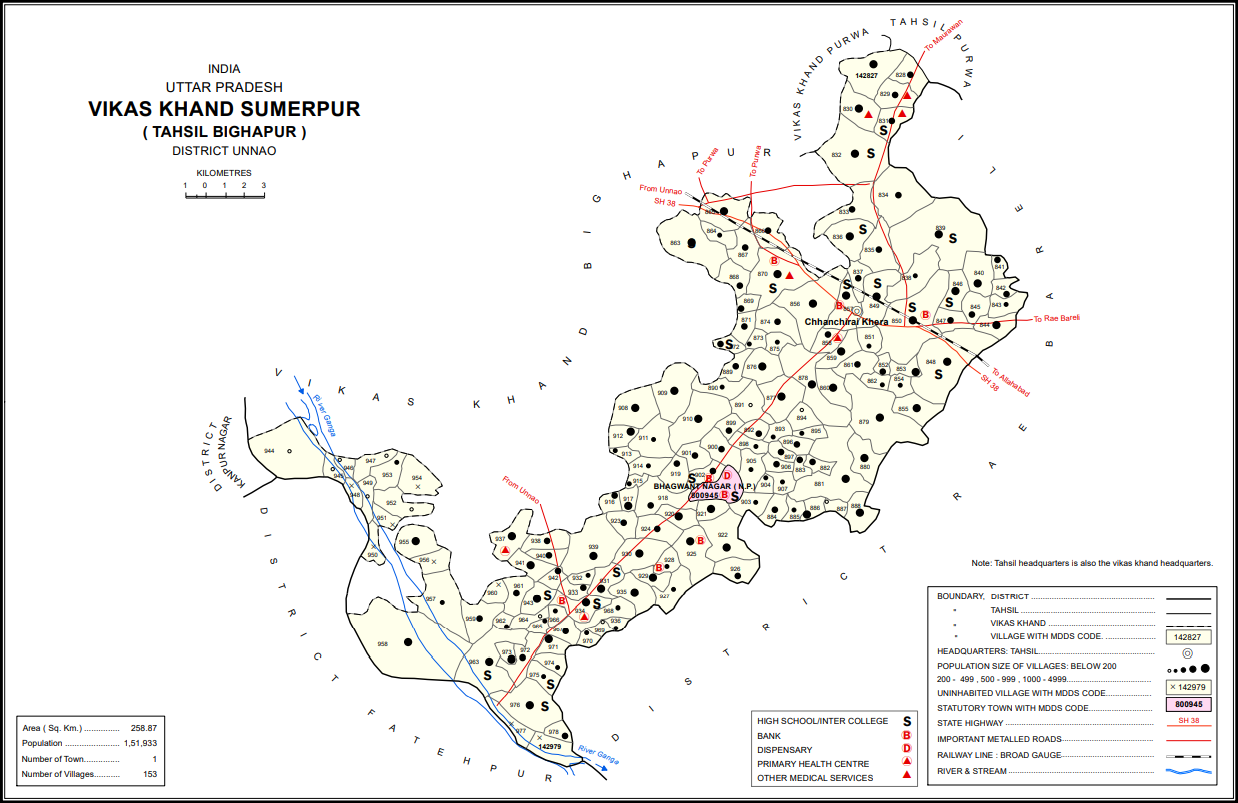
- Map showing Sarai Manihar (#878) in Sumerpur CD block

- Location in Uttar Pradesh, India
- Coordinates: 26.273652°N 80.792759°E
- Country India: India
- State: Uttar Pradesh
- District: Unnao

Area
  - Total: 3.093 km^{2} (1.194 sq mi)

Population (2011)
  - Total: 1,919
  - Density: 620.4/km^{2} (1,607/sq mi)

Languages
  - Official: Hindi
- Time zone: UTC+5:30 (IST)
- Vehicle registration: UP-35

Sarai Manihar is a village in Sumerpur block of Unnao district, Uttar Pradesh, India. As of 2011, its population is 1,919, in 352 households, and it has two primary schools and no healthcare facilities.

The 1961 census recorded Sarai Manihar (here spelled "Sarai Manhar") as comprising 4 hamlets, with a total population of 716 (372 male and 344 female), in 239 households and 171 physical houses. The area of the village was given as 754 acres.
