= Jamipur =

- Village
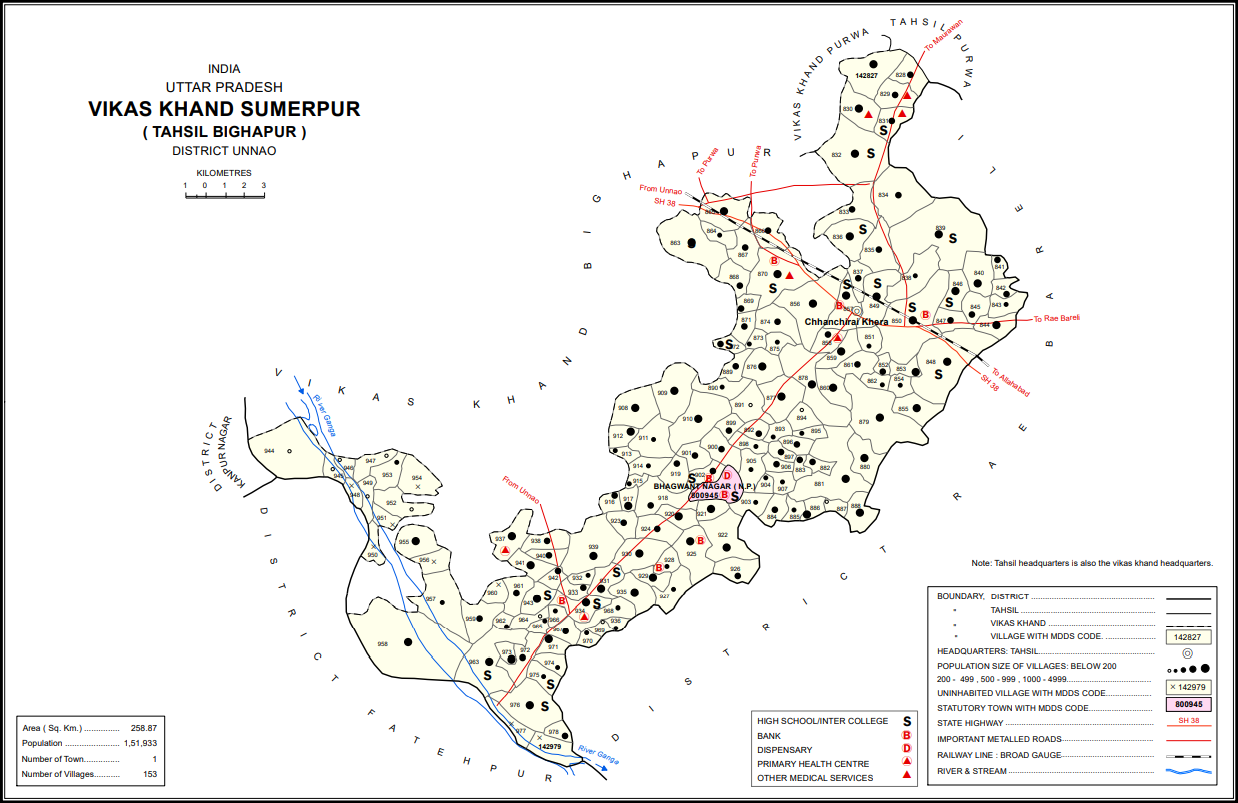
- Map showing Jamipur (#879) in Sumerpur CD block

- Location in Uttar Pradesh, India
- Coordinates: 26.24772°N 80.823406°E
- Country India: India
- State: Uttar Pradesh
- District: Unnao

Area
  - Total: 6.711 km^{2} (2.591 sq mi)

Population (2011)
  - Total: 3,140
  - Density: 468/km^{2} (1,210/sq mi)

Languages
  - Official: Hindi
- Time zone: UTC+5:30 (IST)
- Vehicle registration: UP-35

Jamipur is a village in Sumerpur block of Unnao district, Uttar Pradesh, India. As of 2011, its population is 3,140, in 588 households, and it has two primary schools and no healthcare facilities.

The 1961 census recorded Jamipur as comprising 12 hamlets, with a total population of 1,255 (511 male and 744 female), in 240 households and 225 physical houses. The area of the village was given as 1,670 acres, and it had a medical practitioner at the time.
