= Murarmau =

Murarmau Murārmau
- Village
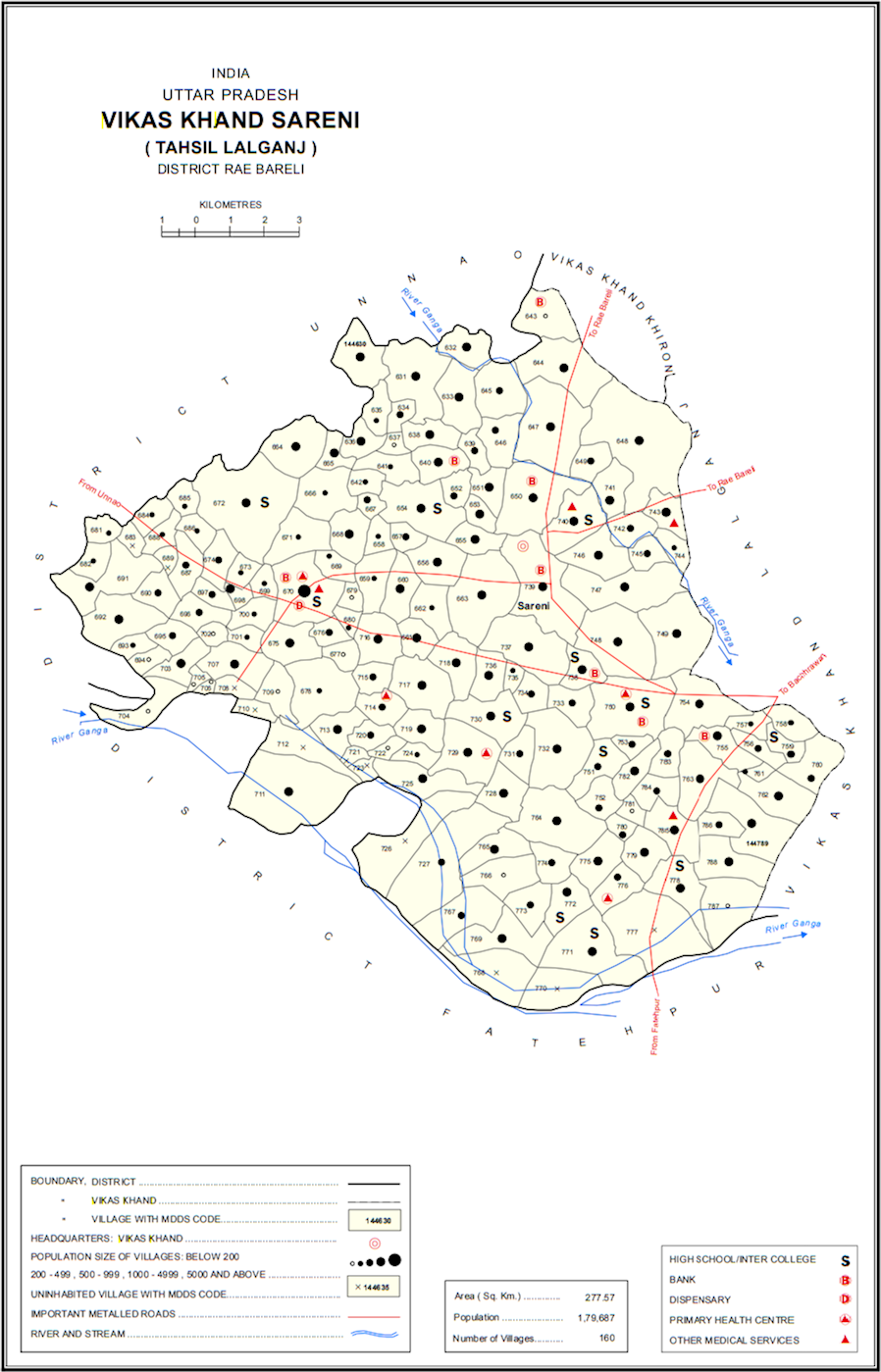
- Map showing Murarmau (#654) in Sareni CD block

- Location in Uttar Pradesh, India
- Coordinates: 26.166187°N 80.793369°E
- Country: India
- State: Uttar Pradesh
- District: Raebareli

Area
  - Total: 3.361 km^{2} (1.298 sq mi)

Population (2011)
  - Total: 2,999
  - Density: 892.3/km^{2} (2,311/sq mi)

Languages
  - Official: Hindi
- Time zone: UTC+5:30 (IST)
- Vehicle registration: UP-35

Murarmau is a village in Sareni block of Rae Bareli district, Uttar Pradesh, India. It is located 21 km from Lalganj, the tehsil headquarters. Murarmau historically served as the seat of the largest taluqdar estate in the district, held by the most senior branch of the Tilokchandi Bais. As of 2011, it has a population of 2,999 people, in 523 households. It has one primary school and no healthcare facilities. Murarmau serves as the headquarters of a nyaya panchayat which also includes 9 other villages.

Murarmau hosts the Thakur Dwara cattle fair annually on Chaitra Badi 9. It also hosts a regular market twice per week, on Wednesdays and Saturdays; vegetables and cloth are the main items traded.

== History ==
The Rajas of Murarmau were the most senior branch of the Tilokchandi Bais, who were descended from the powerful Raja Tilok Chand. He had two sons; the older one, Pirthi Chand, established himself at the ancestral fort of Sangrampur, and the Rajas of Murarmau were among his descendants. The estate was split several generations later, when either his grandson Deo Rai or his great-grandson Bhairon Das established the Daundia Khera line, while the elder branch ruled from Murarmau.

At the time of Aurangzeb, Amar Singh of Murarmau was constantly at war with Rao Purandar Singh of Daundia Khera. Amar Singh was usually defeated in these conflicts. After his death, the Murarmau estate declined precipitously: his infant son Raja Debi Singh was left in the guardianship of his uncle Gopal Singh, who acquired most of the lands for himself. The Rajkumar branch that Gopal Singh founded would control almost the entire estate until the mid-19th century. As an adult, Debi Singh successfully petitioned the Mughal emperor for support in recovering his estate, but the firman he obtained was essentially useless at establishing authority over his Rajkumar relatives.

Drigbijai Singh, the 6th-generation descendant of Amar Singh, managed to recover several villages before the Indian Rebellion of 1857, but his prosperity reached its peak afterward, when the British rewarded him for his allegiance during the conflict. He had sheltered British fugitives from the Siege of Cawnpore at his residence in Murarmau, and in turn he was granted the confiscated Daundia Khera estate that had belonged to the rebel-aligned Ram Bakhsh Singh, as well as part of the taluqa of Shankarpur. However, the Murarmau dynasty fell on hard times again, and most of the estate was mortgaged to the Rana of Khajurgaon by around 1900. Only 3 villages remained under the Raja's direct control: Murarmau itself, Tiwaripur, and Hullapur.

At the turn of the 20th century, Murarmau was described as a small village that was mostly significant for being the headquarters of the estate. The raja's residence was in the dismantled fort built by Siddha Rai. Its population in 1901 was 460 people, mostly Brahmins.

The 1951 census recorded Murarmau (as "Murar Mau") as comprising 8 hamlets, with a total population of 1,214 people (627 male and 587 female), in 236 households and 208 physical houses. The area of the village was given as 832 acres. 43 residents were literate, 38 male and 5 female. The village was listed as belonging to the pargana of Sareni and the thana of Sareni.

The 1961 census recorded Murarmau as comprising 8 hamlets, with a total population of 1,324 people (663 male and 661 female), in 248 households and 219 physical houses. The area of the village was given as 832 acres and it had a medical practitioner and a post office at that point. Average attendance of the Thakur Dwara fair was about 3,000 people, while attendance of the regular market was about 100.

The 1981 census recorded Murarmau as having a population of 1,691 people, in 329 households, and having an area of 335.89 hectares. The main staple foods were given as wheat and rice.

The 1991 census recorded Murarmau (as "Murar Mau") as having a total population of 2,096 people (1,096 male and 1,000 female), in 386 households and 383 physical houses. The area of the village was listed as 336 hectares. Members of the 0-6 age group numbered 421, or 20% of the total; this group was 49% male (205) and 51% female (216). Members of scheduled castes made up 19% of the village's population, while no members of scheduled tribes were recorded. The literacy rate of the village was 30% (541 men and 96 women). 551 people were classified as main workers (541 men and 10 women), while 124 people were classified as marginal workers (1 man and 123 women); the remaining 1,421 residents were non-workers. The breakdown of main workers by employment category was as follows: 261 cultivators (i.e. people who owned or leased their own land); 153 agricultural labourers (i.e. people who worked someone else's land in return for payment); 1 worker in livestock, forestry, fishing, hunting, plantations, orchards, etc.; 0 in mining and quarrying; 0 household industry workers; 15 workers employed in other manufacturing, processing, service, and repair roles; 1 construction worker; 23 employed in trade and commerce; 3 employed in transport, storage, and communications; and 94 in other services.
