= Jangal Khurd =

- Village
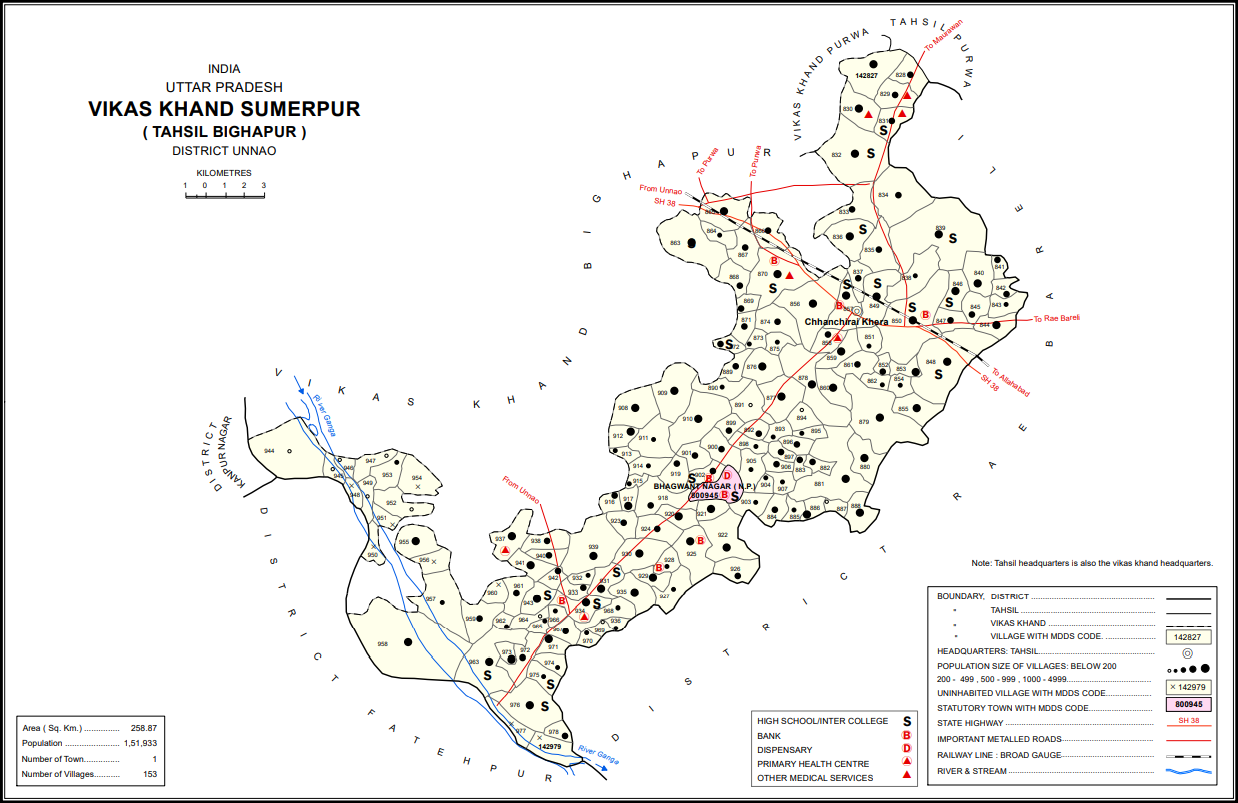
- Map showing Jangal Khurd (#907) in Sumerpur CD block

- Location in Uttar Pradesh, India
- Coordinates: 26.224123°N 80.783306°E
- Country India: India
- State: Uttar Pradesh
- District: Unnao

Area
  - Total: 0.762 km^{2} (0.294 sq mi)

Population (2011)
  - Total: 446
  - Density: 585/km^{2} (1,520/sq mi)

Languages
  - Official: Hindi
- Time zone: UTC+5:30 (IST)
- Vehicle registration: UP-35

Jangal Khurd is a village in Sumerpur block of Unnao district, Uttar Pradesh, India. As of 2011, its population is 446 people, making up 93 households. It has one primary school and no healthcare facilities.

The 1961 census recorded Jangal Khurd as comprising 1 hamlet, with a total population of 225 (129 male and 96 female), in 40 households and 40 physical houses. The area of the village was given as 189 acres.
