= Bais =

Bais may refer to:

- Bais Rajput, a Rajput clan of India
- Bais (wine), a traditional alcoholic drink made from honey from the Mandaya and Manobo people of the Philippines
- Bais, Negros Oriental, a city in the Philippines
- Bais, Ille-et-Vilaine, a commune of the Ille-et-Vilaine département, in France
- Bais, Mayenne, a commune of the Mayenne département, in France
- Anjhula Mya Bais, psychologist, feminist, former model and life coach
- Bais, a river in Madhya Pradesh, India, on which the city of Vidisha is settled
- BAIS or Badan Intelijen Strategis, the military intelligence of Indonesian National Armed Forces

== See also ==
- Bai (disambiguation)
- Baise (disambiguation)
- Bayas (disambiguation)
