= Dubai, Unnao =

Dubai
- Village
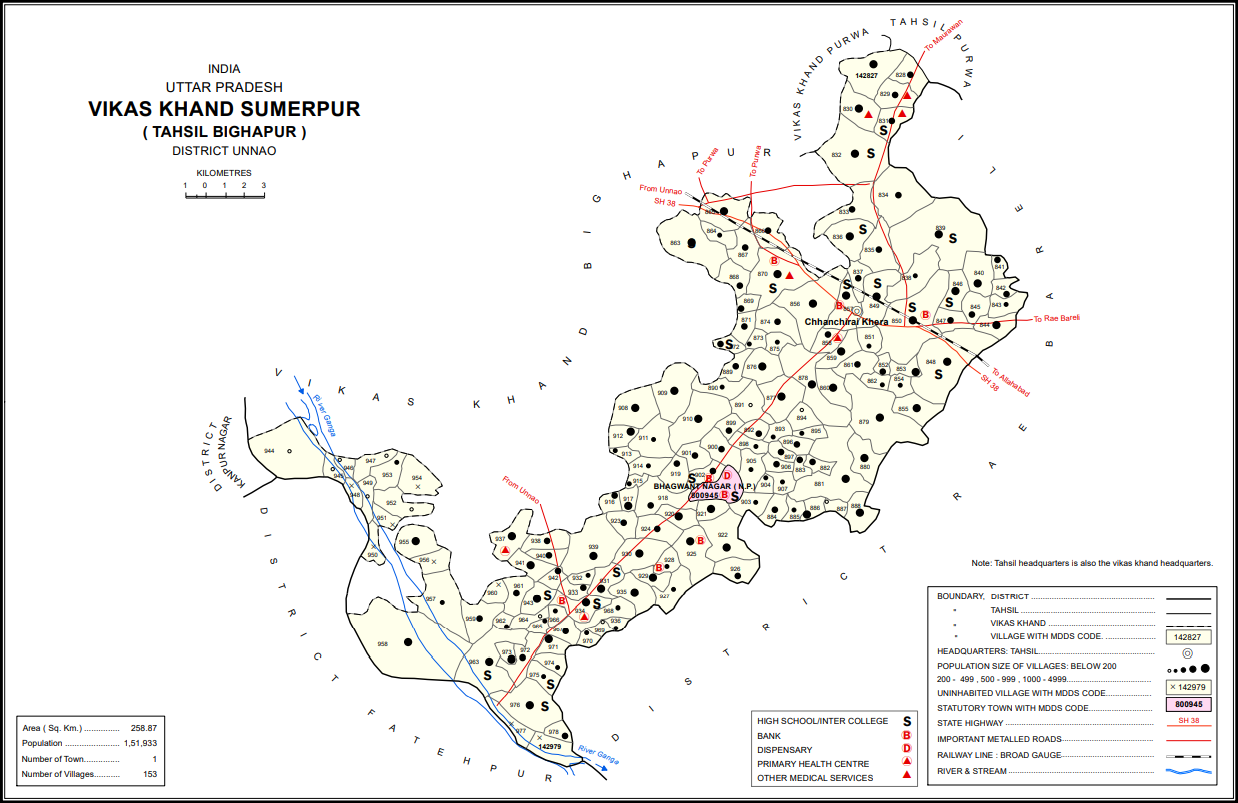
- Map showing Dubai (#863) in Sumerpur CD block

- Location in Uttar Pradesh, India
- Coordinates: 26.312054°N 80.751725°E
- Country India: India
- State: Uttar Pradesh
- District: Unnao

Area
  - Total: 3.484 km^{2} (1.345 sq mi)

Population (2011)
  - Total: 2,139
  - Density: 613.9/km^{2} (1,590/sq mi)

Languages
  - Official: Hindi
- Time zone: UTC+5:30 (IST)
- Vehicle registration: UP-35

Dubai is a village in Sumerpur block of Unnao district, Uttar Pradesh, India. As of 2011, its population is 2,139, in 410 households, and it has one primary school and no healthcare facilities.

The 1961 census recorded Dubai as comprising 3 hamlets, with a total population of 971 (470 male and 501 female), in 199 households and 156 physical houses. The area of the village was given as 841 acres.
