= Baiswada State =

Former princely state of India

Baiswada State बैसवाड़ा राज्य
- 1216–1947
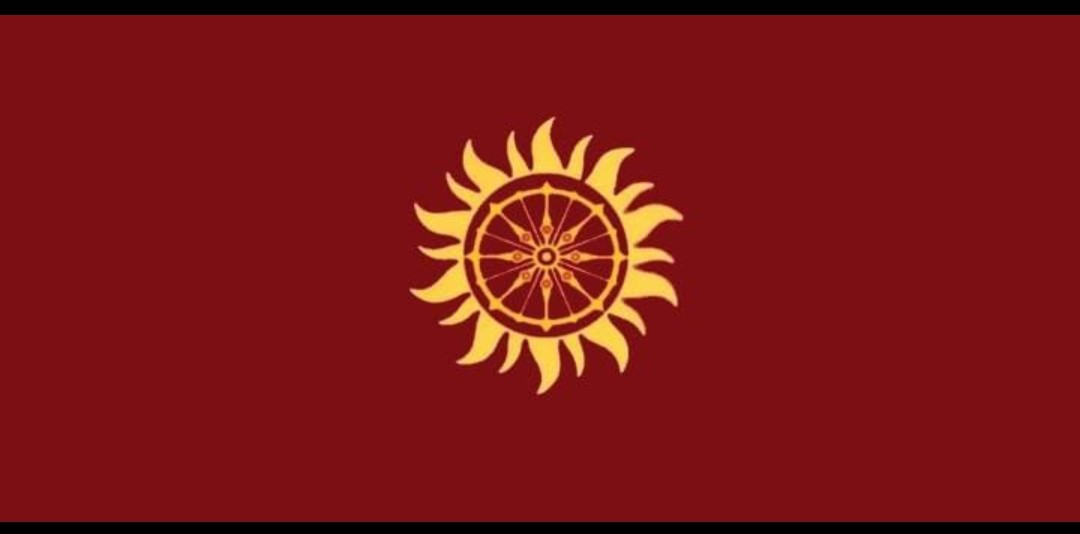
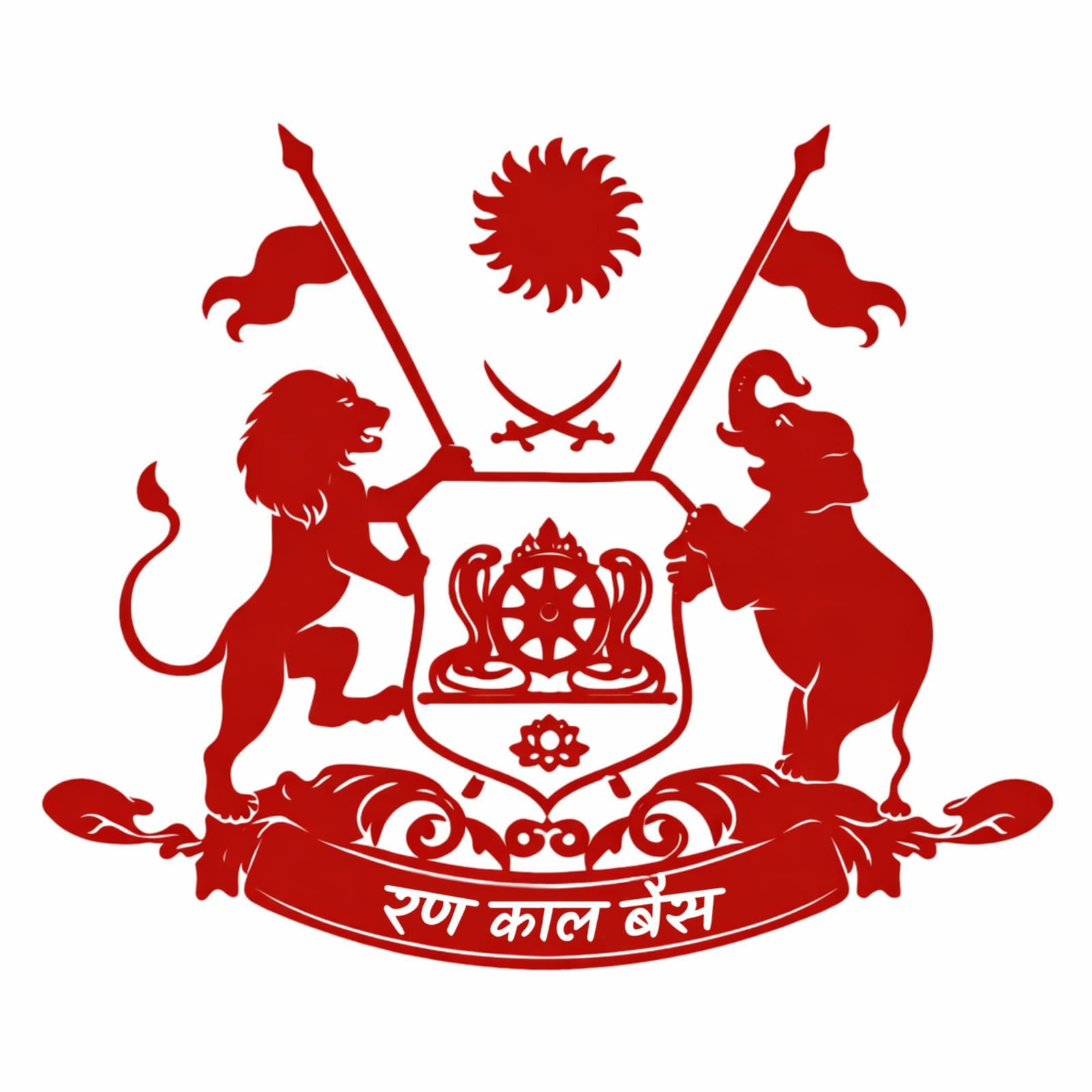
- Flag Coat of arms
- Capital: Daundia Kheda (Sangrampur, Unnao)
- Demonym: Bais
- Area
  - 1901: 69,100 km^{2} (26,700 sq mi)
- Population
  - 1901: 200,146,754
- Government
  - Type: Absolute Monarchy
- Historical era: 12th century
  - Established: 1216
  - Accession to Dominion of India: 1947
Succeeded by
Dominion of India
- Today part of: Uttar Pradesh, Republic of India

Baiswada State, also called Kingdom of Baiswada, was one of the States of India in Awadh region. Baiswada got its name because Bais Rajputs dominated this area. It was founded by Rao Abhaychandra Bais, from the 25th generation of Samrat Harsh Vardhan Bais of Thanesar. The capital of Baiswada was Daundia Kheda (Sangrampur).

== History ==
Keshav Rai, alias Ganesh Rai, the ruler of Lohaganj died in the battle of Chandawar on behalf of Raja Jaichand against Muhammad Ghori. H sons Nirbhaychand and Abhaychand, along with their mother, went to Sialkot in Punjab. Living in secret, the two princes returned to their homeland when they grew up. Around the year 1230, the Gautamvanshi king of Argal was attacked by the Muslim Subedar of Kada, but Gautam Raja defeated him. After some time Gautam Raja's wife went to Gangasnan, where the Muslim Subedar sent his soldiers to capture the queen. Seeing this, the queen shouted that if there is any Rajput here, then protect me. Coincidentally both Bais princes were present. They immediately killed the Muslim soldiers. After rescuing the queen, Nirbhaychand died from multiple wounds, but Abhaychand survived. Abhaychand married Gautam Raja's daughter. Raja gave her 1440 villages in the dowry north of the Ganges, where Abhaychand laid the foundation of Bais state. This Bais state came to be called Baiswada.

In 1856 when the British annexed Oudh State, then Maharaj Rao Ram Baksh Singh fought them and captured Oudh and merged it in Baiswada. Due to his bravery, Begum Hazrat Mahal gave him the title of "Raja-e-Awadh ". After capturing Oudh, Baiswada became the fourth biggest state of India covering 30,905 sq miles.

In 1858, the British attacked on Daundiya Kheda Fort and with the help of Chandi Kewat, a treacherous accomplice of the King, captured and destroyed the fort.They arrested the King and hanged him on 28 December 1858. Army General of Baiswada Rana Beni Madho fought 20 battles in 22 months against the British and secured his victory in every battle. When Britishers captured Baiswada in 1858, the state got under the Court of Words and later in 1949 was merged in republic of India.
