= Las Bayas =

Coordinates: 41°28′S 70°40′W

- Municipality and village
- Interactive map of Las Bayas
- Country: Argentina
- Province: Río Negro Province
- Time zone: UTC−3 (ART)

Las Bayas is a village and municipality in Río Negro Province in Argentina.
