= Baksar =

- Village
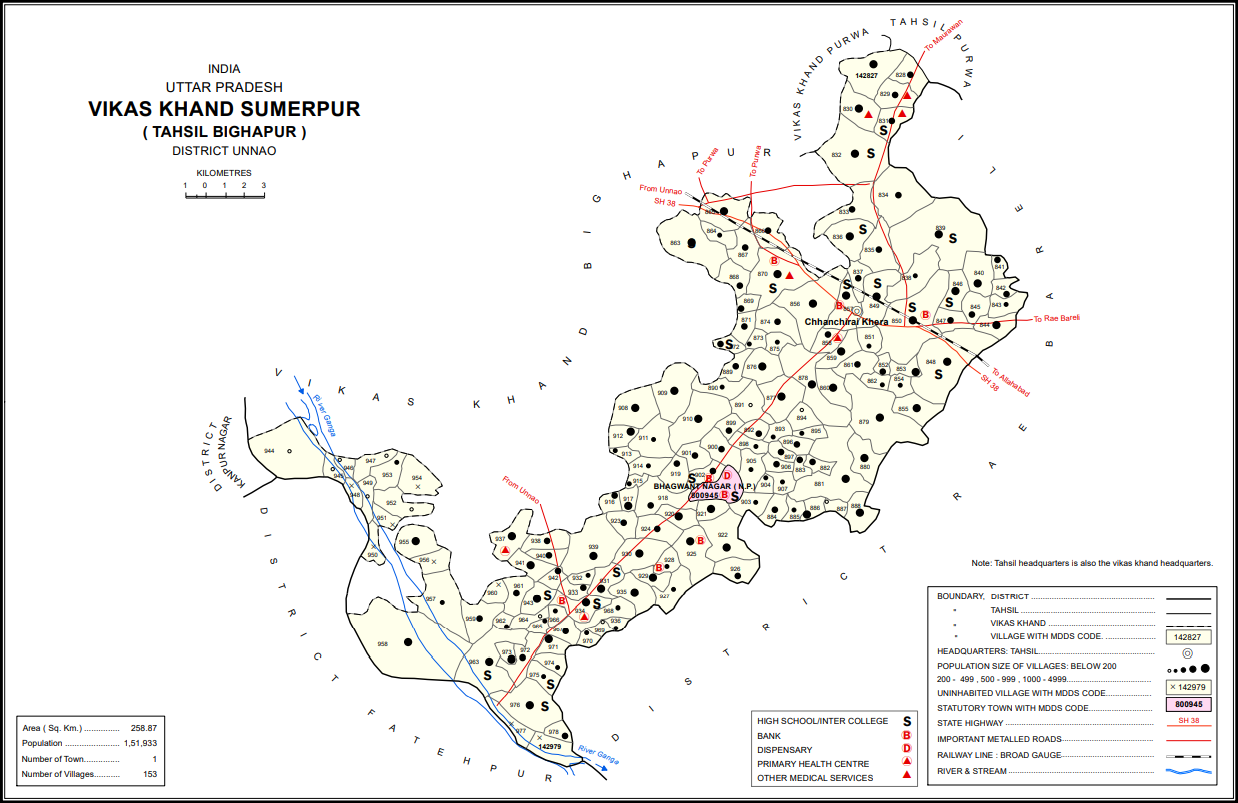
- Map showing Baksar (#976) in Sumerpur block

- Location in Uttar Pradesh, India Baksar (India)
- Coordinates: 26.145°N 80.675°E
- Country: India
- State: Uttar Pradesh
- District: Unnao

Government
  - Body: Gram panchayat

Area
  - Total: 3.655 km^{2} (1.411 sq mi)

Population (2011)
  - Total: 2,413
  - Density: 660.2/km^{2} (1,710/sq mi)

Languages
  - Official: Hindi English
- Time zone: UTC+5:30 (IST)
- PIN: 209863
- Telephone code: 05142
- Vehicle registration: UP 35
- Website: up.gov.in

Baksar is a village in Sumerpur block of Unnao district, Uttar Pradesh, India. The southernmost village in the district, Baksar is located on the bank of the Ganges at a spot where it flows slightly northward. Because of this, the river is considered especially sacred here, and enormous crowds gather here to bathe in its waters at a mela during the month of Kartik. The spot has a temple dedicated to Sri Chandrika Devi on the riverbank. As of 2011, the population of Baksar is 2,413 people, in 466 households.

The 1961 census recorded Baksar (here spelled "Baxar") as comprising 6 hamlets, with a total population of 1,033 (498 male and 535 female), in 201 households and 178 physical houses. The area of the village was given as 906 acres. It had 7 small miscellaneous food processing establishments and 4 makers of sundry hardwares at the time.

== Geography ==
Baksar is located at 26°21′N 80°41′E / 26.35°N 80.68°E. It has an average elevation of 120 meters (399 feet).
