= Baiswara =

Indian subregion

Baiswara is a subregion of Awadh in Uttar Pradesh, India, which includes parts of Unnao and Raebareli districts. Unnao and Raebareli districts were parts of Baiswada State.

It is associated with the Bais Rajput community.
