= Bais (clan) =

Rajput clan of India

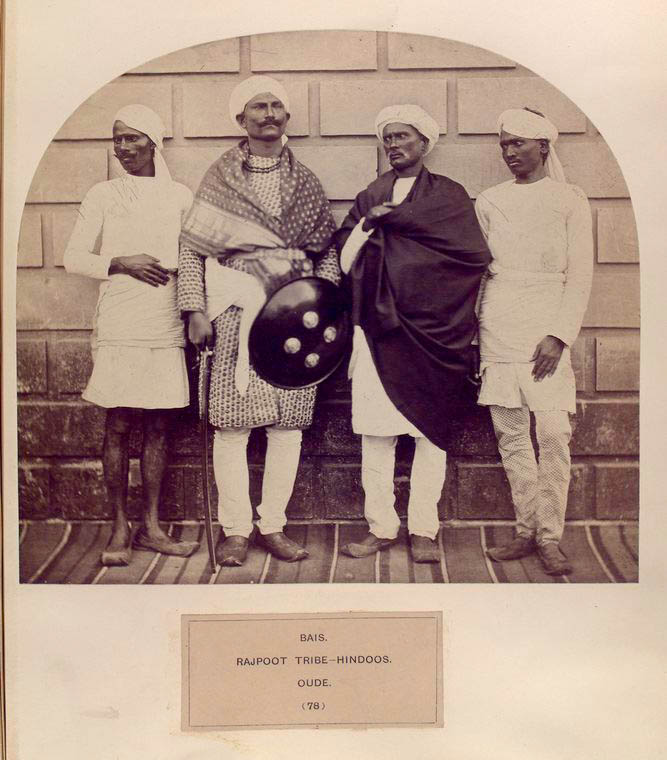
Bais Rajput in the 19th century, from The People of India

The Bais (pronounced [ˈbɛ̃ːs ˈraːdʒpuːt̪]) is a Rajput clan from India.

== History ==
Their wealth caused Donald Butter, a visiting doctor who wrote Outlines of the Topography and Statistics of the Southern Districts of Oudh, and of the Cantonment of Sultanpur-Oudh, to describe the Bais Rajput in the 1830s as the "best dressed and housed people of the southern Oudh".

The Bais Rajputs were known for well-fighting spirit.

== See also ==
- Baiswara
- Rajput clans
