= Korihar =

- Village
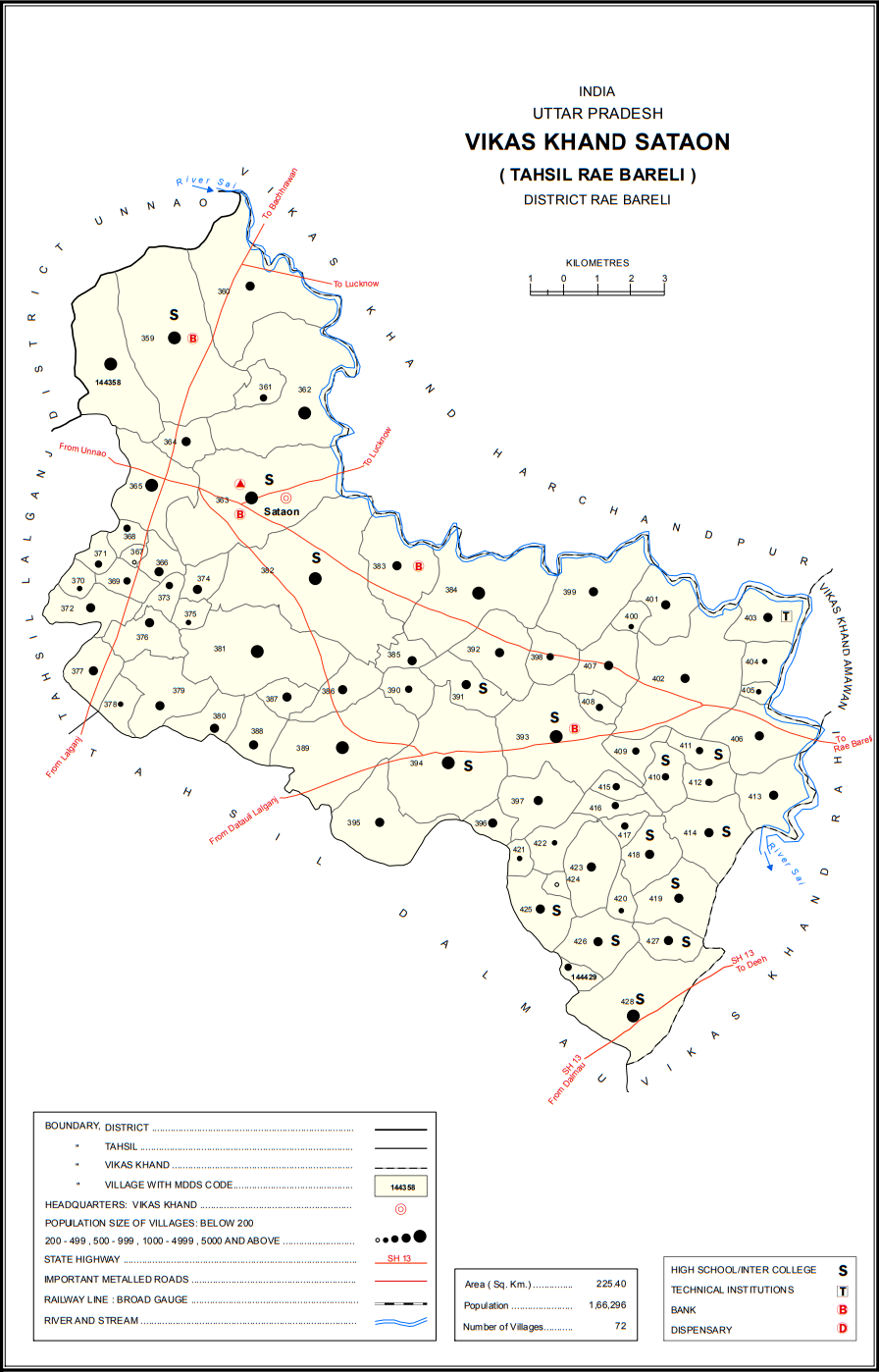
- Map showing Korihar (#382) in Sataon CD block

- Location in Uttar Pradesh, India
- Coordinates: 26.272438°N 81.061586°E
- Country India: India
- State: Uttar Pradesh
- District: Raebareli

Area
  - Total: 1.51 km^{2} (0.58 sq mi)

Population (2011)
  - Total: 12,351
  - Density: 8,180/km^{2} (21,200/sq mi)

Languages
  - Official: Hindi
- Time zone: UTC+5:30 (IST)
- Vehicle registration: UP-35

Korihar is a village located in Sataon block of Rae Bareli district, Uttar Pradesh, India. Located 20 km from Raebareli, the district headquarters, Korihar was historically the seat of a taluqdari estate held by a branch of the Bais Rajputs. On the northwest is Sataon, and to the south is the village of Hajipur, which has the ruins of an old Bais fort. As of 2011, the population of Korihar is 12,351, in 2,240 households. It has one primary school and no healthcare facilities. The village hosts markets twice per week, on Mondays and Fridays.

== History ==
Korihar was historically the seat of the taluqdari estate called Korihar Sataon, which was held by a branch of the Bais Rajputs. This branch was founded by Pahar Singh, one of the eight sons of Rana Doman Deo of Khajurgaon. Along with his brother Mitrajit Singh, ancestor of the taluqdars of Pahu, Pahar Singh accompanied Aurangzeb on his expedition to Kandahar, and both brothers died in an avalanche in 1647. Ten generations later, the taluqdar Gur Bakhsh Singh died childless, and his territories were seized by Rana Raghunath Singh of Khajurgaon until 1832. At that point, Gur Bakhsh Singh's adopted son Fateh Bahadur was able to recover the taluqa with the aid of Beni Madho Bakhsh of Shankarpur. Beni Madho Bakhsh himself then attempted to take over the taluqa via security interest, but the British agent William Henry Sleeman interfered and Fateh Bahadur ended up again recovering the taluqa by paying off a debt of Rs. 40,000. His descendants maintained possession of the estate into the 20th century.

At the turn of the 20th century, Korihar was described as a very large market village, with a population of 3,501 as of 1901. There was a large proportion of Lodh farmers in the village. There was a dispensary supported by the taluqdar of Korihar Sataon, as well as a primary school. There had also been a women's dispensary, but it had been unsuccessful and it was closed in 1904.

The 1961 census recorded Korihar as comprising 17 hamlets, with a total population of 4,794 people (2,525 male and 2,269 female), in 1,179 households and 864 physical houses. The area of the village was given as 3,958 acres and it had a post office at that point. It had 3 grain mills, 1 small manufacturer of clothing, and 1 small manufacturer of ammunition, fireworks, and/or other explosives.

The 1981 census recorded Korihar as having a population of 7,231 people and an area of 1,537.86 hectares. The main staple foods were given as wheat and rice.
