= Sataon =

- Village
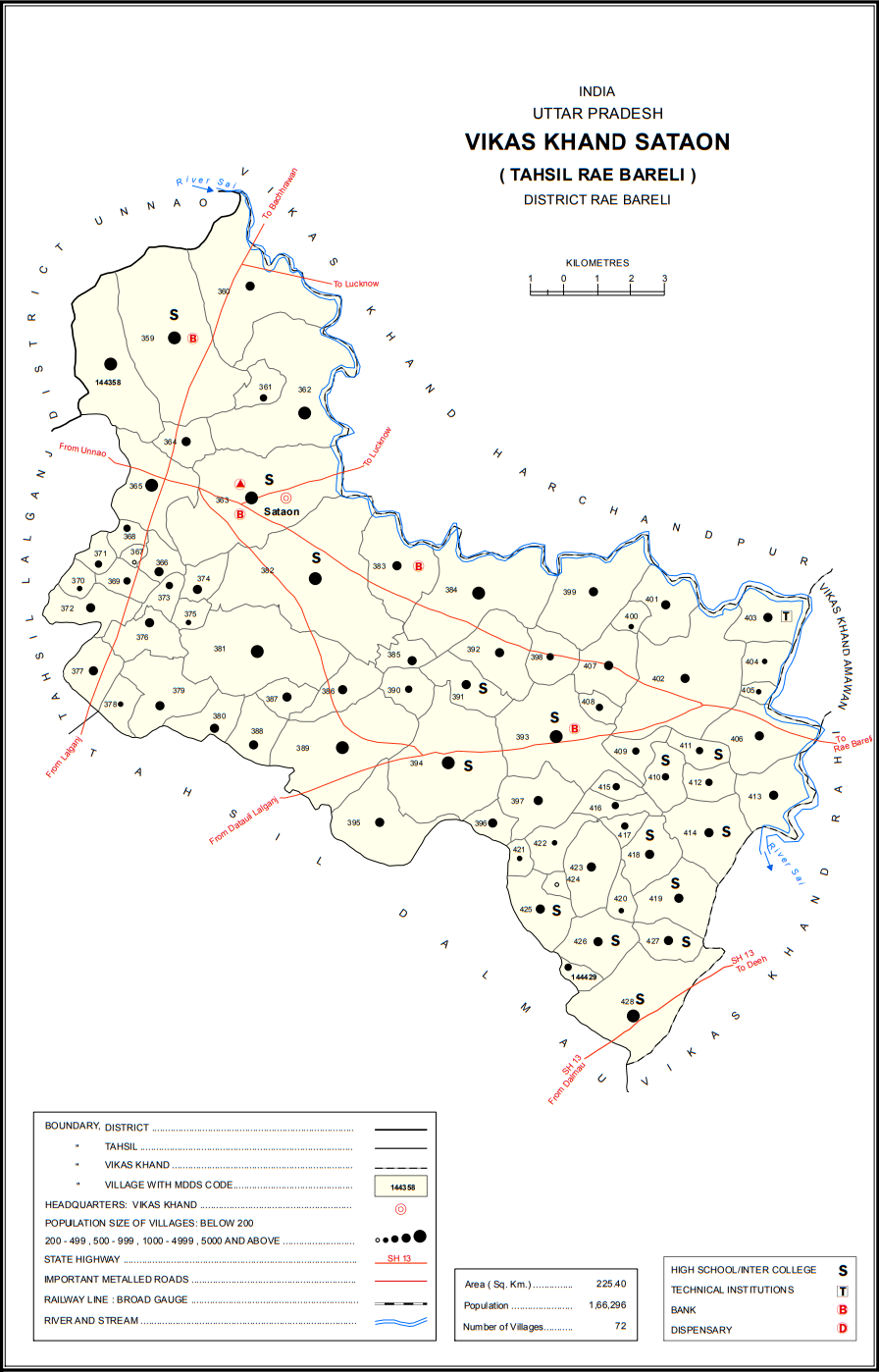
- Map of Sataon CD block

- Location in Uttar Pradesh, India
- Coordinates: 26.296698°N 81.046047°E
- Country India: India
- State: Uttar Pradesh
- District: Raebareli

Area
  - Total: 11.793 km^{2} (4.553 sq mi)

Population (2011)
  - Total: 9,151
  - Density: 776.0/km^{2} (2,010/sq mi)

Languages
  - Official: Hindi
- Time zone: UTC+5:30 (IST)
- Vehicle registration: UP-35

Sataon is a village and corresponding community development block in Rae Bareli district, Uttar Pradesh, India. It is located a bit to the west of the river Sai on the main Raebareli-Unnao road. It is 22 km from Raebareli, the district headquarters. As of 2011, its population is 9,151, in 1,756 households. It has 4 primary schools and 1 medical clinic.

Sataon hosts two annual festivals dedicated to the worship of Parvati Devi. The larger one is on Vaisakha Badi 3. Vendors bring metal utensils, earthenware pottery, bangles, and toys to sell at the festival. The other festival is held on Asvina Sudi 10 and is much smaller; vendors bring earthenware pottery, bangles, and various everyday items to sell.

== History ==
Along with Korihar, Sataon historically gave its name to a large taluqdari estate called Korihar Sataon, which was held by a branch of the Bais Rajputs. This branch was founded by Pahar Singh, one of the eight sons of Rana Doman Deo of Khajurgaon. Along with his brother Mitrajit Singh, ancestor of the taluqdars of Pahu, Pahar Singh accompanied Aurangzeb on his expedition to Kandahar, and both brothers died in an avalanche in 1647. Ten generations later, the taluqdar Gur Bakhsh Singh died childless, and his territories were seized by Rana Raghunath Singh of Khajurgaon until 1832. At that point, Gur Bakhsh Singh's adopted son Fateh Bahadur was able to recover the taluqa with the aid of Beni Madho Bakhsh of Shankarpur. Beni Madho Bakhsh himself then attempted to take over the taluqa via security interest, but the British agent William Henry Sleeman interfered and Fateh Bahadur ended up again recovering the taluqa by paying off a debt of Rs. 40,000. His descendants maintained possession of the estate into the 20th century.

At the turn of the 20th century, Sataon was described as a very large village with extensive orchards; it had a primary school and a ruined fort built by Fateh Bahadur Singh. The two fairs to Parvati were noted, with attendance listed as about 3,000 people, and with plenty of commerce in various local products, especially carts and metal vessels, taking place at the events. The population of Sataon in 1901 was 2,964 people, and a large proportion of residents belonged to the Lodh community.

The 1961 census recorded Sataon as comprising 9 hamlets, with a total population of 3,872 people (1,975 male and 1,897 female), in 777 households and 697 physical houses. The area of the village was given as 2,809 acres and it had a medical practitioner and post office at that point. Average attendance of the Parvati Devi festival in Vaisakha was then about 15,000 people. Attendance to the Asvina one was 500. It had 5 grain mills, 5 bicycle repair shops, and 1 small manufacturer/repairer not assignable to any group.

The 1981 census recorded Sataon as having a population of 5,690 people, in 100 households, and having an area of 1,136.80 hectares. The main staple foods were given as wheat and rice.

== Archaeology ==
In the late 1990s, archaeologists D. P. Tewari and Anoop Kumar Singh discovered several stone sculptures of Parvati, Ganesha, and Vishnu at Sataon, which they dated stylistically to approximately the 9th or 10th century.

== Villages ==
Sataon CD block has the following 72 villages:

Village name	Total land area (hectares)	Population (in 2011)
Gojhari	1,014.9	6,145
Konsa	1,032.2	6,797
Krishapur Tala	799.8	3,835
Bankat	113.7	606
Bardar	1,020.6	6,557
Sataon (block headquarters)	1,197.3	9,151
Garhi Dularai	204.1	1,300
Onai Paharpur	385.2	5,054
Khusroopur	106.1	1,108
Chak Nasirpur	16	20
Gambhipur	81.4	867
Huseni	131.9	722
Hoonsepur	65.3	223
Gauri Sataon	76.1	868
Dumapur	199.9	1,404
Sekhapur	124.6	612
Manpur	118.4	1,027
Hardhaurpur	71.7	407
Raulla	204.3	1,229
Shahjaura	182.2	2,929
Jaitpur	110.1	340
Lohara	361.1	3,091
Govindpur Kothaiya	179.7	1,424
Hajipur	784.8	7,514
Korihar	151	12,351
Malikmau Chaubara	398.7	3,432
Porae	800.5	5,652
Chandwal	222	1,112
Jaitipur	116.8	1,584
Shahjadpur	119.7	1,070
Bans	209	1,341
Sultanpur Khera	804.3	7,619
Paharpur Khera	126.9	632
Ataura Khurd	238.7	2,118
Chandai Raghunathpur	322.1	2,077
Kailauli	819.1	5,188
Ataura Buzurg	1,217.6	8,466
Jariya	243.6	1,080
Sarai Dugosha	102	1,473
Barauwa	311.3	2,048
Jetuwa Tappe Bhaon	209.9	946
Bathuwa Khas	684.5	4,118
Surpur Bathuwa	74.5	365
Sonika Mau	266.7	1,452
Dedaur	983	4,781
Salarpur	271.3	1,462
Lohara Mau	83.4	473
Sakha Naubati	115.1	409
Dariwa	443	2,537
Sarai Mubarak	237.1	1,151
Asha Nandpur	83.8	719
Soitha	137.8	831
Nakdilpur	188.6	786
Rasoolpur Gunda	119.6	615
Chandauli	140.7	743
Reti Khurd Buzurg	363.9	1,847
Nak Phulha	378.7	2,517
Alipur Aaima	103.3	567
Balla Baraula	158.4	898
Jagjiwanpur Amariya	15.6	834
Tikra	229	1,538
Padri Ganeshpur	288.9	1,780
Chak Majhauna	97.7	220
Chak Singaria	60.7	422
Shahpur	149.3	410
Kalyanpur Raili	339.6	1,852
Chak Godwa	42.8	162
Chilaula Bhagariya	266.4	1,934
Purwa Pindor	265.9	1,740
Dedani	180	1,480
Manehroo	706	5,334
Narauka	87.5	900
