= Salarpur =

Salarpur may refer to:

- Salarpur, Varanasi, a village in Varanasi district, India
- Salarpur, Budaun, a Block & village panchayat in Budaun district
- Salarpur Khadar, a town in Gautam Buddha Nagar district, Uttar Pradesh, India
- Salarpur, Sataon, a village in Raebareli district, Uttar Pradesh, India

== Nearby ==
State Bank of India, DI Themes, ICICI Bank ATM
