= Bans, Raebareli =

Bans Bāns
- Village
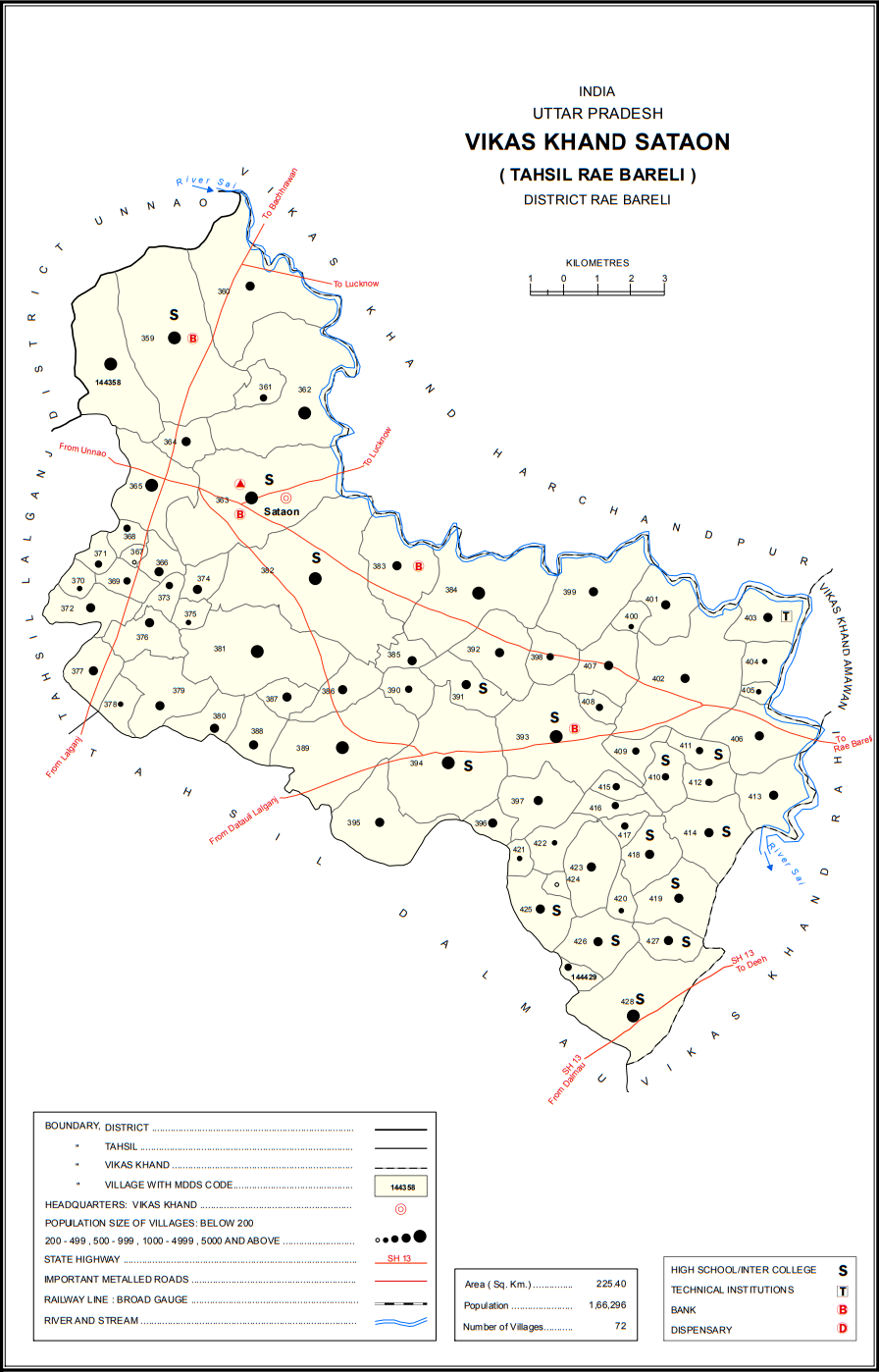
- Map showing Bans (#388) in Sataon CD block

- Location in Uttar Pradesh, India
- Coordinates: 26.238591°N 81.054587°E
- Country India: India
- State: Uttar Pradesh
- District: Raebareli

Area
  - Total: 2.09 km^{2} (0.81 sq mi)

Population (2011)
  - Total: 1,341
  - Density: 642/km^{2} (1,660/sq mi)

Languages
  - Official: Hindi
- Time zone: UTC+5:30 (IST)
- Vehicle registration: UP-35

Bans is a village located in Sataon block of Rae Bareli district, Uttar Pradesh, India. As of 2011, its population is 1,341, in 244 households. It has two primary schools and no healthcare facilities.

The 1961 census recorded Bans as comprising 3 hamlets, with a total population of 615 people (282 male and 333 female), in 113 households and 103 physical houses. The area of the village was given as 579 acres.

The 1981 census recorded Bans as having a population of 796 people, in 157 households, and having an area of 234.73 hectares. The main staple foods were given as wheat and rice.

== Archaeology ==
During an archaeological survey of Raebareli district in the late 1990s, archaeologists D. P. Tewari and Anoop Kumar Singh encountered various redware and brick samples at Bans, which they dated tentatively to the Kushan and medieval periods.
