= Chandauli, Sataon =

Chandauli
- Village
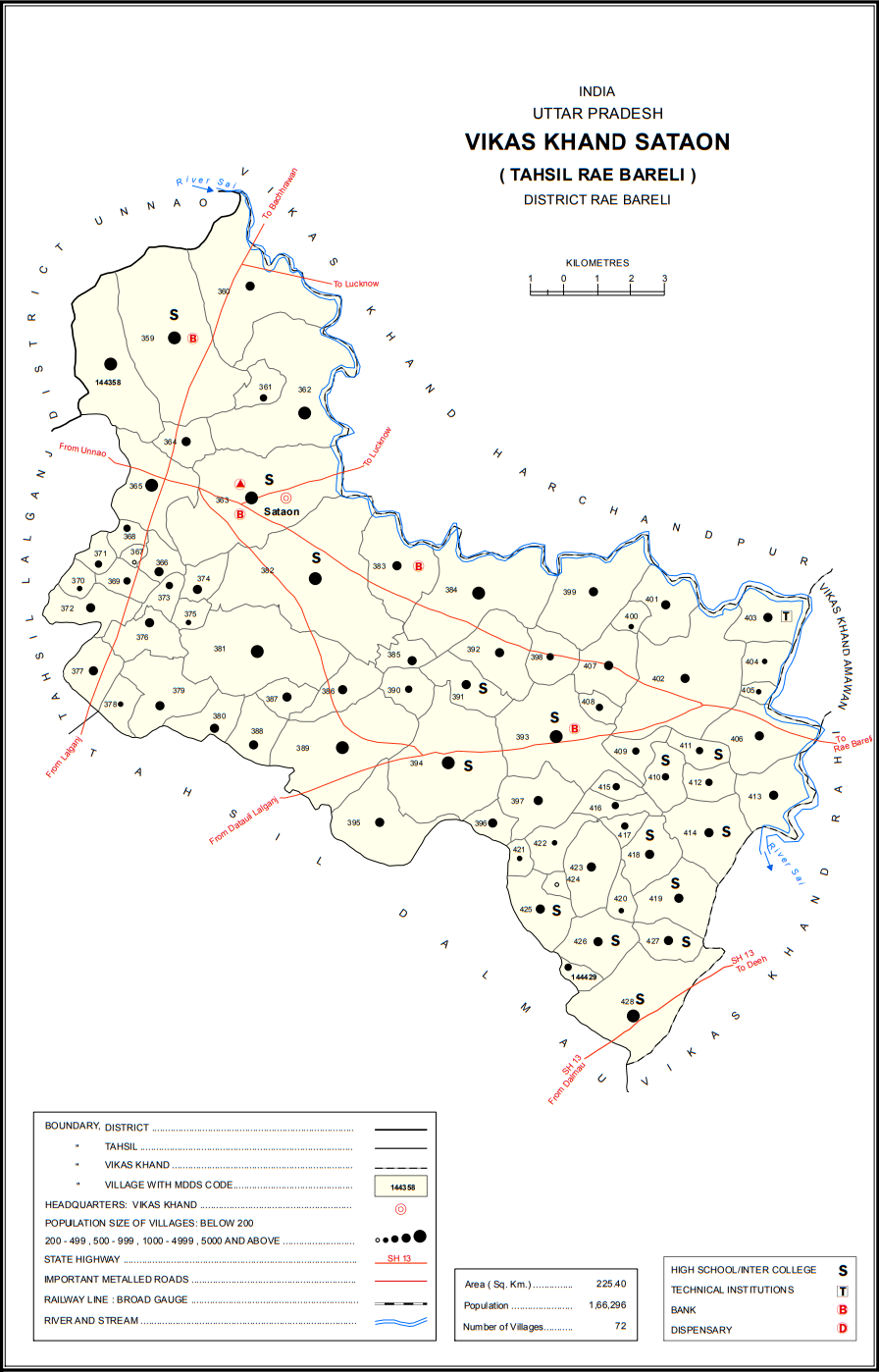
- Map showing Chandauli (#412) in Sataon CD block

- Location in Uttar Pradesh, India
- Coordinates: 26.220638°N 81.187922°E
- Country India: India
- State: Uttar Pradesh
- District: Raebareli

Area
  - Total: 1.407 km^{2} (0.543 sq mi)

Population (2011)
  - Total: 743
  - Density: 528/km^{2} (1,370/sq mi)

Languages
  - Official: Hindi
- Time zone: UTC+5:30 (IST)
- Vehicle registration: UP-35

Chandauli is a village in Sataon block of Rae Bareli district, Uttar Pradesh, India. It is located 5 km from Raebareli, the district headquarters. As of 2011, its population is 743, in 162 households. It has one primary school and no healthcare facilities.

The 1961 census recorded Chandauli as comprising 1 hamlet, with a total population of 328 people (172 male and 156 female), in 85 households and 77 physical houses. The area of the village was given as 345 acres.

The 1981 census recorded Chandauli as having a population of 543 people, in 95 households, and having an area of 139.62 hectares. The main staple foods were given as juwar and rice.
