= Paharpur Khera =

Paharpur Khera Pahārpur Khera
- Village
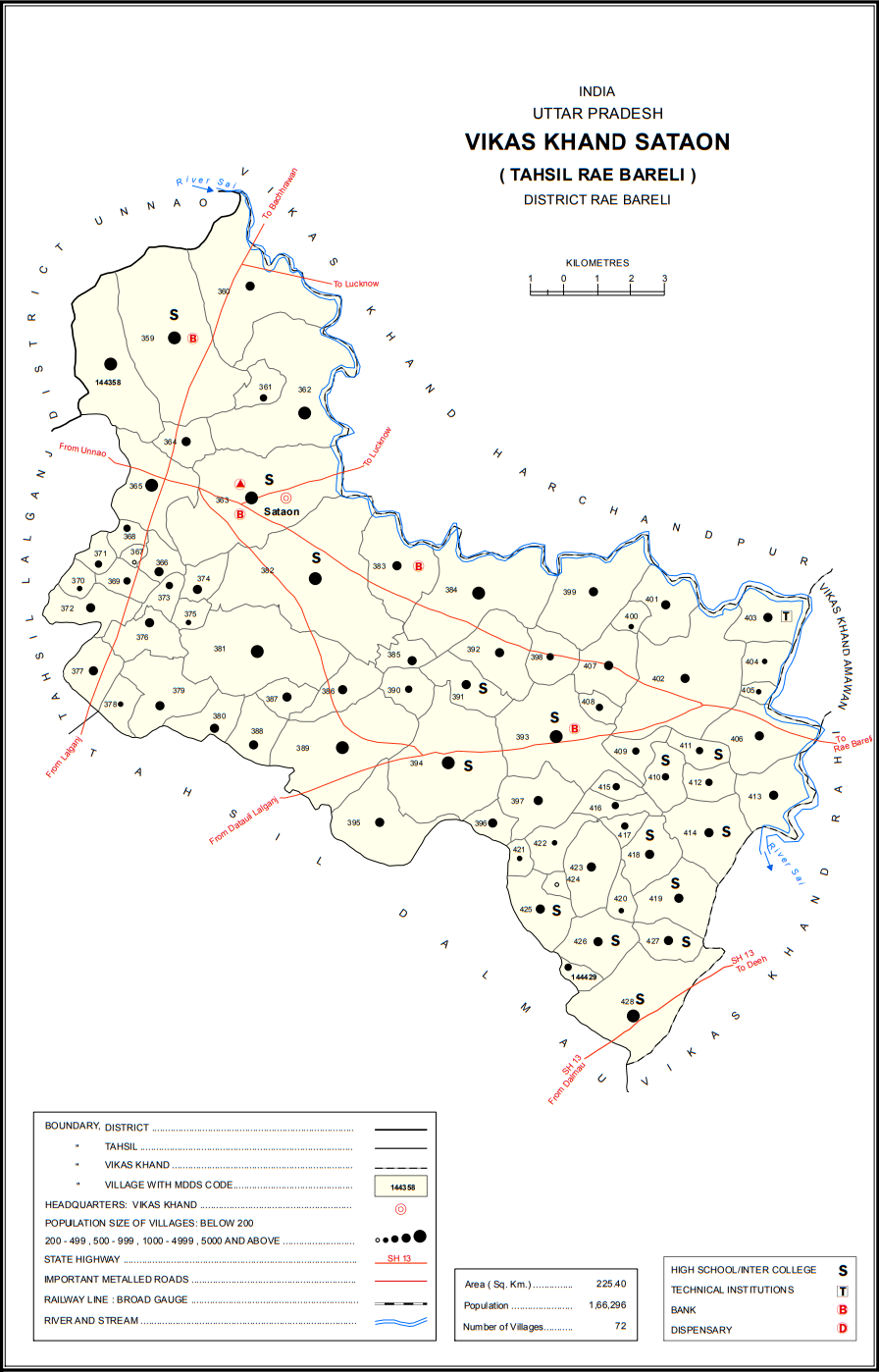
- Map showing Paharpur Khera (#390) in Sataon CD block

- Location in Uttar Pradesh, India
- Coordinates: 26.245693°N 81.09158°E
- Country India: India
- State: Uttar Pradesh
- District: Raebareli

Area
  - Total: 1.269 km^{2} (0.490 sq mi)

Population (2011)
  - Total: 632
  - Density: 498/km^{2} (1,290/sq mi)

Languages
  - Official: Hindi
- Time zone: UTC+5:30 (IST)
- Vehicle registration: UP-35

Paharpur Khera is a village located in Sataon block of Rae Bareli district, Uttar Pradesh, India. It is located 11 km from Raebareli, the district headquarters. As of 2011, its population is 632, in 112 households. It has one primary school and no healthcare facilities.

The 1961 census recorded Paharpur Khera as comprising 1 hamlet, with a total population of 285 people (158 male and 127 female), in 50 households and 50 physical houses. The area of the village was given as 363 acres.

The 1981 census recorded Paharpur Khera as having a population of 396 people, in 65 households, and having an area of 142.05 hectares. The main staple foods were given as wheat and rice.
