= Sarai Dugosha =

Sarai Dugosha Sarāi Dugosha
- Village
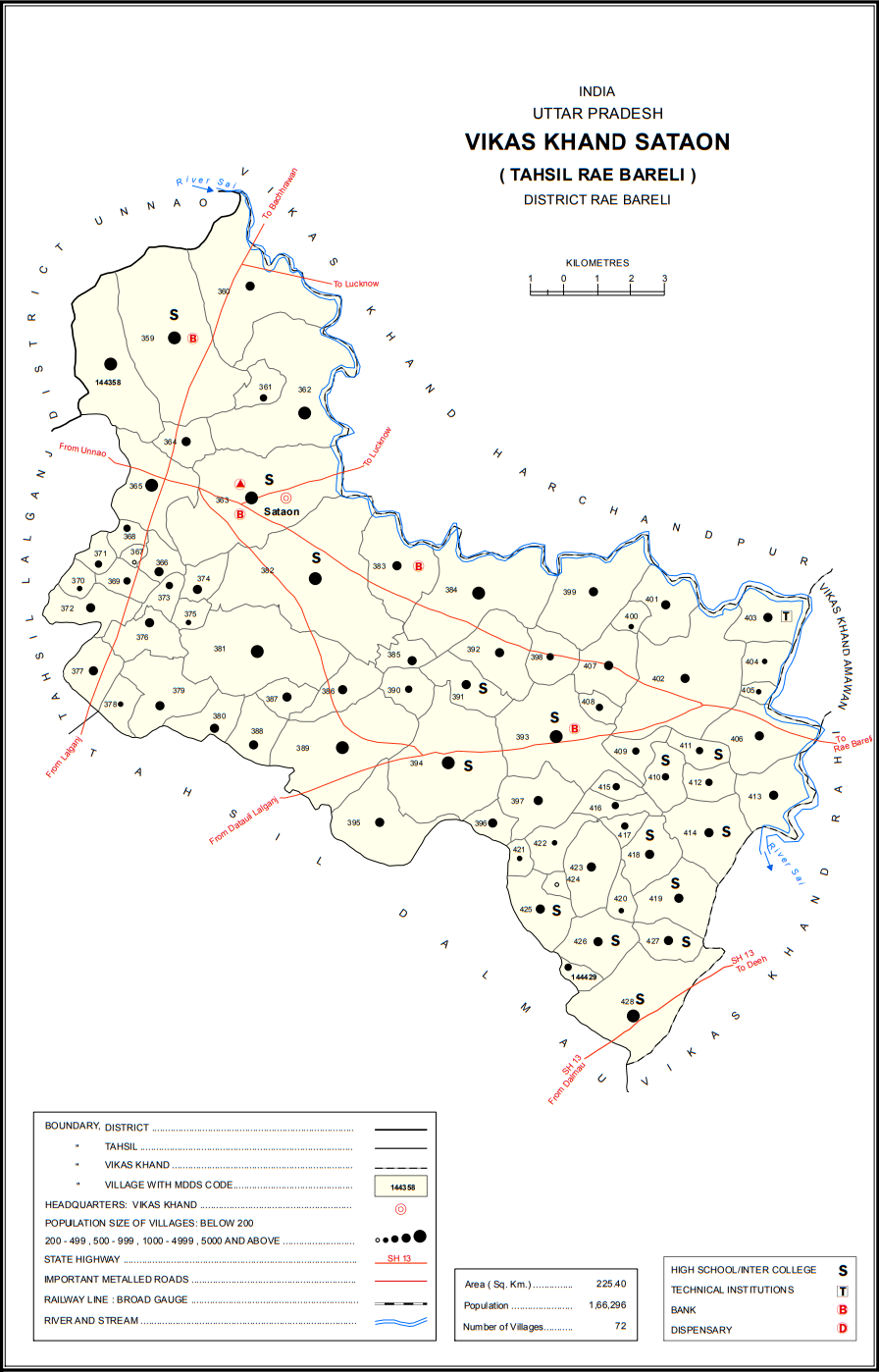
- Map showing Sarai Dugosha (#396) in Sataon CD block

- Location in Uttar Pradesh, India
- Coordinates: 26.207527°N 81.121816°E
- Country India: India
- State: Uttar Pradesh
- District: Raebareli

Area
  - Total: 1.02 km^{2} (0.39 sq mi)

Population (2011)
  - Total: 1,473
  - Density: 1,440/km^{2} (3,740/sq mi)

Languages
  - Official: Hindi
- Time zone: UTC+5:30 (IST)
- Vehicle registration: UP-35

Sarai Dugosha is a village in the Sataon block of the Rae Bareli district, Uttar Pradesh, India. It is located 14 km from Raebareli, the district headquarters. As of 2011, its population was 1,473, living in 251 households. It has one primary school and no healthcare facilities.

The 1961 census recorded Sarai Dugosha (as "Sarai Dogosha") as comprising 2 hamlets, with a total population of 571 people (296 male and 275 female), in 115 households and 106 physical houses. The area of the village was given as 264 acres.

The 1981 census recorded Sarai Dugosha (as "Sarai Dugosa") as having a population of 874 people, in 150 households, and having an area of 101.98 hectares. The main staple foods were given as wheat and rice.
