= Ataura Buzurg =

- Village
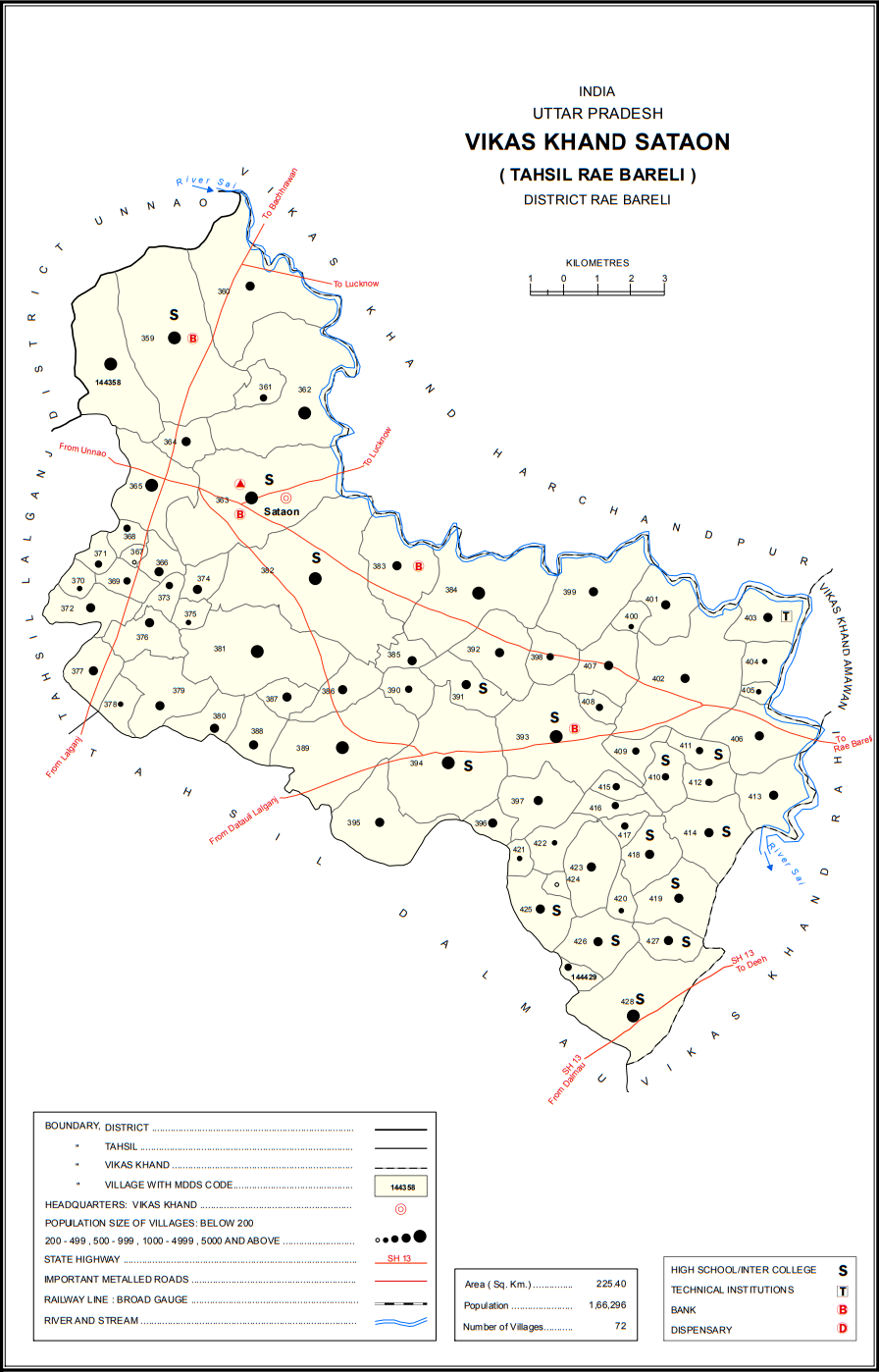
- Map showing Ataura Buzurg (#394) in Sataon CD block

- Location in Uttar Pradesh, India
- Coordinates: 26.230248°N 81.108106°E
- Country India: India
- State: Uttar Pradesh
- District: Raebareli

Area
  - Total: 12.176 km^{2} (4.701 sq mi)

Population (2011)
  - Total: 8,466
  - Density: 695.3/km^{2} (1,801/sq mi)

Languages
  - Official: Hindi
- Time zone: UTC+5:30 (IST)
- Vehicle registration: UP-35

Ataura Buzurg is a village in Sataon block of Rae Bareli district, Uttar Pradesh, India. It is located 14 km from Raebareli, the district headquarters. As of 2011, its population is 8,466, in 1,573 households. It has 4 primary schools and no healthcare facilities.

The 1961 census recorded Ataura Buzurg as comprising 20 hamlets, with a total population of 3,150 people (1,570 male and 1,580 female), in 654 households and 606 physical houses. The area of the village was given as 3,175 acres, and it had a post office at that point.

The 1981 census recorded Ataura Buzurg as having a population of 4,174 people, in 799 households, and having an area of 1,217.34 hectares. The main staple foods were given as wheat and rice.
