= Alipur Aima =

- Village
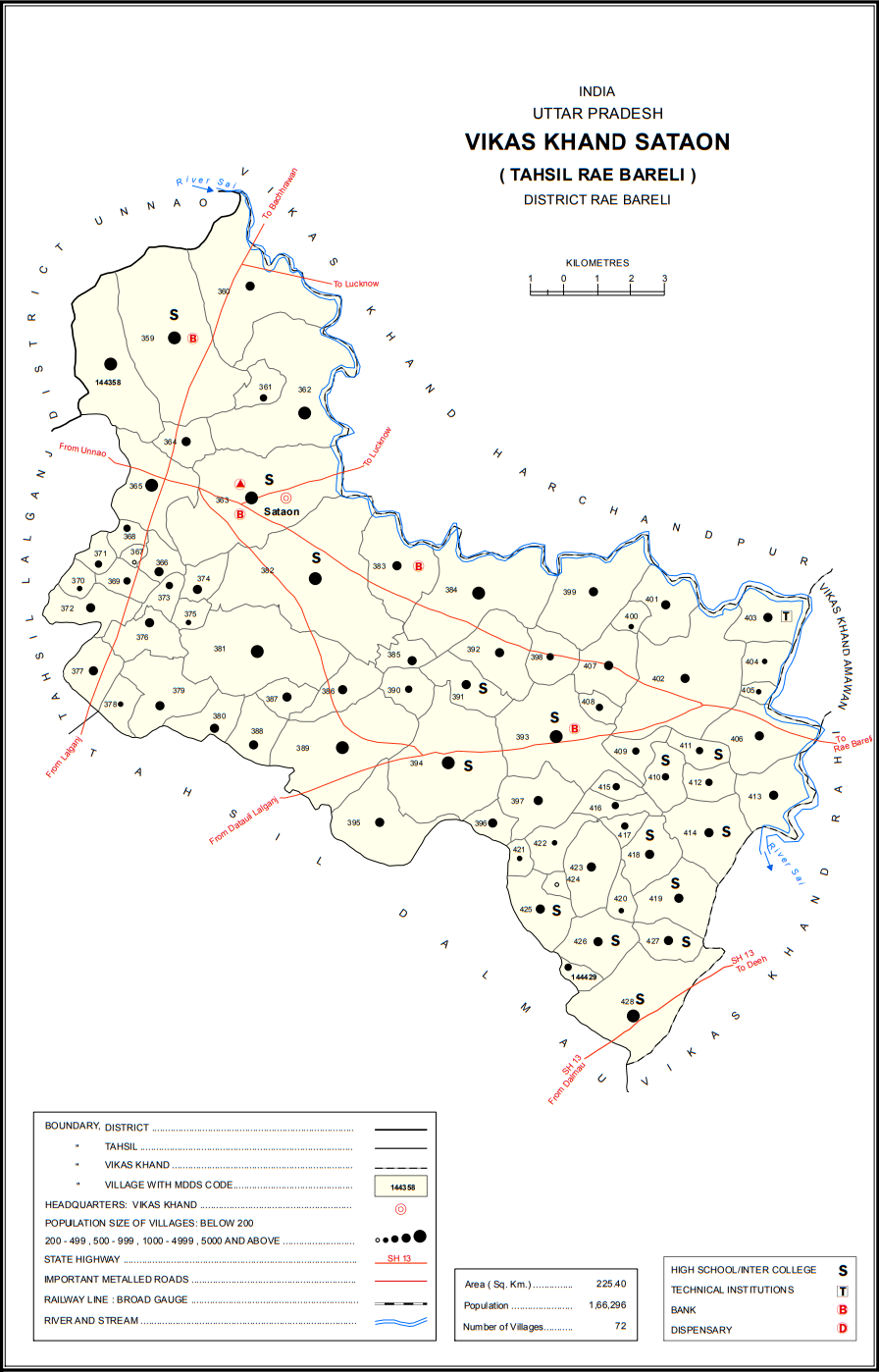
- Map showing Alipur Aima (#415) in Sataon CD block

- Location in Uttar Pradesh, India
- Coordinates: 26.218713°N 81.156315°E
- Country India: India
- State: Uttar Pradesh
- District: Raebareli

Area
  - Total: 1.033 km^{2} (0.399 sq mi)

Population (2011)
  - Total: 567
  - Density: 549/km^{2} (1,420/sq mi)

Languages
  - Official: Hindi
- Time zone: UTC+5:30 (IST)
- Vehicle registration: UP-35

Alipur Aima is a village in Sataon block of Rae Bareli district, Uttar Pradesh, India. It is located 12 km from Raebareli, the district headquarters. As of 2011, its population is 567, in 106 households. It has one primary school and no healthcare facilities.

The 1961 census recorded Alipur Aima as comprising 1 hamlet, with a total population of 274 people (143 male and 131 female), in 57 households and 48 physical houses. The area of the village was given as 270 acres.

The 1981 census recorded Alipur Aima (as "Alipur Aaina") as having a population of 327 people, in 63 households, and having an area of 103.20 hectares. The main staple foods were given as wheat and rice.
