= Garhi Dularai =

- Village
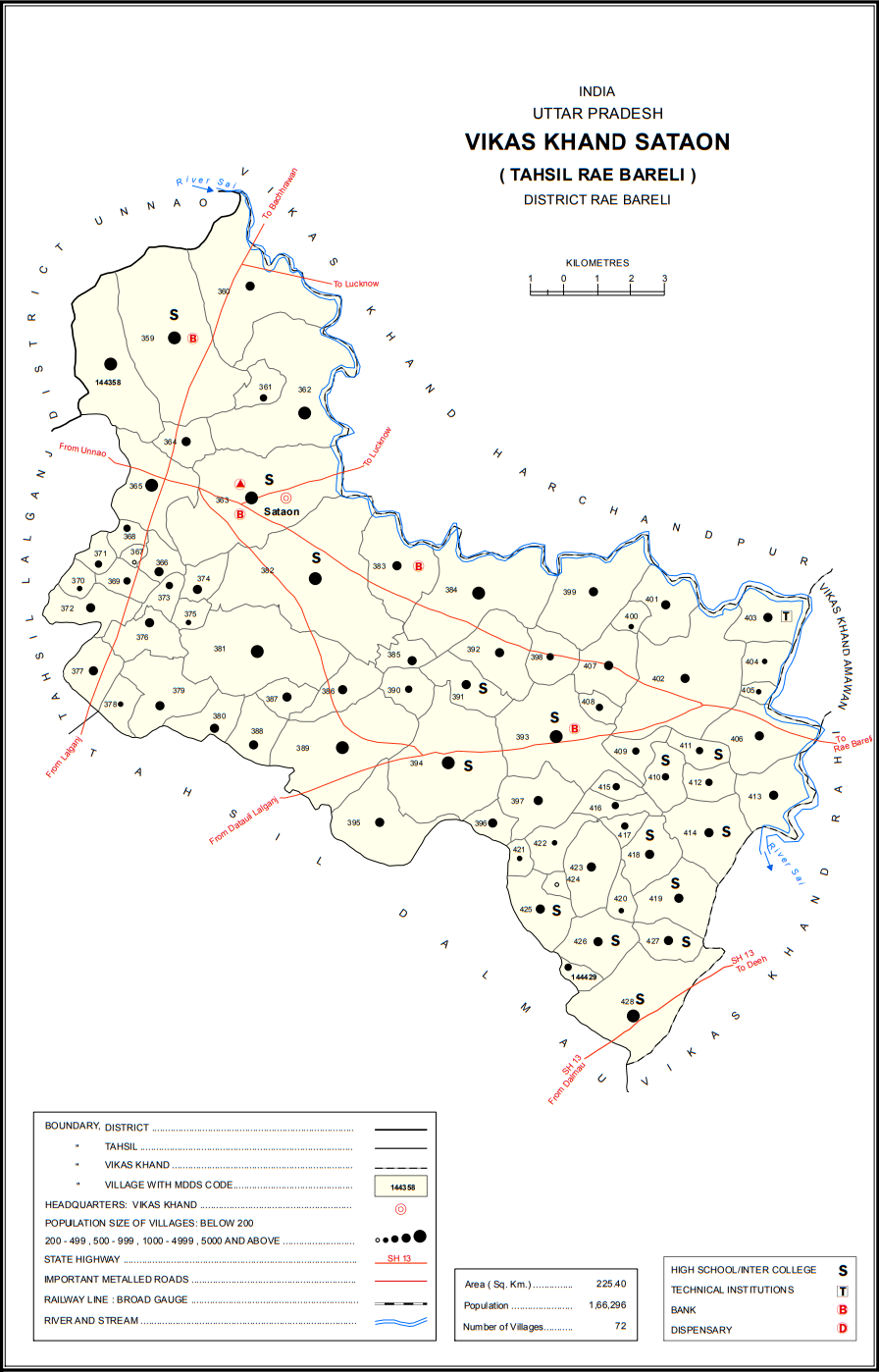
- Map showing Garhi Dularai (#364) in Sataon CD block

- Location in Uttar Pradesh, India
- Coordinates: 26.309992°N 81.029443°E
- Country India: India
- State: Uttar Pradesh
- District: Raebareli

Area
  - Total: 2.041 km^{2} (0.788 sq mi)

Population (2011)
  - Total: 1,300
  - Density: 640/km^{2} (1,600/sq mi)

Languages
  - Official: Hindi
- Time zone: UTC+5:30 (IST)
- Vehicle registration: UP-35

Garhi Dularai is a village located in Sataon block of Rae Bareli district, Uttar Pradesh, India. It is located 24 km from Raebareli, the district headquarters. As of 2011, its population is 1,300, in 232 households. It has one primary school and no healthcare facilities.

The 1961 census recorded Garhi Dularai as comprising 3 hamlets, with a total population of 736 people (395 male and 341 female), in 118 households and 116 physical houses. The area of the village was given as 521 acres.

The 1981 census recorded Garhi Dularai as having a population of 933 people, in 148 households, and having an area of 207.61 hectares. The main staple foods were given as wheat and rice.
