= Manehru =

- Village
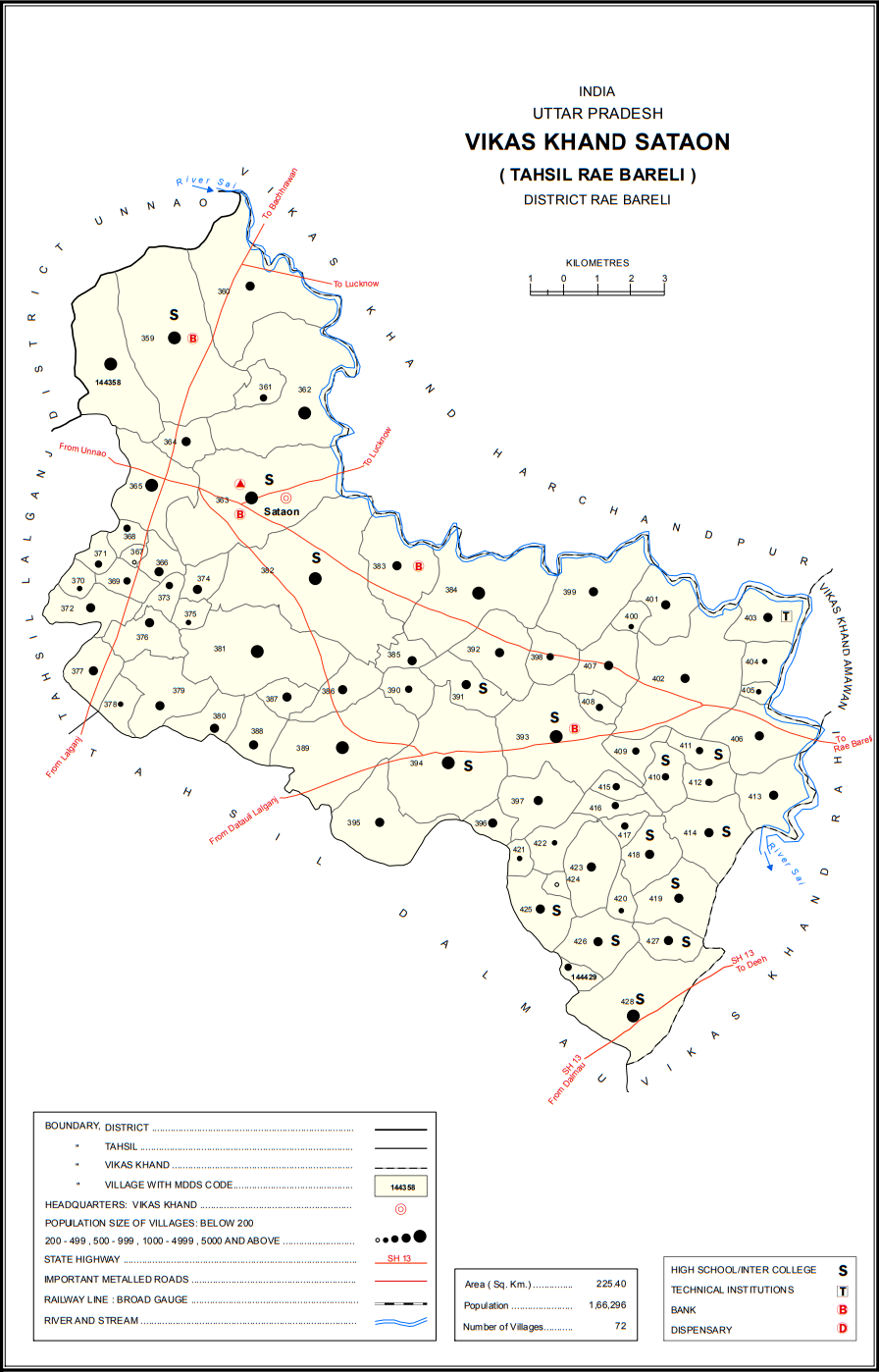
- Map showing Manehru (#428) in Sataon CD block

- Location in Uttar Pradesh, India
- Coordinates: 26.157334°N 81.159088°E
- Country India: India
- State: Uttar Pradesh
- District: Raebareli

Area
  - Total: 7.06 km^{2} (2.73 sq mi)

Population (2011)
  - Total: 5,334
  - Density: 756/km^{2} (1,960/sq mi)

Languages
  - Official: Hindi
- Time zone: UTC+5:30 (IST)
- Vehicle registration: UP-35

Manehru is a village in Sataon block of Rae Bareli district, Uttar Pradesh, India. It is located 10 km from Raebareli, the district headquarters. As of 2011, its population is 5,334, in 1,042 households. It has one primary school and no healthcare facilities, and it hosts both a permanent market and a weekly haat. The Manehru-Shankarganj market is held on Wednesdays and Sundays and is mostly focused on trade in grain and cloth. Manehru belongs to the nyaya panchayat of Kalyanpur Raili.

Around the turn of the 20th century, Manehru was held by Thakurain Sheonath Kunwar, aunt of Thakur Drigpal Singh of Paho, as guzaradar.

The 1951 census recorded Manehru (as "Manheru") as comprising 13 hamlets, with a total population of 1,722 people (905 male and 817 female), in 46 households and 43 physical houses. The area of the village was given as 1,825 acres. 120 residents were literate, 118 male and 2 female. The village was listed as belonging to the pargana of Rae Bareli South and the thana of Kotwali.

The 1961 census recorded Manehru (as "Manheru") as comprising 12 hamlets, with a total population of 2,036 people (1,019 male and 1,017 female), in 371 households and 356 physical houses. The area of the village was given as 1,825 acres. Average attendance of the twice-weekly market was about 600 people then.

The 1981 census recorded Manehru (also spelled "Manehar" in this case) as having a population of 2,750 people, in 555 households, and having an area of 695.27 hectares. The main staple foods were given as wheat and rice.

The 1991 census recorded Manehru (as "Manehroo") as having a total population of 3,737 people (1,989 male and 1,748 female), in 646 households and 601 physical houses. The area of the village was listed as 725 hectares. Members of the 0-6 age group numbered 773, or 21% of the total; this group was 52% male (403) and 48% female (370). Members of scheduled castes made up 39% of the village's population (1,339 in total), while members of scheduled tribes made up less than 1% (14 in total). The literacy rate of the village was 25.5% (763 men and 193 women). 1,266 people were classified as main workers (1,028 men and 238 women), while 209 people were classified as marginal workers (8 male and 201 female); the remaining 2,262 residents were non-workers. The breakdown of main workers by employment category was as follows: 885 cultivators (i.e. people who owned or leased their own land); 223 agricultural labourers (i.e. people who worked someone else's land in return for payment); 4 workers in livestock, forestry, fishing, hunting, plantations, orchards, etc.; 0 in mining and quarrying; 3 household industry workers; 28 workers employed in other manufacturing, processing, service, and repair roles; 10 construction workers; 35 employed in trade and commerce; 12 employed in transport, storage, and communications; and 66 in other services.
