= Kilauli =

- Village
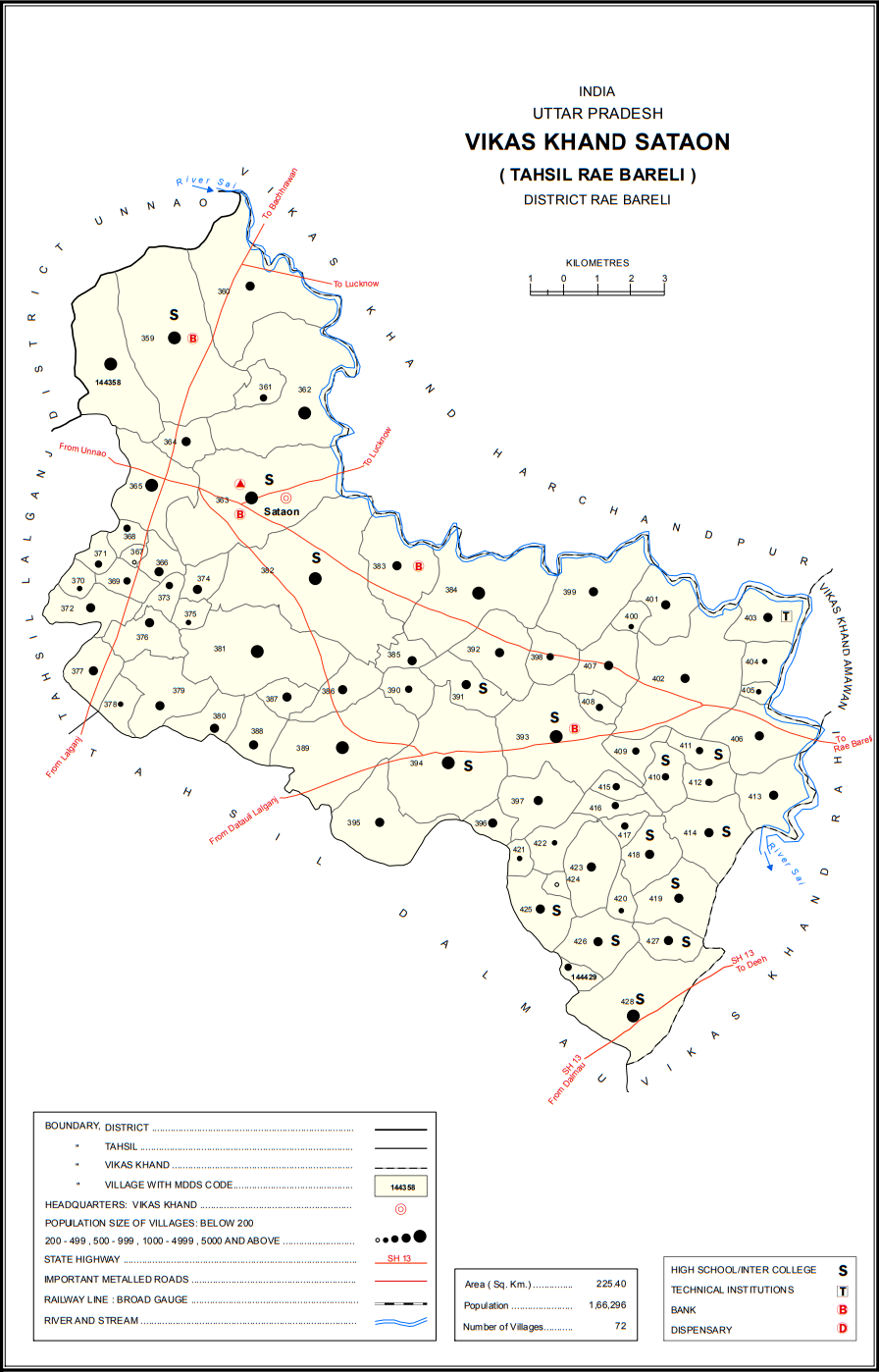
- Map showing Kilauli (#393) in Sataon CD block

- Location in Uttar Pradesh, India
- Coordinates: 26.233597°N 81.140678°E
- Country India: India
- State: Uttar Pradesh
- District: Raebareli

Area
  - Total: 8.191 km^{2} (3.163 sq mi)

Population (2011)
  - Total: 5,188
  - Density: 633.4/km^{2} (1,640/sq mi)

Languages
  - Official: Hindi
- Time zone: UTC+5:30 (IST)
- Vehicle registration: UP-35

Kilauli is a village in Sataon block of Rae Bareli district, Uttar Pradesh, India. It is located 8 km from Raebareli, the district headquarters. As of 2011, its population is 5,188, in 1,045 households. It has 6 primary schools and no healthcare facilities.

== History ==
Kilauli had formed part of the Shankarpur estate of Rana Beni Madho Baksh before being confiscated by the British. It was then exchanged for the village of Ahmadpur (now within the Raebareli city limits) along with part of Garwa Gadiana to provide land for the city's cantonments.

The 1961 census recorded Kilauli as comprising 10 hamlets, with a total population of 2,157 people (1,087 male and 1,070 female), in 452 households and 410 physical houses. The area of the village was given as 2,097 acres.

The 1981 census recorded Kilauli (as "Kelauli") as having a population of 3,153 people, in 755 households, and having an area of 813.85 hectares. The main staple foods were given as wheat and rice.
