= Ataura Khurd =

- Village
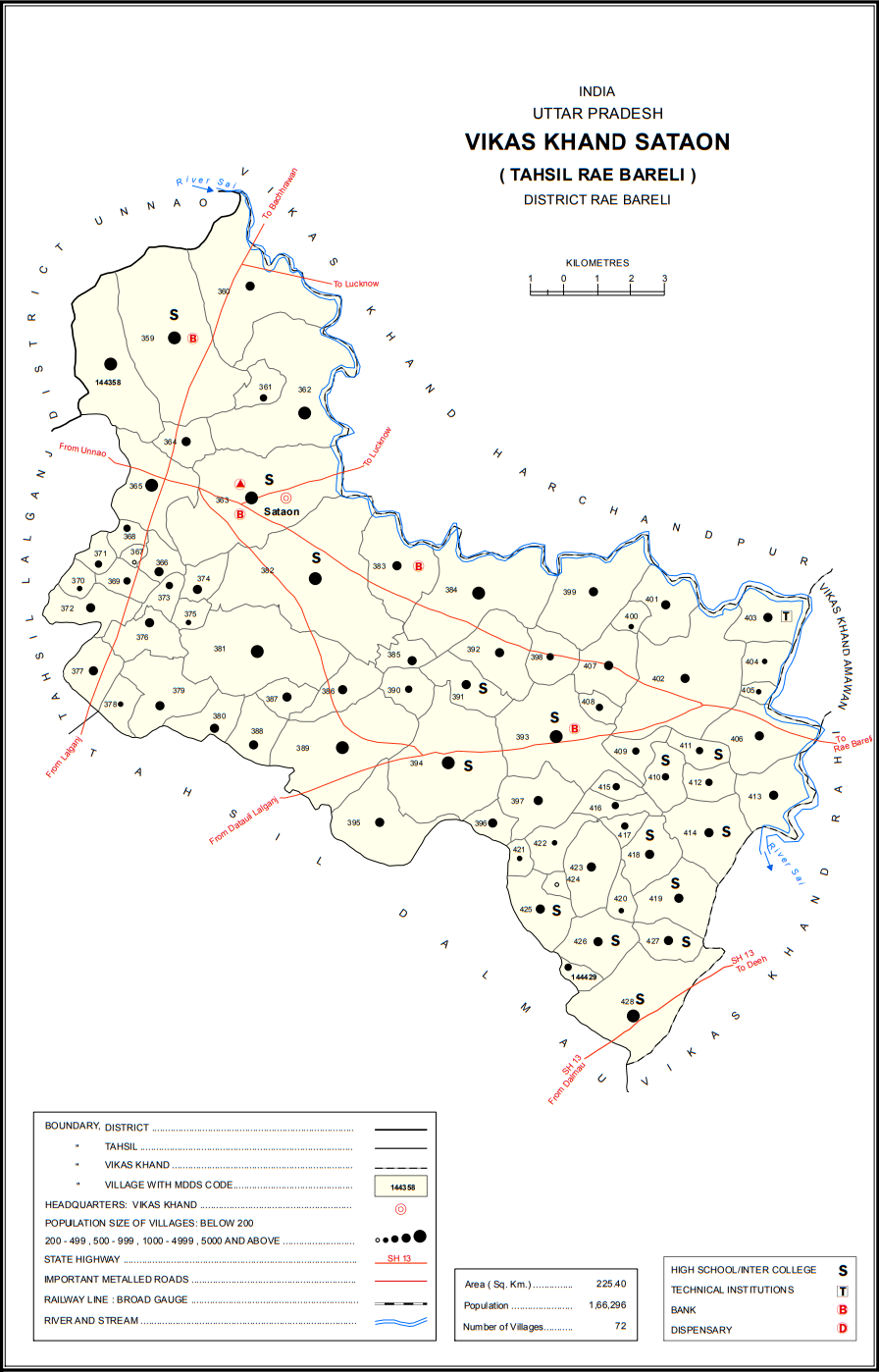
- Map showing Ataura Khurd (#391) in Sataon CD block

- Location in Uttar Pradesh, India
- Coordinates: 26.24299°N 81.117204°E
- Country India: India
- State: Uttar Pradesh
- District: Raebareli

Area
  - Total: 2.387 km^{2} (0.922 sq mi)

Population (2011)
  - Total: 2,118
  - Density: 887.3/km^{2} (2,298/sq mi)

Languages
  - Official: Hindi
- Time zone: UTC+5:30 (IST)
- Vehicle registration: UP-35

Ataura Khurd is a village in Sataon block of Rae Bareli district, Uttar Pradesh, India. It is located 15 km from Raebareli, the district headquarters. As of 2011, its population is 2,118, in 390 households. It has one primary school and no healthcare facilities. Ataura Khurd hosts a festival to Durga Devi on Vaisakha Badi 4-11 and Kartika Badi 4-11 dedicated to the worship of the goddess. Vendors bring sweets, toys, and various everyday items to sell at the fair.

The 1961 census recorded Ataura Khurd as comprising 4 hamlets, with a total population of 785 people (395 male and 390 female), in 143 households and 143 physical houses. The area of the village was given as 602 acres. Average attendance of the Durga Devi festival was about 1,500 at that time.

The 1981 census recorded Ataura Khurd as having a population of 1,190 people, in 135 households, and an area of 234.32 hectares. The main staple foods were given as wheat and rice.
