= Sultanpur Khera =

Sultanpur Khera Sultānpur Khera
- Village
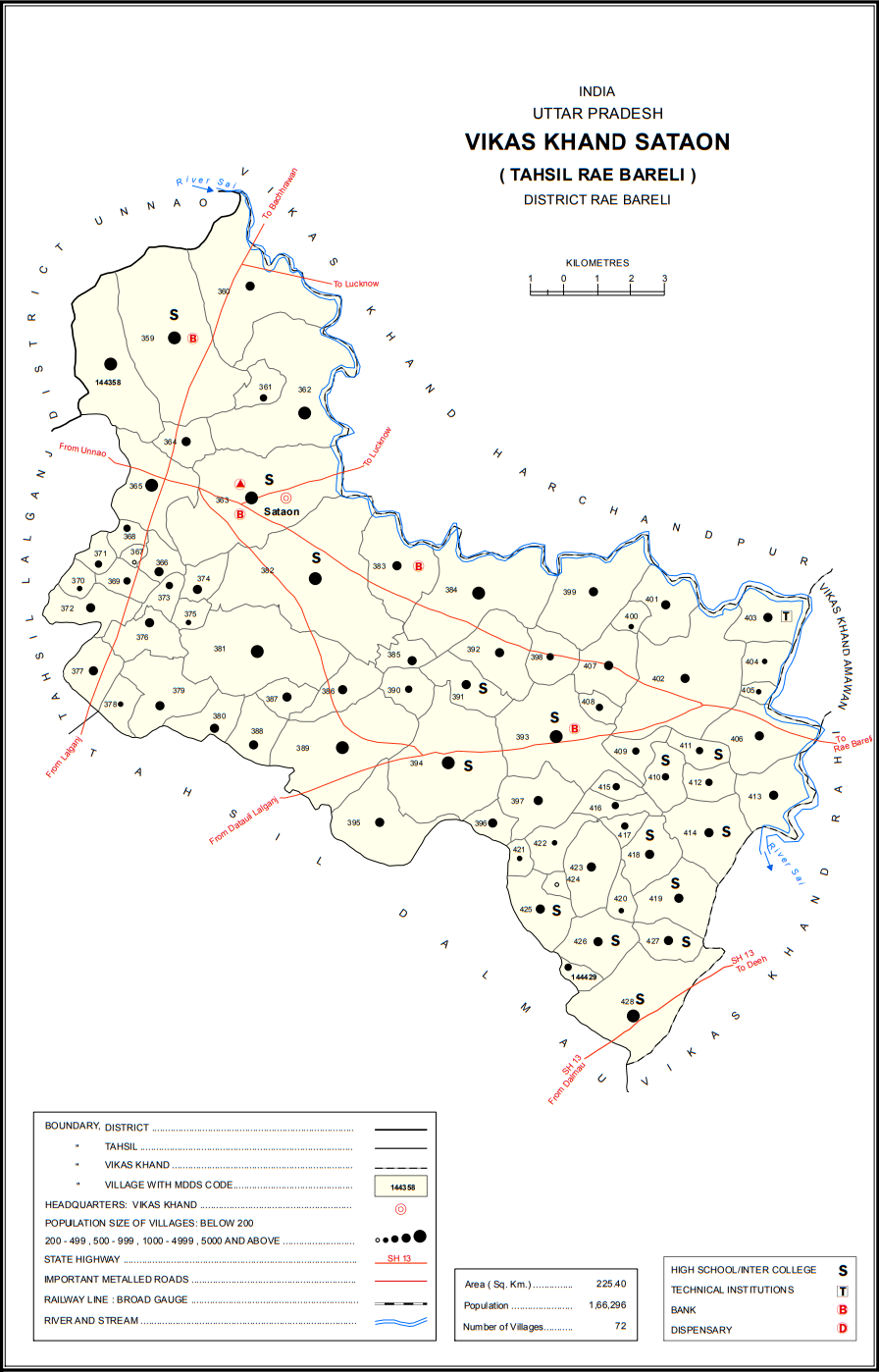
- Map showing Sultanpur Khera (#389) in Sataon CD block

- Location in Uttar Pradesh, India
- Coordinates: 26.237995°N 81.076259°E
- Country India: India
- State: Uttar Pradesh
- District: Raebareli

Area
  - Total: 8.043 km^{2} (3.105 sq mi)

Population (2011)
  - Total: 7,619
  - Density: 947.3/km^{2} (2,453/sq mi)

Languages
  - Official: Hindi
- Time zone: UTC+5:30 (IST)
- Vehicle registration: UP-35

Sultanpur Khera is a village in Sataon block of Rae Bareli district, Uttar Pradesh, India. As of 2011, its population was 7,619, in 1,384 households. It has 4 primary schools and no healthcare facilities. Sultanpur Khera hosts two festivals: one is dedicated to Parvin Devi and takes place on Chaitra Sudi 9, and the other is dedicated to Purvi Devi and takes place on Asvina Sudi 9. Vendors bring earthenware pottery, bangles, and various everyday items to sell at both festivals.

The 1961 census recorded Sultanpur Khera as comprising 14 hamlets, with a total population of 3,396 people (1,714 male and 1,682 female), in 646 households and 593 physical houses. The area of the village was given as 2,065 acres. It had a post office at that point, as well as the following small industrial establishments: 2 grain mills, 5 producers of edible fats and/or oils, 1 clothing manufacturer, and 1 manufacturer of ammunition, fireworks, or other explosives. Average attendance of both Devi festivals was about 500 people.

The 1981 census recorded Sultanpur Khera as having a population of 4,626 people, in 882 households, and having an area of 811.42 hectares. The main staple foods were given as wheat and rice.
