= Narauka =

- Village
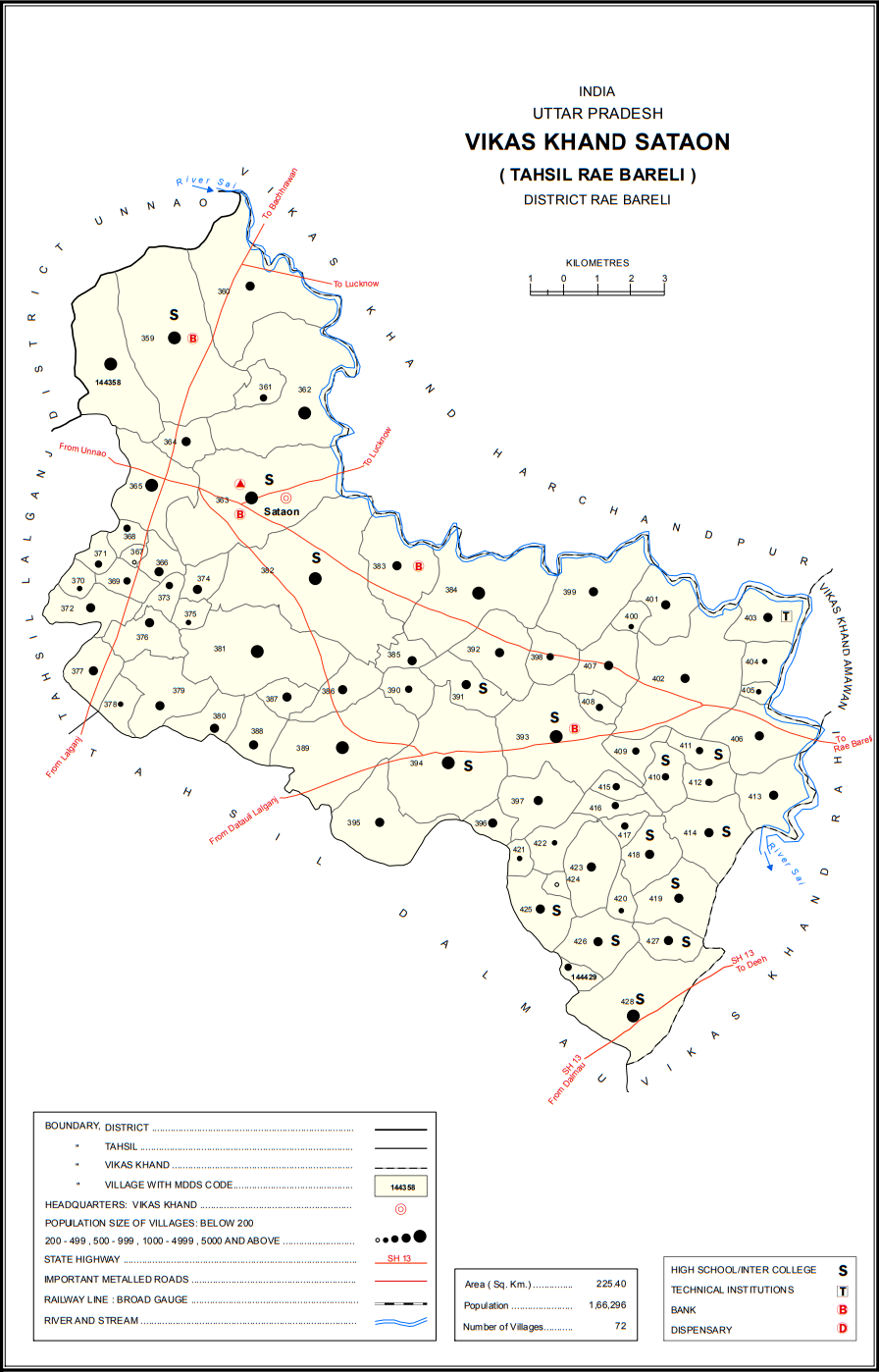
- Map showing Narauka (#144429) in Sataon CD block

- Location in Uttar Pradesh, India
- Coordinates: 26.168051°N 81.144515°E
- Country India: India
- State: Uttar Pradesh
- District: Raebareli

Area
  - Total: 0.875 km^{2} (0.338 sq mi)

Population (2011)
  - Total: 900
  - Density: 1,000/km^{2} (2,700/sq mi)

Languages
  - Official: Hindi
- Time zone: UTC+5:30 (IST)
- Vehicle registration: UP-35

Narauka is a village in the Sataon block of Rae Bareli district, Uttar Pradesh, India. It is located 15 km from Raebareli, the district headquarters. As of 2011, its population is 900, living in 163 households. It has one primary school and no healthcare facilities.

The 1961 census recorded Narauka as comprising three hamlets, with a total population of 457 people (221 male and 236 female), in 100 households and 93 physical houses. The area of the village was given as 218 acres.

The 1981 census recorded Narauka as having a population of 664 people, in 129 households, and having an area of 88.22 hectares. The main staple foods were given as wheat and rice.
