= Chandai Raghunathpur =

- Village
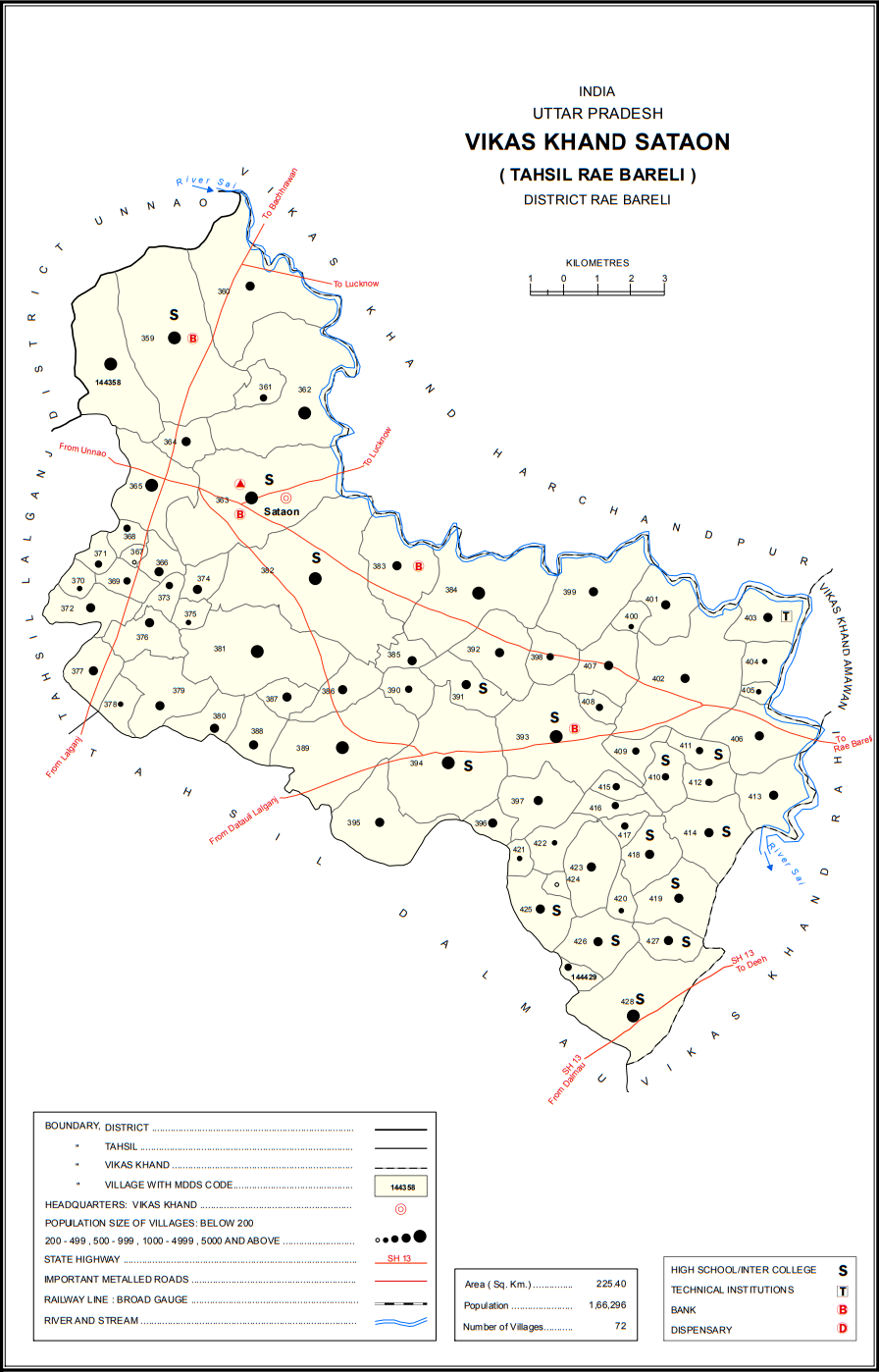
- Map showing Chandai Raghunathpur (#392) in Sataon CD block

- Location in Uttar Pradesh, India
- Coordinates: 26.249514°N 81.125165°E
- Country India: India
- State: Uttar Pradesh
- District: Raebareli

Area
  - Total: 3.221 km^{2} (1.244 sq mi)

Population (2011)
  - Total: 2,077
  - Density: 644.8/km^{2} (1,670/sq mi)

Languages
  - Official: Hindi
- Time zone: UTC+5:30 (IST)
- Vehicle registration: UP-35

Chandai Raghunathpur is a village in Sataon block of Rae Bareli district, Uttar Pradesh, India. It is located 14 km from Raebareli, the district headquarters. As of 2011, its population is 2,077, in 395 households. It has one primary school and no healthcare facilities.

The 1961 census recorded Chandai Raghunathpur as comprising 2 hamlets, with a total population of 870 people (448 male and 422 female), in 171 households and 163 physical houses. The area of the village was given as 834 acres.

The 1981 census recorded Chandai Raghunathpur as having a population of 1,245 people, in 231 households, and having an area of 313.24 hectares. The main staple foods were given as wheat and rice.
