= Nakphulha =

- Village
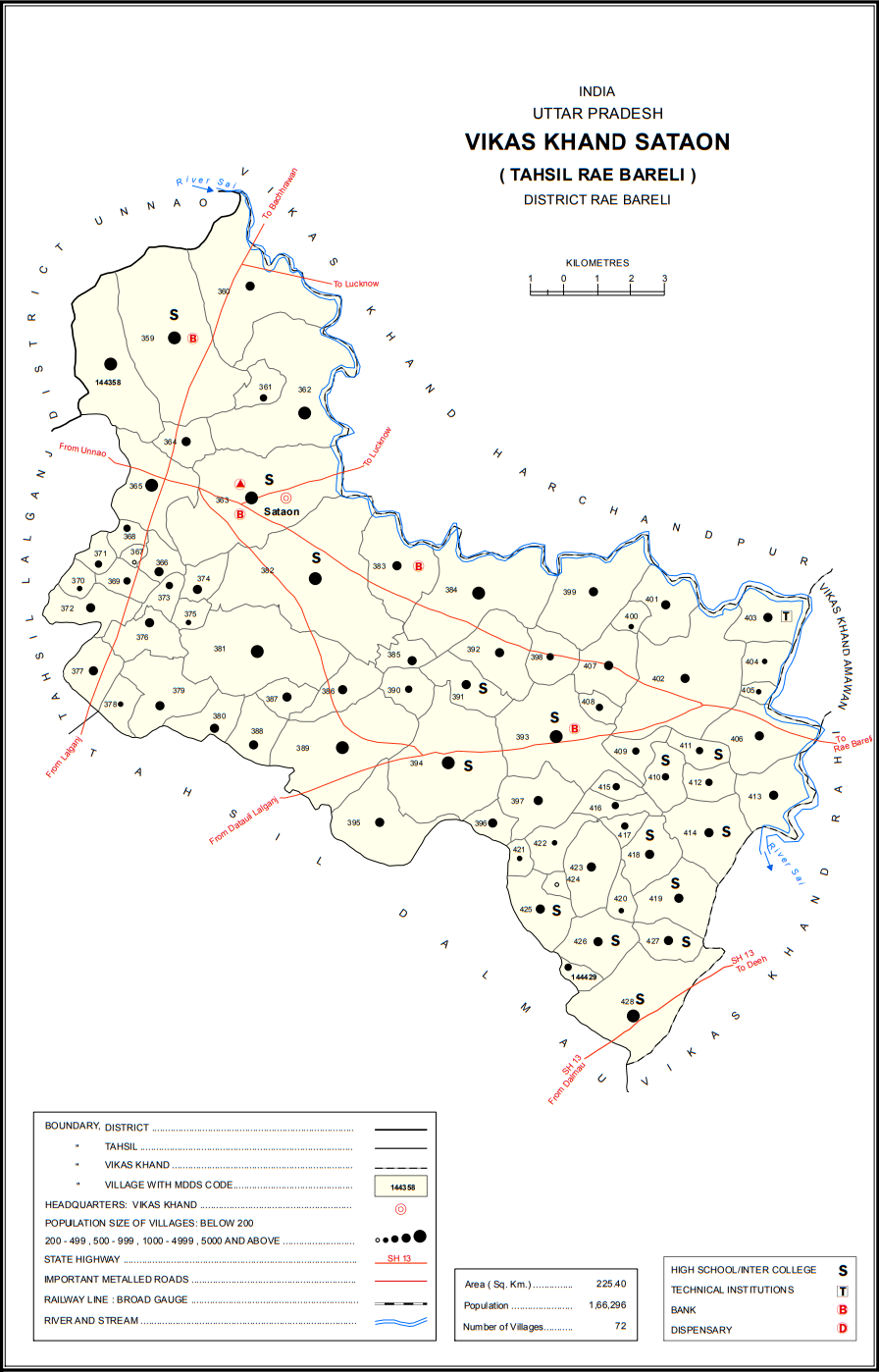
- Map showing Nakphulha (#414) in Sataon CD block

- Location in Uttar Pradesh, India
- Coordinates: 26.203561°N 81.184902°E
- Country India: India
- State: Uttar Pradesh
- District: Raebareli

Area
  - Total: 3.787 km^{2} (1.462 sq mi)

Population (2011)
  - Total: 2,517
  - Density: 664.6/km^{2} (1,721/sq mi)

Languages
  - Official: Hindi
- Time zone: UTC+5:30 (IST)
- Vehicle registration: UP-35

Nakphulha is a village in Sataon block of Rae Bareli district, Uttar Pradesh, India. It is located 8 km from Raebareli, the district headquarters. As of 2011, its population is 2,517, in 467 households. It has one primary school and no healthcare facilities.

The 1961 census recorded Nakphulha as comprising 2 hamlets, with a total population of 848 people (449 male and 399 female), in 192 households and 181 physical houses. The area of the village was given as 941 acres and it had a post office at that point.

The 1981 census recorded Nakphulha (as "Nakfulha") as having a population of 1,001 people, in 270 households, and having an area of 378.80 hectares. The main staple foods were given as wheat and rice.
