= Konsa, Raebareli =

Konsa
- Village
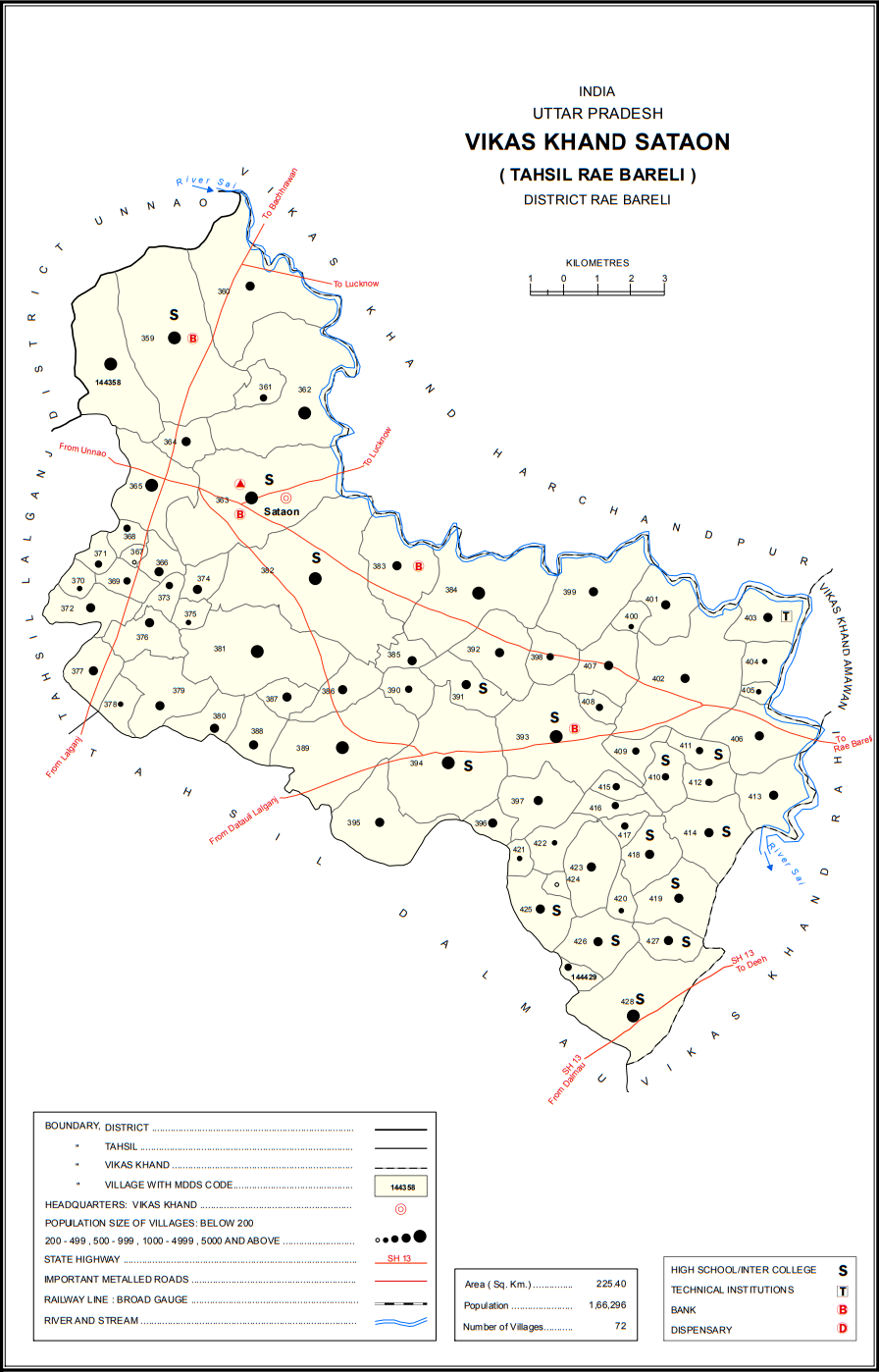
- Map showing Konsa (#359) in Sataon CD block

- Location in Uttar Pradesh, India
- Coordinates: 26.339031°N 81.024053°E
- Country India: India
- State: Uttar Pradesh
- District: Raebareli

Area
  - Total: 10.322 km^{2} (3.985 sq mi)

Population (2011)
  - Total: 6,797
  - Density: 658.5/km^{2} (1,705/sq mi)

Languages
  - Official: Hindi
- Time zone: UTC+5:30 (IST)
- Vehicle registration: UP-35

Konsa is a village in Sataon block of Rae Bareli district, Uttar Pradesh, India. It is located 27 km from Raebareli, the district headquarters. As of 2011, its population is 6,797, in 1,255 households. It has one primary school and no healthcare facilities. It hosts a market twice per week, on Mondays and Fridays, which has grain and cloth as the main items of trade.

The 1961 census recorded Konsa as comprising 28 hamlets, with a total population of 7,112 people (3,767 male and 3,345 female), in 1,380 households and 1,272 physical houses. The area of the village was given as 6,976 acres. It had a post office and medical practitioner at that point, as well as 2 grain mills and 1 producer of edible fats and/or oils. Average attendance of the twice-weekly market was about 500.

The 1981 census recorded Konsa as having a population of 10,123 people, in 1,809 households, and having an area of 1,137.61 hectares. The main staple foods were given as juwar and bajra.
