= Purai =

Purai Porai
- Village
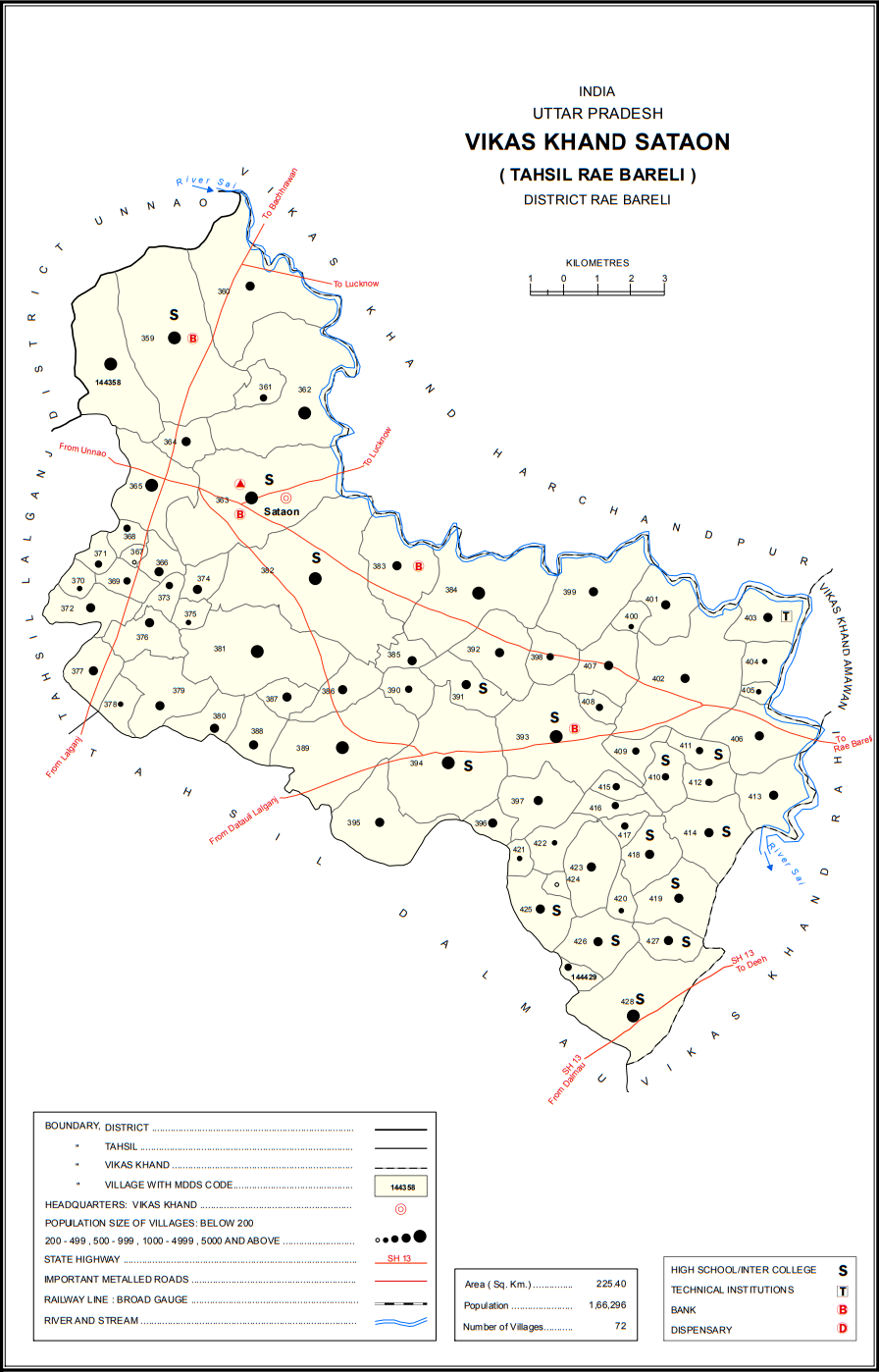
- Map showing Purai (#384) in Sataon CD block

- Location in Uttar Pradesh, India
- Coordinates: 26.265896°N 81.109583°E
- Country India: India
- State: Uttar Pradesh
- District: Raebareli

Area
  - Total: 8.005 km^{2} (3.091 sq mi)

Population (2011)
  - Total: 5,652
  - Density: 706.1/km^{2} (1,829/sq mi)

Languages
  - Official: Hindi
- Time zone: UTC+5:30 (IST)
- Vehicle registration: UP-35

Purai is a village in Sataon block of Rae Bareli district, Uttar Pradesh, India. It is located 15 km west of Raebareli, the district headquarters, near the point where the Basaha stream joins the Sai river.

As of 2011, the population of Purai was 5,652, in 1,108 households. There were four primary schools and no healthcare facilities in the village.

The 1961 census recorded Purai (here spelled "Porai") as comprising 13 hamlets, with a total population of 2,303 people (1,190 male and 1,113 female), in 445 households and 400 physical houses. The area of the village was given as 1,979 acres.

The 1981 census recorded Purai (here spelled "Porai") as having a population of 3,656 people, in 701 households, and having an area of 796.45 hectares. The main staple foods were given as wheat and rice.
