= Chandwal =

- Village
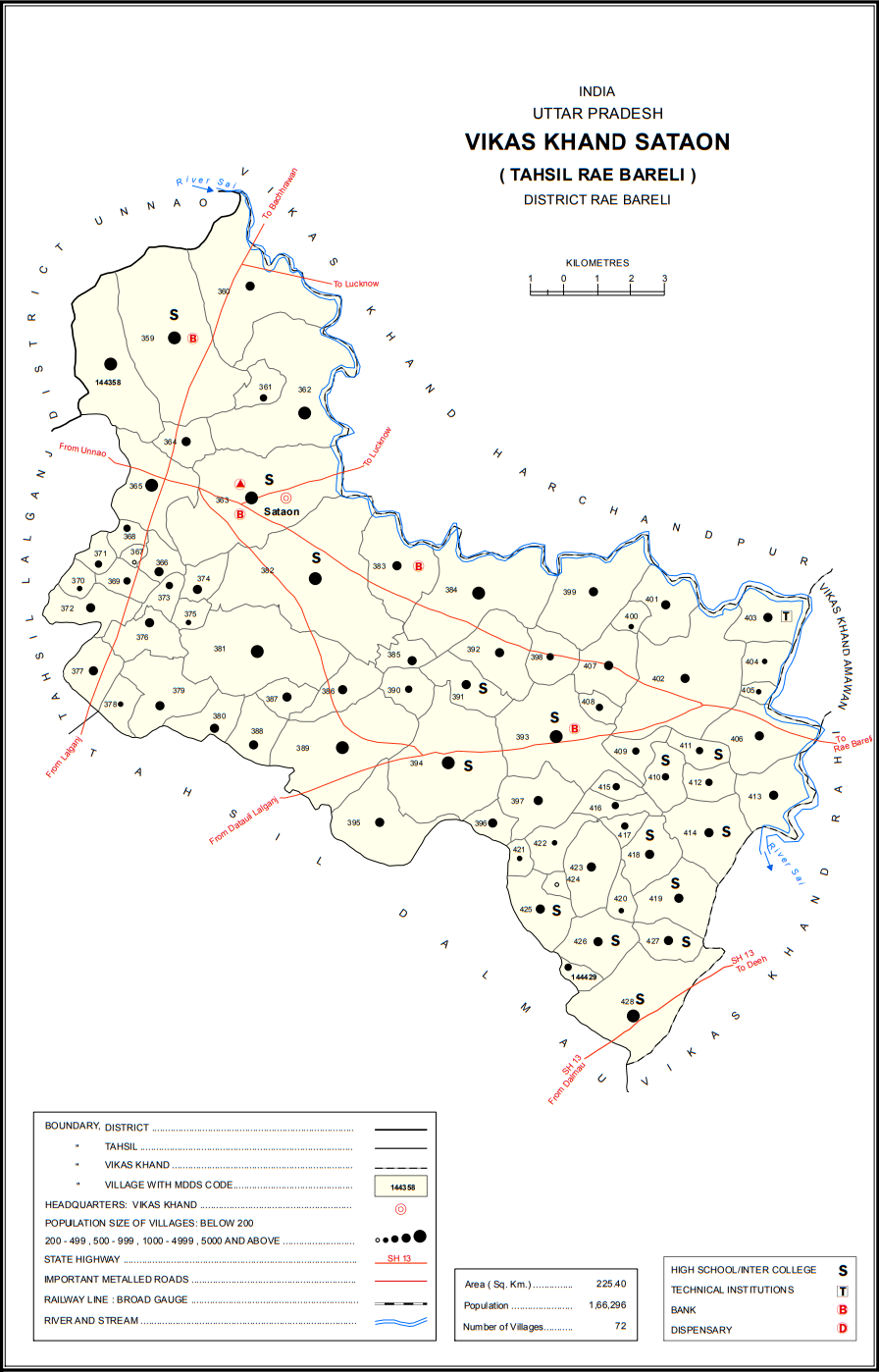
- Map showing Chandwal (#385) in Sataon CD block

- Location in Uttar Pradesh, India
- Coordinates: 26.253812°N 81.095404°E
- Country India: India
- State: Uttar Pradesh
- District: Raebareli

Area
  - Total: 2.22 km^{2} (0.86 sq mi)

Population (2011)
  - Total: 1,112
  - Density: 501/km^{2} (1,300/sq mi)

Languages
  - Official: Hindi
- Time zone: UTC+5:30 (IST)
- Vehicle registration: UP-35

Chandwal is a village in Sataon block of Rae Bareli district, Uttar Pradesh, India. As of 2011, its population is 1,112, in 225 households. It has one primary school and no healthcare facilities.

The 1961 census recorded Chandwal as comprising 1 hamlet, with a total population of 388 people (210 male and 178 female), in 74 households and 71 physical houses. The area of the village was given as 290 acres.

The 1981 census recorded Chandwal as having a population of 361 people, in 63 households, and having an area of 117.36 hectares. The main staple foods were given as wheat and rice.
