= Malikmau Chaubara =

Malikmau Chaubara Malikmau Chaubāra
- Village
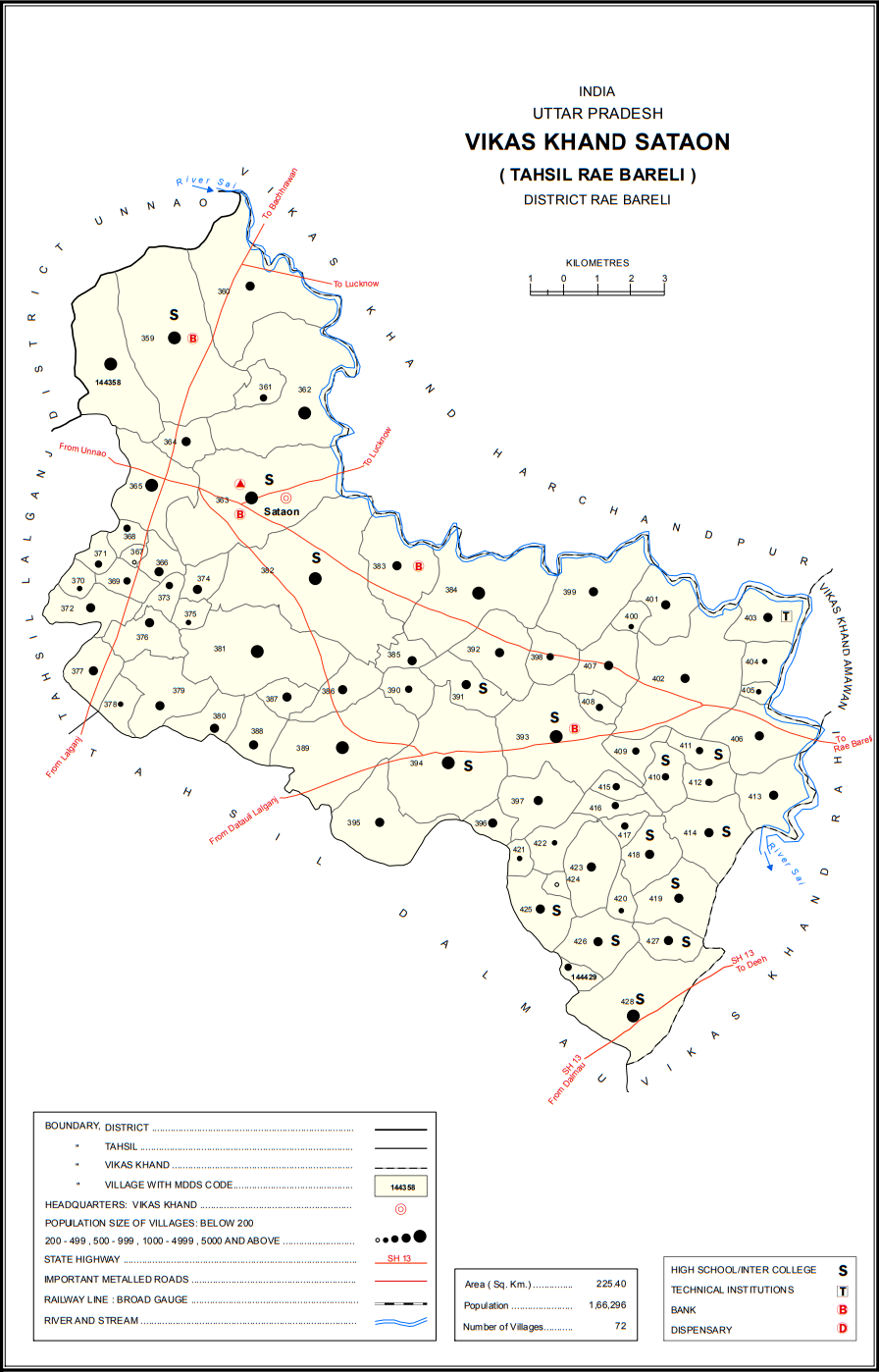
- Map showing Malikmau Chaubara (#383) in Sataon CD block

- Location in Uttar Pradesh, India
- Coordinates: 26.27167°N 81.087228°E
- Country India: India
- State: Uttar Pradesh
- District: Raebareli

Area
  - Total: 3.987 km^{2} (1.539 sq mi)

Population (2011)
  - Total: 3,432
  - Density: 860.8/km^{2} (2,229/sq mi)

Languages
  - Official: Hindi
- Time zone: UTC+5:30 (IST)
- Vehicle registration: UP-33

Malikmau Chaubara is a village in Sataon block of Rae Bareli district, Uttar Pradesh, India. It is located 11 km from Raebareli, the district headquarters. As of 2011, its population is 3,432, in 659 households. It has one primary school and no healthcare facilities.

The 1961 census recorded Malikmau Chaubara as comprising 8 hamlets, with a total population of 1,362 people (697 male and 665 female), in 282 households and 269 physical houses. The area of the village was given as 980 acres and it had a post office at that point.

The 1981 census recorded Malikmau Chaubara as having a population of 2,294 people, in 437 households, and having an area of 394.58 hectares. The main staple foods were given as wheat and rice.
