= Salarpur, Sataon =

Salarpur Salārpur
- Village
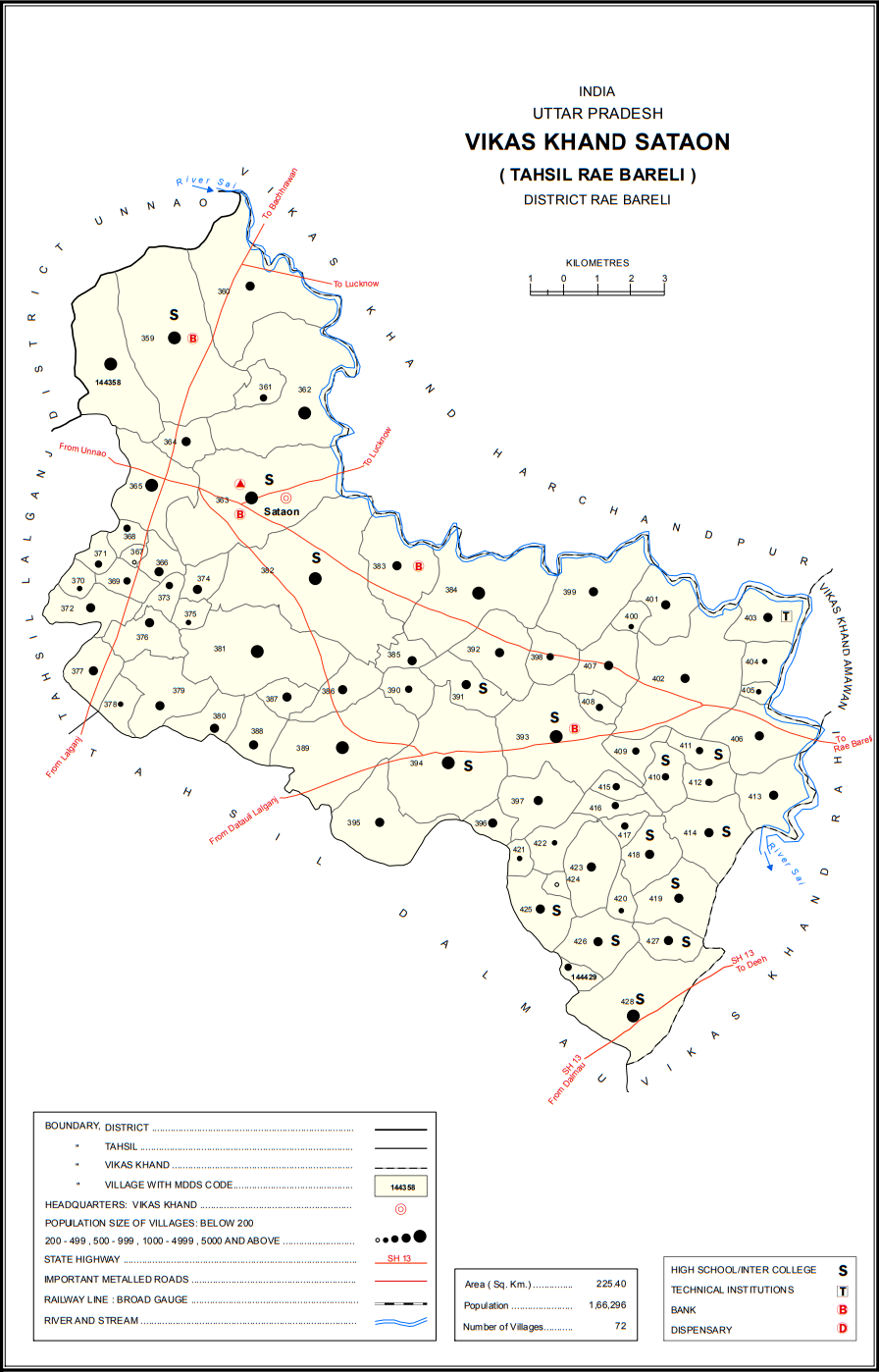
- Map showing Salarpur (#403) in Sataon CD block

- Location in Uttar Pradesh, India
- Coordinates: 26.260431°N 81.210155°E
- Country India: India
- State: Uttar Pradesh
- District: Raebareli

Area
  - Total: 2.713 km^{2} (1.047 sq mi)

Population (2011)
  - Total: 1,462
  - Density: 538.9/km^{2} (1,396/sq mi)

Languages
  - Official: Hindi
- Time zone: UTC+5:30 (IST)
- Vehicle registration: UP-35

Salarpur is a village in Sataon block of Rae Bareli district, Uttar Pradesh, India. It is located 8 km from Raebareli, the district headquarters. As of 2011, its population is 1,462, in 288 households. It has one primary school and no healthcare facilities.

The 1961 census recorded Salarpur as comprising 1 hamlet, with a total population of 631 people (337 male and 294 female), in 115 households and 115 physical houses. The area of the village was given as 670 acres.

The 1981 census recorded Salarpur as having a population of 887 people, in 182 households, and having an area of 269.53 hectares. The main staple foods were given as wheat and rice.
