= Shankarpur =

- Rural
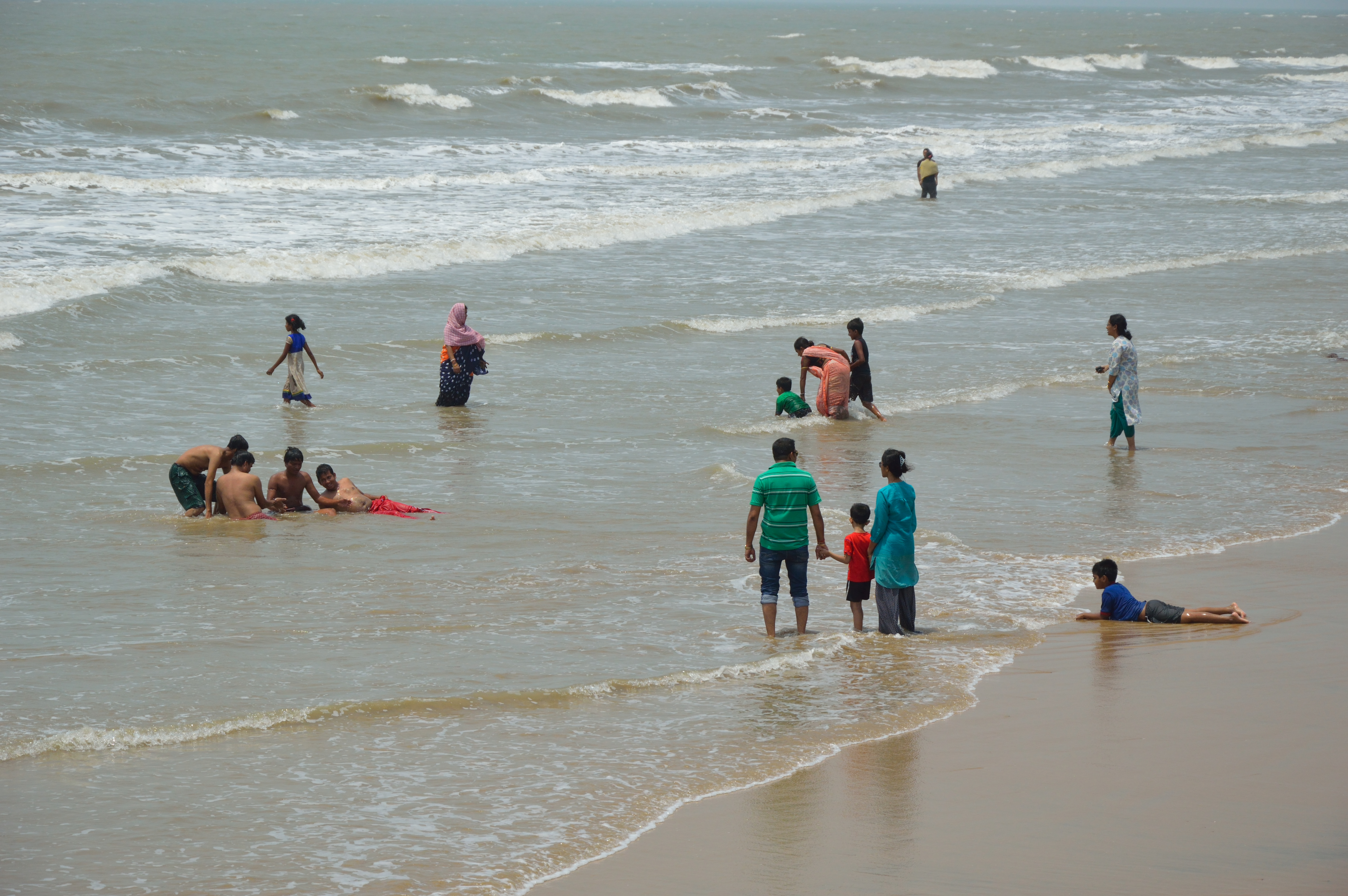
- Shankarpur Beach

- Location within West Bengal Location within India
- Coordinates: 21.6344°N 87.5698°E
- Country: India
- State: West Bengal
- Development Authority: Digha Sankarpur Development Authority (DSDA)
- Time zone: UTC+5.30 (IST)
- Website: wb.gov.in

Shankarpur is a beach village located 14 km east of Digha in West Bengal, India. It is also a regular fishing harbour. Shankarpur contains a number of temples.

== Geography ==
Cities and towns in Contai subdivision of Purba Medinipur district
M: municipal city/ town, CT: census town, R: rural/ urban centre, H: historical/ religious centre, S: port, sea-beach
Owing to space constraints in the small map, the actual locations in a larger map may vary slightly

=== Location ===
Shankarpur is located in the Purba Medinipur District of the state of West Bengal, Shankarpur is a beach destination along the Digha-Contai Road which is fast gaining popularity as a tourist spot. It is at a distance of about 185 km from the capital city Kolkata, and about 14 km from the famous beach town Digha.

== Transport ==
=== Bus services ===
There is frequent bus service to Digha from Dharmatala bus stand of Kolkata and many other parts of West Bengal. It is almost a 5-hour journey from Kolkata. Bus service is also available from towns across West Bengal such as Midnapore, Bankura, Asansol, Bardhaman, Howrah and, also from Orissa via Balasore (Baleswar). Nearest bus stops of Shankarpur are "14 Mile" or at "Ramnagar". From both of the places tracker service or van service is available.

=== Train services ===
- 2857 Tamralipta express Howrah Dep time 6:40AM Digha flag station 10 AM
- 8001 Kandari express Howrah Dep time 7:50AM Digha flag station 12 PM
- 5722 Paharia express Howrah Dep time 2:15PM Digha flag station 5:50 PM
- 12847 Duronto Express Howrah Dep time 11:15AM Digha flag station 2.15 PM

== Gallery ==
Sankarpur Beach. May, 2015
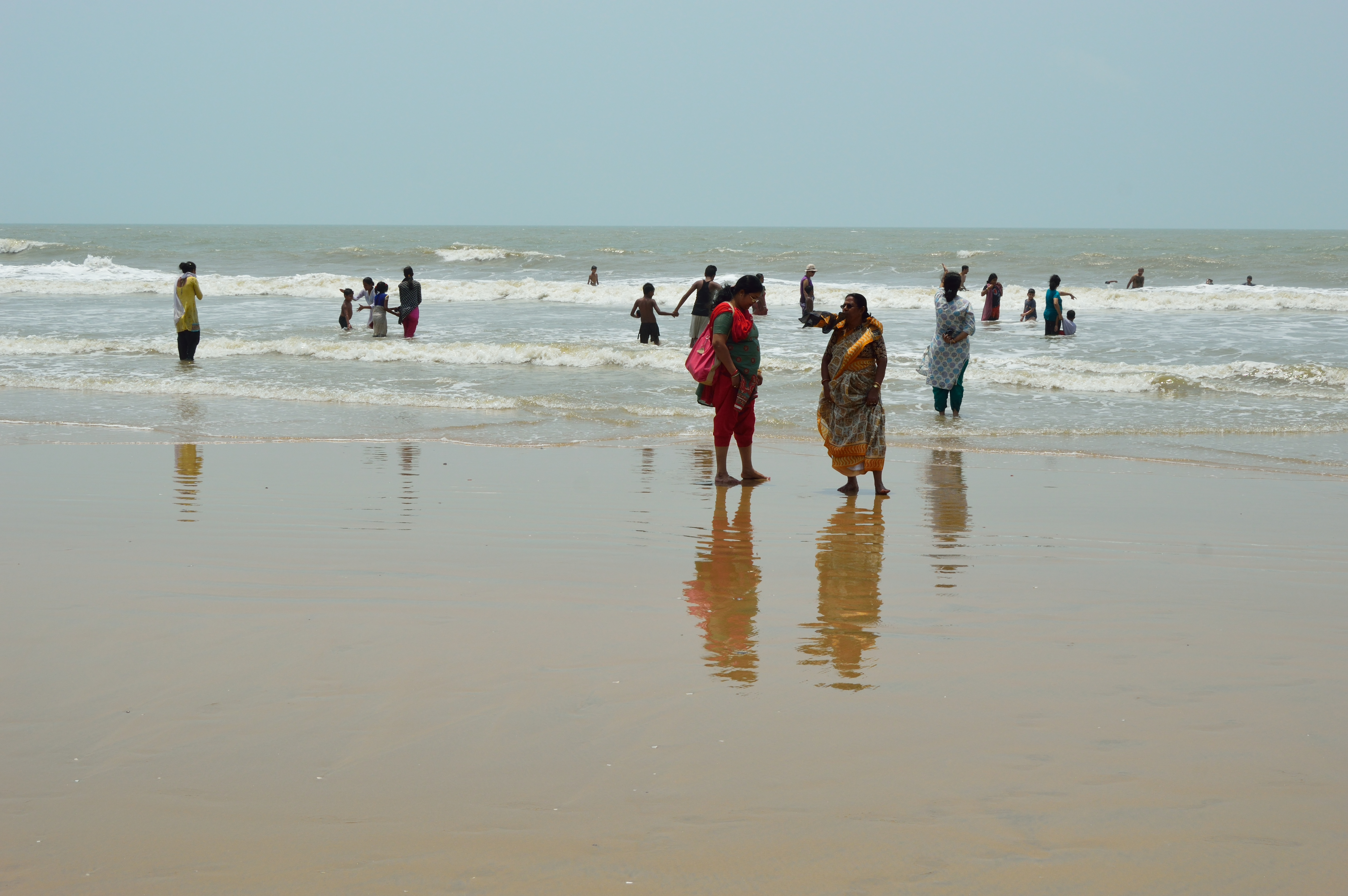

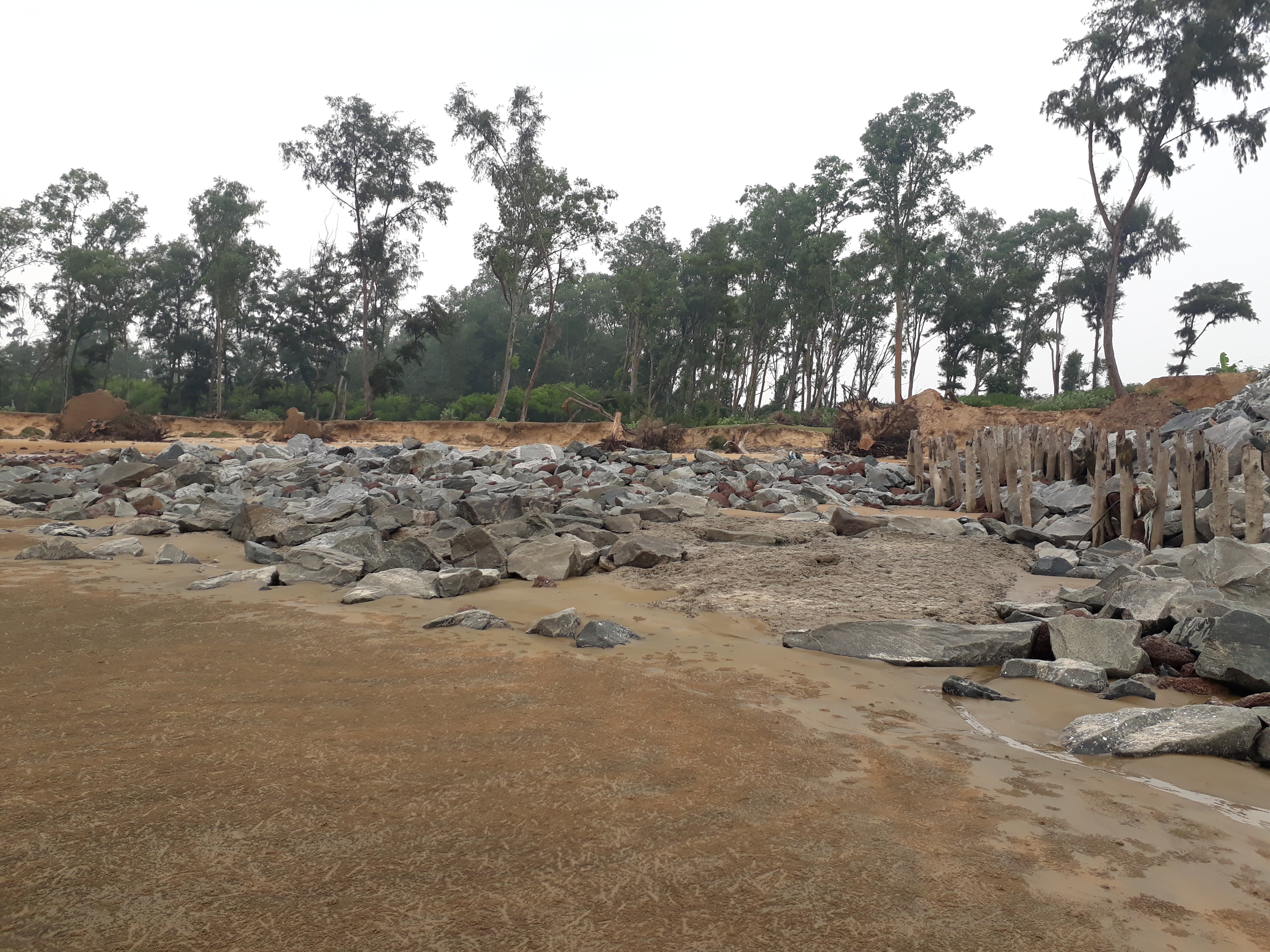

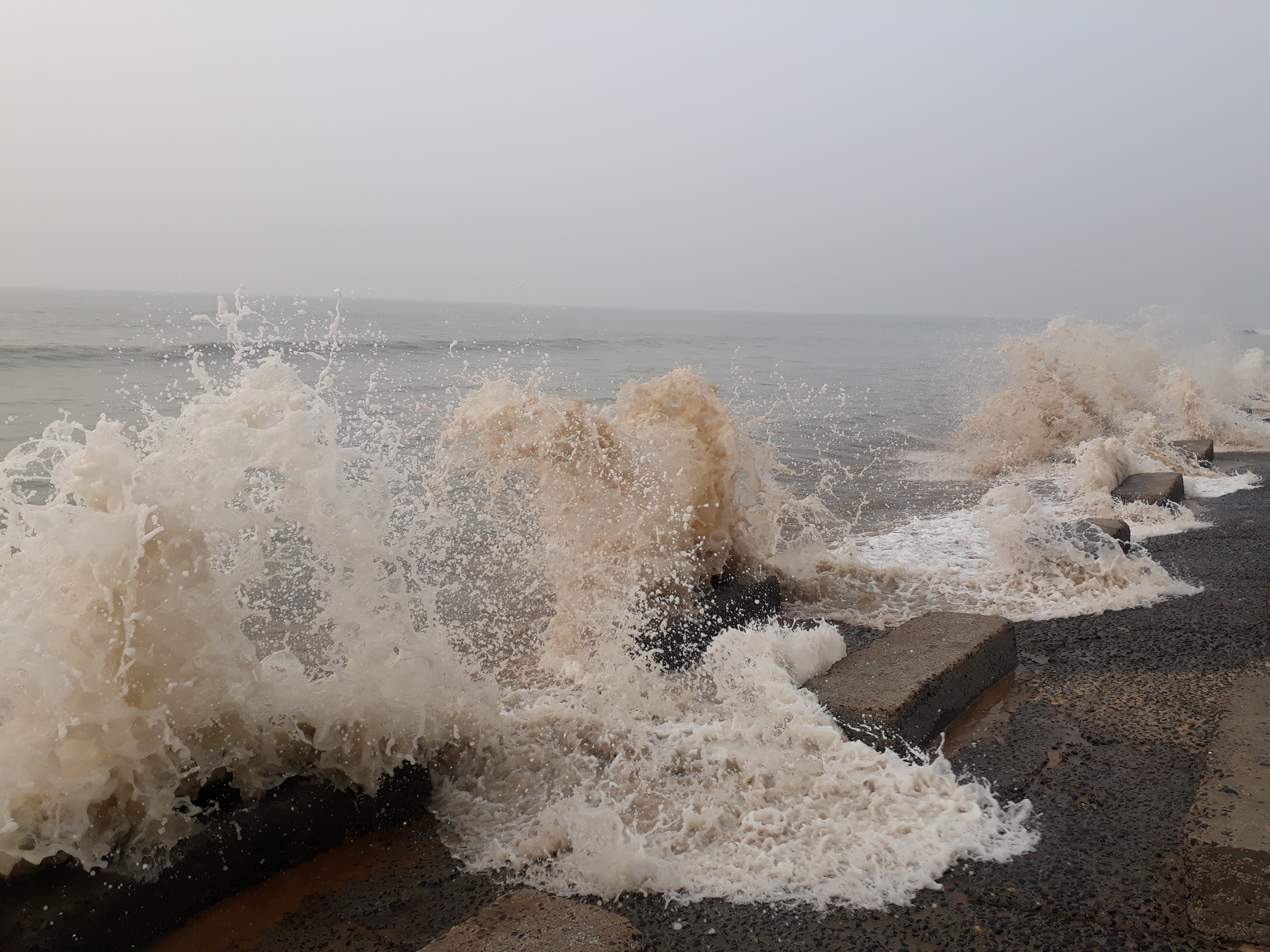
