= Pahu =

Musical instrument

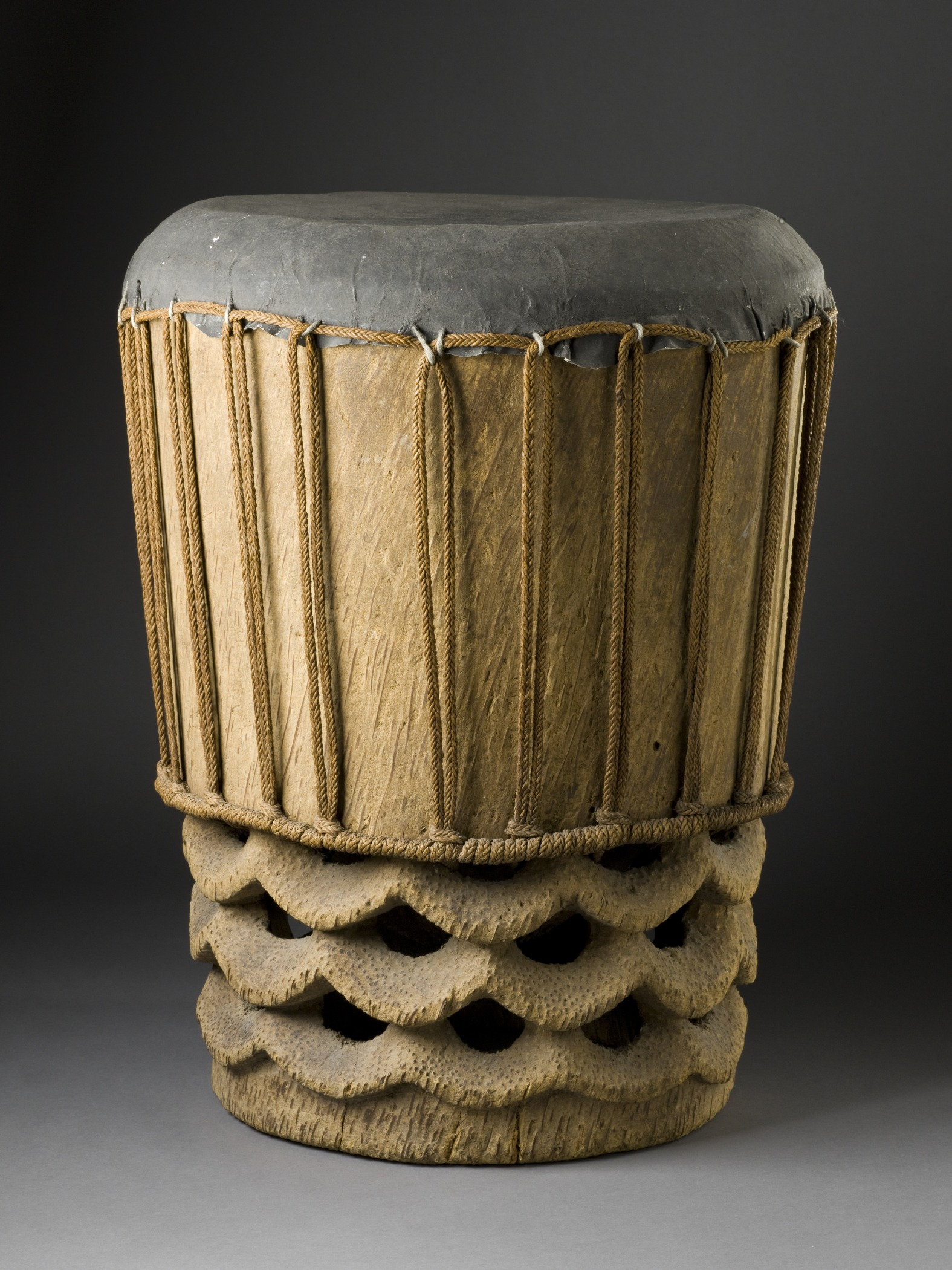
Pahu

The term "pahu" is a general word for drum in Hawaiian culture however, there are a variety of them. To fully understand the "pahu" as it pertains to dance, it's important to consider the following explanation.

Since the mid-1800s, the term "hula" has been widely used to encompass all aspects of Hawaiian dance. Historically, however, ancient Hawaiians used two distinct terms to describe dance movements. "Hula" specifically referred to formalized dance performed by humans in non-sacred contexts. In contrast, "haʻa" was the term used for formalized movements performed in sacred or mourning contexts. "Haʻa" was also performed by deities and non-human entities, including personified natural forces like flowers, birds, trees, winds, or lava, as well as puppets (kiʻi). The confusion between "hula" and "haʻa", particularly regarding the sacred nature of the dance, is largely attributed to Emerson, who did not differentiate between the two in early written accounts.

Example:

In a chant for Queen Emma;

Pā ka makani, naue ka lau o ka niu The wind blows, the leaves of the coconut sway

"Haʻa" ka pua kowali i ke kula The morning glory blossoms dance/move on the plain.

Example:

Aia la o Pele i Hawaiʻi ea Pele is in Hawaiʻi

E "haʻa" mai la i Maukele ea. She is ritually moving at Maukele

The use of both "haʻa" and "hula" in the following texts reveals usages of the terms:

1. Ke "haʻa" la Puna i ka makani la, Puna is dancing in the breeze

2. "Haʻa" ka ulu hala i Keaʻau The hala groves of Keaʻau are dancing.

3. "Haʻa" Haʻena me Hopoe Haʻena and Hopoe dance

4. ʻAmi i kai o Nanahuki e Swaying by the sea of Nanahuki

5. "Hula" leʻa wale i kai o Nanahuki e Just a delightful dance in the sea of Nanahuki

Based on these facts the terms hula "pahu" and "pahu hula" seemingly are oxymorons, and experts in "hula" do not pass on this information to their students but it is not intentional.

According to Kaeppler's research, "haʻa" was reintroduced in the 1930s through mele mentioned by Keakaokala Kanahele and Luika Kaio. However, by this time, it was no longer called "haʻa" but was referred to as "hula pahu".

In Adrienne L. Kaeppler's book Hula Pahu Volume I, pages 15-18, she says that the "pahu" and the "kaʻeke" were two different drums as does Emerson. She also says that these two drums can be categorized as follows;

"in sacred contexts during heiau ceremonies, in association with mele pule, the "pahu" sent forth its sound as hoʻoheihei, and its associated movement dimension was "haʻa";

In contexts of honoring or entertaining, in association with allusive poetry, the "kaʻeke" drum, was augmented by a secondary drum known as "pūniu" or "kilu", sent forth sound as "kaʻekeʻeke" and the corresponding movement dimension was "hula." (Structured movements done by humans in non-sacred and joyous context - are the movements of dance.)

"Haʻa" was performed as a religious sacrament in movement (or emotional outpouring of grief when used in laments), while "hula" consisted of social metaphors in movement.

Here is an excerpt for Emersonʻs book The Long Voyages of the Ancient Hawaiians, page 22. “One important piece of baggage that Laʻa-mai-kahiki, as he is from this time to be called, brought with him was his "kaʻekeʻeke" drum, consisting of a hollow, carved log. covered, as to its open mouth, with a tightly drawn head of shark-skin. Laʻa-maikahiki seems to have set great store by his drum, his priests and his idol, and always kept them by him even in his travels.

In Trum’s Hawaiian Folk Tales A Collection of Native Legends, page 187 he tells of a drum called the "pahu kaʻeke" in the story of Ai Kanaka.

Below is what is widely believed today among hula practitioners.

The pahu is a traditional musical instrument found in Polynesia: Hawaii, Tahiti, Cook Islands, Samoa, and Tokelau. Carved from a single log and covered on the playing end with a stretched sharkskin, the pahu is played with the palms and fingers of the hand. It is considered a sacred instrument and was generally kept in a temple (heiau), and used to accompany a repertoire of sacred songs called hula pahu/ura paʻu.

The Hawaiian term pahu translates into 'drum,' ‘Niu’ being the Hawaiian word for ‘coconut.' Although there are a number of specific types of percussion instruments used in Hawaiian cultural expressions of music, the Pahu is perhaps one of the most important percussion devices known to Hawaiʻi, both ancient and modern, of the four main indigenous musical types (wooden drums, knee drums, calabash drums, and bamboo pipes).

Pahu may be found in the Hawaiian Islands in two main and distinctly different, but contextually related forms. The first is regarded as the Heiau Pahu, or religious drum (also known as the Pahu Puʻule, or 'prayer drum'). The second has come to us in the form of the Hula Pahu, or musical accompaniment drum (sometimes referred to as the Pahu Mele, or song accompaniment drum). Both types of drum have a common ancient historical source.

The pahu drum is a staple in traditional Hawaiian dance, providing a basic rhythmic accompaniment. The drums' tall, narrow body is carved from wood, usually from a segment of a coconut tree trunk, and the head is made from dried sharkskin. The traditional Hawaiian Pahu was made from a sectioned and seasoned wooden tree trunk, preferably of coconut wood, although possibly other types of native wood may have been used. The original material used for the Pahu's waha (head) was either shark or ray skin. Heiau Pahu tended to be originally made with a waha of ray skin, while non-religious Pahu often used sharkskin. The Pahu is played with the bare hands and fingers.

== See also ==
- Hula
- Pate (musical instrument)
