= Cory =

- Gender: Unisex
- Language: Greek, Nordic, Gaelic

Origin
- Meaning: Maiden, In a cauldron, In a Hollow, Descendant of Comhraidheh

Other names
- Related names: Corey, Cora, Coire, Corie, Corrie, Curry, Correy, Cori, Kory, Khouri, Kori, Korie

As a given name, Cory is used by both males and females. It is a variation of the name Cora, meaning "(the) Maiden", which is a title of the goddess Persephone. The name also can have origins from the Gaelic word coire, which means "in a cauldron", or "in a hollow".

As a surname, it has a number of possible derivations, including an Old Norse personal name Kori of uncertain meaning, which is found in Scandinavia and England. As an Irish surname it comes from Ó Comhraidhe (descendant of Comhraidheh).

== Notable people or fictional characters named Cory include ==
- Cory Aldridge (born 1979), American baseball player
- Cory Alexander (born 1973), American basketball player
- Cory Arcangel (born 1978), American digital artist
- Cory Asbury (born 1985), American musician and pastor
- Cory Barlog (born 1975), American video game developer.
- Cory Bent (born 1997), English footballer
- Cory Booker (born 1969), American politician from New Jersey
- Cory Bowles (born 1973), Canadian actor and choreographer
- Cory Cadden (1969–2017), Canadian ice hockey player
- Cory Carr (born 1975), American-Israeli basketball player
- Cory Conacher (born 1989), Canadian ice hockey player
- Cory Cory-Wright (1838–1909), British businessman
- Cory Cotton (born 1987), writer and member of the American sports conglomerate Dude Perfect
- Cory Cyrenne (born 1977), Canadian ice hockey player
- Cory Doctorow (born 1971), Canadian journalist and author
- Cory Doran (born 1982), Canadian voice actor
- Cory Edwards, American writer and director
- Cory Everson (born 1958), American bodybuilder and actress
- Cory Finley, American screenwriter, playwright, and director
- Cory Fong (born 1972), American public servant
- Cory Gearrin (born 1986), American baseball player
- Cory Gibbs (born 1980), American association footballer
- Cory Hardrict (born 1979), American actor
- Cory Henry (born 1987), American pianist, organist and singer-songwriter
- Cory Jane (born 1983), New Zealand rugby player
- Cory Kennedy (model) (born 1990), American model
- Cory Kennedy (skateboarder), American skateboarder
- Cory La Quay, American drummer, A Skylit Drive
- Cory Lerios (born 1951), American pianist and vocalist
- Cory Leslie (born 1989), American steeplechase runner
- Cory Lewis (born 2000), American baseball player
- Cory Lidle (1972–2006), American baseball player
- Cory Marks, Canadian singer
- Cory McGrath (born 1979), Australian footballer
- Cory Monteith (1982–2013), Canadian actor
- Cory Morgan (ice hockey) (born 1978), Canadian ice hockey player
- Cory Morrow (born 1972), American singer-songwriter
- Cory Nelms (born 1988), American football player
- Cory Paterson (born 1987), Australian rugby player
- Cory Pecker (born 1981), Canadian ice hockey player
- Cory Philpot (born 1970), Canadian football player
- Cory Quirino (born 1953), Filipino TV host
- Cory Redding (born 1980), American football player
- Cory Rooney, American songwriter and record producer
- Cory Sarich (born 1978), Canadian ice hockey player
- Cory Schlesinger (born 1972), American footballer
- Cory Spangenberg (born 1991), American baseball player
- Cory Spinks (born 1978), American boxer
- Cory Stillman (born 1973), Canadian ice hockey player
- Cory Sullivan (born 1979), American baseball player
- Cory Trice (born 2000), American football player
- Cory Vidanes (born 1962), Filipina executive and businesswoman
- Cory Wade (born 1983), American baseball player
- Cory Walker (born 1980), American comic book artist
- Cory Wells (1941–2015), American singer
- Cory T. Williams, American attorney and Democratic politician
- Cory Williams (born 1981), American YouTube personality
- Cory DeVante Williams (born 1992), American YouTube personality
- Cory Witherill (born 1971), American race car driver
- Cory Wong (born c. 1985), American guitarist

== Surname ==
- Annie Sophie Cory (1868–1952), English author
- Asa Howe Cory (1814–1892), American soldier
- Arthur Cory (1880–1974), American politician
- Charles B. Cory (1857–1921), American ornithologist and golfer
- Clifford Cory (1859–1941), Welsh coal owner and politician
- Donald Webster Cory, pen name of Edward Sagarin (1913–1986)
- Eleanor Cory (born 1943), American composer
- Fanny Cory, American illustrator of the Little Miss Muffet comic book
- Florence Elizabeth Cory (1851–1902), American industrial designer and school founder
- George Cory (historian) (1862–1935), South African chemist and historian
- George Norton Cory (1874–1968), Canadian Lieutenant-General
- J. Campbell Cory (1867–1925), American cartoonist
- John Cory (1828–1910), British philanthropist, coal-owner, and shipowner
- John M. Cory (1914–1988), American librarian
- Judith A. Cory, Oscar-nominated makeup artist
- Kate Cory (1861–1958), American photographer and painter
- Peter Cory (1925–2020), Canadian jurist
- Robert Cory, English churchman and moral philosopher
- William Johnson Cory (1823–1892), English educator and poet
- William Wallace Cory (1865–1943), Canadian politician

== Nickname ==
- Corazon Aquino (1933–2009), Filipino politician and president

== Fictional characters ==
- Cory Baxter, from the TV series That's So Raven and Cory in the House
- Cory Matthews, from the TV series Boy Meets World and Girl Meets World
- "Richard Cory", the subject of an 1897 poem by Edwin Arlington Robinson
- The Cory family, from the soap opera Another World

== See also ==
- Coree (disambiguation)
- Corey
- Cori (disambiguation)
- Corie, given name
- Corrie (given name)
- Corrie (surname)
- Kori (disambiguation)
- Kory (given name)
- Korey, given name and surname
- Kory (disambiguation), includes a list of people with the surname Kory
