= Cory (disambiguation) =

Cory is a given name and a surname.

Cory may also refer to:

== Places in the United States ==
- Cory, Colorado, an unincorporated town
- Cory, Indiana, an unincorporated town

== Other uses ==
- Corydoras ("cory"), a kind of freshwater catfish
- Cory (company), a waste management company

== See also ==
- Cory Band, a Welsh brass band
- Coree (disambiguation)
- Corey (disambiguation)
- Cori (disambiguation)
- Corry (disambiguation)
- Corrie (disambiguation)
- Korey, given name and surname
- Kori (disambiguation)
- Kory (disambiguation)
- Kory (given name)
