= Coree (disambiguation) =

The Coree were a Native American tribe.

Coree may also refer to:

- Coree (district), Australian Capital Territory
- Coree, New South Wales, Australia

== See also ==
- Mount Coree, a mountain in Australia
- Corey
- Cori (disambiguation)
- Corie, given name
- Corrie (given name)
- Corrie (surname)
- Cory (disambiguation)
- Koree, a former Sydney Harbour ferry, Australia
- Korey, a given name and surname
- Kori (disambiguation)
- Kory (given name)
- Kory (disambiguation), includes a list of people with the surname Kory
