= Cori =

Cori or CORI may refer to:

- Cori cycle, the metabolic pathway where lactic acid produced in the muscles is converted into glucose in the liver
- Cori (lunar crater)
- Cori, a crater on Venus
- Cori (name)
- Cori, de Scheepsjongen (Cori, the Cabin Boy), a 1952–1993 Belgian comics series by Bob de Moor
- Cori, Lazio, a city in Italy
- Cori language
- Conference of Religious of Ireland
- Coordinadora Reusenca Independent
- Criminal Offender Record Information, a record of all criminal court appearances in Massachusetts
- Zyuri or Cöri, a village in Tatarstan

== See also ==
- Coris (disambiguation)
- Coree (disambiguation)
- Corie, given name
- Corrie (given name)
- Corrie (surname)
- Corry (surname)
- Cory (disambiguation)
- Korey, given name and surname
- Kori (disambiguation)
- Kory (disambiguation)
