= Corry =

Corry may refer to:

== Places ==
- Corry, County Westmeath, a townland in Rathaspick civil parish, barony of Moygoish, County Westmeath, Ireland
- Corry, County Armagh, a townland in Mullaghbrack civil parish, barony of Fews Lower, County Armagh, Northern Ireland
- Lough Corry, a lake in Ireland
- Corry, Highland, the location of a pier in Broadford, Scotland
- Corry, Missouri, United States, an unincorporated community
- Corry, Pennsylvania, United States, a city
- Corry Island, Antarctica
- Corry Massif, Antarctica
- Corry Rocks, Antarctica

== People ==
- Corry (surname)
- Corrie (given name), including people named Corry

== Other uses ==
- USS Corry, three US Navy ships
- Corry baronets, a title in the Baronetage of the United Kingdom

== See also ==
- Cory (disambiguation)
- Corey (disambiguation)
- Corrie (disambiguation)
- Curry (disambiguation)
