= Museum of Indigenous People =

Museum in Prescott, Arizona

- Location: 147 N. Arizona Avenue, Prescott, Arizona
- Coordinates: 34.5435°N 112.4590°W
- Type: Native American
- Visitors: 7,000 per year
- Director: Manuel Lucero
- President: Barbra Karkula
- Curator: Andrew Christenson
- Website: www.museumofindigenouspeople.org

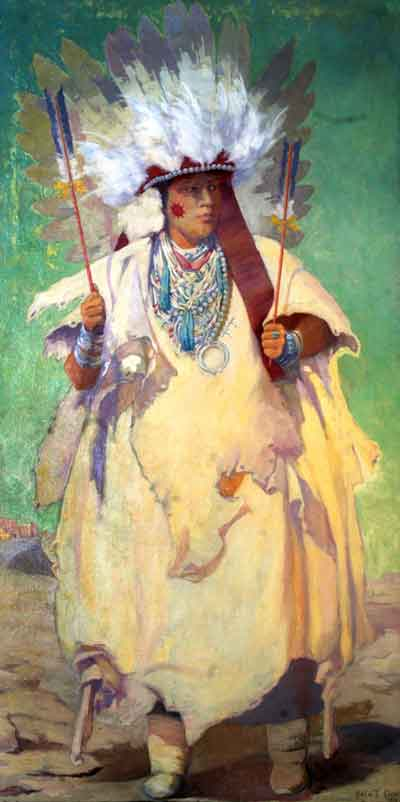
Kate Cory, Buffalo Dancer, oil, 1919, Smoki Museum, Prescott, Arizona

The Museum of Indigenous People, formerly known as the Smoki Museum of American Indian Art and Culture, is located in Prescott, Yavapai County, Arizona and holds collections of Native American artifacts.

== History ==
The museum was started, in part, due to the efforts of Kate Cory, who donated eight of her paintings and her photograph album for its collection, and Dr. Byron Cummings of the University of Arizona in order to house some of the artifacts he and his crews were excavating at the time. Sharlot Hall provided other ethnographic information. The museum evolved from events conducted by a group of white Arizona residents who enacted Native American ceremonial dances, which was not appreciated by the Hopi people. The white ceremonial enactors called themselves the "Smoki Tribe."

Beginning in 1931, Smokis met and held ceremonial presentations at a pueblo next to the current museum location. The stone and log museum building was constructed in 1935 by the Civilian Works Administration and operated as a museum. By 1990, the "Smoki Tribe" no longer performed dances due in part to pressure by Hopis to desist what were considered insulting portrayals of their sacred ceremonial practices. Instead of "Smoki Tribe" performances, the museum hosts educational programs. In 1991 the museum became a non-profit museum. It is now listed on the National Register of Historic Places

Effective Feb. 10, 2020, the museum is named the Museum of Indigenous People (MIP)

== Overview ==
Its more than 2000 artifacts include pottery, basketry, lithics and beadwork. The articles range in age dating from the Pre-Columbian era up to modern times. The baskets in the museum collection are considered among the best in the United States, and the pottery displays are impressive. Other exhibits rotate on an irregular schedule, but average 4–6 months in duration. The museum is open everyday from 10:00 a.m. until 4:00 p.m. except sunday from 1:00 a.m. until 4:00 p.m.

== See also ==
- List of museums in Arizona
