= Cory Morgan =

Cory or Corrie Morgan may refer to:

- Cory Morgan (blogger) (born 1971), Canadian blogger, columnist, and political candidate
- Cory Morgan (ice hockey) (born 1978), Canadian ice hockey player
- Corey Morgan, see Fight Night Champion
