= Corry (surname) =

Corry is a surname. Notable people with the surname include:

- Armar Lowry Corry (1793–1855), British rear admiral
- Charles Corry (born 1940), Irish cricketer
- Eoghan Corry (born 1961), Irish columnist, travel writer and author of sports history
- Isaac Corry (1753–1813), Irish and British politician and lawyer
- James Corry (disambiguation)
- Joel Corry (born 1989), British DJ, producer and television personality
- John Corry (1667–1726), Irish politician
- John Corry (writer) (fl. 1825), Irish topographer and historian
- Leo Corry (born 1956), Israeli historian
- Martin Corry (politician) (1889–1979), Irish politician
- Martin Corry (rugby union) (born 1973), English rugby player
- Maurice Corry (born 1950), Scottish politician
- Montagu Corry, 1st Baron Rowton (1838–1903), British philanthropist and public servant, longtime private secretary to Benjamin Disraeli
- Paul Corry (born 1991), Irish footballer
- Peter Corry (born 1966) Northern Irish singer
- Ron Corry (born 1941), Australian football playerand coach
- Stephen Corry (born 1951), British anthropologist
- Thomas Hughes Corry (1859–1883), British botanist
- Trevor Corry (1724–1780), Irish-born merchant and British diplomat
- William M. Corry Jr. (1889–1920), US Navy officer awarded the Medal of Honor
- William Corry (Cincinnati mayor) (1779–1833), American politician
- William Corry, 2nd Baronet (1859–1926), of the Corry baronets
- William James Corry, 4th Baronet (1924–2000), of the Corry baronets

== See also ==
- Corry (disambiguation)
- Carry (name)
