= Kate Cory =

American photographer and artist (1861–1958)

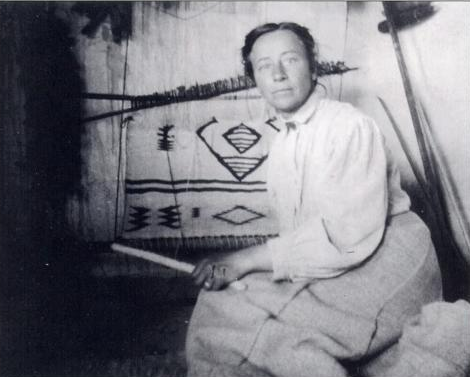
- Kate Cory in front of her loom, unknown photographer, c. 1905–1912, Sharlot Hall Museum, Prescott, Arizona
- Born: February 8, 1861; Waukegan, Illinois, US
- Died: June 12, 1958 (aged 97); Prescott, Arizona, US
- Resting place: Arizona Pioneers' Home Cemetery
- Education: Cooper Union, Art Students League of New York
- Known for: Photographer, sculptor, painter and muralist

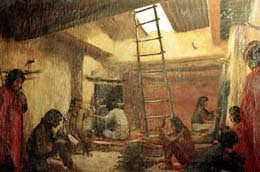
Kate T. Cory, Inside the Kiva, oil, 1905–1912, Waukegan Historical Society

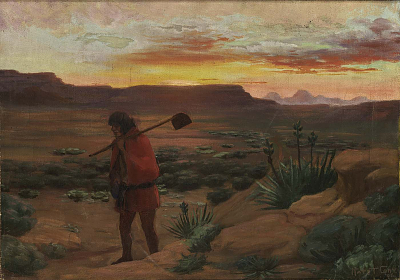
Kate T. Cory, Indian with Hoe, 1906, Smithsonian American Art Museum

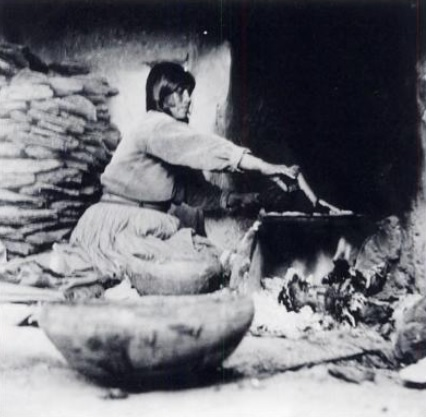
Kate T. Cory, Piki making, photograph, 1905–1912, Museum of Northern Arizona, Flagstaff. The image is representative of the personal nature of the composition – taken from the floor level, capturing light and shade and focused on everyday life.

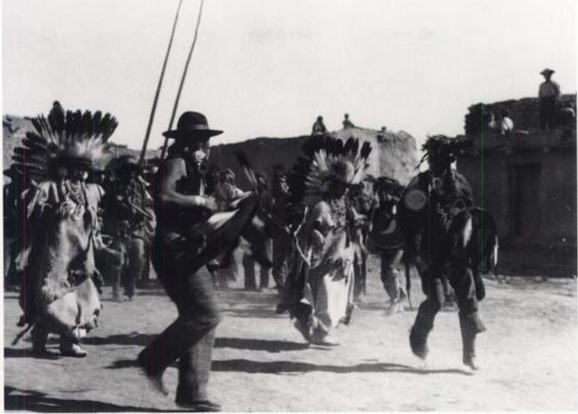
Kate T Cory, Untitled photograph of Comanche dance, 1905–1912

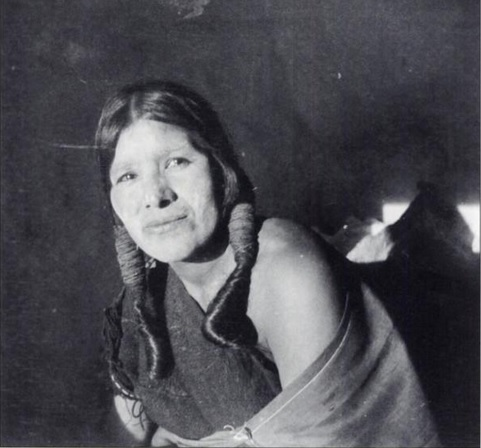
Kate T. Cory, Young married woman with corn pollen and braids, 1905–1912, Museum of Northern Arizona, Flagstaff

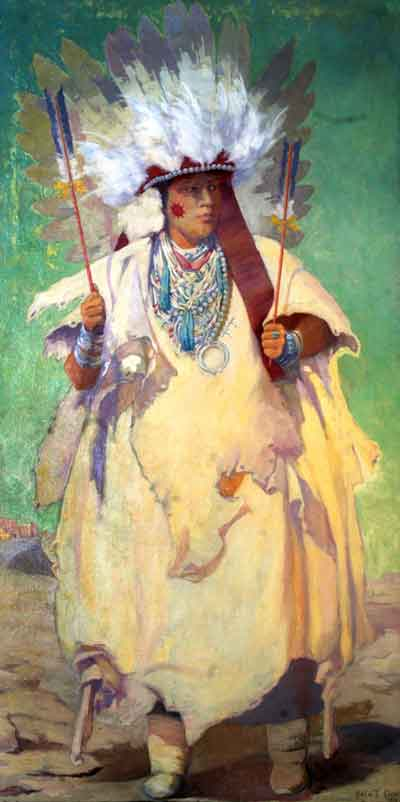
Kate T. Cory, Buffalo Dancer, oil, 1919, Smoki Museum, Prescott, Arizona

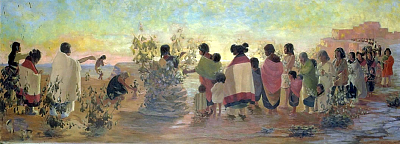
Kate T. Cory, Sun Ceremony, c. 1920, Smithsonian American Art Museum

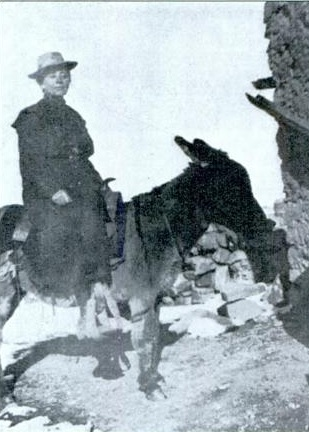
Kate Cory, at a Hopi village, c. 1905–1912

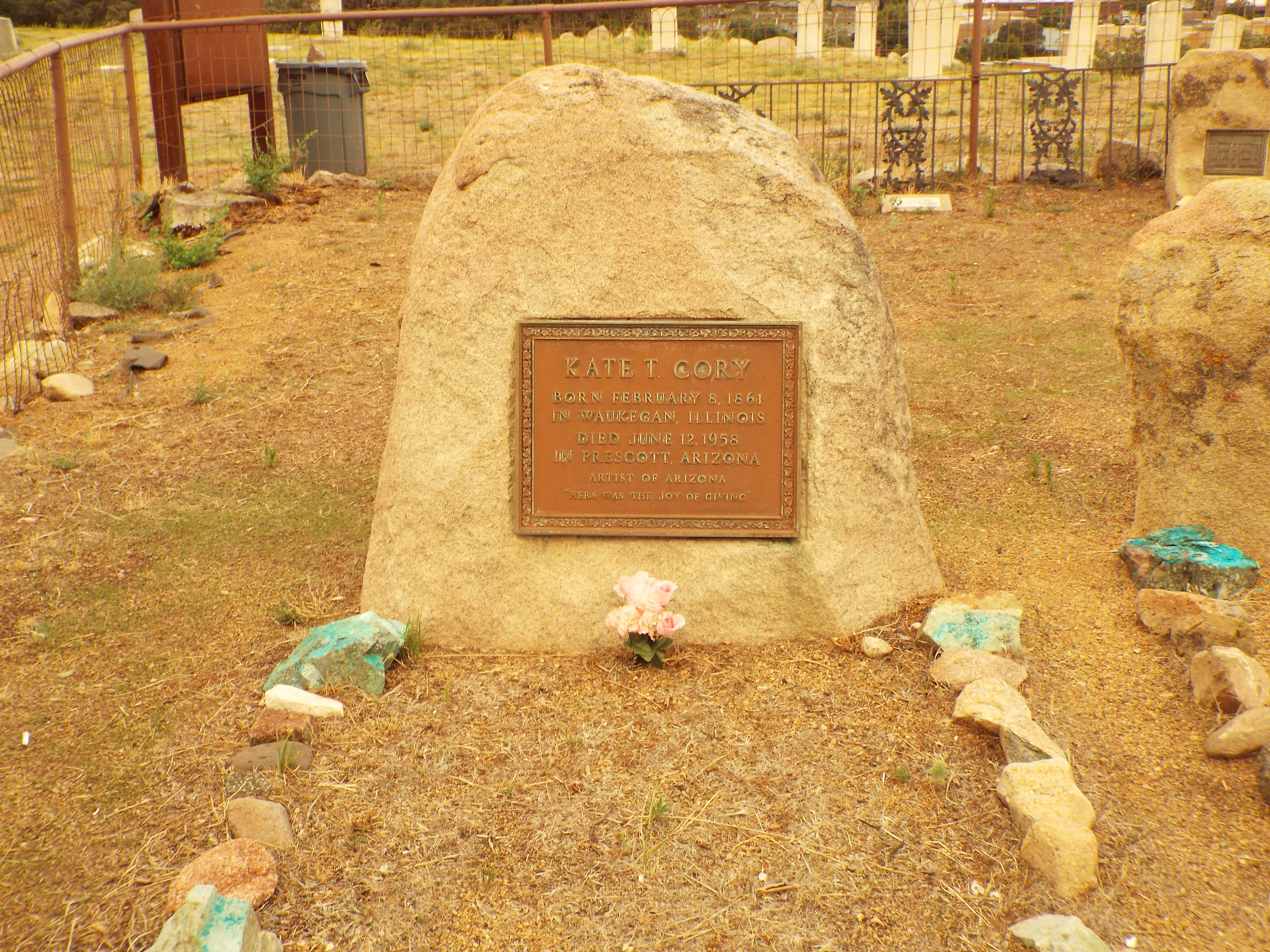
Grave-site of Kate T. Cory

Kate Cory (February 8, 1861 – June 12, 1958) was an American photographer and artist. She studied art in New York, and then worked as commercial artist. She traveled to the southwestern United States in 1905 and lived among the Hopi for several years, recording their lives in about 600 photographs.

== Early life ==
Kate Thompson Cory was born in Waukegan, Illinois, on February 8, 1861. Her parents were James Young Cory (1828–1901), born in Canada, and Eliza P. Kellogg Cory (1829–1903), born in Maine. They also had a son, named James Stewart Cory. An abolitionist, her father was involved in the Underground Railroad. Their home was fitted with a secret room in the basement of the house. From there, his free black servants brought runaway slaves to awaiting boats on Waukegan Harbour, giving the impression that they were doing business for James Cory. During the Civil War the successful newspaper editor often single-handedly ran the Waukegan Gazette after his employees had left for the war and urged him to remain in Waukegan. The Corys moved to Newark, New Jersey, in 1880 and her father, James Cory, managed his Wall Street interests in New York City.

Kate Cory was related to Fanny Cory, a book illustrator and cartoonist with works such as the Little Miss Muffet comic book.

== Career ==
=== New York ===
Cory studied oil painting and photography at Cooper Union and Art Students League of New York She was an instructor at Cooper Union.

Cory was an American photographer, painter, muralist, and sculptor. She made her living as a commercial artist, contributing drawings to Recreation magazine and was involved with New York's Pen and Brush Club.

Beginning in 1895, Cory partnered with potter Charles Volkmar to create hand-painted plaques, cups and plates of historic people, like William Penn and Alexander Hamilton. Buildings figured in the designs, such as George Washington's headquarters. The works were painted in blue, primarily by Cory. Their shop, Volkmar and Cory Pottery, was located in Corona in Queens, New York. In 1903 Volkmar opened a pottery business in Metuchen, New Jersey, called Charles Volkmar & Son.

=== Hopi villages 1905–1912 ===
At the Pen and Brush Club, Cory met artist Louis Akin, who had just returned from the Southwest. He had made paintings of the Hopi Indians to promote tourism along the Santa Fe Railroad route. Her interest in the western United States had been sparked by Ernest Seton and when Akin told her of his plans to begin an artists' colony in Northern Arizona in 1905, Cory booked passage on a train to Canyon Diablo, Arizona, and then traveled north 65 miles through the desert to the high mesa of the Hopi reservation.

She intended to visit the Hopi mesas where Akin intended to establish an artist colony for a couple of months of a tour of the western United States. When she got off the train she realized that she was the lone art colonist. Except for periods in Canada and California (1909), from 1905 to 1912 Cory lived among the Hopi at Oraibi and Walpi. In Oraibi she lived at the top of a Hopi pueblo, her space rented to her by a Hopi friend, that she accessed via stone steps and ladders. She was the only white woman brought into the secret life and practices of the Hopis. Cory learned the Hopi language, wrote about Hopi grammar, and mediated a disturbance.

While there, she painted the landscape and the Hopi people. She also took about 600 photographs, recording virtually all aspects of Hopi life, social as well as sacred. She took posed portraits, photographs of ceremonies and images of individuals, "which suggest a warm and spontaneous relationship". Her pictures depicted a traditional Hopi way of life on the precipice of having to assimilate or adapt to modern white America. Cory left the Hopi villages in 1912 and her viewpoints on life changed as a result of her relationships with the Hopi people, including eschewing modern consumerism.

...her willingness to make do with leftovers, to recycle; her disregard for material possessions; her tendency to barter rather than buy; and her limited appetite and consumption. All suggest why the pared-to-the-bones Hopi lifestyle attracted her and what she learned from her years on the mesas.

— I Became the Colony: Kate Cory's Hopi photographs

She was not the first to photograph the Hopi; however, due to her intimacy with the culture, she was able to capture a more personal view than earlier photographers. She didn't sell her photographs, but would use them as illustrations for her essays, like Life and Its Living in Hopiland – The Hopi Women, which was published in a magazine in 1909. The same year she received an Honorable Mention for a painting exhibited at the Alaska-Yukon-Pacific Exhibition in Seattle. In 1915 the Smithsonian Institution bought 25 of the paintings Cory made during the time that she lived with the Hopis.

=== Prescott ===
She moved to Prescott, Arizona, in 1913 and lived in a stone house built and furnished by Hopi workers. Cory exhibited a painting, Arizona Desert, at the Armory Show of 1913 which sold for $150, and received an honorable mention at the show.

Because of declining attendance at the Prescott Rodeo, Cory helped a group of local men calling themselves "Smoki" (pronounced Smoke-eye) with information about Hopi ceremonies that they performed. When the Smoki grew large enough to need a permanent facility and a museum, Cory assisted with the design and decoration of the buildings. She also painted her largest paintings for display in the Smoki Museum, where they still hang.

In her earnest intention to avoid living a wasteful life, she became known in Prescott for being eccentric. Fellow church members offered to replace her torn and tattered clothes. She was frugal, but gave away two cabins she owned to renters. She removed debris from rain water and used it to develop photographs. Rather than sell her paintings, she bartered them. She was described as having had "a plain, weather-beaten face, pulled-back hair, a determined black-clothed walk with a cane, as if every trip downtown were aimed at confronting the mayor."

Her paintings are in the collections of the Smithsonian American Art Museum, Sharlot Hall Museum, and the Smoki Museum of American Indian Art and Culture in Prescott. Her work is also owned by the First Congregationalist Church, where Cory was a member.

== Death ==
She died in Prescott on June 12, 1958, at the Arizona Pioneers' Home and was buried at the Pioneers' Home Cemetery near her friend Sharlot Hall. The inscription at her gravesite names her "Artist of Arizona" below which is: "Hers Was The Joy of Giving".

== Legacy ==
The negatives for the photographs that Cory took between 1905 and 1912 were found in the 1980s in a cardboard box along with other materials donated to the Smoki Museum. Not knowing how to preserve the negatives, the museum gave them to the Museum of Northern Arizona, who was better equipped to maintain and preserve the images. Marc Gaede, director of photography at the museum, Marnie Gaede and Barton Wright created the book The Hopi Photographs: Kate Cory: 1905–1912 based on some of the found images, some of which are ceremonial scenes. Due to concern from the Hopis about the rights to their cultural property, many images will not be published by the museum and are available in a restricted file for viewing by researchers.

...although Cory is still as interested in her image's composition – its lines and textures, lights and darks – as in its subject, this shot of a man intent on spinning wool is not a familiar or predictable image. Perhaps the man's position straddling shade and sun reflects the worlds he also straddles, which are visually conveyed in his cropped hair and Anglo clothes and in his skill at spinning wool, its presence in the Southwest the result of encounters between the Spanish and Native peoples.

— : I Became the Colony – Kate Cory's Hopi photographs

The Smoki Museum in Prescott, Arizona, has the largest collection of Cory artwork on display.

Her papers are held by the Sharlot Hall Museum.

== Works ==
=== Books ===
- Kate Cory; A Legend of Thumb Butte.
- Kate Cory; Marc Gaede, Marnie Gaede, Barton Wright. The Hopi photographs: Kate Cory, 1905–1912. University of New Mexico Press; 1986. ISBN 978-0-8263-1058-3.

=== Paintings ===
- A Study of Kachinas for Children, watercolor, Smoki Museum, Prescott, Arizona
- Blonde Woman, oil, c. 1935, Sharlot Hall Museum, Prescott, Arizona
- Bouquet of Two Red Poppies, watercolor, c. 1935, Sharlot Hall Museum, Prescott, Arizona
- Brown Haired Woman, oil, 1935, Sharlot Hall Museum, Prescott, Arizona
- Butterfly Maiden, oil, Smoki Museum, Prescott, Arizona
- Buffalo Dancer, oil, 1919, Smoki Museum, Prescott, Arizona
- Colorado River, oil, 1929, Sharlot Hall Museum, Prescott, Arizona
- Desert Valley Landscape, oil, c. 1935, Sharlot Hall Museum, Prescott, Arizona
- Eliza P. Cory (artists' mother), watercolor, Smoki Museum, Prescott, Arizona
- Feather Ceremony at Sunrise, oil, c. 1950, Prescott Public Library, Arizona
- Five Indian Women with Baskets and Cooking Fire, oil, c. 1935, Sharlot Hall Museum, Prescott, Arizona
- Hopi Butterfly, oil, Smoki Museum, Prescott, Arizona
- Hopi Butterfly (2), oil, Smoki Museum, Prescott, Arizona
- Hopi Girl, oil, c. 1935, Sharlot Hall Museum, Prescott, Arizona
- Hopi Indian Maiden, oil, private collection
- Indian Maiden, oil, before 1916, Atchison, Topeka and Santa Fe Railway, Chicago, Illinois
- Indian with Hoe, oil, 1906, Smithsonian American Art Museum
- Inside the Kiva, oil, 1905–1912, Waukegan Historical Society, Illinois
- Local Wild Flowers, Granite Mountains in the background, oil, 1937, Federal Art Project, Sharlot Hall Museum, Prescott, Arizona
- Local Wild Flowers with rocky hills in the distance, oil, 1937, Federal Art Project, Sharlot Hall Museum, Prescott, Arizona
- Man, Full Length, oil, Smithsonian American Art Museum
- Mana with Ceremonial Robe (Portrait of Hopi Indian Woman), oil, 1909, Waukegan Historical Society, Illinois
- Mata Dexter (portrait), oil, Smoki Museum, Prescott, Arizona
- Mesa with Indian Village in Distance, oil, Smithsonian American Art Museum
- Migration of the Hopi Tribe in the Early 20th Century, oil, 1939, First Congregational Church, Prescott, Arizona (on permanent loan to the Smoki Museum)
- Moonlight Frolic, oil, before 1914, Atchison, Topeka and Santa Fe Railway, Chicago, Illinois
- Mother and Child, oil, Smithsonian American Art Museum
- Mountain Landscape, oil, 1937, Sharlot Hall Museum, Prescott, Arizona
- Native American Carding Wool, oil, Prescott Public Library, Arizona
- Navajo Brush Shelter, oil, c. 1930, Sharlot Hall Museum, Prescott, Arizona
- Old Man, oil, c. 1935, Sharlot Hall Museum, Prescott, Arizona
- Prescott, Arizona, oil, private collection
- Pueblo of Walpi, oil, before 1916, Atchison, Topeka and Santa Fe Railway, Chicago, Illinois
- Return of the Kachinas, oil, Smoki Museum, Prescott, Arizona
- Sun Ceremony, oil, Smithsonian American Art Museum
- Sunset or Sunrise over Mountain Valley, oil on Masonite, c. 1935, Sharlot Hall Museum, Prescott, Arizona
- TAWEA, oil, c. 1935, Sharlot Hall Museum, Prescott, Arizona
- The Baker, oil, Smoki Museum, Prescott, Arizona
- The Kachina, oil, Smithsonian American Art Museum
- The Migration, oil, Smoki Museum, Prescott, Arizona
- The Snake Myth, oil, Smoki Museum, Prescott, Arizona
- The Weaver, oil, 1900–1905, Waukegan Historical Society, Illinois
- Thumb Butte, oil (15.5x18), Private Collection, Prescott, Arizona
- US Army Biplane Flying across the Hills, oil, c. 1935, Sharlot Hall Museum, Prescott, Arizona
- Woman Nursing a Baby, oil, c. 1935, Sharlot Hall Museum, Prescott, Arizona
- Wu Wu Ceremony, oil, Smoki Museum, Prescott, Arizona

=== Photographs ===
A few of the photographs taken of the Hopi between 1905 and 1912:

- Corn crop covers the roof
- Hopi maiden
- Hopi man
- Hopi school girls in cauldron
- Hopi spinner
- Hopi water carrier
- Hopi weaver
- Hopi woman in traditional dress
- Landlady putting bread in oven
- Navajo Woman at New Oraibi
- Old Oraibi
- Piki making
- Pottery firing
- Young Hopi woman having her hair dressed
- Young married woman with corn pollen and braid
