= Coris =

Coris may refer to:

- Coris (fish), a fish genus in the family Labridae
- Coris (plant), a plant genus in the family Primulaceae
- Coris District, a district of the Ancash Region in Peru
- San Pedro de Coris District, a district of the Huancavelica Region in Peru

== See also ==
- Cori (disambiguation)
- Corris
