= Kory =

Kory may refer to:

- Kory (given name)
- Kaye Kory (born 1947), American politician
- Pierre Kory, American critical care physician
- KORY-CD, a television channel in Eugene, Oregon, U.S.

== See also ==
- Korey, given name and surname
- Kori (disambiguation)
- Korie, given name and surname
- Cori (disambiguation)
- Cory (disambiguation)
