= Corry Rocks =

The Corry Rocks (70°20′S 71°41′E) are a cluster of rocks at the northern extremity of Gillock Island, in the Amery Ice Shelf. One of these rocks was occupied as an Australian National Antarctic Research Expeditions survey station in 1968. The group was named by the Antarctic Names Committee of Australia for M.J. Corry, leader and glaciologist of the Amery Ice Shelf party in 1968, who took part in the survey.
