= Sharlot Hall Museum =

Historic house in Arizona, United States

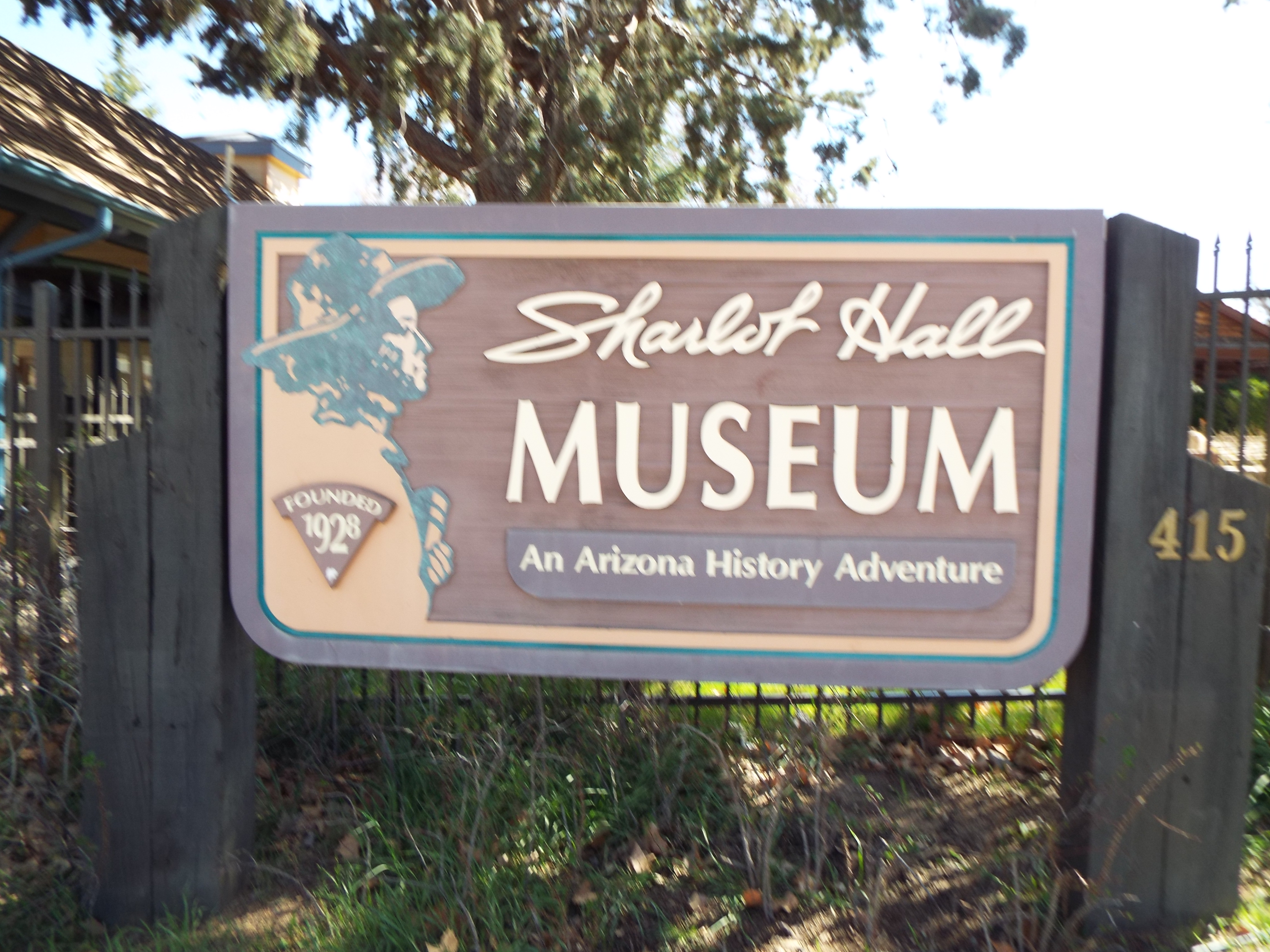
- Established: 1928
- Location: Prescott, Arizona
- Coordinates: 34°32′30″N 112°28′25″W
- Type: Living history
- Director: Paul Fees (Interim)

- Old Governor's Mansion
- U.S. National Register of Historic Places
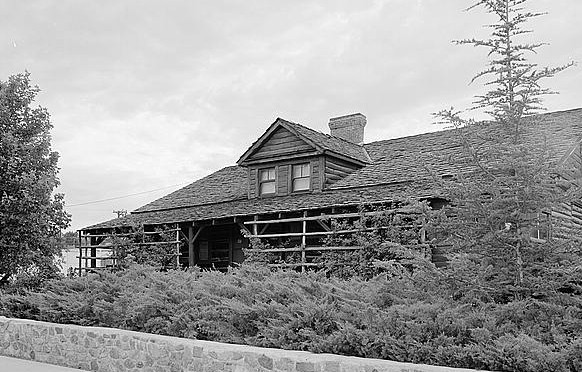

- Location within Arizona Location within the United States
- Location: 400 block of W. Gurley, Prescott, Arizona
- Coordinates: 34°32′29″N 112°28′23″W
- Area: 1.5 acres (0.61 ha).
- Built: 1864
- NRHP reference No.: 71000121
- Added to NRHP: September 10, 1971

The Sharlot Hall Museum is an open-air museum and heritage site located in Prescott, Arizona. Opened in 1928 by Sharlot M. Hall as the Gubernatorial Mansion Museum, the museum that now bears her name is dedicated to preserving the history and culture of the Central Highlands of Arizona.

== Overview ==
The museum grounds comprises almost four acres and includes 11 exhibit buildings, six of which are historic. This includes the Governor's Mansion built at its site in 1864 and listed in the National Register of Historic Places (NRHP). Several historic buildings and structures were moved to the property, and include:

- Fort Misery (the oldest log cabin in Arizona, built in 1864, moved to this property in 1934),
- Frémont House (built in 1875, home of 5th Territorial governor John C. Frémont, moved to the museum in 1971),
- Bashford House (built in 1877 and was the Victorian home of businessman William Bashford).

Additional historic buildings built on-site include the Sharlot Hall Building (stone exhibit building built during the Depression as a CWA project) and the nearby Ranch House.

Additional exhibit buildings include the Lawler Exhibit Center, built in the 1970s which houses the museum's pre-history exhibit; the Transportation Building, built in 1937 and houses the museum's rolling stock; and the School House, built as a replica to the first school house built in Prescott in 1868.

Sharlot Hall Museum also has a Library and Archives, located across the street at 115 S. McCormick Street. It provides full-service research opportunities through its vast collections of rare books and special holdings of original documents, photographs, maps, and oral histories.

The museum honors more than 500 women in their Territorial Women's Memorial Rose Garden. The following women are among the most notable individuals associated with the Rose Garden:

- Mary (Margaret Ann) Ainsworth
- Kate Cory
- Jessie Benton Frémont
- Sharlot Hall
- Edith Alice Macia
- Ethel Robertson Macia
- Frances Munds
- Pauline O'Neill
- Sedona Schnebly

== History ==
=== Old Governor's Mansion ===
The Old Governor's Mansion was built in 1864 and was listed on the National Register of Historic Places in 1971.

It was built at a cost of $6,000 by contractors were Blair, Hatz, and Raible, who reportedly underestimated the cost of transporting building materials and lost $1,500 on the contract.

In front of the mansion are roses, of French "Boursault" type, descended from 1865 planting by Margaret McCormick, wife of the 2nd governor of the Arizona Territory (see photo including informational plaque).

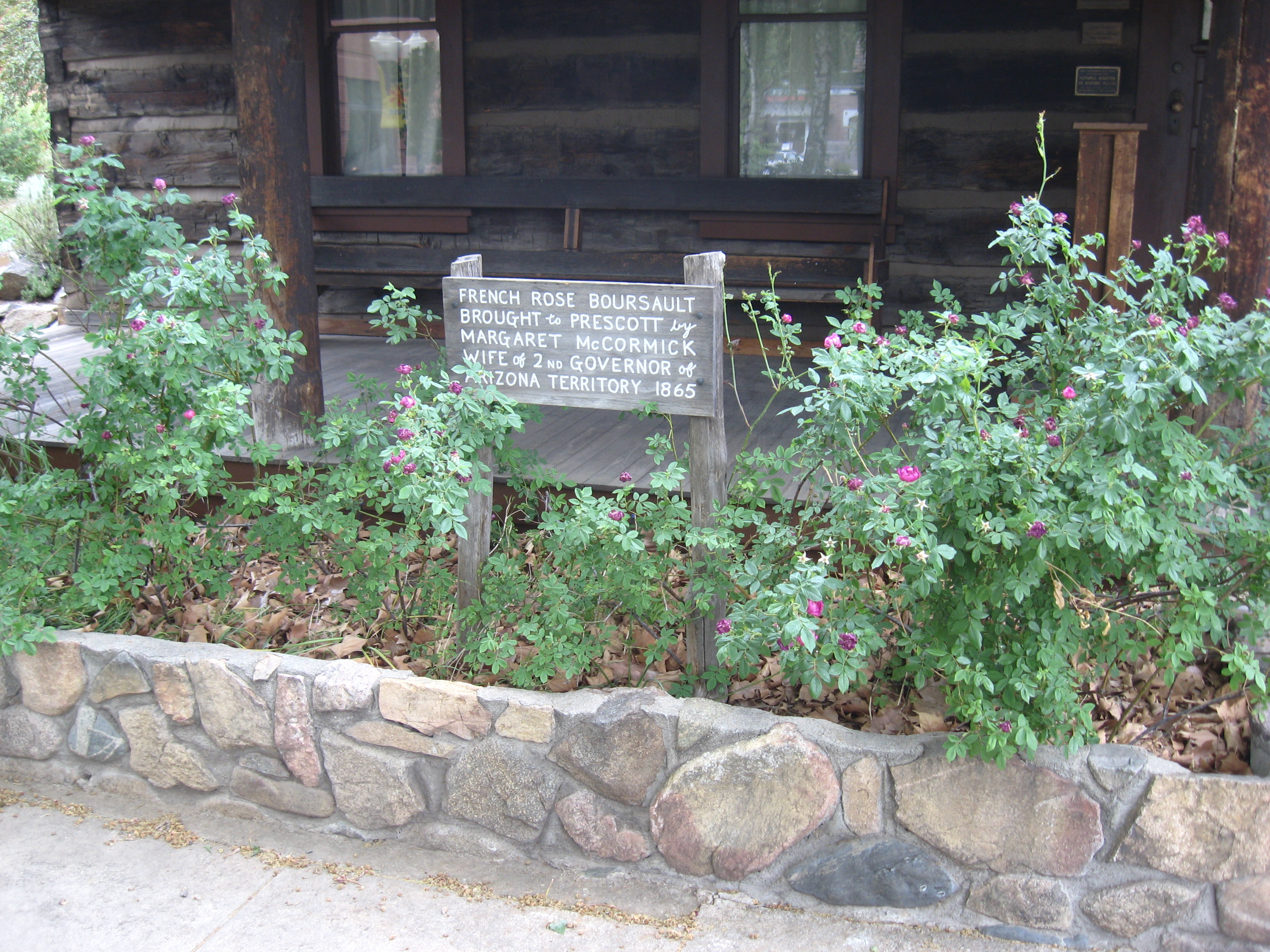
Descendants of Margaret McCormick's roses

== Images ==
Images of some historic structures and exhibits in the Sharlot Hall Museum:

Sharlot Hall Museum

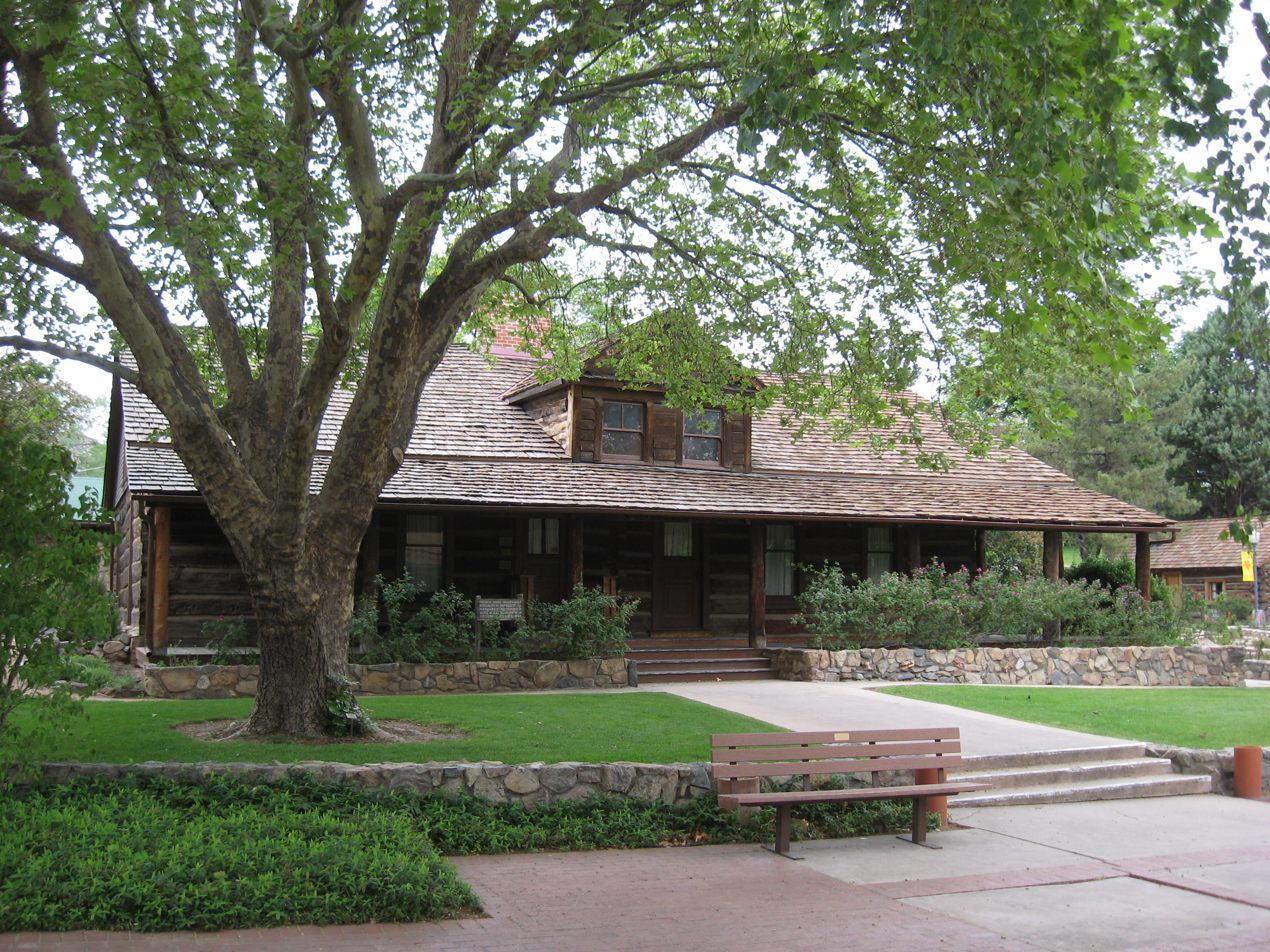
Old Governor's Mansion on the museum grounds

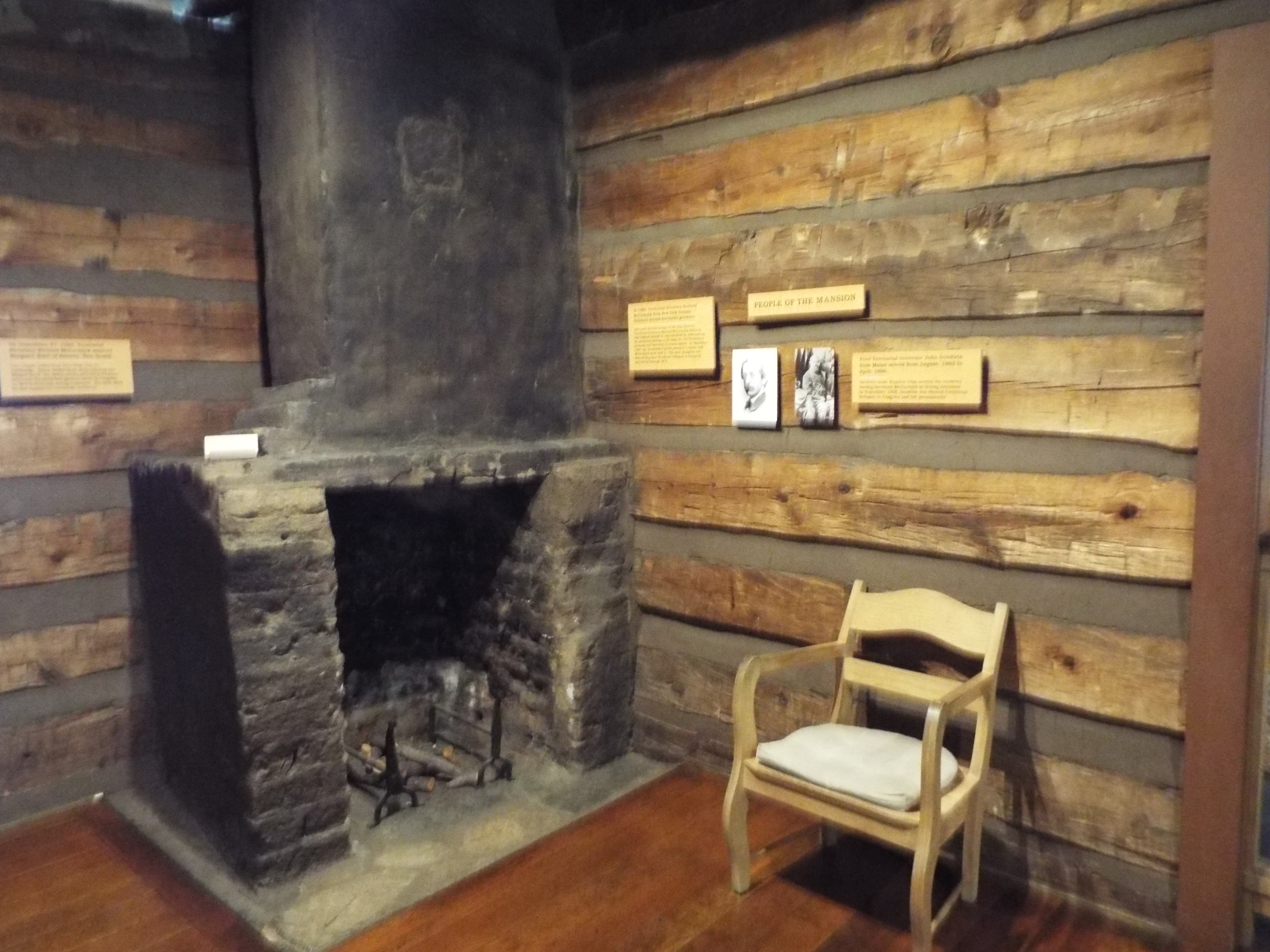
Inside the "Old Governor's Mansion"

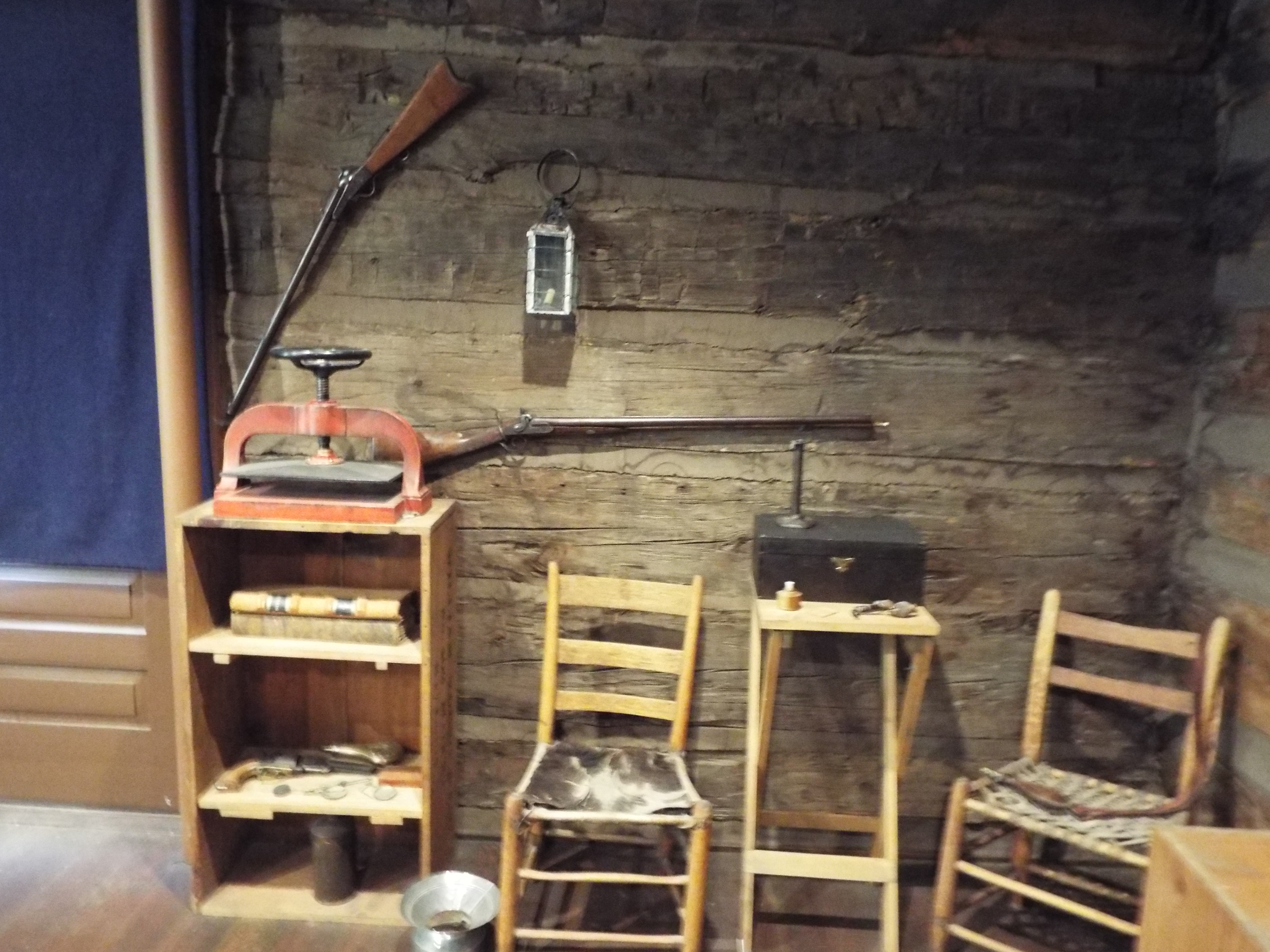
Inside another room of the "Old Governor's Mansion"

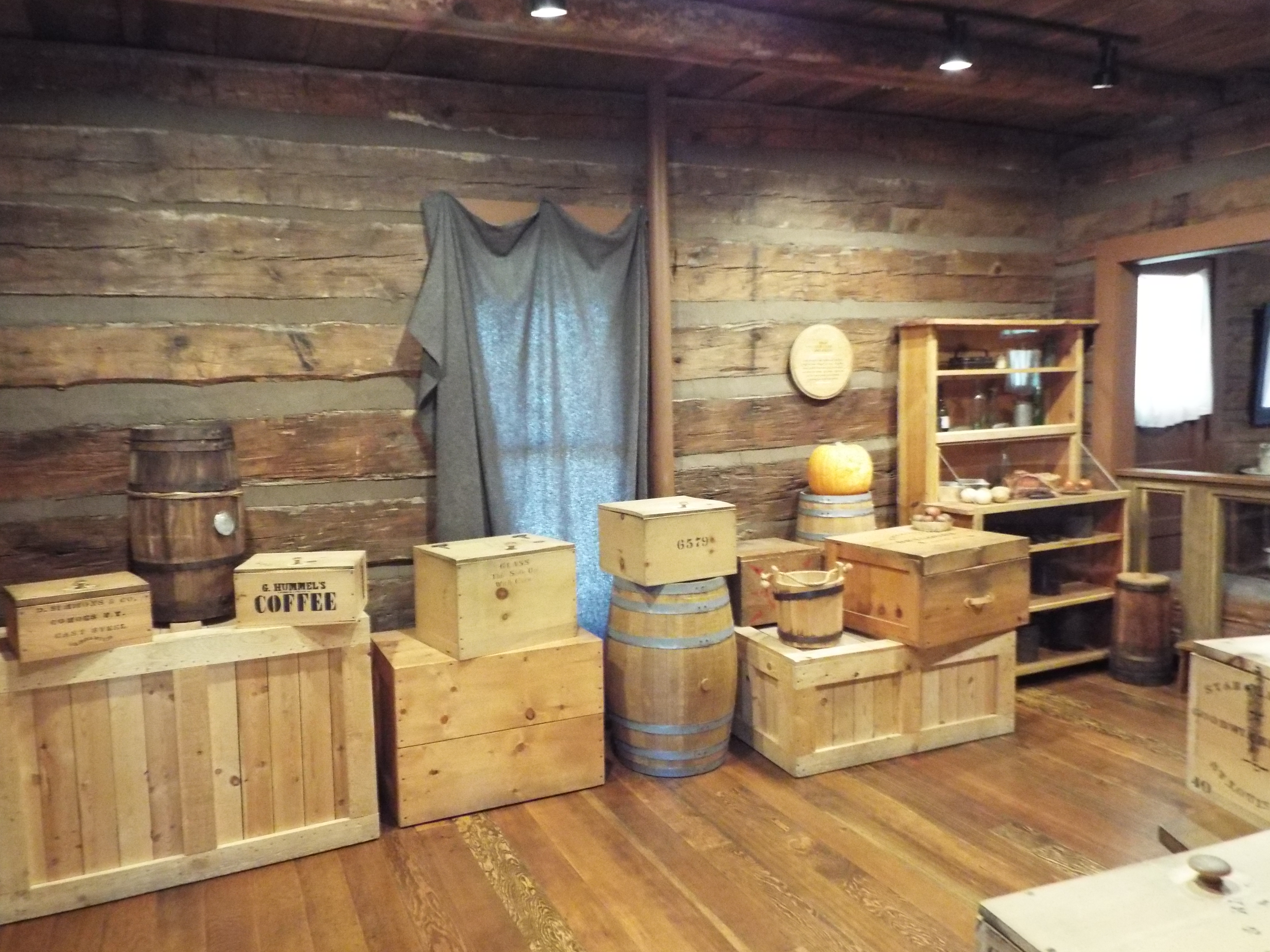
Inside the "Old Governor's Mansion"

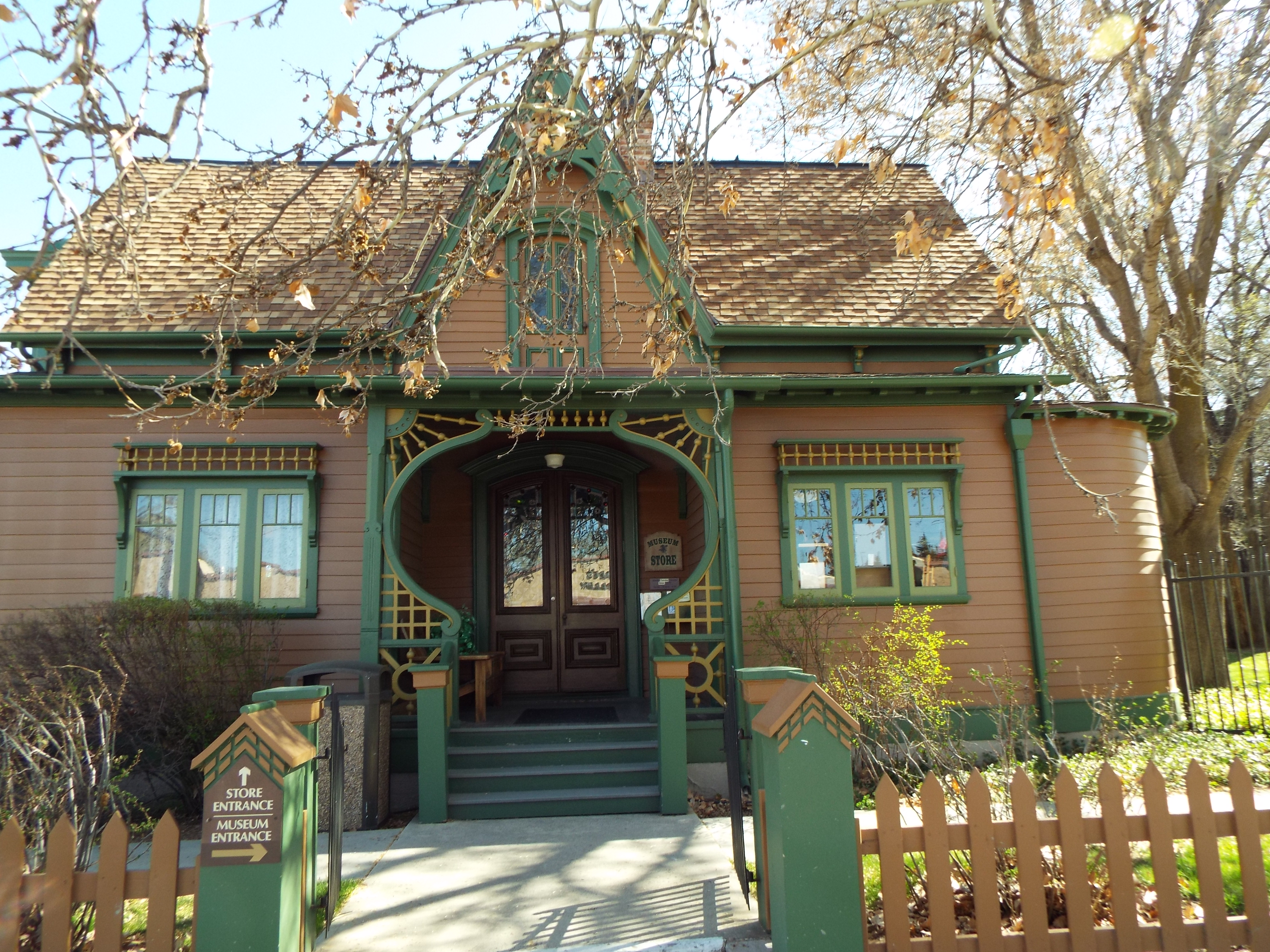
The William C. Bashford House

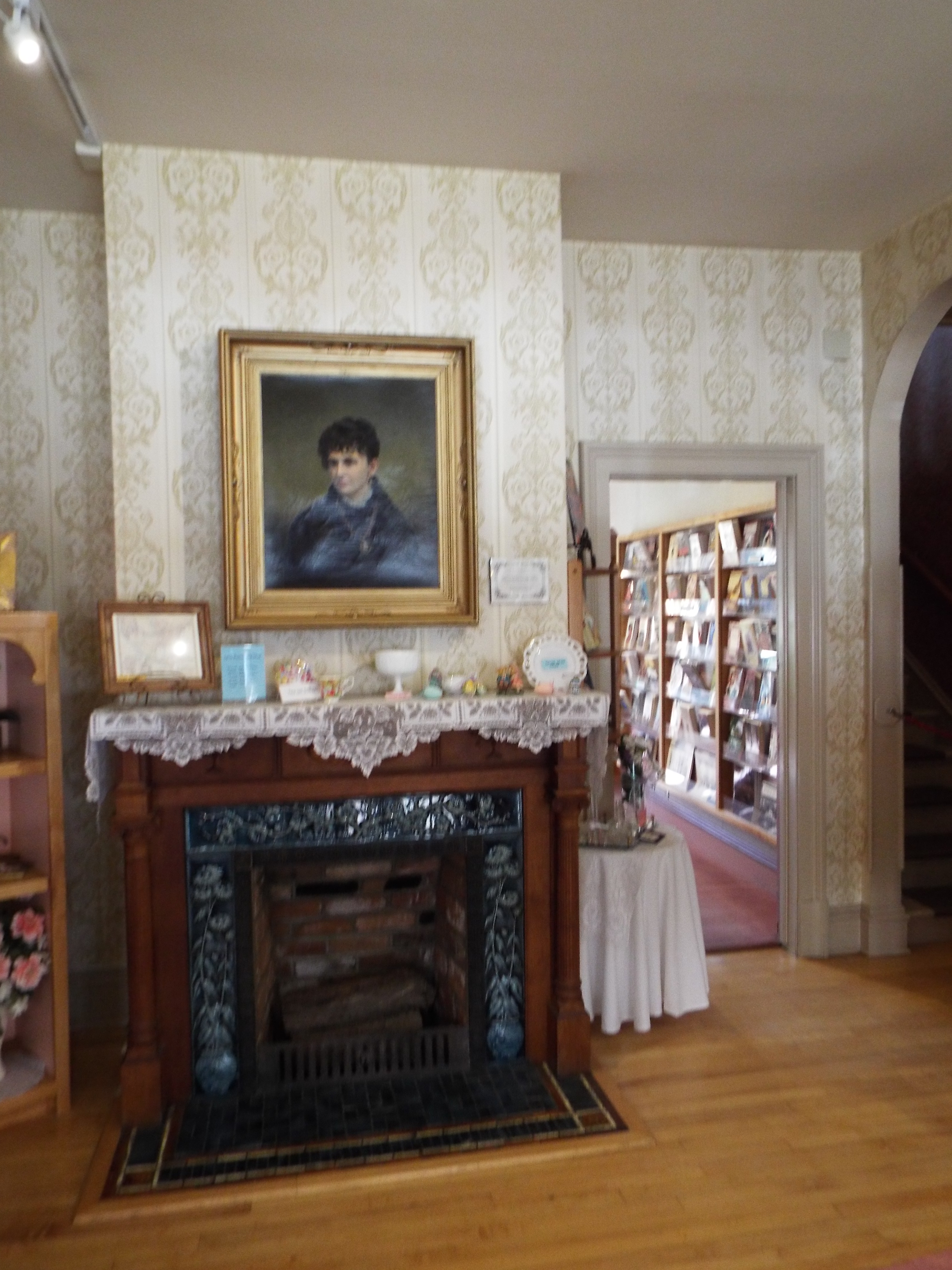
Inside the Bashford House

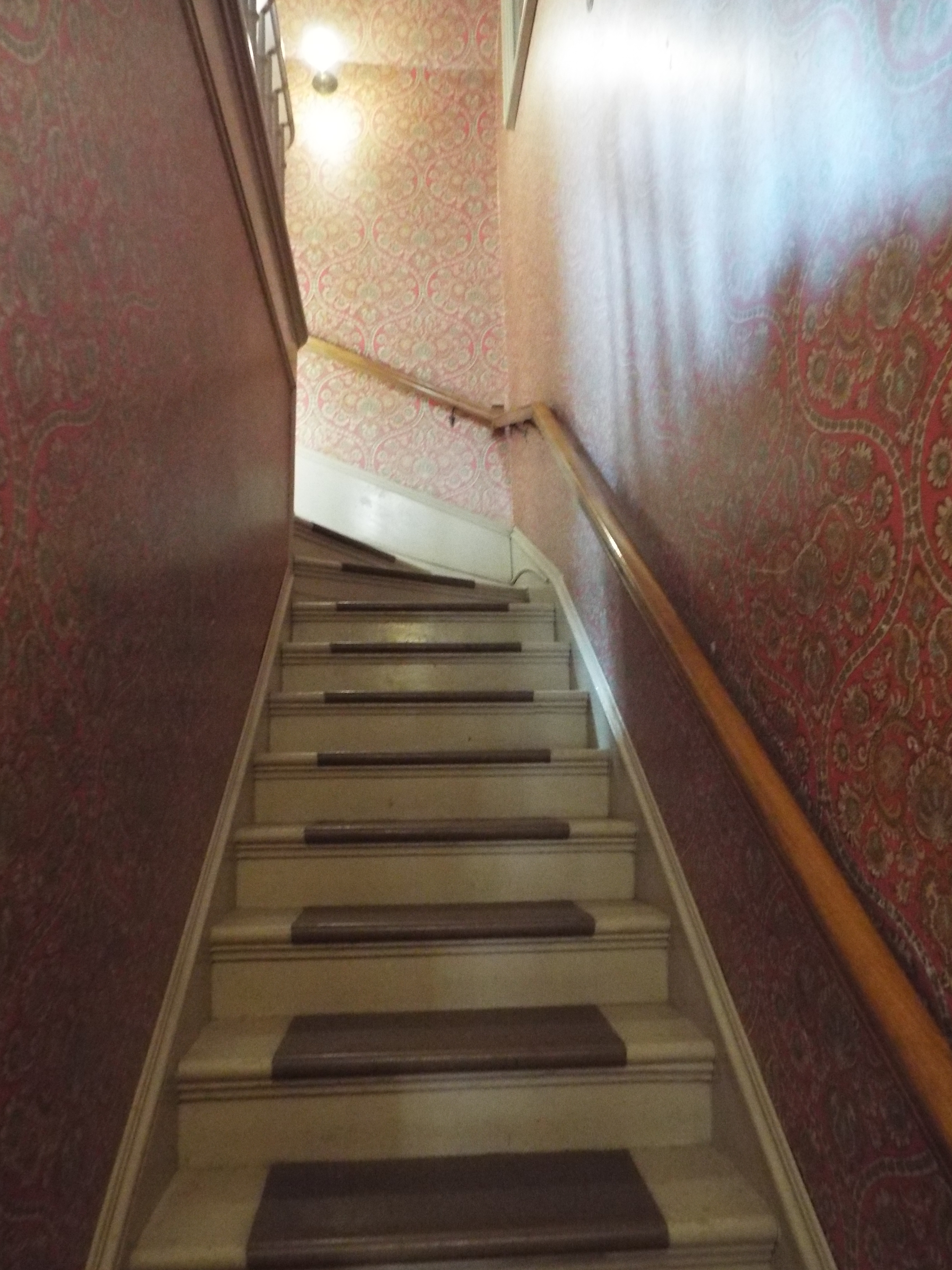
The Bashford House staircase.

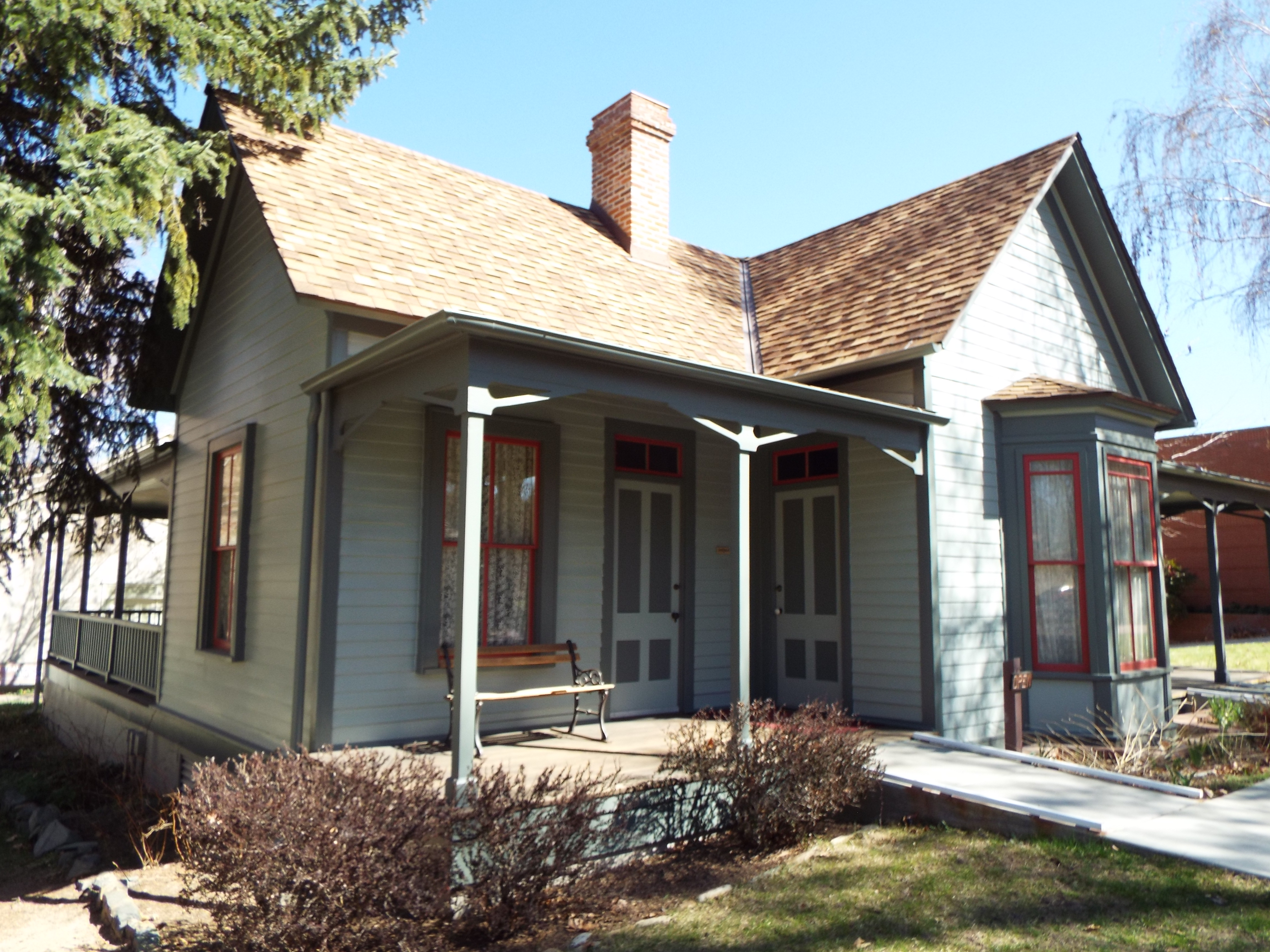
The John Charles Frémont House

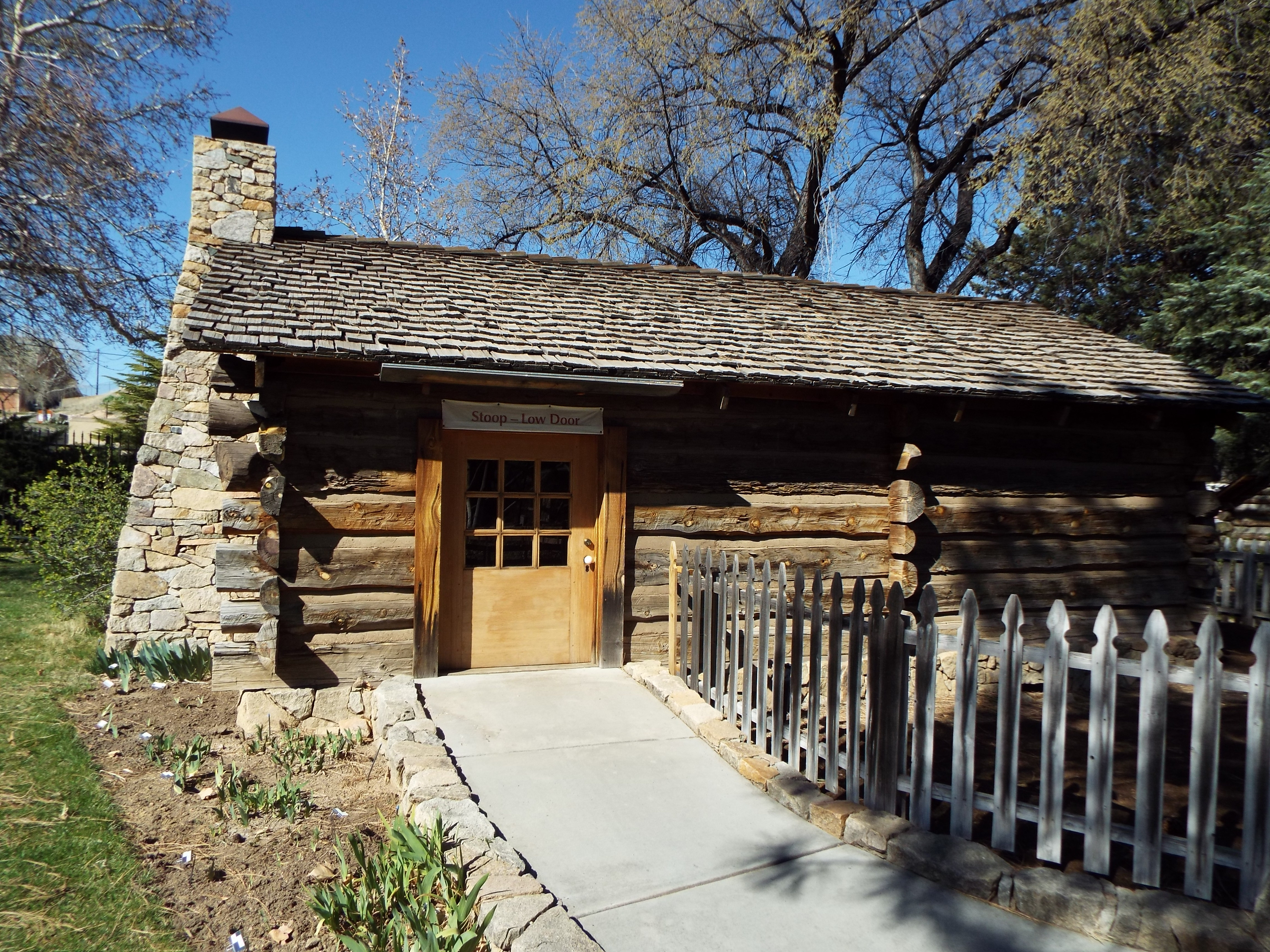
Fort Misery Log Cabin

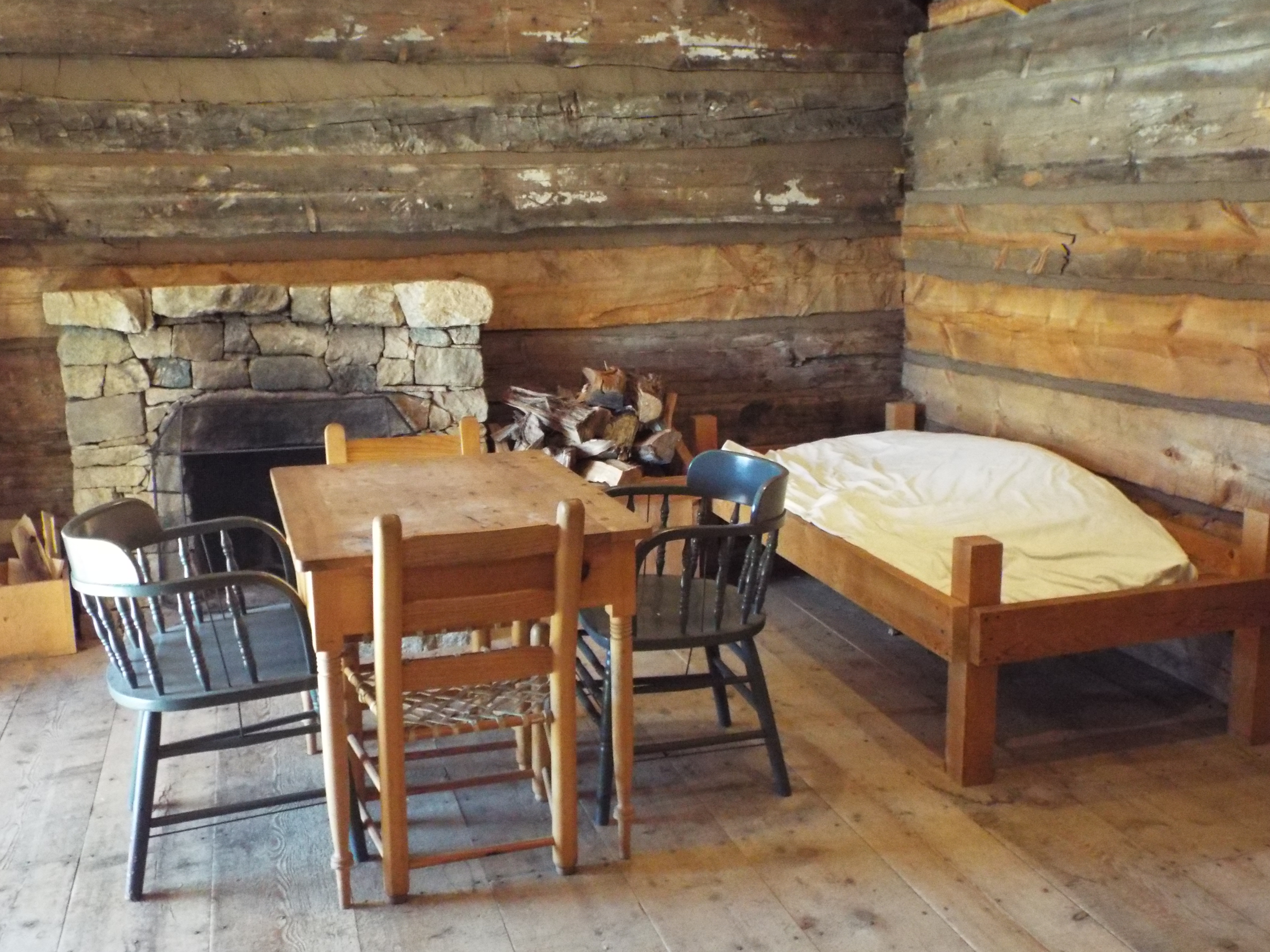
Inside the Fort Misery Log Cabin

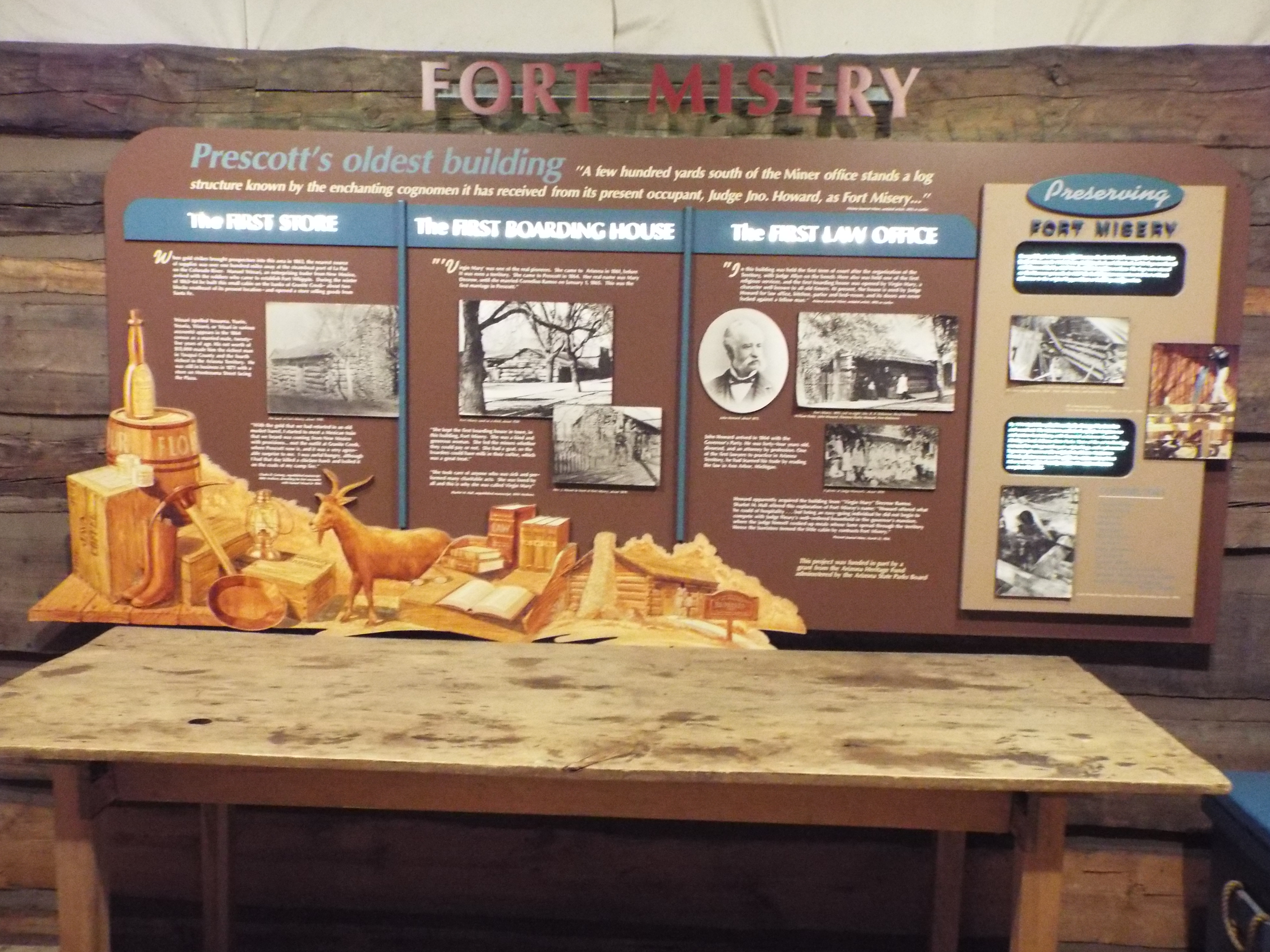
Different room in the Fort Misery Log Cabin

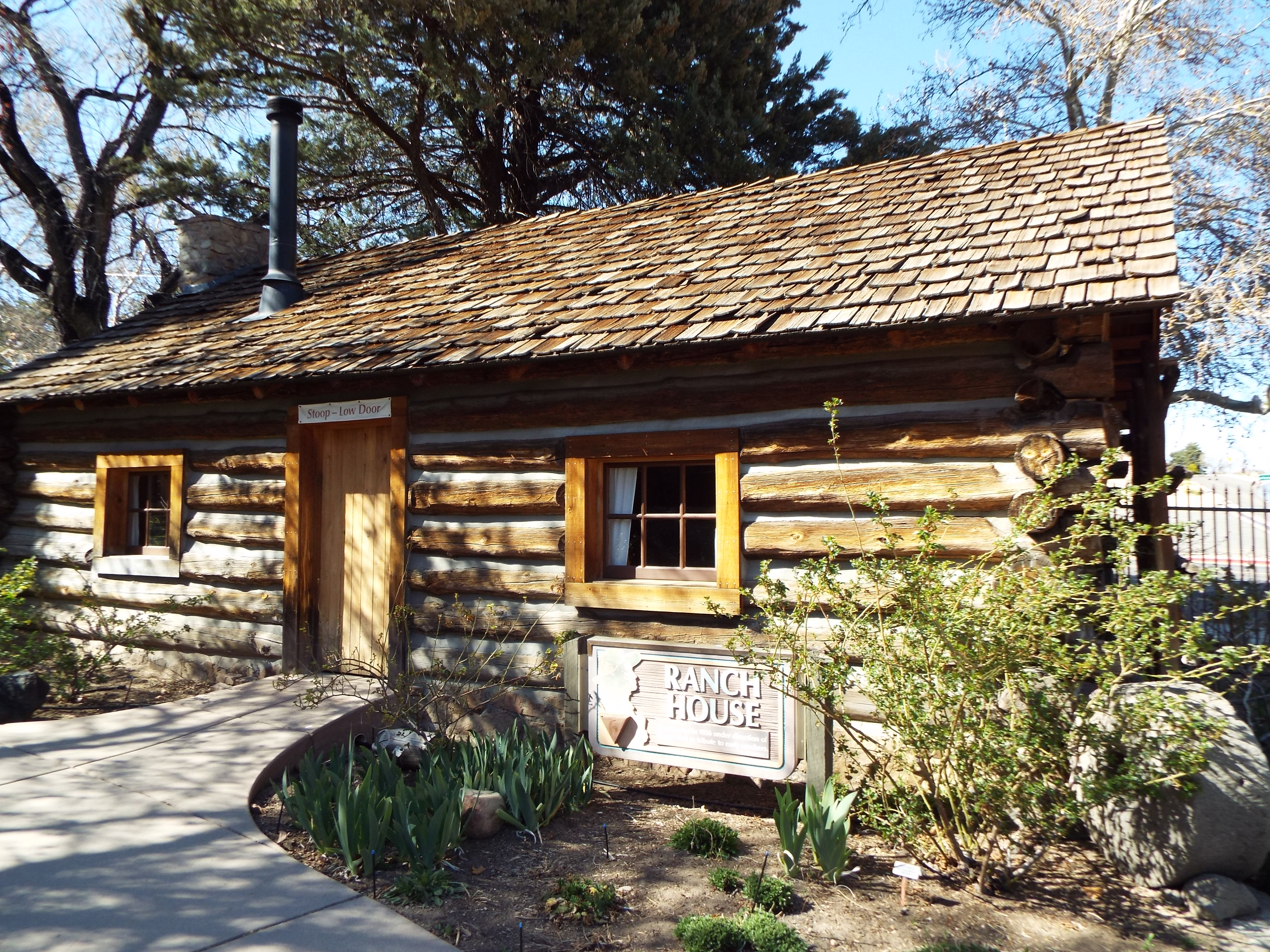
The Ranch House

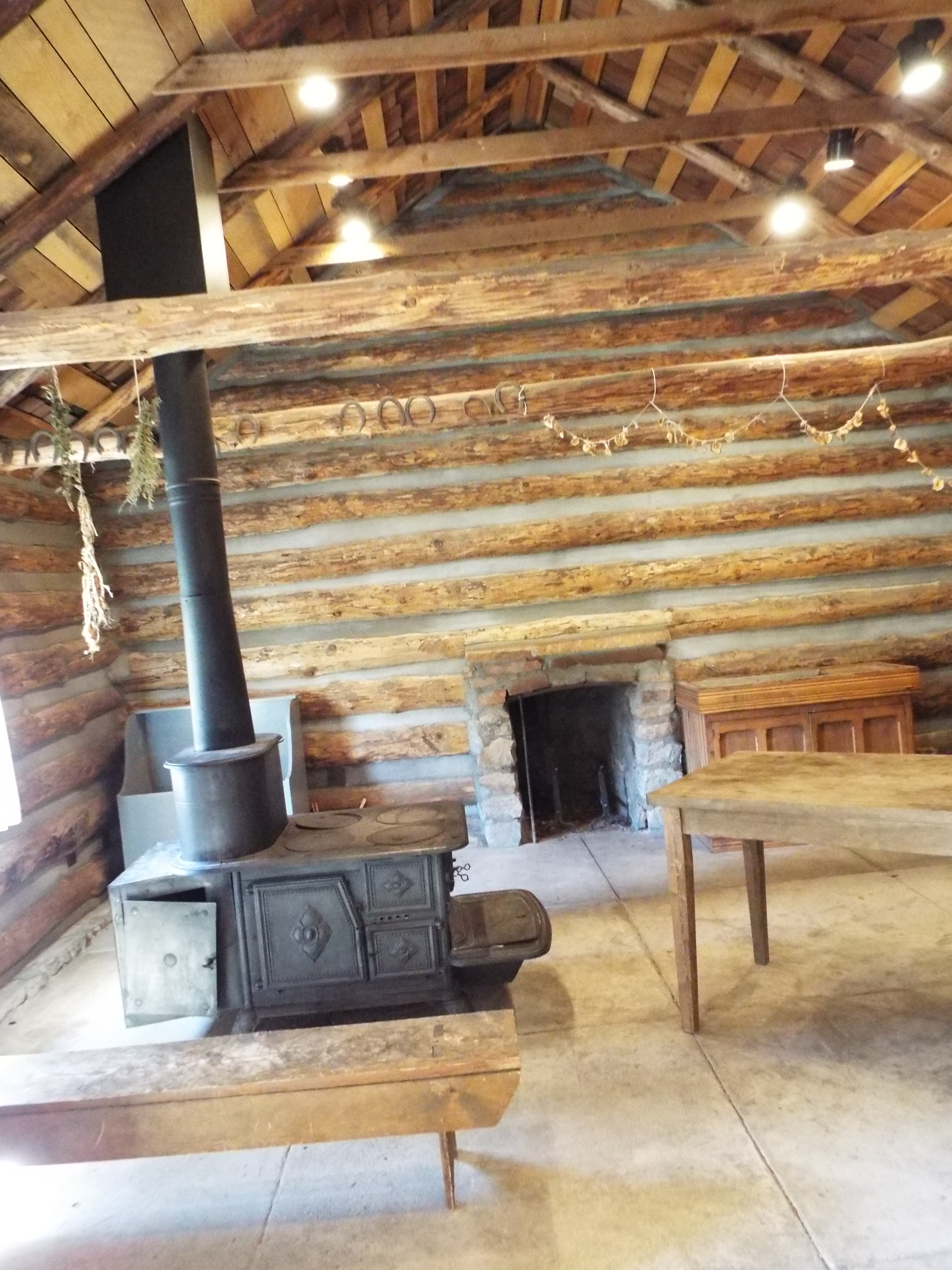
Inside the Ranch House

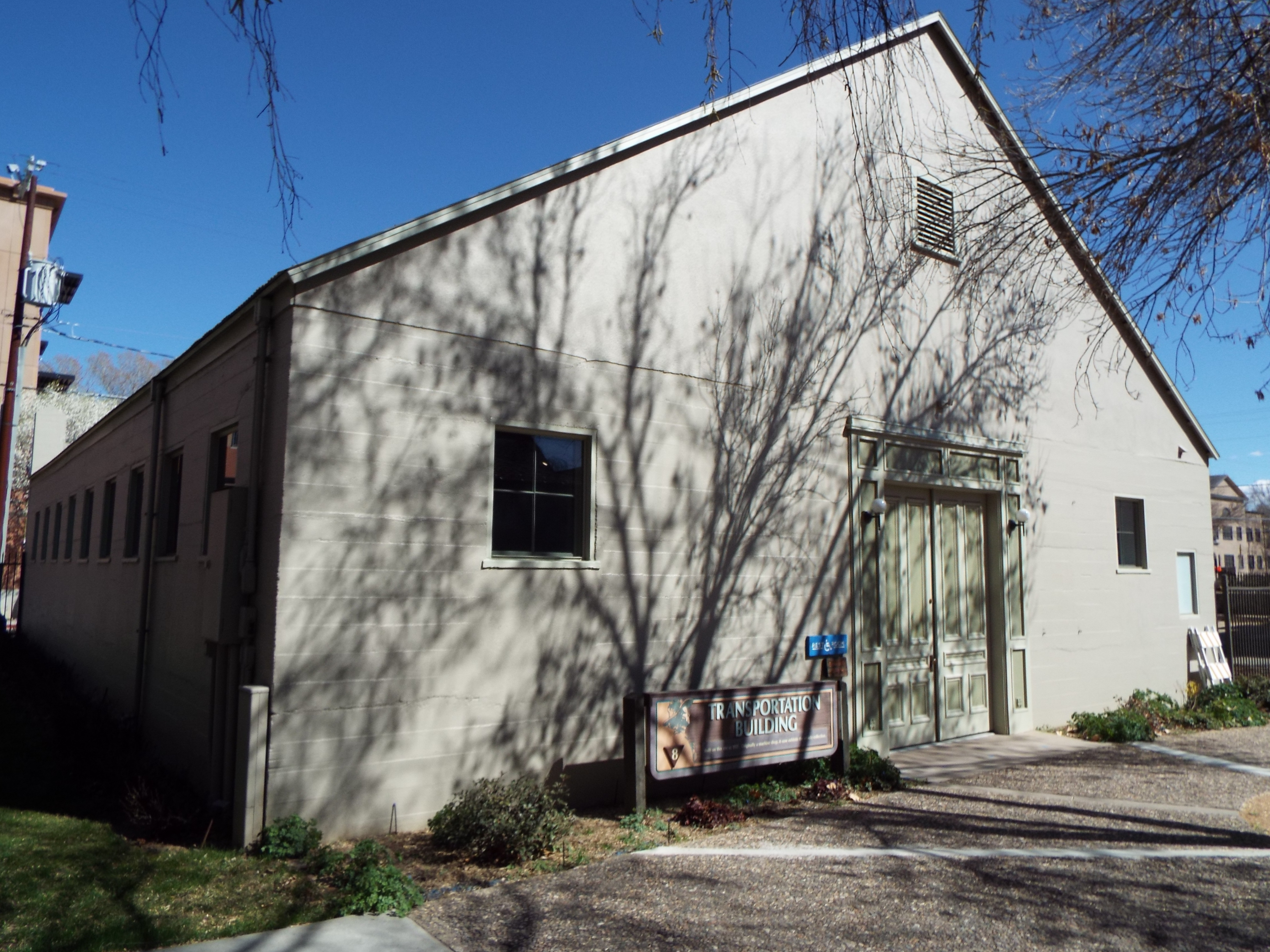
The Transportation Building

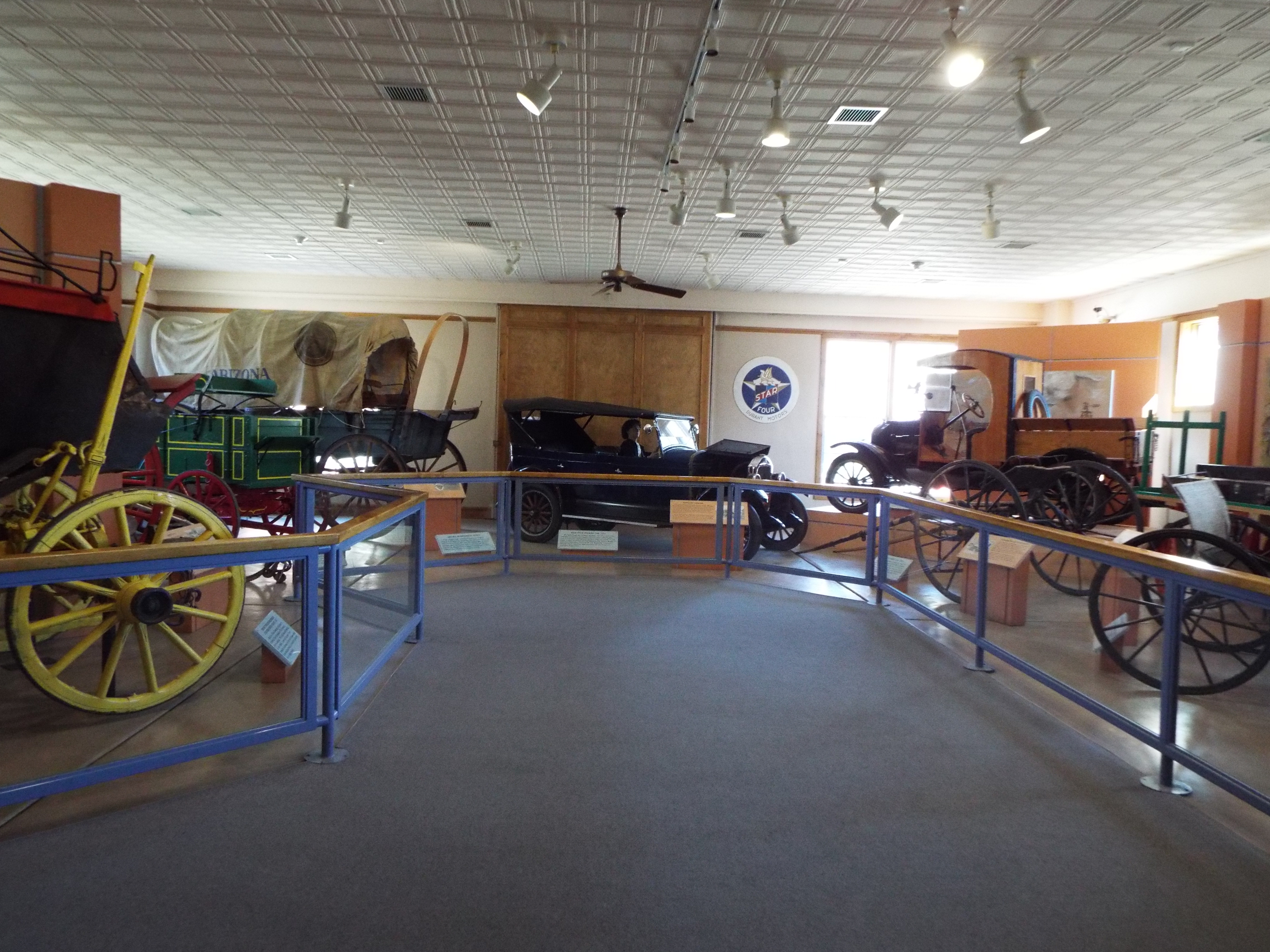
Exhibits inside the Transportation Building

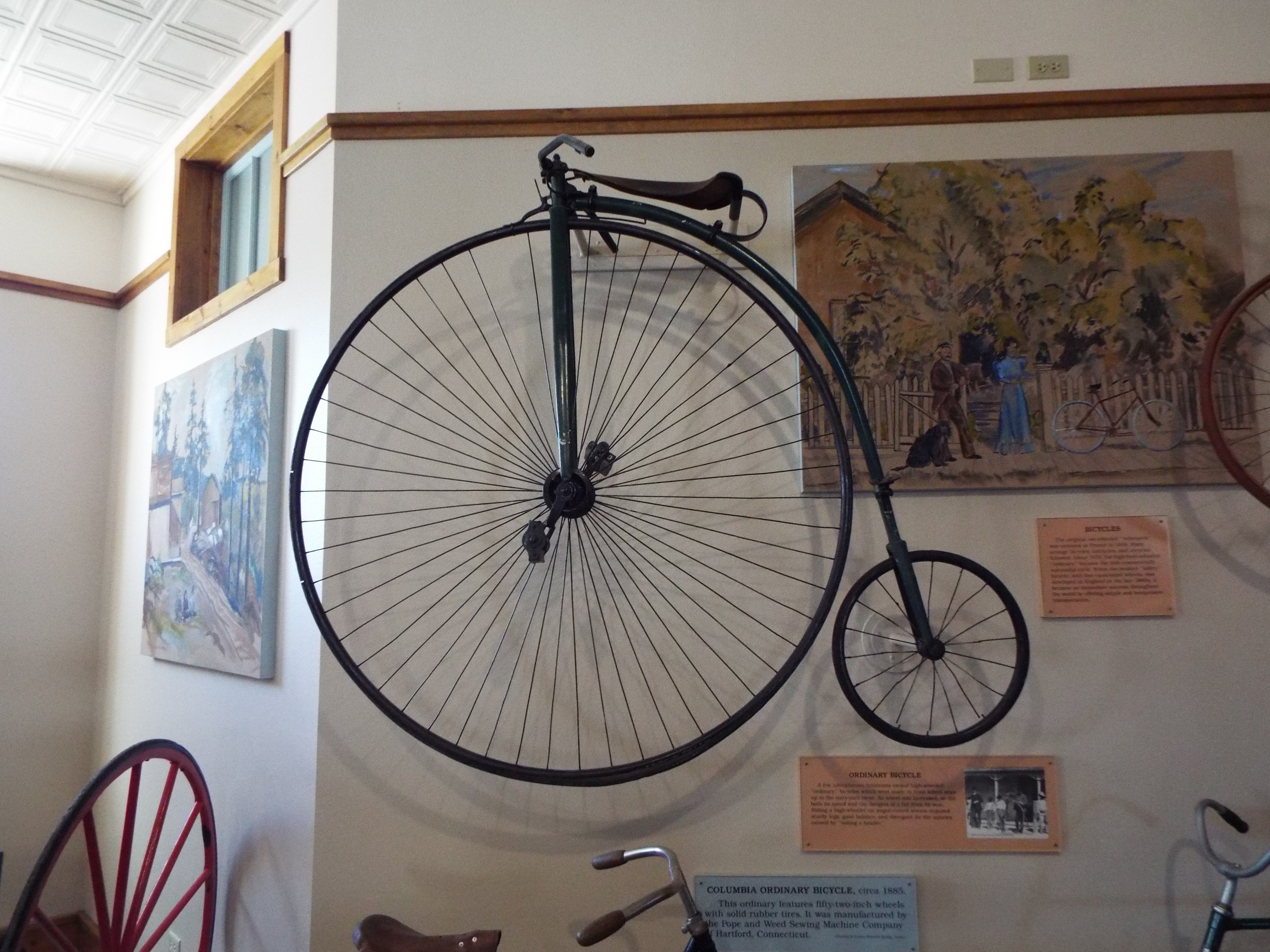
A 1937 Columbia Ordinary Bicycle on exhibit.

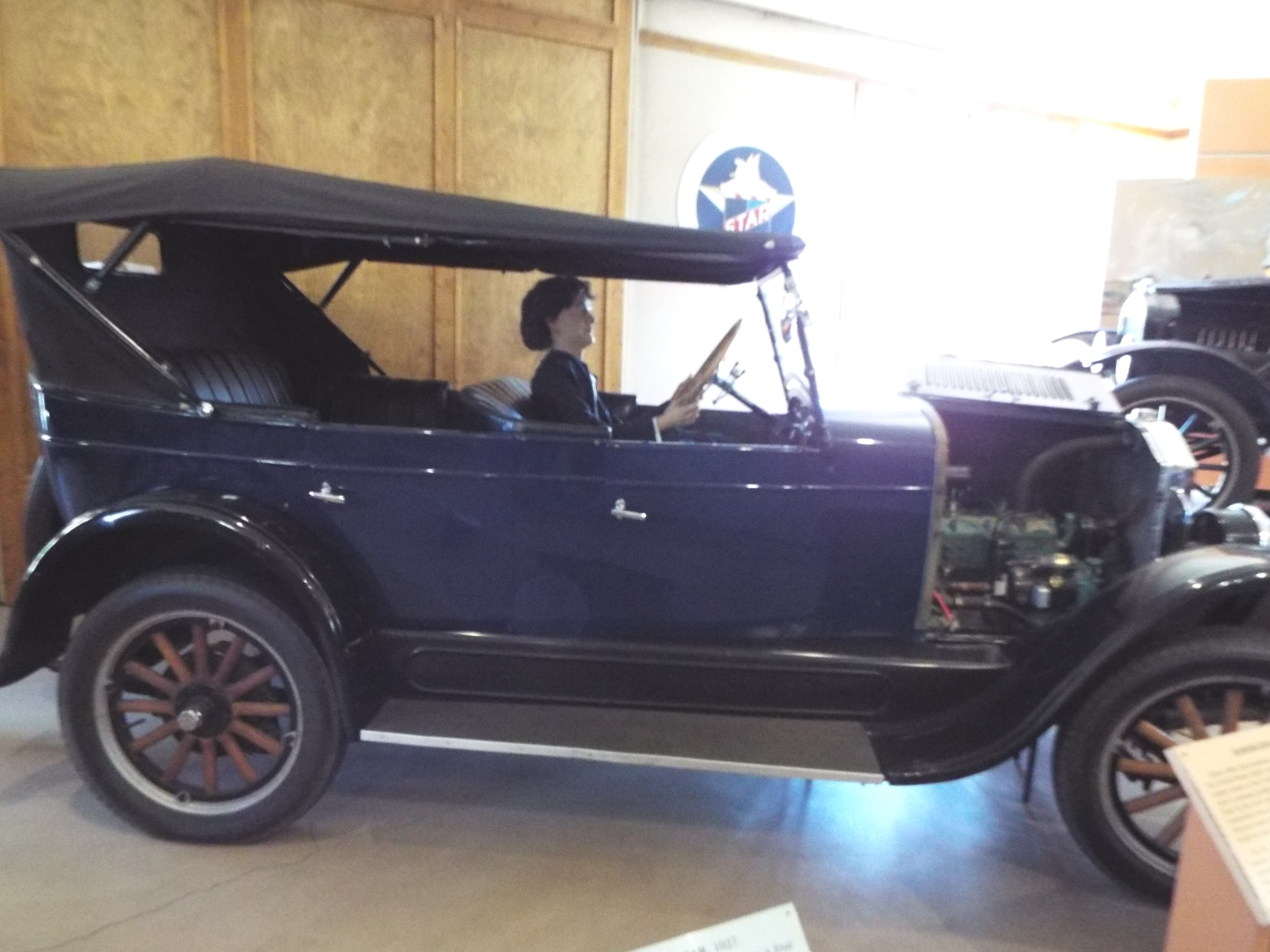
Sharlot Hall's 1927 Durant Star Touring Car on exhibit.

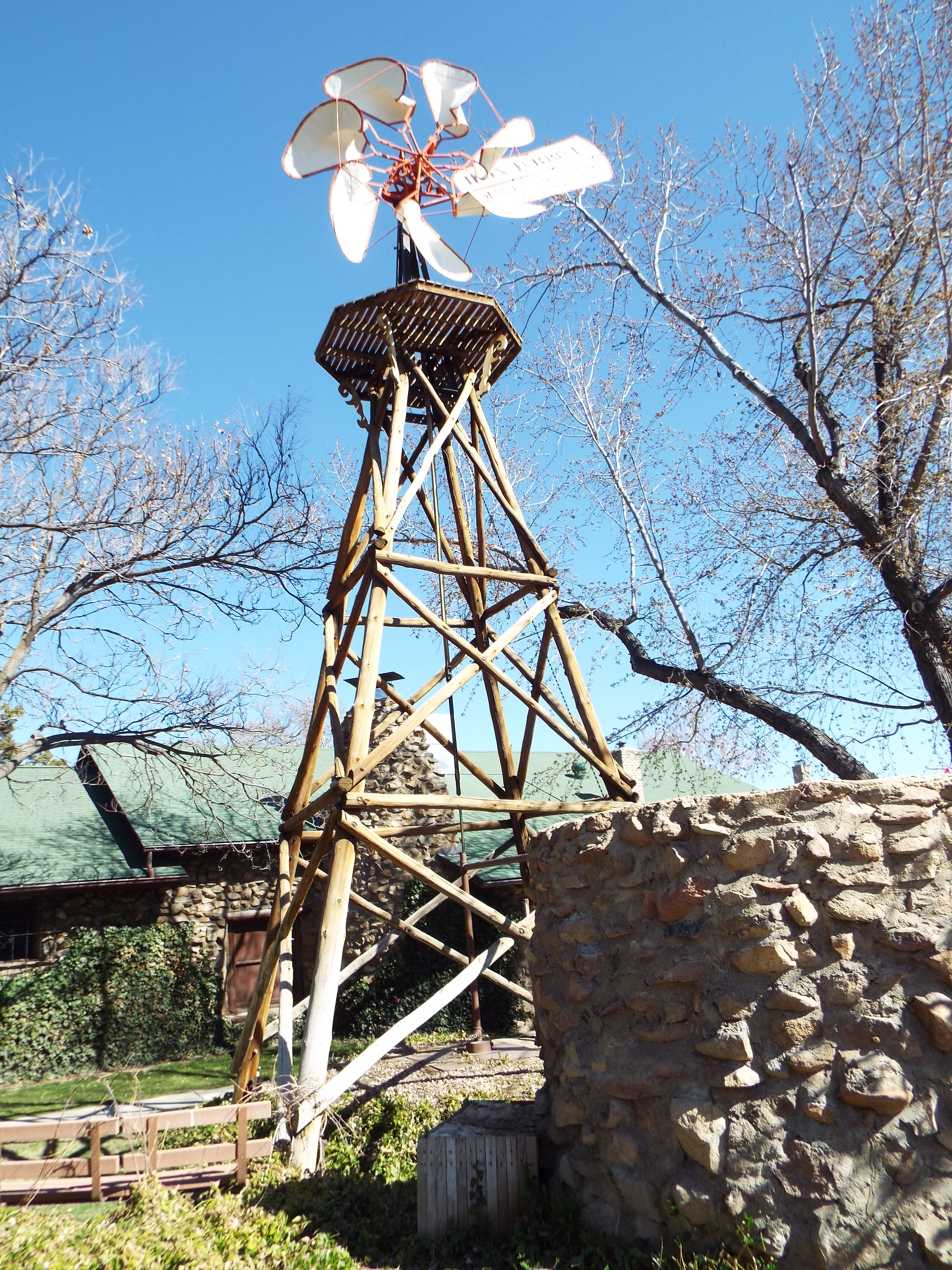
The Iron Turbine Windmill.

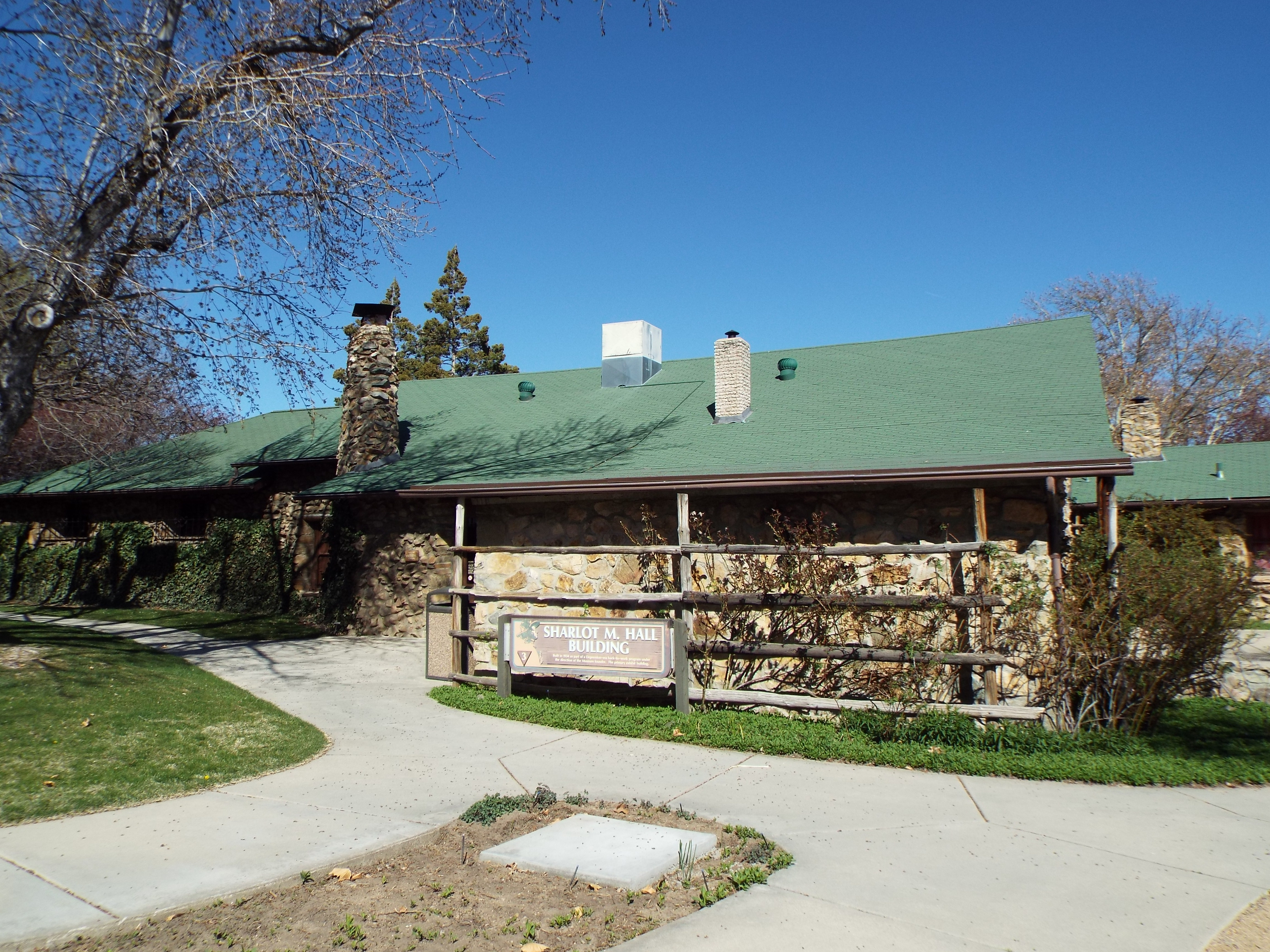
The Sharlot M. Hall building which also served as her residence

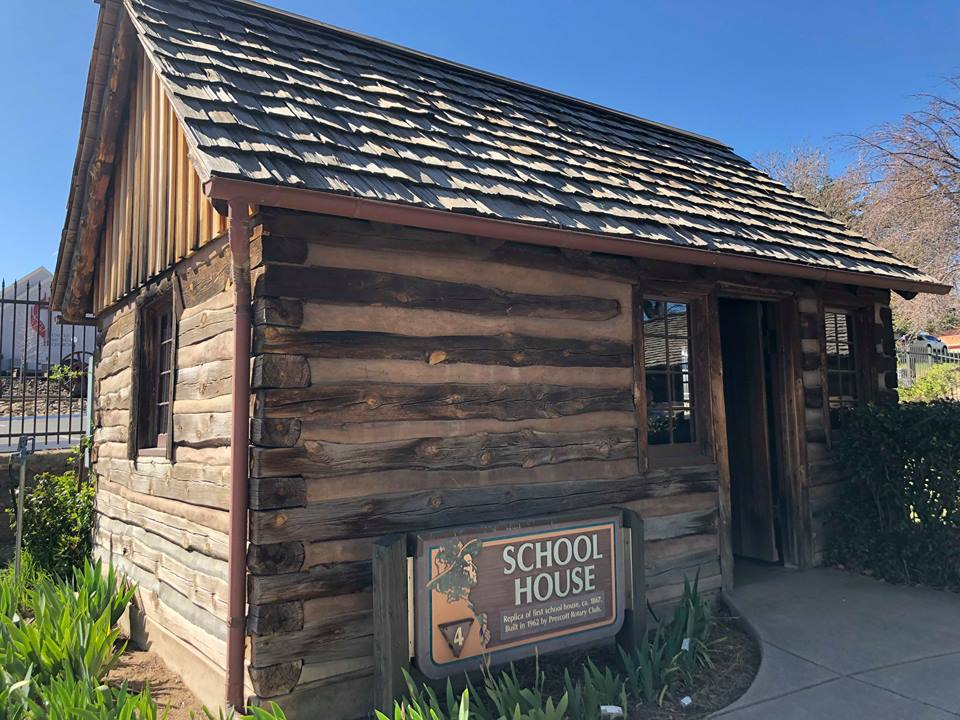
Replica of Prescott's first 1872 community schoolhouse.

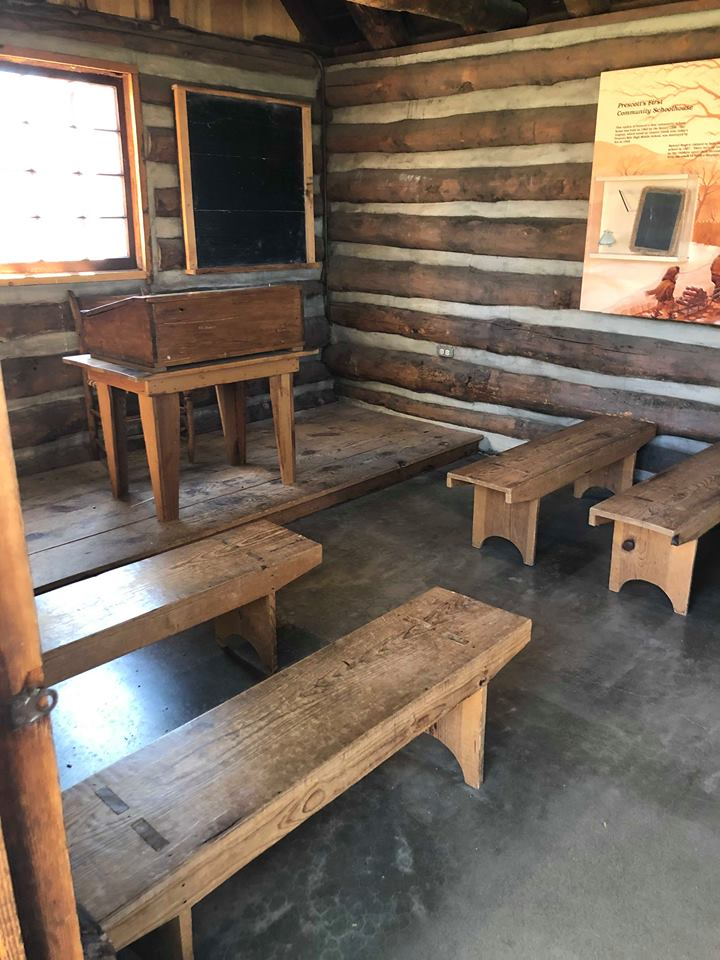
Inside the replica of Prescott's first community schoolhouse.

== See also ==
- Pauline Weaver, mountain man who is buried on the grounds
