= Gillock Island =

Island in Antarctica

- Location within Antarctica

Geography
- Location: Antarctica
- Coordinates: 70°26′S 71°52′E
- Length: 37 km (23 mi)

Administration
- Administered under the Antarctic Treaty System

Demographics
- Population: Uninhabited

Gillock Island is an ice-covered island, 37 kilometres (20 nmi) long and 3.7 to 11.1 kilometres (2 to 6 nmi) wide, with numerous rock outcrops exposed along its flanks. It is aligned north–south and lies in the eastern part of Amery Ice Shelf.

Delineated in 1952 by John H. Roscoe from air photos taken by U.S. Navy Operation Highjump (1946–47). Named by him for Lieutenant Robert A. Gillock, U.S. Navy, navigator on Operation Highjump photographic flights over this and other coastal areas between 14°E and 164°E.

The Bain Crags (70°30′S 71°45′E) are a number of rock exposures, many of which are banded, in the face of or projecting from the ice cliffs along the south part of the west side of Gillock Island. The feature was visited in January 1969 by J.H.C. Bain, geologist with the Australian National Antarctic Research Expeditions Prince Charles Mountains survey party, after whom it is named.

== See also ==
- Composite Antarctic Gazetteer
- List of Antarctic and sub-Antarctic islands
- List of Antarctic islands south of 60° S
- SCAR
- Territorial claims in Antarctica
