= Korie =

Korie or Korrie are a given name, nickname and surname which may refer to:

== Given name ==
- Korie Black (born 2002), American football player
- Korie Hlede (born 1975), Croatian basketball player and coach
- Korie Homan (born 1986), Dutch wheelchair tennis player
- Korie Lucious (born 1989), American basketball player
- Korie Robertson (born 1973), member of the cast of the reality TV show Duck Dynasty

== Surname ==
- Michael Korie (born 1955), American librettist and lyricist
- Riko Korie, Japanese illustrator

== See also ==
- Corie, given name
- Korrie Layun Rampan (1953–2015), Indonesian writer, poet, literary critic, journalist and politician
- Korey, given name and surname
- Kory (given name)
- Kaye Kory (born 1947), American politician
- Pierre Kory, American critical care physician
- Cory, given name
