= Corrie =

Corrie may refer to:

== Arts and entertainment ==
- nickname of Coronation Street, a long-running British television soap opera
  - Corrie!, a play written to celebrate the 50th Anniversary of Coronation Street in 2010
- The Corries, a Scottish folk group

== People ==
- Corrie (surname), a surname (including a list of persons with the name)
  - Corrie family, a Scottish family
- Corrie (given name), a given name (including a list of persons with the name)

== Other uses ==
- Corrie or cirque, a terrain feature created by glaciation in high mountains
- Corrie, Arran, a village on the Isle of Arran, Scotland
- A frequently used abbreviation of Corriechatachan, near Broadford on the Isle of Skye (the tack of a cadet branch of the Clan Mackinnon)

== See also ==
- Corrie Spout, a Scottish waterfall
- MV Rachel Corrie, a ship named after Rachel Corrie
- Corey (disambiguation)
- Corry (disambiguation)
- Cory (disambiguation)
