= Thomas Hughes Corry =

Northern Irish botanist (1859–1883)

Thomas Hughes Corry (19 December 1859 – 9 August 1883) was an Irish botanist. He drowned at the age of 23 but was credited as a co-author of Flora of the North East of Ireland with S.A.Stewart.

== Life ==
T. H. Corry was born in Belfast 19 December 1859. He studied botany at Cambridge and became Assistant to Cardale Babington. In 1877, as an undergraduate, he joined S.A. Stewart in the preparation of Flora of the North-east of Ireland. In 1879 he discovered Hieracium hypocharoides in Ireland. In August 1883, before he was 24, Corry, with a companion Charles Dickson, lost his life in a boating accident on Lough Gill.

Corry's British specimens in the Ulster Museum are dated mainly 1881 - 1883 and are mostly from England.

Corry is remembered as co-author of Flora of the North-east of Ireland which is still published in new editions.
