= Cori (name) =

Cori is both a surname and a given name. Notable people with the name include:

== Given name ==
- Cori Alexander (born 1985), American soccer player and photographer
- Cori Blakebrough (born 1967), Canadian basketball player
- Cori Bush (born 1976), American politician, nurse, pastor, and activist
- Cori Close (born 1971), American basketball coach
- Cori Gauff (born 2004), American tennis player known as Coco Gauff
- Cori Henry (born 1976), British sprinter
- Cori Morris (born 1971), Canadian curler
- Cori Schumacher (born 1977), American surfer, social justice advocate, scholar, and politician
- Cori Thomas (fl. from 2008)), American author, dramatist, playwright, and screenwriter
- Cori Yarckin (born 1982), American actress and singer
- Cori Zarek (fl. from 2000), American lawyer, public interest technologist

== Surname ==
- Carl Ferdinand Cori (1896–1984), Austrian-American biochemist
- Deysi Cori (born 1993), Peruvian chess player
- Gerty Cori (1896–1957), American biochemist
- Jorge Cori (born 1995), Peruvian chess player
- Sacha Cori (born 1989), Italian footballer

== See also ==
- Corri, a surname
- Cory, a given name and surname
- Corey, a given name and surname
