= Cory Morgan (ice hockey) =

Canadian ice hockey player

- Born: August 20, 1978 (age 47) Blue Sky, AB, CAN
- Height: 6 ft 2 in (188 cm)
- Weight: 190 lb (86 kg; 13 st 8 lb)
- Position: Right wing
- Shot: Right
- Played for: AHL; Syracuse Crunch; Houston Aeros; WCHL; Tacoma Sabercats; Idaho Steelheads; ECHL; Dayton Bombers; Texas Wildcatters; BNL/EIHL; Dundee Stars; Newcastle Vipers
- NHL draft: Undrafted
- Playing career: 1999–2007

Cory Morgan (born August 20, 1978) is a Canadian former professional ice hockey player.

== Career ==
Morgan played major junior hockey in the Western Hockey League with the Prince Albert Raiders before making his professional hockey debut during the 1999–2000 season with the Tacoma Sabercats of the West Coast Hockey League.

Morgan played his final three seasons in the British Elite leagues, winning the 2004–2005 British National League title with the Dundee Stars, and the 2005–06 Elite Ice Hockey League Playoff Championships with the Newcastle Vipers.
