= Corry baronets =

Baronetcy in the Baronetage of the United Kingdom

Escutcheon of the Corry baronets of Dunraven

The Corry baronetcy, of Dunraven in the County of Antrim, is a title in the Baronetage of the United Kingdom. It was created on 10 September 1885 for James Corry, Member of Parliament for Belfast from 1874 to 1885 and Armagh Mid from 1886 to 1891. The 2nd Baronet was a Director of the Cunard Steamship Company.

The Corry family was Scotch-Irish, settled Turnagardy near Newtownards, County Down. The title's reference to "Dunraven" is derived from the 1st Baronet's residence in Belfast.

== Corry baronets, of Dunraven (1885) ==
- Sir James Porter Corry, 1st Baronet (1826–1891)
- Sir William Corry, 2nd Baronet (1859–1926)
- Sir James Perowne Ivo Myles Corry, 3rd Baronet (1892–1987)
- Sir William James Corry, 4th Baronet (1924–2000)
- Sir James Michael Corry, 5th Baronet (born 1946)

The heir apparent is the present holder's son William James Alexander Corry (born 1981).

== Notes ==
Baronetage of the United Kingdom
Preceded by Thornhill baronets	Corry baronets of Dunraven; 10 September 1885	Succeeded by Morris baronets
