= Corie =

Corie is a given name. Notable people with the name include:

- Corie Andrews (born 1997), English footballer
- Corie Beveridge (born 1974), Canadian curler
- Corie Blount (born 1969), American basketball player
- Corie Mapp (born 1978), British-Barbadian para athlete and soldier
- Corinne "Corie" Stoddard (born 2001), American short track speed skater

== See also ==
- Corrie (given name)
- Corey, given name and surname
- Cory, given name and surname
- Korie, given name and surname
