= Sharlot Hall =

American poet and historian (1870–1943)

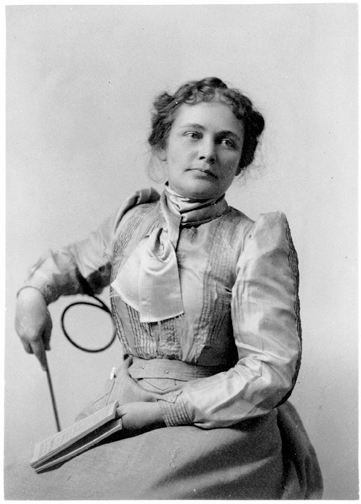
- Hall, c. 1911
- Born: October 27, 1870; Lincoln County, Kansas, US
- Died: April 9, 1943 (aged 72); Prescott, Arizona, US
- Resting place: Arizona Pioneers' Home Cemetery, Prescott
- Occupations: Poet, historian
- Known for: First woman to hold office in Arizona

Sharlot Mabridth Hall (October 27, 1870 – April 9, 1943) was an American journalist, poet and historian. She was the first woman to hold an office in the Arizona Territorial government and her personal collection of photographs and artifacts served as the starting collection for a history museum which bears her name.

== Biography ==
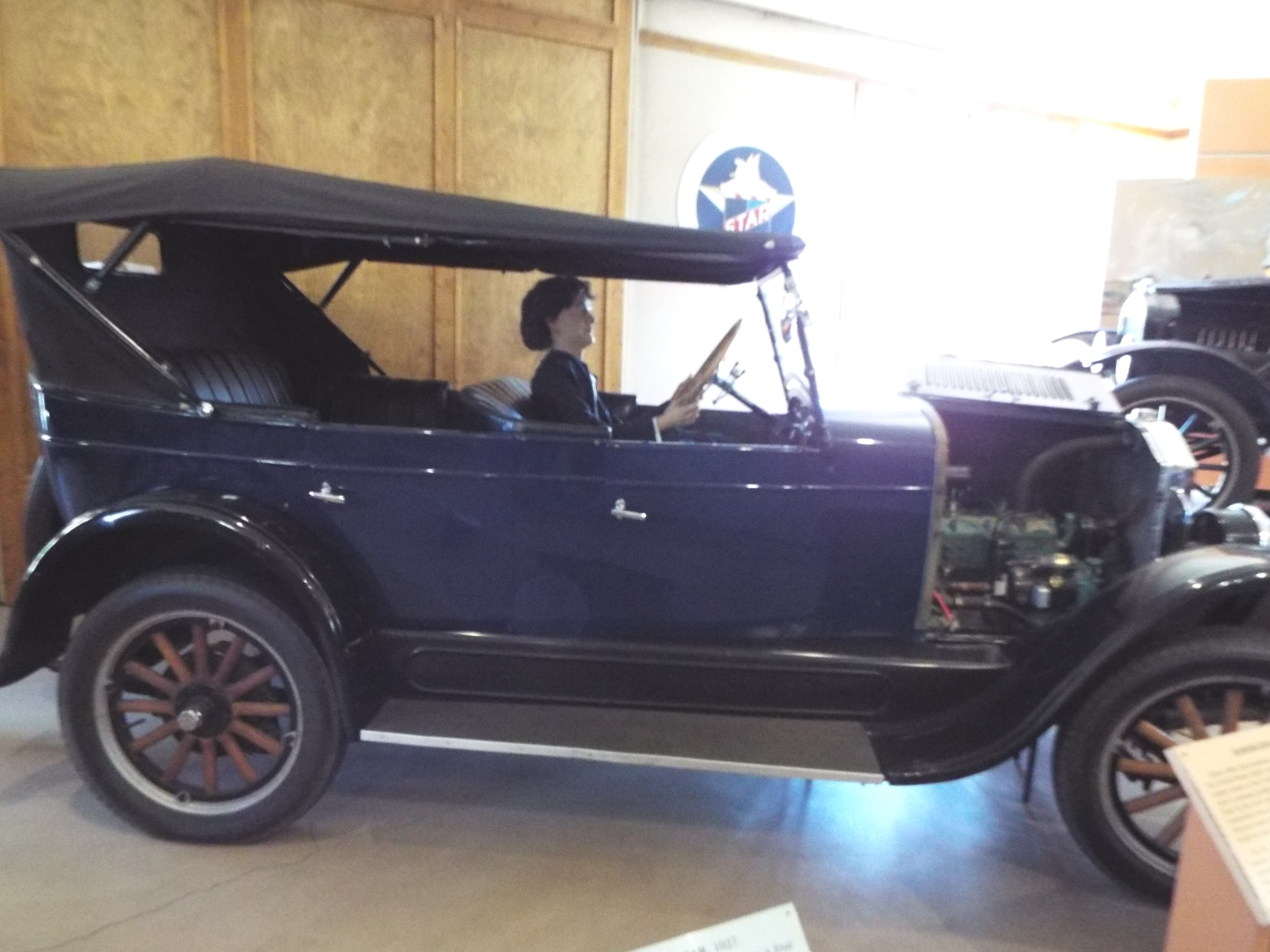
Sharlot Hall's 1927 Durant Star Touring Car on exhibit in the Sharlot Hall Museum.

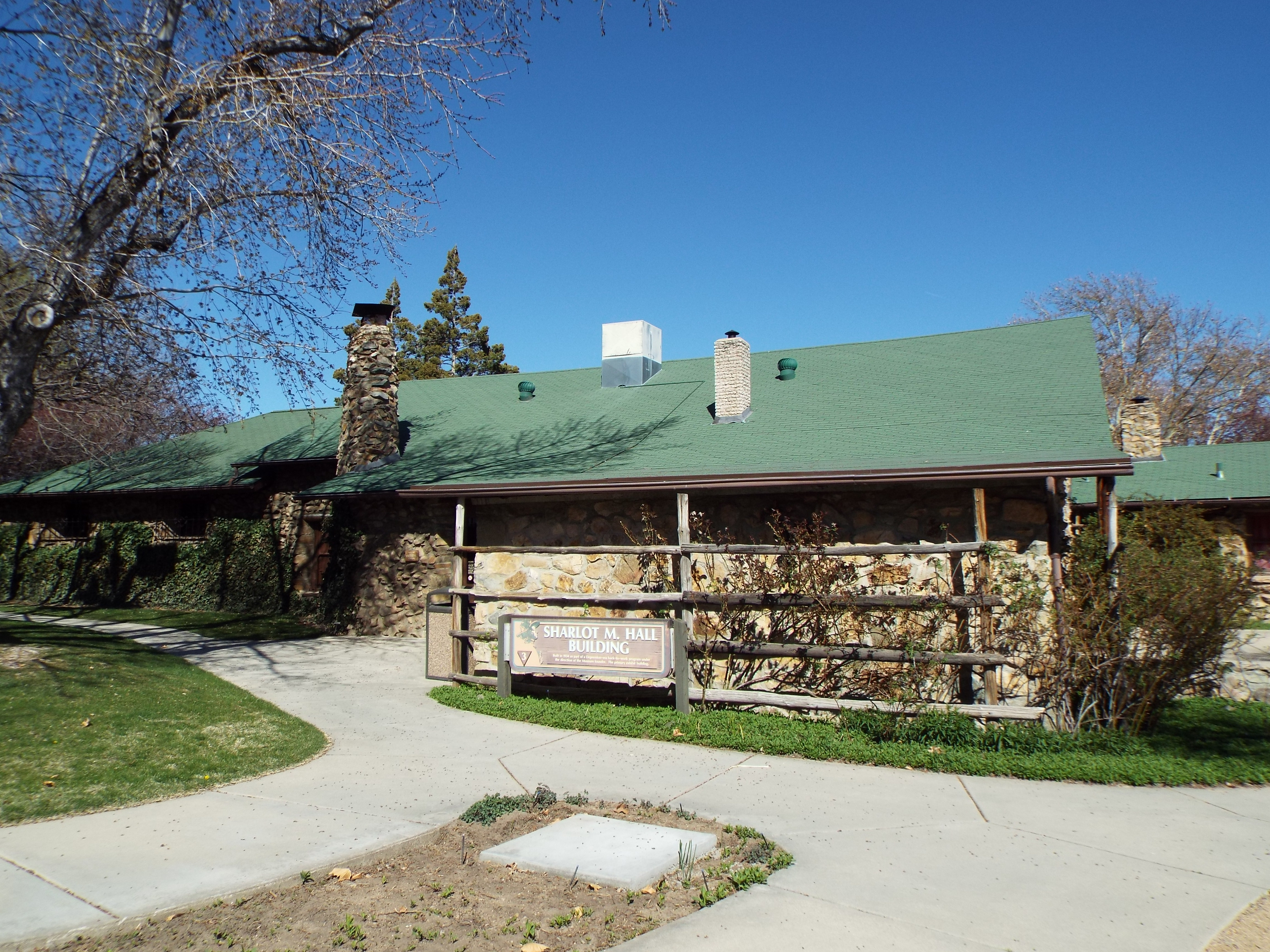
The Sharlot M. Hall Building which also served as her residence.

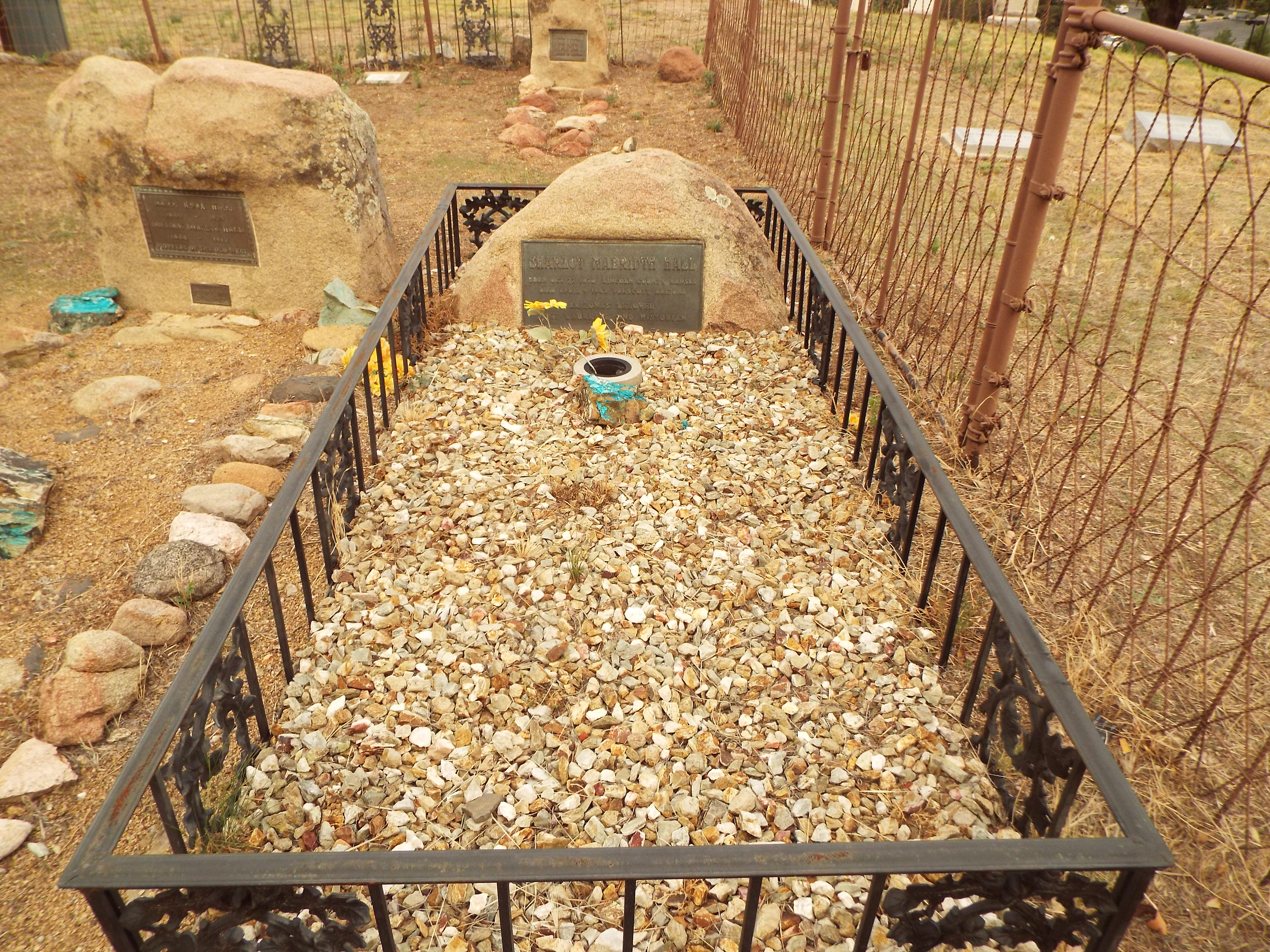
Grave-site of Sharlot Hall

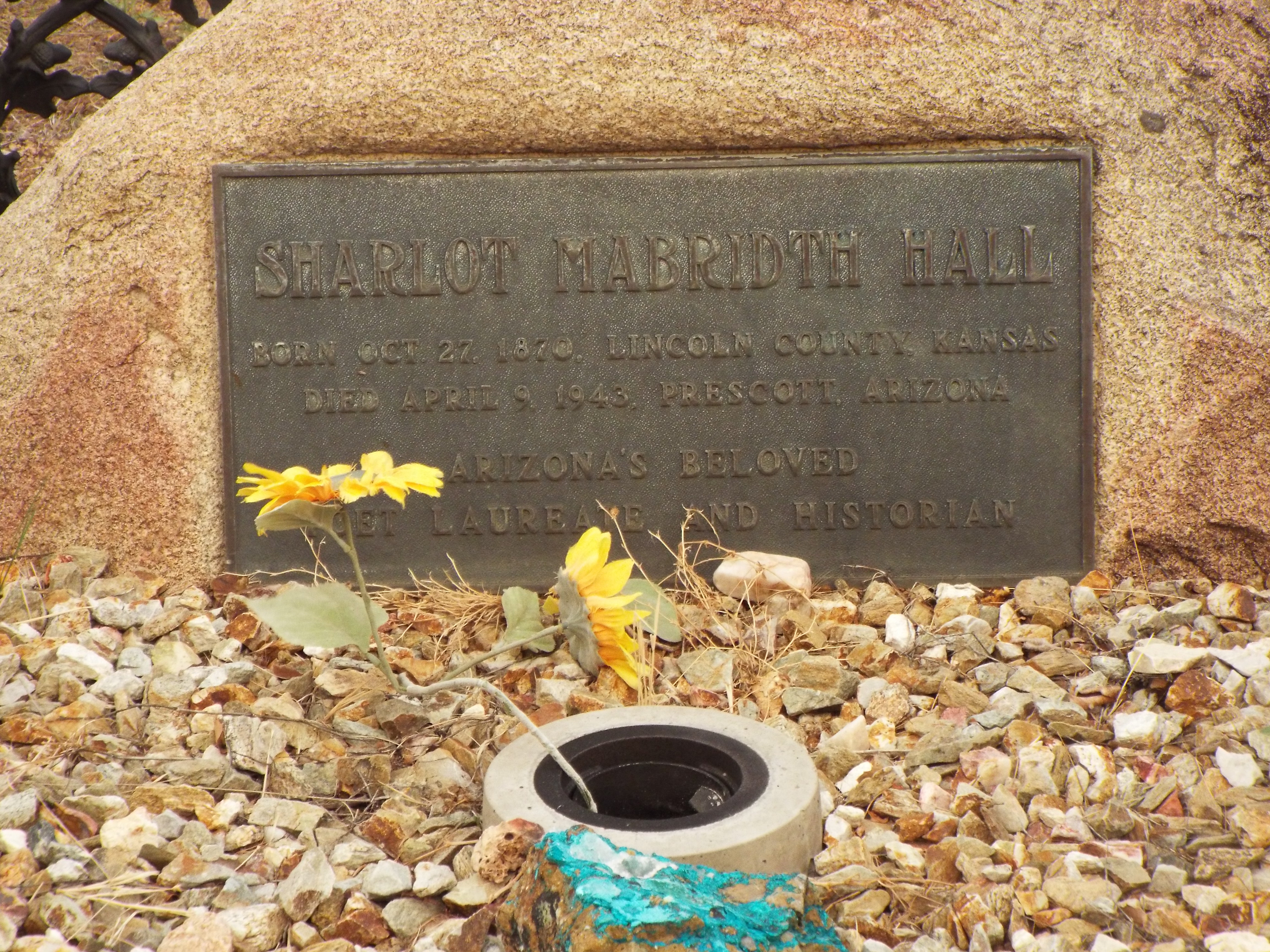
Sharlot Hall's grave merker

Hall was born to James Polk Knox and Adeline Susannah Boblett Hall in Lincoln County, Kansas on October 27, 1870. In November 1881, her family followed the Santa Fe Trail to Arizona Territory, moving to the Orchard Ranch on the Lynx Creek 20 miles south of Prescott. During the trip, near Dodge City, she was thrown from her horse and suffered an injury to her back or hip. The pain of the injury would remain with her the rest of her life. Hall was educated in public schools, first near the present location of Dewey, Arizona and later in Prescott. At an early age, Hall demonstrated an interest and talent in poetry. Upon graduation she went to Los Angeles to attend the Cumnock School of Expression. In 1921 Hall received an honorary Bachelor of Arts degree from the University of Arizona.

At age 20, Hall sold her first article to a children's magazine for US$4.00. By age 22, she was working as a journalist, poet, and essayist. Hall became a regular contributor to Charles Lummis' magazine Land of Sunshine and in 1901, when two other poets were unable to complete their deadline, she wrote the poem which announced the magazine's new name of Out West. In 1906, Hall was promoted to associate editor for the magazine.

In 1905, when legislation to admit Arizona Territory and New Mexico Territory as a single combined state was proposed in the United States Congress, Hall responded by writing the poem Arizona. The poem, which mocked the proposal and made the case for Arizona's independent statehood, was published in several publications and a copy of the poem was given to every member of Congress. In 1909, Hall was appointed Territorial Historian by Governor Sloan. This was followed the next year with the release of Cactus and pine: songs of the Southwest, her first compilation. In 1911, Hall made a trip to the Arizona Strip in an effort to raise awareness of the area's potential among Arizona residents and prevent Utah from obtaining the region as Nevada had obtained Pah-Ute County in 1866. In 1912, she resigned as Territorial Historian and returned to her family ranch to care for her parents.

Hall returned to the public view in 1923 with the release of an expanded version of Cactus and pine containing a selection of additional poems. This was followed by her selection as a presidential elector, voting for Calvin Coolidge, in 1925. Hall wore a custom dress made of copper for the balloting ceremony. She also used her trip to Washington D.C. to visit a variety of museums and learn about their management.

Following the death of her father, Hall acquired the cabin which had served as the "Governor's mansion" for Arizona Territory's first governors. In addition to her living quarters, she used the building to house her collection of artifacts related to Arizona pioneers and pre-historic Yavapai county. This move was followed, in 1928, with her founding of the Prescott Historical Society. The same year she opened what she called the Old Governor's Mansion Museum, now known as the Sharlot Hall Museum.

Over the following years, Hall oversaw the expansion of her museum through the acquisition of a variety of additional historical buildings. She was also a popular speaker, giving talks on local history and folklore to schools and clubs throughout the state. Hall died on April 9, 1943, and was buried in a family plot in Prescott's Pioneer Cemetery.

Two years after her death, the Prescott Historical Society changed their name to the Sharlot Hall Historical Society. Additionally, Hall was among the first to be inducted into the Arizona Women's Hall of Fame. In 1984, the Sharlot Hall Award was established and is awarded annually to "an Arizona woman who has made a valuable contribution to the understanding and awareness of Arizona and its history".

== Bibliography ==
- Cactus and pine: Songs of the Southwest (1910, 1923)
- Poems of a Ranch Woman
