= Kory (given name) =

Kory is a unisex given name. It is a male version of the name Cora, which has Greek origins and is the maiden name of the goddess Persephone. The name also can have origins from the Gaelic word coire, which means "in a cauldron", or "In a hollow". Notable people with the name include:

== People ==
- Kory Falite (born 1986), American ice hockey player
- Kory Johnson (fl. 1991), American environmentalist
- Kory Karlander (born 1972), Canadian ice hockey player
- Kory Kath (born 1977), American politician
- Kory Kocur (born 1969), Canadian ice hockey player
- Kory Lichtensteiger (born 1985), American football player
- Kory Minor (born 1976), American football player
- Kory Roberts (born 1997), English footballer
- Kory Scoran (born 1981), Canadian ice hockey player
- Kory Sheets (born 1985), American football player
- Kory Stamper, lexicographer and author
- Kory Tarpenning (born 1962), American pole vaulter
- Kory Teneycke (born 1974), Canadian media executive and Director of Communications for Prime Minister Stephen Harper

== Fictional characters ==
- Kory (Princess Koriand'r of Tamaran), or Starfire, comic book character since 1980

== See also ==
- Korie, given name and surname
- Korey, given name and surname
- Cory, given name
- Corey, given name and surname
