= Korey =

Korey/Korrey are a given name and surname. Notable people with the name include:

== Given name ==
- Korey Banks (born 1979), Canadian football player
- Korey Cooper (born 1972), musician, Skillet
- Korey "KJ" Duff (born 2005), American football player
- Korey Hall (born 1983), American football player
- Korey Jones (born 1989), American football player
- Korey Smith (born 1991), English football player
- Korey Stringer (1974–2001), American football player
- Korey Williams (born 1987), American football player

== Surname ==
- Tinsel Korey (born 1980), Canadian actress and musician
- William Korey (1922–2009), lobbyist

== See also ==
- Kory (given name)
- Kory (disambiguation), includes people with the surname Kory
- Corey, given name and surname
- Korie, given name and surname
