= Kori =

Kori may refer to:

== Culture and language ==
- Koli people, an Indian ethnic group
- Kori caste, a weaving caste of India
- Kori rotti, a spicy dish from India
- Kori or kouri, the Hausa language term for a wadi
- Kori, a Maori language term for movement (can be used as a verb or noun)
- Kori Kambla, an agriculture-based celebration in India

== Locations ==
- Kori (woreda), a district in Afar Region, Ethiopia
- Kori, Central African Republic
- Kori, Bushehr, a village in Iran
- Ab Kori, a village in Iran
- Koori, Fukushima, a town in Japan
- Kori Chiefdom, a chiefdom in Sierra Leone
- Kori Ginguiri, a village in Benin
- Kori Station, railway station in Tokyo, Japan
- Kori Nuclear Power Plant, a nuclear power plant in South Korea

== People ==
=== Individual people ===
- Kori Bernards, American businesswoman
- Kori Carter, American track and field athlete
- Kori Cheverie, Canadian ice hockey player
- Kori Dickerson, American football player
- Kōri Hisataka, Japanese martial artist
- Kori Inkpen, Canadian computer scientist
- Kori Kelley-Seehafer, American cyclist
- Kori King, American drag performer
- Kori Lamaster, American murder victim
- Kori Newkirk, American artist
- Kori Rae, American film producer
- Kori Schake, American international relations scholar
- Ashok Kori, Indian politician
- Dal Bahadur Kori, Indian politician
- Gaya Prasad Kori, Indian politician
- Harumi Kori, Japanese football player
- Ladduram Kori, Indian politician
- Nanaka Kori, Japanese athlete
- Radhey Shyam Kori, Indian politician

=== Fictional characters ===
- Kori Turbowitz, character in the 2006 film Cars
- Starfire, or Koriand'r, DC Comics character, nicknamed "Kori"

== Other ==
- Kōri, a possible Japanese reading of Goryeo, a dynasty in Korea
- Kori bustard (Ardeotis kori), a large bird native to Africa
- Kutch kori, currency from India, abolished in 1947

== See also ==
- Coree (disambiguation)
- Cori (disambiguation)
- Cory (disambiguation)
- Khori (disambiguation)
- Kory (disambiguation)
- Kouri (disambiguation)
- Kuri (disambiguation)
- Koli (disambiguation)
- Koeri (disambiguation)
