= Kuri =

Kuri may refer to:

== People ==
- Aren Kuri (born 1991), a Japanese baseball player
- Anuar Kuri, a Mexican drag queen and singer
- Daniel Ludlow Kuri (born 1961), a Mexican politician
- Emile Kuri (1907–2000), Mexican-American film set decorator
- Ippei Kuri (1940–2023), a Japanese manga artist and businessman
- Jean Succar Kuri (born 1944), convicted Mexican businessman
- John A. Kuri, an American author and writer
- Yōji Kuri (born 1928), a Japanese cartoonist and filmmaker
- Kuri Kikuoka (Takagi Michinokuo, 1909–1970), pen-name of a Japanese author of poetry and novels
- Kuri Prathap, an Indian film actor

== Places ==
=== Iran ===
- Kuri, Bushehr
- Kuri, Dashti, Bushehr Province
- Kuri, Fars
- Kuri, Kermanshah
- Kuri, Khuzestan
- Kuri Rural District, Bushehr Province

=== Other countries ===
- Kuri, Estonia
- Koru, Turkey (formerly known as Kuri)
- Kuri, India
- Kuri, Bhopalgarh, India
- Kuri, Varanasi, India
- Kuri railway station, Kollam district, Kerala, India
- Kuri, ICT, Pakistan
- Kuri Bay, Western Australia

== Other uses ==
- Kurī, the Māori name for the Polynesian dog
- Kuri cattle, a breed of cattle
- Kuri (kitchen), the kitchen of a Zen monastery
- Kuri (栗), the Japanese Chestnut
- Kuri language (disambiguation)
- Red Kuri, a cultivar of winter squash.

== See also ==
- Kury (disambiguation)
- Kuris (disambiguation)
- Khouri, or Khoury, a surname
- Koori, indigenous Australian people from New South Wales and Victoria
- Kurree, a village in Punjab, Pakistan
