= Amethi Assembly constituency =

Vidhan Sabha constituency in Uttar Pradesh

Amethi
- Constituency No. 186 for the Uttar Pradesh Legislative Assembly

Constituency details
- Country: India
- Region: North India
- State: Uttar Pradesh
- District: Amethi
- Lok Sabha constituency: Amethi
- Reservation: None

Member of Legislative Assembly
- 18th Uttar Pradesh Legislative Assembly
- Incumbent Maharaji Prajapati
- Party: Samajwadi Party
- Elected year: 2022

Amethi is a constituency of the Uttar Pradesh Legislative Assembly, that covers the city of Amethi in the Amethi district of Uttar Pradesh, India. It is one of the five assembly constituencies which fall under Amethi Lok Sabha constituency.

Currently, this seat is represented by Samajwadi party politician Maharaji Prajapati, who won the last Assembly election.

Sanjay Singh has been a major player in the local politics. His father, Rananjay Singh, was elected from this seat. Later Sanjay Singh himself, his first wife Garima Singh, and his second wife Ameeta Singh have all been elected from the constituency.

== Members of Vidhan Sabha ==
Year	Winner	Party
1951	Kunwar Rananjay Singh	Independent
1957	Rama Kant Singh	Indian National Congress
1962	Vaidya Baij Nath Singh	Indian National Congress
1967	Ravindra Pratap Singh	Bharatiya Jana Sangh
1969	Raja Rananjaya Singh	Bharatiya Jana Sangh
1974	Raja Rananjaya Singh	Indian National Congress
1977	Haricharan Yadav	Janata Party
1980	Rajkumar Sanjaya Sinh	Indian National Congress
1985	Rajkumar Sanjaya Sinh	Indian National Congress
1989	Haricharan Yadav	Indian National Congress
1991	Haricharan Yadav	Indian National Congress
1993	Jamuna Mishra	Bharatiya Janata Party
1996	Ram Harsh Singh	Indian National Congress
2002	Ameeta Singh	Bharatiya Janata Party
2007	Ameeta Singh	Indian National Congress
2012	Gayatri Prasad Prajapati	Samajwadi Party
2017	Garima Singh	Bharatiya Janata Party
2022	Maharaji Prajapati	Samajwadi Party

== Election results ==
Vote share of winning candidates
2022	46.46%
2017	34.21%
2012	35.84%
2007	40.59%
2002	42.23%
1996	34.01%
1993	24.94%
1991	48.68%
1989	65.14%

=== 2027 ===
2027 Uttar Pradesh Legislative Assembly election: Amethi
Party	Candidate	Votes	%	±%
BJP				
INDIA				
BSP				
NOTA	None of the above			
Majority				
Turnout				
gain from		Swing		

=== 2022 ===
2022 Uttar Pradesh Legislative Assembly election: Amethi
Party	Candidate	Votes	%	±%
SP	Maharaji Prajapati	88,217	46.46	+14.94
BJP	Sanjaya Sinh	70,121	36.93	+2.72
INC	Ashish Shukla	14,080	7.42	−3.39
BSP	Ragini Tiwari	10,202	5.37	−10.7
NOTA	None of the above	1,206	0.64	+0.27
Majority		18,096	9.53	+6.84
Turnout		189,864	54.27	−1.83
SP gain from BJP		Swing		

=== 2017 ===
2017 Uttar Pradesh Legislative Assembly election: Amethi
Party	Candidate	Votes	%	±%
BJP	Garima Singh	64,226	34.21	
SP	Gayatri Prasad Prajapati	59,161	31.52	
BSP	Ramji Maurya	30,175	16.07	
INC	Ameeta Sinh	20,291	10.81	
NOTA	None of the above	694	0.37	
Majority		5,065	2.69	
Turnout		187,717	56.1	

=== 2012 ===
2012 Uttar Pradesh Legislative Assembly election: Amethi
Party	Candidate	Votes	%	±%
SP	Gayatri Prasad Prajapati	58,434	35.84	+18.29
INC	Ameeta Sinh	49,674	30.47	−10.12
BSP	Ashish Shukla	35,374	21.70	−8.41
BJP	Rashmi Singh	8,616	5.28	−0.07
Majority		8,760	5.38	−5.10
Turnout		162,891	55.05	+5.06
SP gain from INC		Swing		

=== 2007 ===
2007 Uttar Pradesh Legislative Assembly election: Amethi
Party	Candidate	Votes	%	±%
INC	Ameeta Sinh	48,108	40.59	−1.64
BSP	Ashish Shukla	35,684	30.11	+24.81
SP	Rajesh Kumar	20,804	17.55	+1.12
BJP	Govind Narayan	6,340	5.35	−36.88
Independent	Vijay Bahadur	2,634	2.22	
Majority		12,424	10.48	−3.69
Turnout		118,519	49.99	−5.91
INC gain from BJP		Swing		

=== 2002 ===
2002 Uttar Pradesh Legislative Assembly election: Amethi
Party	Candidate	Votes	%	±%
BJP	Ameeta Sinh	55,949	42.23	+12.18
INC	Ashish Shukla	37,184	28.06	−5.95
SP	Gayatri Prasad Prajapati	21,764	16.43	−7.25
BSP	Tej Pratap Dwivedi	7,023	5.30	
AD	Babu Lal	3,451	2.60	
Majority		18,765	14.17	+10.21
Turnout		132,501	55.90	+7.95
BJP gain from INC		Swing		

=== 1996 ===
1996 Uttar Pradesh Legislative Assembly election: Amethi
Party	Candidate	Votes	%	±%
INC	Ram Harsh Singh	36,069	34.01	
BJP	Jamuna Mishra	31,870	30.05	+5.11
SP	Gayatri Prasad Prajapati	25,112	23.68	+2.78
Independent	Haricharan Yadav	5,569	5.25	−13.40
Independent	Lalji Maurya	3,100	2.92	
Majority		4,199	3.96	−0.08
Turnout		106,057	47.95	−0.52
INC gain from BJP		Swing		

=== 1993 ===
1993 Uttar Pradesh Legislative Assembly election: Amethi
Party	Candidate	Votes	%	±%
BJP	Jamuna Mishra	23,270	24.94	−0.88
SP	Radhey Shyam Yadav	19,503	20.90	+20.90
Independent	Karmaraj Singh	17,616	18.88	
INC	Haricharan Yadav	17,406	18.65	−30.03
Bharatiya Rashtriya Party	Vinshi Ram	2,679	2.87	
Majority		3,767	4.04	−18.82
Turnout		93,316	48.47	+9.16
BJP gain from INC		Swing		

=== 1991 ===
1991 Uttar Pradesh Legislative Assembly election: Amethi
Party	Candidate	Votes	%	±%
INC	Haricharan Yadav	33,176	48.68	−16.46
BJP	Jamuna Prasad Mishra	17,597	25.82	+25.82
JD	Jai Bahadur Singh	6,065	8.90	−16.75
JP	Raghaw Ram	3,683	5.40	
Independent	Ram Karan Jaiswal	724	1.06	
Majority		15,579	22.86	−16.63
Turnout		68,145	39.31	−8.27
INC hold		Swing		

=== 1989 ===
1989 Uttar Pradesh Legislative Assembly election: Amethi
Party	Candidate	Votes	%	±%
INC	Haricharan Yadav	53,197	65.14	
JD	Raj Kumar Sanjay Singh	20,949	25.65	
BSP	Shri Ram	2,025	2.48	
Janata Party (JP)	Dwijendra Pd. Mishra	1,358	1.66	
Independent	Kalidin	1,063	1.30	
Majority		32,248	39.49	
Turnout		81,660	47.58	
INC hold		Swing		

=== 1951-1980 ===
- 1951: Kunwer Rananjai Singh (IND) 21,536 votes. Defeated Baijnath Singh (INC) 7,835 votes.
- 1957: Rama Kant Singh (INC) defeated Bijai Pal (Independent)
- 1962: Vaidya Baij Nath Singh (INC) defeated Ram Bali (Ind)
- 1967 R. P. Singh (BJS) defeated Baij Nath Singh Vaidya (INC)
- 1969: Raja Rananjaya Singh (Bharatiya Jana Sangh), defeated Baij Nath Singh Vaidya (INC)
- 1974: Raja Rananjai Singh (INC) defeated Ravindra Pratap Singh (BJS)
- 1977: Haricharan Yadav (Janata Party) 18,304 votes. Defeated Baij Nath Singh Vaidya (INC)
- 1980: Rajkumar Sanjay Singh (Congress-Indira) defeated Hari Charan JNP(SC)
