= Garima Singh =

Indian politician

Member of the Uttar Pradesh Legislative Assembly
- In office 2017–2022
- Preceded by: Gayatri Prasad Prajapati
- Succeeded by: Maharaji Prajapati
- Constituency: Amethi

Personal details
- Party: Bharatiya Janata Party
- Spouse: Sanjaya Sinh (m. 1973; div. 1995)
- Profession: Politician

Garima Singh is an Indian politician and a member of the 17th Legislative Assembly of Uttar Pradesh in India. Singh represented the Amethi Vidhan Sabha constituency, which is in Amethi district, Uttar Pradesh.

== Personal life ==
Garima Singh is legally married to politician, Sanjaya Sinh (also known as Sanjay Singh). Sanjay claims to be married to Ameeta Singh, the widow of Syed Modi, but Garima successfully contested the legitimacy of that marriage. Both the High Court and Supreme Court of India have declared the alleged mutual divorce between herself and Sanjay in 1995, which preceded his marriage to Ameeta, to be null and void. Sanjay has accepted the court rulings but maintains that Ameeta is his only legally wedded wife. Garima and Sanjay have a son and two daughters.

Sanjay Singh was adopted by the king of Amethi, Rananjay Singh, as his heir prior to the abolition of all royal privileges in India and as such he inherited the former royal estates. In 1989, he had removed his wife Garima from the palace after beginning a relationship with Ameeta, who had recently been widowed. In 2014, Garima and her children took up residence at another palace in Amethi, called Bhupati Bhawan, and refused to evacuate the property. Local people gathered to support her, claiming that she, rather than Ameeta, was the real queen. Amidst claims and counter-claims, Anant Vikram Singh, who is Sanjay's son, has had the support of his mother in alleging that Ameeta has been undermining his future inheritance of various formerly royal properties. Sanjay denies the allegations, and also denies claims that the local people are not being looked after by the family in the manner that is customary. Garima claims that she entered the palace in support of her children, who all blame Ameeta for the troubles that have arisen since Sanjay and Ameeta began their relationship.

=== Murder of Syed Modi ===
Syed Modi, a badminton player who had won numerous national and international titles, was shot dead on 28 July 1988 in Lucknow. The murder attracted worldwide attention. There were suggestions that Modi's wife, Ameeta, was involved in a relationship with Singh, who was a close friend of the couple and at whose house they had married. In late August, the Central Bureau of Investigation (CBI) launched a search of Singh's house. The investigation was urged upon the CBI by the government of Uttar Pradesh and in November 1988, Ameeta Modi, Singh and another politician, Akhilesh Kumar Singh, were charged with conspiracy to commit murder. Four others were charged with the murder itself. Subsequently, Modi, Sanjay Singh and Akilesh Singh successfully challenged the charges laid against them, resulting in the charges against Modi and Sanjay Singh being dropped in September 1990 and those against Akilesh Singh following the same course in 1996. The Supreme Court upheld the rulings of the lower courts.

== Political career ==
Singh contested the 2017 Uttar Pradesh Assembly election as a Bharatiya Janata Party candidate and defeated her nearest competitor, Gayatri Prasad from the Samajwadi Party, with a margin of 5,065 votes. Another contestant in that election was Ameeta Singh, who stood as an Indian National Congress candidate. The BJP hoped to win the seat by exploiting local sympathy for Garima, who is a relative of V. P. Singh, a former Prime Minister of India. Both women named Sanjay Singh as their spouse in their election affidavits. BJP spokespeople claimed the result was indeed one based on the electorate's feelings about the long-running family drama.

== Movie and TV Series ==
Actor and director Dev Anand made a thriller movie based on the murder of Syed Modi. Sau Crore was released in 1991 with the role of Modi being played by Raman Kapoor. The movie was a surprise hit at the box office.

A 2020 ZEE5 web series The Chargesheet: Innocent or Guilty is based on the sensational murder of Syed Modi, though it does not officially acknowledge so, where the characters of Table Tennis player Shiraz Malik, his wife Antara Dixit, politician Ranveer Pratap Singh and his wife Chitrangada Singh prime-facie very apparently resemble Badminton player Syed Modi, his wife Amita Singh, then Amita Modi, Sanjay Sinh and his wife Garima Singh.
