= Kury =

Kury or KURY may refer to:

== People ==
- Adam Kury (born 1969), American bassist and vocalist
- Franklin Kury (born 1936), American politician based in Pennsylvania
- Johan Kury (born 2001), Rwandan footballer
- Julyana Kury (born 1983), a Brazilian swimmer
- Michael Kury (born 1978), Austrian ski jumper

== Other uses ==
- Kury, Masovian Voivodeship, a village in Poland
- Kury (band), a Polish rock group
- KURY (AM), a radio station (910 AM) licensed to Brookings, Oregon, U.S.
- KURY-FM, a radio station (95.3 FM) licensed to Brookings, Oregon, U.S.

== See also ==
- Kuri (disambiguation)
- Khouri, or Khoury, a surname
