= Amethi Lok Sabha constituency =

Lok Sabha Constituency in Uttar Pradesh, India

Coordinates: 26.16°N 81.81°E

Amethi UP-37
- Lok Sabha constituency
- Interactive Map Outlining Amethi Lok Sabha constituency

Constituency details
- Country: India
- Region: North India
- State: Uttar Pradesh
- Assembly constituencies: Tiloi; Salon; Jagdishpur; Gauriganj; Amethi
- Established: 1967
- Reservation: None

Member of Parliament
- 18th Lok Sabha
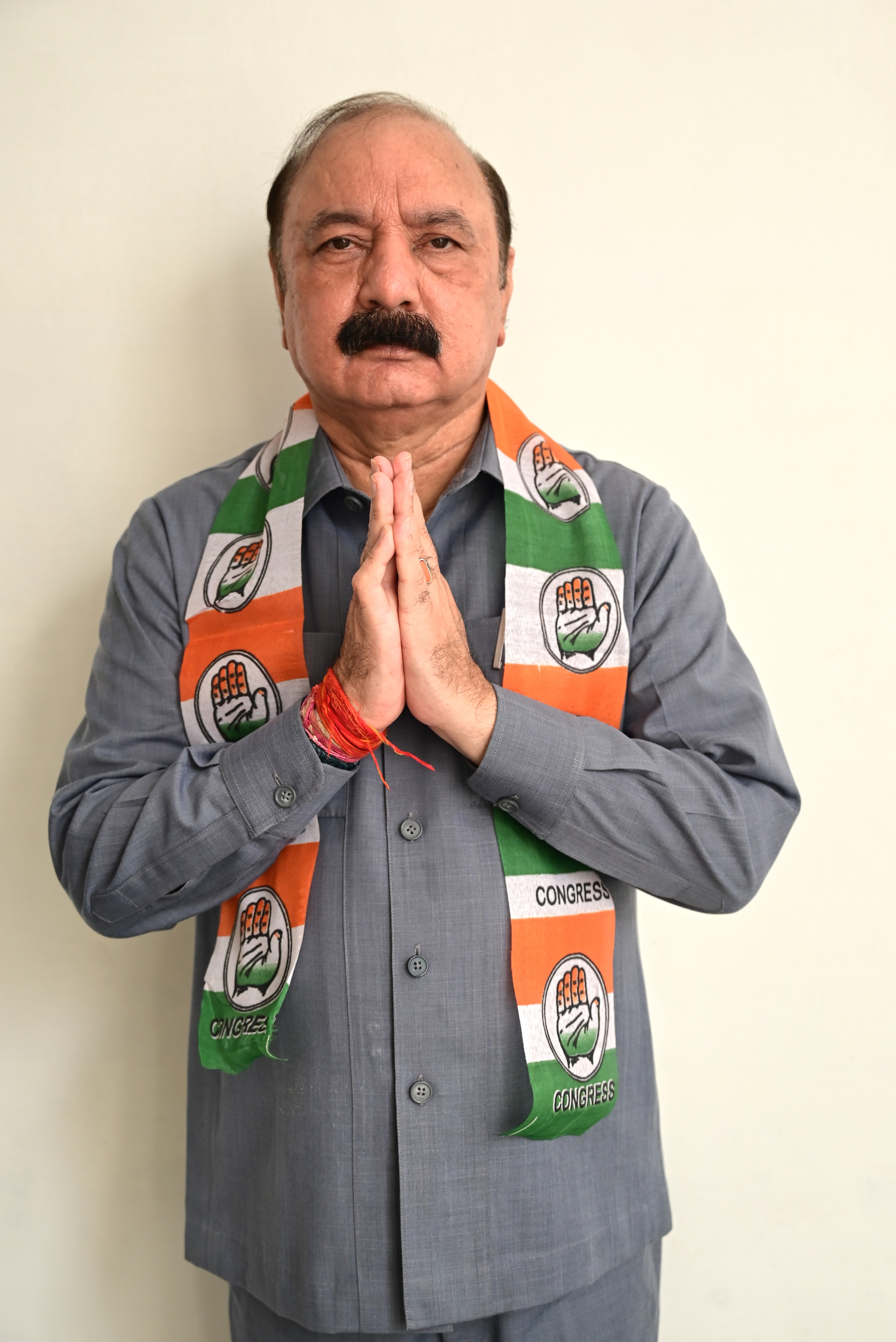
- Incumbent Kishori Lal Sharma
- Party: Indian National Congress
- Elected year: 2024

Amethi is one of the 80 Lok Sabha (lower house of the Indian parliament) constituencies in the Indian state of Uttar Pradesh. This constituency covers the entire Amethi district and was created in 1967. Like its neighbouring constituency Rae Bareli, it is considered to be a bastion of the Indian National Congress. Its first member of parliament (MP) was Vidya Dhar Bajpai of the Indian National Congress (INC) who was elected in 1967 and held his seat in the next election in 1971. In the 1977 election, Ravindra Pratap Singh of the Janata Party became its MP. Singh was defeated in 1980 by Sanjay Gandhi of the INC. Later the same year, Gandhi died in a plane crash. This forced a by election in 1981 which was won by his brother, Rajiv Gandhi. Gandhi went on to represent this constituency until 1991, when he was assassinated by the Liberation Tigers of Tamil Eelam (LTTE). The subsequent by election held the same year was won by Satish Sharma of the INC. Sharma was re-elected in 1996. Sanjaya Sinh of the Bharatiya Janata Party (BJP) defeated Sharma in the 1998 election. The widow of Rajiv Gandhi, Sonia Gandhi represented this constituency from 1999 to 2004. Her son, Rahul Gandhi, was elected in 2004. He was the fourth MP from the Nehru–Gandhi family since 1980 to represent the seat. Gandhi held the seat till the 2019 election when he was defeated by a margin of 55,000 votes by the BJP's Smriti Irani. Irani was defeated in 2024 by a margin of over 1.67 lakh votes by Kishori Lal Sharma of the Indian National Congress.

Most Successful parties from Amethi Lok Sabha
1. INC (14 Times) (82.3%)
2. BJP (2 Times) (11.8%)
3. Janata Party (1 time) (5.88%)

== Vidhan Sabha segments ==
Presently, Amethi Lok Sabha constituency comprises five Vidhan Sabha (legislative assembly) segments: Tiloi, Salon, Jagdishpur, Gauriganj and Amethi. This constituency is surrounded by Bara Banki and Faizabad in the north, Rae Bareli to the west, Sultanpur to the east and Pratapgarh to the south.

No	Name	District	Member	Party	2024 Lead
178	Tiloi	Amethi	Mayankeshwar Sharan Singh	BJP	INC
181	Salon (SC)	Raebareli	Ashok Kori	BJP	INC
184	Jagdishpur (SC)	Amethi	Suresh Pasi	BJP	INC
185	Gauriganj	Amethi	Rakesh Pratap Singh	IND	INC
186	Amethi	Amethi	Maharaji Prajapati	SP	INC

== Members of Parliament ==
Year	Member	Party
1967	Vidya Dhar Bajpai	Indian National Congress
1971	Vidya Dhar Bajpai	Indian National Congress
1977	Ravindra Pratap Singh	Janata Party
1980	Sanjay Gandhi	Indian National Congress
1981^	Rajiv Gandhi	Indian National Congress
1984	Rajiv Gandhi	Indian National Congress
1989	Rajiv Gandhi	Indian National Congress
1991	Rajiv Gandhi	Indian National Congress
1991^	Satish Sharma	Indian National Congress
1996	Satish Sharma	Indian National Congress
1998	Sanjaya Sinh	Bharatiya Janata Party
1999	Sonia Gandhi	Indian National Congress
2004	Rahul Gandhi	Indian National Congress
2009	Rahul Gandhi	Indian National Congress
2014	Rahul Gandhi	Indian National Congress
2019	Smriti Irani	Bharatiya Janata Party
2024	Kishori Lal Sharma	Indian National Congress

== Election results ==
Vote share of Winning candidates
2024	54.99%
2019	49.71%
2014	46.72%
2009	71.78%
2004	66.18%
1999	67.12%
1998	35.08%
1996	38.81%
1991 (By-Poll)	53.88%
1991	53.23%
1989	67.43%
1984	83.67%
1981 (By-Poll)	84.18%
1980	57.11%
1977	60.47%
1971	62.13%
1967	35.81%

=== 2024 ===
Kishori Lal Sharma from the INC won in the 18th Lok Sabha defeating the Union Minister Smriti Irani

2024 Indian general election: Amethi
Party	Candidate	Votes	%	±%
INC	Kishori Lal Sharma	539,228	54.99	▲11.13
BJP	Smriti Irani	372,032	37.94	▼11.77
BSP	Nanhe Singh Chauhan	34,534	3.52	
NOTA	None of the Above	9,383	0.96	▲0.54
IND	5 Independent Candidates	14,716	1.50	
OTH	5 Other Party Candidates	10,778	1.10	
Majority		167,196	17.05	▲11.20
Turnout		980,671	54.60	▲0.52
INC gain from BJP		Swing		

=== 2019 ===
2019 Indian general election: Amethi
Party	Candidate	Votes	%	±%
BJP	Smriti Irani	468,514	49.71	▲15.32
INC	Rahul Gandhi	413,394	43.86	▼2.86
NOTA	None of the Above	3,940	0.42	▲0.22
IND	14 Independent Candidates	35,406	3.76	
OTH	11 Other Party Candidates	21,199	2.25	
Majority		55,120	5.85	▼6.48
Turnout		942,956	54.08	▲1.69
BJP gain from INC		Swing		

=== 2014 ===
2014 Indian general election: Amethi
Party	Candidate	Votes	%	±%
INC	Rahul Gandhi	408,651	46.72	▼25.06
BJP	Smriti Irani	300,748	34.39	▲28.58
BSP	Dharmendra Pratap Singh	57,716	6.60	▼7.94
AAP	Kumar Vishwas	25,527	2.92	
NOTA	None of the Above	1,784	0.20	
IND	17 Independent Candidates	44,563	5.10	
OTH	13 Other Party Candidates	35,636	4.07	
Majority		107,903	12.33	▼44.91
Turnout		874,872	52.39	▲7.23
INC hold		Swing		

=== 2009 ===
2009 Indian general election: Amethi
Party	Candidate	Votes	%	±%
INC	Rahul Gandhi	464,191	71.78	▲5.60
BSP	Asheesh Shukla	93,997	14.54	▼2.31
BJP	Pradeep Kumar Singh	37,566	5.81	▼3.59
IND	9 Independent Candidates	33,497	5.18	
OTH	4 Other Party Candidates	17,391	2.69	
Majority		370,194	57.24	▲7.91
Turnout		646,650	45.16	▲0.66
INC hold		Swing		

=== 2004 ===
Rahul Gandhi, Sonia Gandhi's son, won the seat and represented the constituency in the Fourteenth Lok Sabha.

2004 Indian general election: Amethi
Party	Candidate	Votes	%	±%
INC	Rahul Gandhi	390,179	66.18	▼0.94
BSP	Chandra Parkash Mishra	99,326	16.85	▲11.46
BJP	Ram Vilas Vedanti	55,438	9.40	▼9.66
IND	7 Independent Candidates	30,144	5.11	
OTH	2 Other Party Candidates	14,509	2.46	
Majority		290,853	49.33	▲1.27
Turnout		589,596	44.50	▼12.96
INC hold		Swing		

=== 1999 ===
Sonia Gandhi, the wife of Rajiv Gandhi, won the election and represented the constituency in the Thirteenth Lok Sabha.

1999 Indian general election: Amethi
Party	Candidate	Votes	%	±%
INC	Sonia Gandhi	418,960	67.12	▲36.02
BJP	Sanjay Singh	118,948	19.06	▼16.02
BSP	Paras Nath Maurya	33,658	5.39	▼20.46
SP	Qamar-uz-zaman Khan	16,678	2.67	▼2.44
IND	20 Independent Candidates	31,893	5.13	
OTH	3 Other Party Candidates	4,035	0.64	
Majority		300,012	48.06	▲44.08
Turnout		638,178	57.46	▲3.73
INC gain from BJP		Swing		

=== 1998 ===
Sanjaya Sinh of the BJP won the election and represented the constituency in the Twelfth Lok Sabha.

1998 Indian general election: Amethi
Party	Candidate	Votes	%	±%
BJP	Sanjay Singh	205,025	35.08	▲6.14
INC	Satish Sharma	181,755	31.10	▼7.71
BSP	Mohammad Naeem	151,096	25.85	▲6.36
SP	Shiv Prasad Yadav	29,888	5.11	
AD	Chote Lal Maurya	3,946	0.68	▼0.06
IND	8 Independent Candidates	12,798	2.21	
Majority		23,270	3.98	▼5.89
Turnout		597,556	53.73	▲15.02
BJP gain from INC		Swing		

=== 1996 ===
1996 Indian general election: Amethi
Party	Candidate	Votes	%	±%
INC	Satish Sharma	157,868	38.81	▼15.07
BJP	Raja Mohan Singh	117,725	28.94	▲4.95
BSP	Choudary Mohd. Isa	79,285	19.49	
IND	Karnandan Singh Akela	13,277	3.26	
AD	Vishweswar Patel	2,996	0.74	
AIIC(T)	Shivnarayan Mishra	1,606	0.39	
IND	41 Independent Candidates	34,042	8.40	
Majority		40,143	9.87	▼20.02
Turnout		426,913	38.71	
INC hold		Swing		

=== 1991 by-election ===
Satish Sharma of the INC won the election and represented the constituency in the Tenth Lok Sabha.

1991 By-election: Amethi
Party	Candidate	Votes	%	±%
INC	Satish Sharma	178,996	53.88	▲0.65
BJP	M. M. Singh	79,687	23.99	▲2.64
IND	R. Singh	47,033	14.16	
Margin of victory		99,309	29.89	▼1.99
Turnout		332,195		
INC hold		Swing	+0.65	

=== 1991 ===
Rajiv Gandhi won the election, but he was assassinated on 21 May 1991 a few days after the polling in Amethi and even before other rounds of polling were completed. The election process was postponed for a few days and votes were eventually counted in June 1991. He was declared winner after his death, but a bye-election had to be called.

1991 Indian general election: Amethi
Party	Candidate	Votes	%	±%
INC	Rajiv Gandhi	187,138	53.23	▼14.20
BJP	Ravindra Pratap Singh	75,053	21.35	
JD	Mohammad Naeem	54,680	15.55	▼1.66
DDP	Ram Samujh Singh	742	0.21	
IND	38 Independent Candidates	33,935	9.66	
Majority		112,085	31.88	▼18.34
Turnout		376,202	40.97	▼5.81
INC hold		Swing		

=== 1989 ===
Rajiv Gandhi won a third term in the election and represented the constituency in the Ninth Lok Sabha. He was challenged by Rajmohan Gandhi, grandson of Mahatma Gandhi.

1989 Indian general election: Amethi
Party	Candidate	Votes	%	±%
INC	Rajiv Gandhi	271,407	67.43	▼16.24
JD	Rajmohan Gandhi	69,269	17.21	
BSP	Kanshi Ram	25,400	6.31	
IND	42 Independent Candidates	32,684	8.13	
OTH	2 Other Party Candidates	3,740	0.93	
Majority		202,138	50.22	▼21.95
Turnout		425,746	46.78	▼13.47
INC hold		Swing		

=== 1984 ===
Rajiv Gandhi held the seat and represented the constituency in the Eighth Lok Sabha. He defeated his sister-in-law Maneka Gandhi by a margin of 314,878 votes or 72.17%, the highest till now for a sitting prime minister.

1984 Indian general election: Amethi
Party	Candidate	Votes	%	±%
INC	Rajiv Gandhi	365,041	83.67	▼0.51
IND	Maneka Gandhi	50,163	11.50	
DDP	Kunwar Brijesh Singh	2,002	0.46	
IND	28 Independent Candidates	19,057	4.37	
Majority		314,878	72.17	▼5.12
Turnout		446,289	60.25	
INC hold		Swing		

=== 1981 by-election ===
Rajiv Gandhi, Sanjay's brother, won the by-election and represented the constituency in the Seventh Lok Sabha.

1981 By-election: Amethi
Party	Candidate	Votes	%	±%
INC	Rajiv Gandhi	258,884	84.18	▲27.07
LKD	Sharad Yadav	21,188	6.89	
Margin of victory		237,696	77.29	▲38.03
Turnout		307,523		
INC hold		Swing		

=== 1980 ===
Sanjay Gandhi of the INC won the election. He died in a plane crash later in the year, forcing a by-election in 1981.

1980 Indian general election: Amethi
Party	Candidate	Votes	%	±%
INC(I)	Sanjay Gandhi	186,990	57.11	▲22.64
JP	Ravindra Pratap Singh	58,445	17.85	▼42.62
JP(S)	Mohammad Isa	41,734	12.75	
IND	Mahavir Prasad	12,295	3.76	
IND	Satya Narain Jaiswal	7,339	2.24	
IND	Ram Dulare Yadav	5,320	1.62	
IND	Chodhari Mohd. Halim Biriwala	3,311	1.01	
IND	Munna Jaiswal	3,048	0.93	
IND	Tarkeshwar Prasad	2,743	0.84	
IND	Babu Lal Yadav	2,464	0.75	
IND	Abdul Majid	1,969	0.60	
IND	Paras Nath Gupta	1,755	0.54	
Majority		128,545	39.26	▲13.26
Turnout		338,531	50.10	▲1.51
INC(I) gain from JP		Swing		

=== 1977 ===
1977 Indian general election: Amethi
Party	Candidate	Votes	%	±%
JP	Ravindra Pratap Singh	176,410	60.47	
INC	Sanjay Gandhi	100,566	34.47	▼27.66
IND	Abdul Wahid	8,450	2.90	
IND	Badri Narain	6,306	2.16	
Majority		75,844	26.00	▼22.37
Turnout		302,826	48.59	▲18.54
JP gain from INC		Swing		

=== 1971 ===
1971 Indian general election: Amethi
Party	Candidate	Votes	%	±%
INC	Vidya Dhar Bajpai	96,312	62.13	▲26.32
ABJS	Gokul Prasad Pathak	21,335	13.76	▼19.98
INC(O)	Syed Wasi Naqvi	19,051	12.29	
BKD	Kailash Nath Singh	11,787	7.60	
RRP	Basudev Shashtri	6,541	4.22	
Majority		74,977	48.37	▲46.30
Turnout		160,395	30.05	▼7.29
INC hold		Swing		

=== 1967 ===
1967 Indian general election: Amethi
Party	Candidate	Votes	%	±%
INC	Vidya Dhar Bajpai	63,231	35.81	
ABJS	Gokul Prasad Pathak	59,566	33.74	
IND	Abdul Wahid	22,333	12.65	
SSP	A. P. Pandey	17,213	9.75	
SWA	R. H. Singh	9,883	5.60	
IND	V. Jhunjhunwala	4,334	2.45	
Majority		3,665	2.07	
Turnout		188,666	37.34	
INC win (new seat)				

== See also ==
- List of constituencies of the Lok Sabha

Lok Sabha
Preceded by Medak	Constituency represented by the prime minister 1984-1989	Succeeded by Fatehpur
Vacant since 1979; No Official opposition Title last held by Sasaram	Constituency represented by the leader of the opposition 1989 – 1990	Succeeded by New Delhi
Preceded by Baramati	Constituency represented by the leader of the opposition 1999 – 2004	Succeeded by Gandhinagar
