= Murder of Syed Modi =

Murder in 1988 of Indian badminton player

- Location: K. D. Singh Babu Stadium, Lucknow, India
- Date: 28 July 1988
- Attack type: Murder
- Victim: 1
- Accused: 7
- Charges: Murder, possessing illegal arms
- Convicted: 1

On 28 July 1988, Syed Modi (31 December 1962 – 28 July 1988), an Indian badminton singles player and eight-time National Badminton champion (1980–1987), was shot dead in Lucknow while exiting the K. D. Singh Babu Stadium after a practice session.

His murder sent shockwaves through India, especially after the police filed murder charges against Modi's wife, Ameeta Singh, and her alleged lover, Sanjaya Sinh; ultimately, the charges were dropped for lack of evidence. Of seven suspects initially charged in connection with the murder, one man was convicted in 2009 and sentenced to life in prison.

== Background ==
Modi was considered to be an emerging badminton star, with comparisons made to Prakash Padukone. His death occurred two months after his wife, Ameeta, gave birth to their daughter. At the time of his death, the couple were considering moving to Mumbai, as Ameeta sought to resume her badminton career.

Syed Modi was employed at North Eastern Railways. In January 1988, he was told he would be transferred from Lucknow to Gorakhpur; Modi opposed this transfer, and the transfer was revoked following a meeting with Minister of State for Railways Madhav Rao Scindia in May.

== Murder ==
On the evening of 28 July 1988, at the age of 25, Modi was shot dead as he was coming out of KD Singh Babu Stadium, Lucknow after a routine practice. Modi was attacked by two assailants while riding his scooter through the stadium gate, and was shot five times by a Colt .38 revolver. Although multiple witnesses saw the attack, they were unable to apprehend the assailants before they escaped.

== Investigation ==
An FIR was registered the same night at Police Station Hazratganj against two unknown assailants. The investigation was soon taken over by the Central Bureau of Investigation (CBI). Initially, the Central Bureau of Investigation struggled to find leads, especially since Modi had no publicly known enemies. Due to the nature of the attack, they theorised that the assailants had been hired professional assassins. A theory that Modi's death was connected to work disagreements was briefly considered, but ultimately discarded.

After investigation CBI named seven persons, as being behind Modi's murder or being part of a larger conspiracy: Sanjay Singh, Ameeta Kulkarni Modi, politician Akhilesh Kumar Singh, Amar Bahadur Singh, Bhagwati Singh (alias Pappu), Jitendra Singh (alias Tinku) and Balai Singh . Amar Bahadur Singh, Pappu, Tinku, and Balai Singh were said to belong to Akhilesh Kumar Singh's gang, who had a criminal record and involved in a number of crimes.

The scandal surrounding Modi's murder attracted worldwide attention.

On 3 September, the CBI arrested Sanjaya Sinh on charges of conspiracy to murder, working under the “love triangle” theory that Sinh and Ameeta had been involved in an extramarital affair. Ameeta was arrested on 5 September. On 13 September, the CBI arrested five men who they said had been involved with the plot. The evidence included alleged excerpts from Ameeta's diary (Ameeta challenged their veracity), letters written by Ameeta's mother regarding the paternity of Aakanksha, letters written during the engagement of Syed Modi and Ameeta in 1984, and a later letter where Syed Modi threatened to commit suicide.

The CBI claimed extramarital relation between Sanjay Singh and Ameeta as being the main cause of murder. It said- "Infatuation of Sanjay Singh for Ameeta increased as time passed. Within Lucknow he would ring her up some time ten times a day; coming to Ameeta often twice at night to seek sexual gratification with her consent." As per CBI- "Sanjay Singh spent thousands of rupees to phone Ameeta from all over India. Syed Modi, the deceased resented this relationship. he suspected the infatuation of Sanjay Singh for his wife Ameeta and her most willing participation. They had frequent quarrels over this issue. Ameeta Modi wrote passionate love letters to Sanjay Singh."

CBI also presented the events and sequence of conspiracy that allegedly took place between these conspirators. Bhagwati Singh, Amar Bahadur Singh and Balai Singh, using Maruti Van No.HYG 1959, were said to be actual shooters. During investigation, Akhilesh Singh and Jitendera Singh admitted their alleged crimes.

On 17 September 1990, the Court of Sessions Lucknow discharged Sanjaya Sinh and Ameeta saying that the material on record does not, prima facie, establish any physical manifestation on the part of Ameeta in any part of the conspiracy, while also saying that on the basis of the entire facts, circumstances and the material before Court, it does not appear that Sanjaya Sinh can reasonably be connected with the murder. This order was upheld by the Allahabad High Court and the Supreme Court, which said- "The circumstantial evidence even if accepted in its entirety, as pointed out by the courts below creates only a suspicion of motive."

Balai Singh and Amar Bahadur Singh were murdered between 1992 and 1994.

Accused Akhilesh Singh filed a petition before the Allahabad High Court, which quashed the charges framed against him by Session Court and he was discharged in 1996.The Supreme Court upheld this decision in 2004, saying that once Sanjaya Sinh, who was alleged to have hatched the conspiracy and who had the motive to kill Modi, was discharged, no purpose was served in further proceeding against Akhilesh Singh.

During trial, the eyewitness identified the accused Bhagwati Singh (alias Pappu) and not Jitendra Singh (alias Tinku). Bhagwati Singh was convicted for murder by Session Court Lucknow in August 2009. In 2022, the Allahabad High Court upheld this order of conviction.

== Aftermath ==
Later Modi's widow, Ameeta, married Sanjay Sinh. This marriage received sensational reportage in the press and became front-page news in India.

The case continues to linger in public memory.
