= 1981 Uber Cup qualification =

Tournament details
- Dates: 28 October 1980 – 4 April 1981
- Location: American zone: Lima; Quebec City European zone: Dunfermline; Helsingborg; Örnsköldsvik; Redbridge; Sunderland Australasian zone: Jakarta

The qualifying process for the 1981 Uber Cup took place from 28 October 1980 to 4 April 1981 to decide the final teams which will play in the final tournament.

== Qualification process ==
The qualification process is divided into four regions, the Asian Zone, the American Zone, the European Zone and the Australasian Zone. Teams in their respective zone will compete in a knockout format. Three singles and four doubles will be played on the day of competition. The teams that win their respective zone will earn a place in the final tournament to be held in Tokyo.

The winners of the 1978 Uber Cup, Japan were exempted from the qualifying rounds and automatically qualified for the final tournament. Malaysia also advanced to the final tournament as they were the only representatives in the Asian zone.

=== Qualified teams ===
Country	Qualified as	Qualified on	Final appearance
Japan	1978 Uber Cup winners	20 May 1978	5th
Malaysia	Sole representative of the Asian Zone	5 March 1980	2nd
England	European Zone winners	4 April 1981	5th
Canada	American Zone winners	22 February 1981	6th
Indonesia	Australasian Zone winners	31 October 1980	7th

== American Zone ==
=== Bracket ===
Semi-finals
7 December 1980 – Lima
United States	9
Peru	0
Canada
Bye

Final
21 February 1981 – Quebec City
United States	1
Canada	8

=== Semi-finals ===
United States
9
Lima, Peru
7–8 December 1980

Peru
0

			1	2	3
1	(United States) (Peru)	Cheryl Carton; Ofelia de Telge	11; 1	11; 1
2	(United States) (Peru)	Utami Kinard; Gloria Jiménez	11; 5	11; 2
3	(United States) (Peru)	Pam Bristol Brady / Judianne Kelly; Josefina de Salazar / Luisa Villavicencio	7; 15	15; 9	15; 5
4	(United States) (Peru)	Cheryl Carton / Utami Kinard; Ofelia de Telge / Gloria Jiménez	15; 3	15; 10
5	(United States) (Peru)	Cheryl Carton; Gloria Jiménez	6; 11	11; 3	11; 4
6	(United States) (Peru)	Utami Kinard; Ofelia de Telge	11; 4	11; 0
7	(United States) (Peru)	Judianne Kelly; Josefina de Salazar	11; 8	11; 1
8	(United States) (Peru)	Cheryl Carton / Utami Kinard; Josefina de Salazar / Luisa Villavicencio	11; 15	15; 3	15; 9
9	(United States) (Peru)	Pam Bristol Brady / Judianne Kelly; Ofelia de Telge / Gloria Jiménez	15; 1	15; 6

=== Final ===
Canada
8
Quebec City, Canada
21–22 February 1981

United States
1

			1	2	3
1	(Canada) (United States)	Jane Youngberg; Alison Root	11; 0	11; 3
2	(Canada) (United States)	Wendy Carter; Cheryl Carton	10; 12	12; 10	11; 6
3	(Canada) (United States)	Linda Cloutier / Johanne Falardeau; Traci Britton / Vicki Toutz	15; 5	15; 5
4	(Canada) (United States)	Denyse Julien / Jane Youngberg; Pam Bristol Brady / Judianne Kelly	18; 17	9; 15	6; 15
5	(Canada) (United States)	Jane Youngberg; Cheryl Carton	11; 2	11; 4
6	(Canada) (United States)	Sandra Skillings; Judianne Kelly	11; 2	6; 11	12; 10
7	(Canada) (United States)	Wendy Carter; Alison Root	11; 6	11; 8
8	(Canada) (United States)	Denyse Julien / Jane Youngberg; Traci Britton / Vicki Toutz	13; 15	15; 10	15; 3
9	(Canada) (United States)	Linda Cloutier / Johanne Falardeau; Pam Bristol Brady / Judianne Kelly	9; 15	15; 13	15; 11

== European Zone ==
=== Bracket ===
First round
18 November 1980 – Örnsköldsvik
Netherlands	4
Sweden	5
Denmark
Bye
26 November 1980 – Dunfermline
Scotland	2
Taiwan	7
England
Bye

Semi-finals
14 January 1981 – Helsingborg
Sweden	1
Denmark	8
2 December 1980 – Sunderland
Taiwan	0
England	9

Final
3 April 1981 – Redbridge
Denmark	4
England	5

=== First round ===
Netherlands
4
Örnsköldsvik, Sweden
18–19 November 1980

Sweden
5

			1	2	3
1	(Netherlands) (Sweden)	Joke van Beusekom; Anette Börjesson	10; 12	2; 11
2	(Netherlands) (Sweden)	Marjan Ridder; Lena Axelsson	7; 11	9; 11
3	(Netherlands) (Sweden)	Hanke de Kort / Joke van Beusekom; Maria Bengtsson / Anette Börjesson	17; 18	15; 9	9; 15
4	(Netherlands) (Sweden)	Karin Duyvestein / Marjan Ridder; Karin Lindquist / Christine Magnusson	15; 7	15; 7
5	(Netherlands) (Sweden)	Joke van Beusekom; Lena Axelsson	7; 11	11; 4	11; 4
6	(Netherlands) (Sweden)	Hanke de Kort; Christine Magnusson	11; 9	3; 11	11; 9
7	(Netherlands) (Sweden)	Marjan Ridder; Anette Börjesson	9; 11	6; 11
8	(Netherlands) (Sweden)	Hanke de Kort / Joke van Beusekom; Karin Lindquist / Christine Magnusson	15; 10	18; 14
9	(Netherlands) (Sweden)	Karin Duyvestein / Marjan Ridder; Maria Bengtsson / Anette Börjesson	18; 16	12; 15	10; 15

Taiwan
7
Dunfermline, Scotland
26 November 1980

Scotland
2

			1	2	3
1	(Taiwan) (Scotland)	Liu Hsiu-ying; Alison Fulton	11; 9	5; 11	11; 1
2	(Taiwan) (Scotland)	Chen Yu-jen; Pamela Hamilton	11; 3	11; 6
3	(Taiwan) (Scotland)	Huang Hsiu-chih / Liu Hsiu-ying; Joanne Flockhart / Alison Fulton	15; 10	15; 12
4	(Taiwan) (Scotland)	Chen Yu-jen / Lai Tzwu; Pamela Hamilton / Linda Gardner	4; 15	15; 10	12; 15
5	(Taiwan) (Scotland)	Liu Hsiu-ying; Pamela Hamilton	0; 11	12; 9	3; 3
6	(Taiwan) (Scotland)	Chen Yu-jen; Alison Fulton	11; 7	11; 6
7	(Taiwan) (Scotland)	Huang Hsiu-chih; Joy Rumgay	8; 11	11; 7	11; 5
8	(Taiwan) (Scotland)	Huang Hsiu-chih / Liu Hsiu-ying; Pamela Hamilton / Linda Gardner	15; 12	15; 12
9	(Taiwan) (Scotland)	Chen Yu-jen / Lai Tzwu; Christine Heatly / Joanne Flockhart	7; 15	9; 15

=== Semi-finals ===
England
9
Sunderland, England
2 December 1980

Taiwan
0

			1	2	3
1	(England) (Taiwan)	Karen Bridge; Liu Hsiu-ying	11; 3	11; 2
2	(England) (Taiwan)	Jane Webster; Chen Yu-jen	11; 5	11; 4
3	(England) (Taiwan)	Nora Perry / Jane Webster; Huang Hsiu-chih / Liu Hsiu-ying	15; 10	15; 2
4	(England) (Taiwan)	Karen Bridge / Barbara Sutton; Chen Yu-jen / Lai Tzwu	15; 11	15; 4
5	(England) (Taiwan)	Karen Bridge; Chen Yu-jen	11; 2	11; 8
6	(England) (Taiwan)	Jane Webster; Liu Hsiu-ying	11; 4	11; 2
7	(England) (Taiwan)	Sally Leadbeater; Huang Hsiu-chih	11; 7	11; 2
8	(England) (Taiwan)	Nora Perry / Jane Webster; Chen Yu-jen / Lai Tzwu	15; 0	15; 2
9	(England) (Taiwan)	Karen Bridge / Barbara Sutton; Huang Hsiu-chih / Liu Hsiu-ying	15; 9	15; 6

Denmark
8
Helsingborg, Sweden
14–15 January 1981

Sweden
1

			1	2	3
1	(Denmark) (Sweden)	Lene Køppen; Anette Börjesson	11; 2	11; 0
2	(Denmark) (Sweden)	Rikke von Sørensen; Lena Axelsson	11; 8	11; 5
3	(Denmark) (Sweden)	Lene Køppen / Anne Skovgaard; Maria Bengtsson / Anette Börjesson	15; 2	15; 13
4	(Denmark) (Sweden)	Susanne Berg / Kirsten Meier; Karin Lindquist / Christine Magnusson	15; 12	12; 15	15; 5
5	(Denmark) (Sweden)	Rikke von Sørensen; Anette Börjesson	12; 9	11; 5
6	(Denmark) (Sweden)	Lene Køppen; Lena Axelsson	11; 1	11; 2
7	(Denmark) (Sweden)	Susanne Ejlersen; Christine Magnusson	11; 7	4; 11	11; 8
8	(Denmark) (Sweden)	Lene Køppen / Anne Skovgaard; Karin Lindquist / Christine Magnusson	15; 8	15; 6
9	(Denmark) (Sweden)	Susanne Berg / Kirsten Meier; Maria Bengtsson / Anette Börjesson	6; 15	18; 17	14; 18

=== Final ===
Denmark
4
Redbridge, England
3–4 April 1981

England
5

			1	2	3
1	(Denmark) (England)	Lene Køppen; Jane Webster	11; 5	11; 4
2	(Denmark) (England)	Kirsten Larsen; Sally Leadbeater	2; 11	5; 11
3	(Denmark) (England)	Lene Køppen / Anne Skovgaard; Karen Bridge / Barbara Sutton	15; 1	8; 15	15; 2
4	(Denmark) (England)	Dorte Kjær / Nettie Nielsen; Nora Perry / Jane Webster	3; 15	6; 15
5	(Denmark) (England)	Kirsten Larsen; Jane Webster	5; 11	2; 11
6	(Denmark) (England)	Lene Køppen; Sally Leadbeater	11; 0	11; 1
7	(Denmark) (England)	Rikke von Sørensen; Karen Bridge	11; 9	9; 11	11; 3
8	(Denmark) (England)	Lene Køppen / Anne Skovgaard; Nora Perry / Jane Webster	5; 15	13; 15
9	(Denmark) (England)	Dorte Kjær / Nettie Nielsen; Karen Bridge / Barbara Sutton	16; 18	17; 16	6; 15

== Australasian Zone ==
=== Bracket ===
Semi-finals
28 October 1980 – Jakarta
Indonesia	9
New Zealand	0
28 October 1980 – Jakarta
Australia	3
India	6

Final
21 February 1981 – Jakarta
Indonesia	9
India	0

=== Semi-finals ===
Indonesia
9
Jakarta, Indonesia
28–29 October 1980

New Zealand
0

			1	2	3
1	(Indonesia) (New Zealand)	Ivana Lie; Toni Whittaker	11; 0	11; 2
2	(Indonesia) (New Zealand)	Taty Sumirah; Karen Phillips	5; 0	4; 3
3	(Indonesia) (New Zealand)	Imelda Wiguna / Verawaty Wiharjo; Allison Sinton / Toni Whittaker	15; 5	15; 1
4	(Indonesia) (New Zealand)	Ivana Lie / Theresia Widiastuti; Mary Livingston / Lindsey Shirley	15; 2	15; 7
5	(Indonesia) (New Zealand)	Taty Sumirah; Toni Whittaker	11; 1	11; 0
6	(Indonesia) (New Zealand)	Ivana Lie; Karen Phillips	11; 4	11; 2
7	(Indonesia) (New Zealand)	Maria Fransisca; Allison Sinton	11; 1	11; 2
8	(Indonesia) (New Zealand)	Imelda Wiguna / Verawaty Wiharjo; Mary Livingston / Lindsey Shirley	15; 1	15; 3
9	(Indonesia) (New Zealand)	Ivana Lie / Theresia Widiastuti; Allison Sinton / Toni Whittaker	15; 2	15; 4

Australia
3
Jakarta, Indonesia
28–29 October 1980

India
6

			1	2	3
1	(Australia) (India)	Sue Daly; Ami Ghia	4; 11	12; 10	11; 12
2	(Australia) (India)	Julie McDonald; Amita Kulkarni	4; 11	12; 11	11; 7
3	(Australia) (India)	Robyn Hobba / Audrey Swaby; Ami Ghia / Kanwal Thakar Singh	8; 15	9; 15
4	(Australia) (India)	Geraldine Brown / Julie McDonald; Madhumita Goswami / Hufrish Nariman	15; 7	15; 9
5	(Australia) (India)	Audrey Swaby; Madhumita Goswami	11; 6	3; 11	5; 11
6	(Australia) (India)	Julie McDonald; Ami Ghia	7; 11	4; 11
7	(Australia) (India)	Sue Daly; Amita Kulkarni	11; 3	5; 11	2; 11
8	(Australia) (India)	Robyn Hobba / Audrey Swaby; Madhumita Goswami / Hufrish Nariman	15; 6	15; 3
9	(Australia) (India)	Geraldine Brown / Julie McDonald; Ami Ghia / Kanwal Thakar Singh	15; 6	9; 15	15; 18

=== Final ===
Indonesia
9
Jakarta, Indonesia
30–31 October 1980

India
0

			1	2	3
1	(Indonesia) (India)	Verawaty Wiharjo; Ami Ghia	11; 3	11; 2
2	(Indonesia) (India)	Ivana Lie; Amita Kulkarni	11; 6	11; 5
3	(Indonesia) (India)	Imelda Wiguna / Verawaty Wiharjo; Ami Ghia / Kanwal Thakar Singh	15; 1	15; 3
4	(Indonesia) (India)	Ruth Damayanti / Theresia Widiastuti; Madhumita Goswami / Hufrish Nariman	15; 4	15; 1
5	(Indonesia) (India)	Taty Sumirah; Madhumita Goswami	11; 2	11; 2
6	(Indonesia) (India)	Verawaty Wiharjo; Amita Kulkarni	11; 0	11; 1
7	(Indonesia) (India)	Ivana Lie; Ami Ghia	11; 0	11; 6
8	(Indonesia) (India)	Imelda Wiguna / Verawaty Wiharjo; Madhumita Goswami / Hufrish Nariman	15; 0	15; 1
9	(Indonesia) (India)	Ruth Damayanti / Theresia Widiastuti; Ami Ghia / Kanwal Thakar Singh	6; 15	15; 7	15; 2
