= Ameeta Singh =

Indian politician

Member of Legislative Assembly, Uttar Pradesh
- In office 2002–2012
- Succeeded by: Gayatri Prasad Prajapati
- Constituency: Amethi

Personal details
- Born: Ameeta Kulkarni; 4 October 1962 (age 64) Mumbai, Maharashtra, India
- Party: Bharatiya Janata Party
- Other political affiliations: Indian National Congress
- Spouse(s): Syed Modi (m. 1984; died 1988) Sanjay Sinh (m. 1995)
- Occupation: Politician, former national badminton champion, former Education Minister
- Known for: President Delhi Capital Badminton Association, All India Professional Congress, Social work, Vice Chairman RRSGI group of Institutions, Amethi and Bronze medal winner Asian Games 1982

Ameeta Sinh (born Amita Kulkarni on 4 October 1962) is a politician from the state of Uttar Pradesh, India, who was formerly a national badminton champion. She has been Chairman of Jilla Panchayat in Amethi/Sultanpur district and has been elected three times as a Member of the Legislative Assembly for the Amethi Vidhan Sabha constituency in the Legislative Assembly of Uttar Pradesh. She was minister of state in the Government of Uttar Pradesh.

After the murder of her first husband Syed Modi, in whose murder she and her future husband Sanjay Sinh were accused, she went on to marry Sanjay Sinh, a Bhartiya Janta Party (BJP) and Indian National Congress politician, at various times, from Amethi who is close to the Nehru-Gandhi family and a descendant, by adoption, of the former royal family of Amethi.

== Early life ==
Ameeta Sinh was born on 4 October 1962. She became a national champion in the sport of badminton during the 1970s. In 1984, she married another national champion, Syed Modi, whom she then partnered in a successful badminton career. Their marriage ended when Syed Modi was shot dead in 1988. It was at that time that Modi has found out about the relationship between Sanjay Singh and his wife who was now carrying a baby. The duo was arrested for the murder of Modi and it is said that Sanjay Singh used his political influence to full affect. Subsequently, they were discharged of all charges, the CBI alleged that Ameeta and Sanjay were in a relationship, although Sanjay was still married at that time. The coup his first wife, Garima. A legal challenge to that divorce resulted in it being set aside in 1998 by the Supreme Court of India, although the couple still claim that they are legally wed. Aside from the three children whom he fathered with Garima, Sanjay has legally adopted Ameeta's daughter. Her daughter was born two months prior to the death of Syed Modi.

Sinh graduated from Dr. Ram Manohar Lohia Avadh University, Faizabad, in 2003 and was awarded a PhD in sociology by the same institution in 2011.

Ameeta Sinh has been involved in a public inheritance battle, with Sanjay and Garima making rival claims.". Sanjay was adopted by the king of Amethi, Rananjay Singh, as his heir prior to the abolition of all royal privileges in India and as such he inherited the former royal estates. In 1989, he had removed Garima from the palace but in 2014 she and her children took up residence at another palace in Amethi, called Bhupati Bhawan, and refused to move. Local people gathered to support her, claiming that she, rather than Ameeta, was the real queen.

== Political career ==
Sinh was Chairman of Jilla Panchayat of Amethi/Sultanpur district between August 2000 and February 2002. She won the Amethi Vidhan Sabha seat as a Bharatiya Janata Party (BJP) candidate in the 2002 Uttar Pradesh state assembly elections, and again in the 2007 elections, this time as an INC candidate. Her husband had also been a BJP politician at the time of the 2002 elections, having begun his career with the INC, moved to the Janata Dal party and then to the BJP. He had returned to the INC in 2003. She was the state minister with independent charge for technical education in the short-lived Third Mayawati ministry during 2002.

In 2012, Singh stood as an INC candidate in the Amethi constituency during the state legislative assembly elections of that year. She lost to Gayatri Prajapati of the Samajwadi Party. She contested the Sultanpur Lok Sabha constituency as an INC candidate for a seat in the Parliament of India in 2014 but finished third, with the winner being Varun Gandhi of the BJP.

In the 2017 Uttar Pradesh legislative assembly elections, Sinh contested the Amethi constituency as an INC candidate and had Garima Singh as one of her opponents, standing for the BJP. The BJP hoped to win the seat by exploiting local sympathy for Garima, who is a relative of V. P. Singh, a former Prime Minister of India. Both women named Sanjay Singh as their spouse in their election affidavits, and it was Garima who won the contest. BJP spokespeople claimed the result was indeed one based on elector's feelings about the long-running family drama. In July 2019, Ameeta Singh along with her husband Sanjaya Sinh joined Bharatiya Janata Party.

=== Murder of Syed Modi ===
Syed Modi was shot dead on 28 July 1988 in Lucknow. The murder attracted worldwide attention. There were suggestions that Ameeta was involved in a relationship with Singh, who was a close friend of the couple and at whose house they had married. In late August, the Central Bureau of Investigation (CBI) launched a search of Singh's house. The investigation was urged upon the CBI by the government of Uttar Pradesh and in November 1988, Ameeta Modi, Singh and another politician, Akhilesh Kumar Singh, were charged with conspiracy to commit murder. Four others were charged with the murder itself. Subsequently, Modi, Sanjay Singh and Akilesh Singh successfully challenged the charges laid against them, resulting in the charges against Modi and Sanjay Singh being dropped in September 1990 and those against Akilesh Singh following the same course in 1996. The Supreme Court upheld the rulings of the lower courts.

== Movie and TV series ==
Actor and director Dev Anand made a thriller movie based on the murder of Syed Modi. Sau Crore was released in 1991 with the role of Modi being played by Raman Kapoor. The movie was a surprise hit at the box office.

A 2020 ZEE5 web series The Chargesheet: Innocent or Guilty is based on the sensational murder of Syed Modi, though it does not officially acknowledge so, where the characters of Table Tennis player Shiraz Malik, his wife Antara Dixit, politician Ranveer Pratap Singh and his wife Chitrangada Singh prime-facie very apparently resemble Badminton player Syed Modi, his wife Amita Singh, then Amita Modi, Sanjay Sinh and his wife Garima Singh.
