= 1981 Uber Cup knockout stage =

Badminton tournament

The knockout stage for the 1981 Uber Cup began on 22 May 1981 with the first round and ended on 31 May with the final tie.

== Qualified teams ==
The teams that won their zonal tie qualified for the final knockout stage.

| Group | Winners |
|---|---|
| A | Japan |
| B | Malaysia |
| C | Canada |
| D | England |
| E | Indonesia |

== Bracket ==
First round
England
Bye
Japan
Bye
22 May 1981 – Tokyo
Malaysia | 0
Indonesia | 9
Bye
England

Second round
23 May 1981 – Tokyo
Japan | 9
Canada | 0
26 May 1981 – Tokyo
Indonesia | 5
England | 4

Challenge round
30 May 1981 – Tokyo
Japan | 6
Indonesia | 3

== First round ==
=== Indonesia vs Malaysia ===
Indonesia
9
Tokyo Metropolitan Gymnasium
22–23 May 1981

Malaysia
0

| | | | 1 | 2 | 3 |
|---|---|---|---|---|---|
| 1 | (Indonesia) (Malaysia) | Verawaty Wiharjo; Katherine Teh | 11; 0 | 11; 5 |
| 2 | (Indonesia) (Malaysia) | Ivana Lie; Leong Chai Lean | 11; 0 | 11; 0 |
| 3 | (Indonesia) (Malaysia) | Ruth Damayanti / Verawaty Wiharjo; Khor Lay See / Khaw Mooi Eng | 15; 3 | 15; 0 |
| 4 | (Indonesia) (Malaysia) | Theresia Widiastuti / Imelda Wiguna; Leong Chai Lean / Katherine Teh | 15; 9 | 15; 4 |
| 5 | (Indonesia) (Malaysia) | Taty Sumirah; Clare Choo | 11; 0 | 11; 3 |
| 6 | (Indonesia) (Malaysia) | Verawaty Wiharjo; Leong Chai Lean | 11; 6 | 11; 0 |
| 7 | (Indonesia) (Malaysia) | Ivana Lie; Katherine Teh | 11; 5 | 11; 4 |
| 8 | (Indonesia) (Malaysia) | Theresia Widiastuti / Imelda Wiguna; Khor Lay See / Khaw Mooi Eng | 15; 6 | 15; 12 |
| 9 | (Indonesia) (Malaysia) | Ruth Damayanti / Verawaty Wiharjo; Leong Chai Lean / Katherine Teh | 15; 1 | 15; 3 |

== Second round ==
=== Japan vs Canada ===
Japan
9
Tokyo Metropolitan Gymnasium
23–24 May 1981

Canada
0

| | | | 1 | 2 | 3 |
|---|---|---|---|---|---|
| 1 | (Japan) (Canada) | Saori Kondo; Wendy Carter | 11; 2 | 11; 1 |
| 2 | (Japan) (Canada) | Yoshiko Yonekura; Jane Youngberg | 11; 6 | 11; 7 |
| 3 | (Japan) (Canada) | Atsuko Tokuda / Yoshiko Yonekura; Wendy Carter / Sandra Skillings | 15; 2 | 15; 3 |
| 4 | (Japan) (Canada) | Saori Kondo / Mikiko Takada; Claire Backhouse / Jane Youngberg | 15; 5 | 15; 1 |
| 5 | (Japan) (Canada) | Atsuko Tokuda; Denyse Julien | 11; 2 | 11; 3 |
| 6 | (Japan) (Canada) | Yoshiko Yonekura; Wendy Carter | 11; 5 | 11; 7 |
| 7 | (Japan) (Canada) | Saori Kondo; Jane Youngberg | 11; 4 | 11; 0 |
| 8 | (Japan) (Canada) | Saori Kondo / Mikiko Takada; Wendy Carter / Sandra Skillings | 15; 2 | 15; 1 |
| 9 | (Japan) (Canada) | Atsuko Tokuda / Yoshiko Yonekura; Claire Backhouse / Jane Youngberg | 15; 2 | 15; 5 |

=== Indonesia vs England ===
Indonesia
5
Tokyo Metropolitan Gymnasium
26–27 May 1981

England
4

| | | | 1 | 2 | 3 |
|---|---|---|---|---|---|
| 1 | (Indonesia) (England) | Verawaty Wiharjo; Jane Webster | 11; 5 | 11; 5 |
| 2 | (Indonesia) (England) | Ivana Lie; Sally Leadbeater | 12; 11 | 11; 6 |
| 3 | (Indonesia) (England) | Ruth Damayanti / Verawaty Wiharjo; Nora Perry / Jane Webster | 11; 15 | 15; 5 | 18; 13 |
| 4 | (Indonesia) (England) | Theresia Widiastuti / Imelda Wiguna; Karen Chapman / Sally Leadbeater | 9; 15 | 15; 6 | 4; 15 |
| 5 | (Indonesia) (England) | Taty Sumirah; Karen Bridge | 5; 11 | 3; 11 |
| 6 | (Indonesia) (England) | Verawaty Wiharjo; Sally Leadbeater | 11; 4 | 11; 0 |
| 7 | (Indonesia) (England) | Ivana Lie; Jane Webster | 6; 11 | 11; 3 | 11; 12 |
| 8 | (Indonesia) (England) | Theresia Widiastuti / Imelda Wiguna; Nora Perry / Jane Webster | 8; 15 | 8; 15 |
| 9 | (Indonesia) (England) | Ruth Damayanti / Verawaty Wiharjo; Karen Chapman / Sally Leadbeater | 15; 5 | 15; 12 |

== Challenge round ==
The final of the 1981 Uber Cup saw Indonesia and Japan duel for the title for a fifth consecutive time since 1969. Japan started with a 1–0 lead when Saori Kondo defeated Indonesia's Ivana Lie 11–7, 10–12, 11–3. In the second singles, Verawaty Wiharjo, who was one game down against Yoshiko Yonekura came back to defeat her opponent in the next two games and earned the first point for Indonesia in the tie. Indonesia later increased their lead to 2–1 when Ruth Damayanti and Verawaty Wiharjo defeated the host pair of Saori Kondo and Mikiko Takada in a three-game thriller. In the second doubles match, Indonesia's Theresia Widiastuti and Imelda Wiguna took the first game from Atsuko Tokuda and Yoshiko Yonekura of Japan but could not hold onto their lead and lost the next two games to the Japanese. The teams were tied at 2–2.

In the second day of the final, Atsuko Tokuda of Japan won against Taty Sumirah of Indonesia to put Japan ahead 3–2. Japan's lead increased further when Saori Kondo defeated Verawaty Wiharjo in the first of the crossover singles. The second crossover singles saw Yoshiko Yonekura earn the winning point for Japan when she defeated Ivana Lie in three games. After the next two doubles matches, the final score between the two teams was 6–3, with Japan successfully retaining their Uber Cup title.

=== Japan vs Indonesia ===
Japan
6
Tokyo Metropolitan Gymnasium
30–31 May 1981

Indonesia
3

| | | | 1 | 2 | 3 |
|---|---|---|---|---|---|
| 1 | (Japan) (Indonesia) | Saori Kondo; Ivana Lie | 11; 7 | 10; 12 | 11; 3 |
| 2 | (Japan) (Indonesia) | Yoshiko Yonekura; Verawaty Wiharjo | 11; 2 | 2; 11 | 6; 11 |
| 3 | (Japan) (Indonesia) | Saori Kondo / Mikiko Takada; Ruth Damayanti / Verawaty Wiharjo | 15; 11 | 12; 15 | 3; 15 |
| 4 | (Japan) (Indonesia) | Atsuko Tokuda / Yoshiko Yonekura; Theresia Widiastuti / Imelda Wiguna | 17; 18 | 15; 11 | 15; 11 |
| 5 | (Japan) (Indonesia) | Atsuko Tokuda; Taty Sumirah | 11; 5 | 11; 9 |
| 6 | (Japan) (Indonesia) | Saori Kondo; Verawaty Wiharjo | 11; 6 | 11; 8 |
| 7 | (Japan) (Indonesia) | Yoshiko Yonekura; Ivana Lie | 3; 11 | 11; 7 | 12; 9 |
| 8 | (Japan) (Indonesia) | Saori Kondo / Mikiko Takada; Theresia Widiastuti / Imelda Wiguna | 15; 8 | 15; 11 |
| 9 | (Japan) (Indonesia) | Atsuko Tokuda / Yoshiko Yonekura; Ruth Damayanti / Verawaty Wiharjo | 15; 9 | 9; 15 | 12; 15 |
