= Bernárdez =

Bernárdez is a Spanish patronymic surname meaning "son of Bernardo". may refer to:

- Aurora Bernárdez, writer and translator
- Francisco Luis Bernárdez (1900–1978), Argentine poet, born in Buenos Aires
- Jefferson Bernárdez, Honduran football forward
- Manuel Bernardez (1867–1942), Spanish-born Uruguayan diplomat, poet, journalist, and editor
- Robel Bernardez (born 1972), Honduran international football midfielder
- Salvador Bernárdez (1953–2011), Honduran football forward
- Víctor Bernárdez, Honduran football defender

== See also ==
- Barnard
- Bernard
- Bernardi
- Bernards (disambiguation)
