= Bola Chittaranjan Das Shetty =

Indian writer

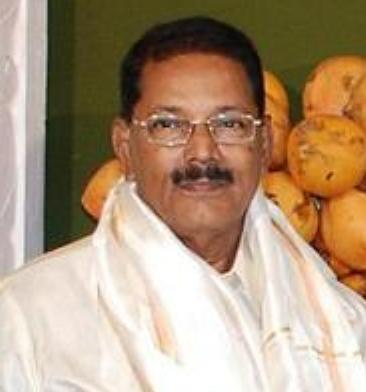
- Born: 30 August 1944; Bola Grama, Karkala, Udupi, Karnataka.
- Died: 7 August 2016 (aged 71); Mangalore, Karnataka, India
- Occupation: Novelist
- Spouse: Kushala Shetty
- Children: 2 Sons
- Writing career
- Genres: Fiction, poetry, drama, essays
- Notable awards: Tulu Gaurava Award; 2012; Rajyotsava Award, Literature; 2013

Bola Chittaranjan Shetty (30 August 1944 – 7 August 2016) is a famous Tulu and Kannada writer, who was the president of the 16th Mangalore Taluk Kannada Sahitya Sammelan held in year 2010. He died at his residence on 7 August 2016, and his cremation was held at Kuthar Guthu. He was 72.

== Biography ==
=== Early life, education and family ===
Chittaranjan Das Shetty was born in Bola, Karkala Taluk, Udupi District to a Bunt family. He is the first son of Partimar Guthu Manjayya Shetty & Bola Mathrengi Parari Rukmini Shetty. He was brought up in Mumbai, he studied till 9th standard in NKES Kannada School in Wadala Mumbai. He is married to Kushala Shetty and has two sons.

== Works ==
- 1. Ponnu Mann da bombe – Tulu Drama (1973)
- 2. Kambala, Essay on Kambala First ever document on Kambala (1983)
- 3. 'Alidulidavaru' Kannada Novel on Bunts & Alia kattu Culture (1990)
- 4. Kudi, Kannada Novel (2005)
- 5. 'Neer' – Tulu drama for kids (2006)
- 6. 'Binnedi' a book containing information about 'Paad-dana', a traditional Tulu art form.

'paad-dhana' describes the life and adventures of legends Koti-Chennayya with a contemporary touch. (2006)

- 7. Tulu Paad-dana CD – containing 'Binnedi'(Siri Paad-dana) (2007)
- 8. 'Amara beerera maamanne' Koti Chennaya Paad dana (2008)
- 9. 'Onti Obbanti – Kannada Novel on sexual Minorities or jogappas (male devotees of Yellamma Devi) of north Karnataka region (2008)
- 10. 'Tammale Aruvatta Katt' – Essay on Tulunadu Culture (2008)
- 11. 'Shri Madhwa Prana' Kakra Shetty 'Bennida Bele' -An epic poem on the early life of Madhwa, Vaishnavite saint and founder of the Dvaita school, who was born at Pajaka near Udupi, Paad Dana (2009)
- 12. 'Shri Madhwa Bharata' Tulu Paad Dana (2010)
- 13. 'Alidulidavaru' Kannada Novel on Bunts & Alia kattu Culture -Author reprint(2011)
- 14. 'Annarthi' – Kannada Paad dana (2011)
- 15. 'Atishaya' – Kannada Novel (2015)

== Awards ==
- Tulu 'Gaurava Award' – 2012
- Shri Krishna Vadirajanugraha Award-Udupi Paryaya Sode Mutt (2012)
- Rajyotsava Award-Literature – 2013
