= Inkpen (surname) =

Inkpen is a surname. Notable people with the surname include:

- Barbara Inkpen (born 1949), British track and field athlete
- Dave Inkpen (born 1954), Canadian ice hockey player
- Kori Inkpen, Canadian computer scientist
- Mick Inkpen (born 1952), British author and illustrator
