= The Chargesheet: Innocent or Guilty =

- Genre: Crime, Drama
- Based on: Murder of Syed Modi
- Written by: Priyanka Ghatak
- Directed by: Shashant Shah; Ravit Kumar Tyagi
- Starring: Arunoday Singh Ashwini Kalsekar Hrishitaa Bhatt Kishori Shahane Tridha Choudhury, Satish Kaushik Shakti Anand Sikandar Kher Shiv Panditt Tridha Choudhury
- Music by: Salim–Sulaiman
- Composer: Salim–Sulaiman
- Country of origin: India
- Original language: Hindi
- No. of seasons: 1
- No. of episodes: 8

Production
- Executive producer: Rohit Hippalgaonkar
- Producers: Ashoke Pandit; Roshan Kanal
- Cinematography: Santosh Thundiyil; Amar Kamble
- Editor: Jeetu Rall
- Production companies: Ashoke Pandit Production; Daytee Pictures

Original release
- Network: Zee5
- Release: 1 January 2020

The Chargesheet: Innocent or Guilty? is a 2020 Indian Hindi-language crime drama streaming television series written by Priyanka Ghatak and directed by Shashant Shah and Ravit Kumar Tyagi and Shashant Shah. Its stars Arunoday Singh, Ashwini Kalsekar, Hrishitaa Bhatt, Kishori Shahane, Tridha Choudhury, Satish Kaushik, Shakti Anand, Sikandar Kher, Shiv Panditt, and others.

Though not officially acknowledged, but the series is very clearly based on badminton star Syed Modi murder case. The characters of Table Tennis player Shiraz Malik, his wife Antara Dixit, politician Ranveer Pratap Singh and his wife Chitrangada Singh prime-facie very apparently resemble Badminton player Syed Modi, his wife Amita Singh, then Amita Modi, Congress politician Sanjay Sinh and his wife Garima Singh.

== Cast ==
- Arunoday Singh as Ranveer Pratap Singh, very apparently based on then Congress leader Sanjay Sinh.
- Sikandar Kher as Vidhur Mehra
- Shiv Panditt as Shiraz Malik, very apparently based on Syed Modi
- Tridha Choudhury as Antaraa Dixit, very apparently based on then Amita Modi, wife of Syed Modi
- Hrishitaa Bhatt as Chitrangadha Singh, very apparently based on Garima Singh, wife of Sanjay Sinh
- Shakti Anand as Sanjeev Singh
- Ashwini Kalsekar as Abha Abhyankar
- Satish Kaushik as Laxman Chotrani
- Kishori Shahane as Gayatri Dixit
- Mahendra Shrivas as Jagan
- Prateek Dogra as Abhinav Mathur
- Resh Lamba as Miraz
- Bobby Khanna as Politician
- Aroop Paul as Joint Director of CBI
- Anil Kumar as Bodhi Singh
- Shreya Sinha as Reporter
- Dinesh Kaushik as Anand Sehgal
- VJimmy Sharma as Naulakha
- Ramakant Dayma as Judge
- Vivek Savarikar as Corrupt leader

== Plot ==
Syed Modi murder case, as regards a seven-time national badminton champion Syed Modi, served as the inspiration for this television series, though it was not officially acknowledge by the makers.

Though the characters are called Ranveer Pratap Singh and his wife Chitrangadha Singh with Shiraz Malik, his wife Antaraa Dixit, they are very apparently based on the characters of Sanjay Sinh, his wife Garima Singh, Syed Modi and his then wife Amita Modi.

The web series details every action that led to this expert shuttler being shot and killed as he left a stadium following a normal practise, while making such visible transformations like changing his name and the name he played. The CBI began the investigation and found evidence pointing at a prominent politician, Sanjay Singh, and he was arrested. However, the conspiracy, the conspirators and the motive behind the murder are far more complicated than is apparent on the surface.

== Release ==
The series was premiered on 1 January 2020 on OTT platform Zee5.

== Reception ==
Hindustan Times wrote "A few colourless comments by Sikander’s subordinate look like a forced attempt to add some humour but in vain. The forever silent brother of the late sportsman, who watches the court proceedings with moist eyes leaves the viewer with a similar expression."

Critic Deepa Gahlot listed the series one out of ten political dramas on OTT.

Amar Ujala rated the series 3.5 stars out of 5.

Binged gave a negative opinion and wrote "The courtroom sequences feel so over the top and narratively inconsistent. The writing also gets weaker towards the end where it (the writing) becomes very crucial to engage."

The Envoy Web wrote "An absorbing and sensational story-line could not be converted into an interesting fare by director Shashant Shah. He has faltered maybe owing to the need of balancing a true story with fictional liberties."

== Trivia ==
Before this, Actor and director Dev Anand had made a thriller movie based on the murder of Modi. Sau Crore was released in 1991 with the role of Modi being played by Raman Kapoor. The movie was a surprise hit at the box office.
