= Salon Assembly constituency =

Constituency of the Uttar Pradesh legislative assembly in India

Salon
- Constituency No. 181 for the Uttar Pradesh Legislative Assembly

Constituency details
- Country: India
- Region: North India
- State: Uttar Pradesh
- District: Rae Bareli
- Lok Sabha constituency: Amethi
- Total electors: 3,49,294
- Reservation: SC

Member of Legislative Assembly
- 18th Uttar Pradesh Legislative Assembly
- Incumbent Ashok Kori
- Party: Bharatiya Janata Party
- Elected year: 2022

Salon is a constituency of the Uttar Pradesh Legislative Assembly covering the city of Salon in the Rae Bareli district of Uttar Pradesh, India.

Salon is one of five assembly constituencies in the Amethi Lok Sabha constituency. Since 2008, this assembly constituency is numbered 181 amongst 403 constituencies. As of 2022, it is represented by Ashok Kori of the Bharatiya Janata Party.

== Members of the Legislative Assembly ==
Year	Name	Party
2002	Asha Kishore	Samajwadi Party
2007	Shiv Balak Pasi	Indian National Congress
2012	Asha kishore	Samajwadi Party
2017	Dal Bahadur Kori	Bharatiya Janata Party
2022	Ashok Kori	Bharatiya Janata Party

== Election results ==
=== 2027 ===
2027 Uttar Pradesh Legislative Assembly election: Salon
Party	Candidate	Votes	%	±%
BJP				
INDIA				
BSP				
NOTA	None of the above			
Majority				
Turnout				
gain from		Swing		

=== 2022 ===
2022 Uttar Pradesh Legislative Assembly election: Salon
Party	Candidate	Votes	%	±%
BJP	Ashok Kori	87,715	43.79	+3.35
SP	Jagdish Prasad	85,604	42.73	
INC	Arjun Kumar	11,439	5.71	−26.41
BSP	Swati Singh	9,335	4.66	−15.99
NOTA	None of the above	2,042	1.02	−0.85
Majority		2,111	1.06	−7.26
Turnout		200,323	57.35	+0.59
BJP hold		Swing		

2017 Uttar Pradesh Legislative Assembly Election: Salon
Party	Candidate	Votes	%	±%
BJP	Dal Bahadur Kori	78,028	40.44	
INC	Suresh Chaudhary	61,973	32.12	
BSP	Braj Lal Pasi	39,851	20.65	
RLD	Parasnath Dhangar	1,893	0.98	
Manavtawadi Samaj Party	Amit Kumar	1,884	0.98	
NOTA	None of the above	3,540	1.87	
Majority		16,055	8.32	
Turnout		192,964	56.76	

== See also ==
- Raebareli district
- List of constituencies of the Uttar Pradesh Legislative Assembly
