= Bernards =

Bernards may refer to:

- Bernards High School, a comprehensive four-year regional public high school located in Bernardsville, New Jersey
- Bernards Township, New Jersey, United States

== People with the surname ==
- Kori Bernards (born 1953), Vice President of Corporate Communications for the Motion Picture Association of America
- René Bernards (born 1953), Dutch cancer researcher

== See also ==
- Bernard
