= Maharaji Prajapati =

Indian politician

Member of Uttar Pradesh Legislative Assembly
- Incumbent
- Assumed office 10 March 2022
- Preceded by: Garima Singh
- Constituency: Amethi

Personal details
- Party: Samajwadi Party
- Occupation: Politician

Maharaji Prajapati is an Indian politician. She was elected to Amethi in the 2022 Uttar Pradesh Legislative Assembly election as a member of the Samajwadi Party. She is the wife of the former minister Gayatri Prasad Prajapati.
