= Kuris =

Kuris may refer to:

- Kuris, Armenia, a village
- Kūris, a Lithuanian surname
- Konca Kuriş (1961–1999), a Turkish feminist

== See also ==
- Kuri (disambiguation)
