= Shashant Shah =

Film director

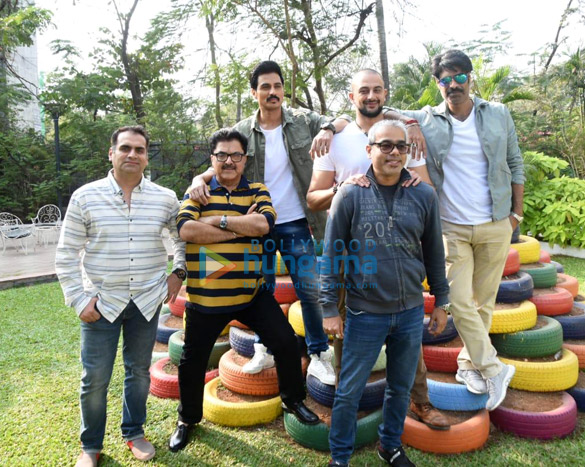
- Shashant Shah with his team during the promotion of The Chargesheet: Innocent or Guilty, 2020
- Years active: 2008–present
- Notable work: Dasvidaniya

Shashant Shah is an Indian film director who predominantly works in the Hindi cinema.

== Career ==
Shashant was initially a choreographer before shifting to a career in direction. Shashant made his directorial debut with Dasvidaniya in 2008, followed by Chalo Dilli in 2011. He films are inspired from his personal experiences and from filmmakers like Pedro Almodóvar and Frank Darabont. He collaborated with actor Vinay Pathak on his first three films and their relationship dates back to their time at Channel V. He made his web series directorial debut with Shaadi Boys in 2016.

== Filmography ==
List of Shashant Shah film and television credits
Year	Title	Notes
2008	Dasvidaniya	
2011	Chalo Dilli	
2013	Bajatey Raho	
2015	Sumit Sambhal Lega	
2016	Dahleez	TV series
2016	Shaadi Boys	Directorial debut
2017	Love Ka Hai Intezaar	Creative director
2019	The Verdict – State vs Nanavati	Web series
2020	The Chargesheet: Innocent or Guilty	TV series
2022	Operation Romeo	
2023	Akelli	Co-producer
2026	Chiraiya	Web series
