= Kishori Lal Sharma =

Indian politician

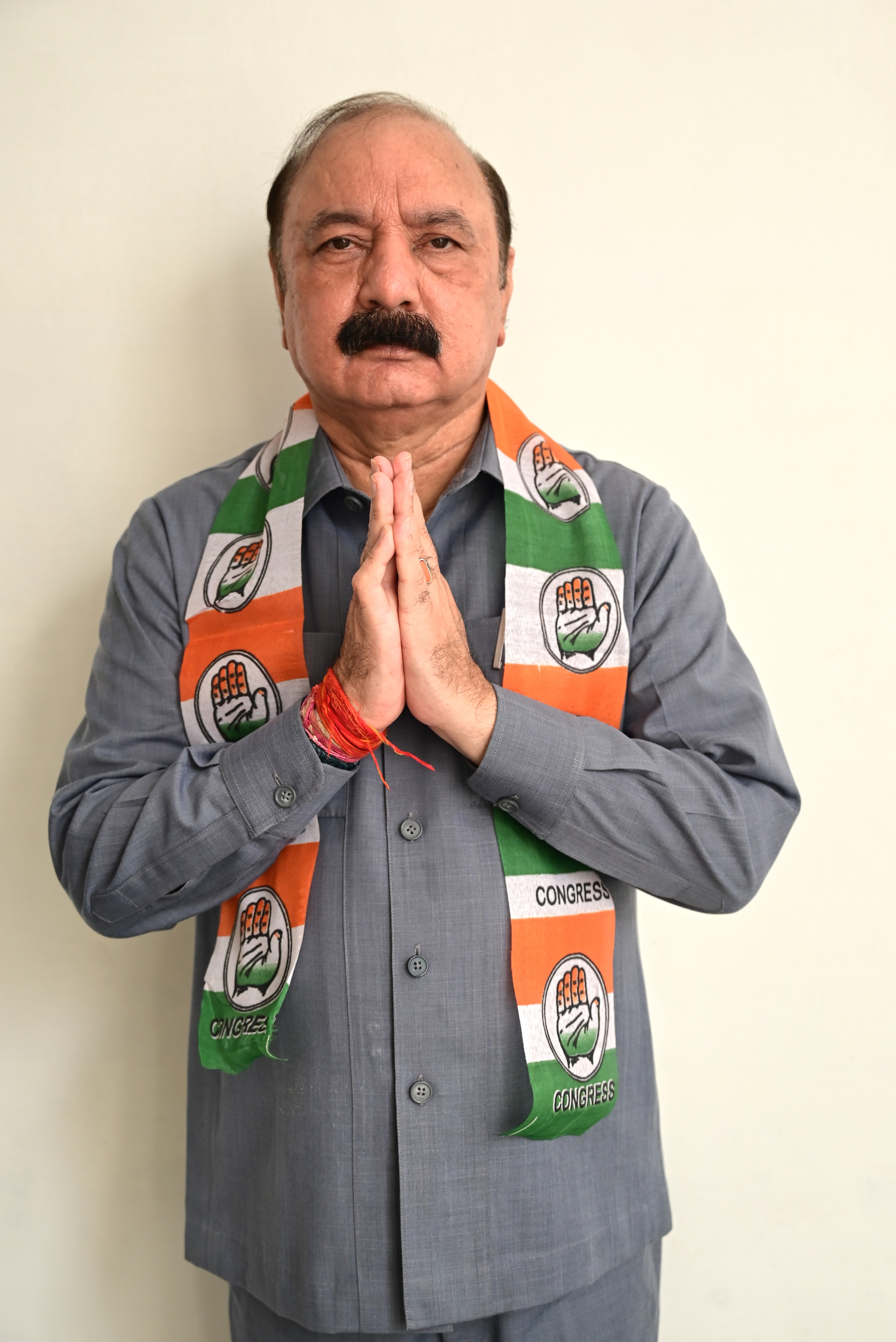

Member of Parliament, Lok Sabha
- Incumbent
- Assumed office 4 June 2024
- Preceded by: Smriti Irani
- Constituency: Amethi

Personal details
- Born: 15 December 1960 (age 65) Hoshiarpur, Punjab, India
- Party: Indian National Congress
- Spouse: Kiran Bala
- Children: 2
- Education: Panjab University

Kishori Lal Sharma (born 15 December 1960) is an Indian politician and social worker who has been elected as Member of Parliament from Amethi Lok Sabha constituency in the 2024 Indian General elections. He is a member of Indian National Congress.

== Early life ==
Kishori Lal Sharma grew up in Ludhiana, in Punjab.

== Political career ==
Sharma first met Rajiv Gandhi in 1983. Amethi used to be Rajiv Gandhi's Lok Sabha constituency, and in 1987, Gandhi sent Sharma to monitor and review work in the constituency on behalf of the Indian National Congress (INC). After Gandhi's assassination in 1991, Satish Sharma became the Indian National Congress candidate for Amethi, and Kishori Lal Sharma continued managing and coordinating the INC's work in the constituency. This continued when Sonia Gandhi became the INC candidate in the 1999 general election. In the 2004 general election Sonia Gandhi became the INC candidate for Rae Bareli and Rahul Gandhi became the INC candidate for Amethi; so Sharma managed and coordinated INC work in both constituencies. Sharma was blamed by the INC for antagonising caste leaders and other people of influence in Amethi, which was thought to have been a factor in the BJP defeating Rahul Gandhi in the 2019 general election. The BJP had also won the Amethi seat in 1998.

When Sharma filed his nomination papers for the 2024 Indian General Elections, Priyanka Gandhi said: "Our family has a long-standing relationship with Kishori Lal Sharma-ji. He has always been engaged wholeheartedly in serving the people of Amethi and Raebareli. His passion for public service is an example in itself".

Sharma is the Member of Parliament elect from Amethi Lok Sabha constituency in the 2024 Indian general Elections. He defeated Bharatiya Janta Party candidate Smriti Irani by a margin of 1,67,196 votes.
