= Kūris =

Kūris is the masculine form of a Lithuanian family name. Its feminine forms are: Kūrienė (married woman or widow) and Kūrytė (unmarried woman).

The surname may refer to:

- Egidijus Kūris (born 1961), former President of the Constitutional Court of the Republic of Lithuania
- Pranas Kūris (born 1938), Lithuanian Judge of the European Court of Justice

== See also ==
- Kuris (disambiguation)
