= Koeri (disambiguation) =

Koeri may refer to:

- Koeri, an Indian caste
- Koeri, Estonia, an uninhabited village in Estonia
- Kandilli Observatory, Kandilli Observatory and Earthquake Research Institute in Turkey

== See also ==
- Kori (disambiguation)
