= Vidya Dhar Bajpai =

Indian politician

Member of Parliament, Lok Sabha
- In office 1967-1977
- Succeeded by: Ravindra Pratap Singh
- Constituency: Amethi, Uttar Pradesh

Personal details
- Party: Indian National Congress

Vidya Dhar Bajpai is an Indian politician. He was elected to the Lok Sabha, lower house of the Parliament of India from Amethi, Uttar Pradesh as a member of the Indian National Congress.
