= 1981 Uber Cup =

1981 Uber Cup ユーバー杯1981
Tournament details
- Dates: 22 – 31 May 1981
- Edition: 9th
- Level: International
- Nations: 5
- Venue: Tokyo Metropolitan Gymnasium
- Location: Tokyo, Japan

The 1981 Uber Cup was the ninth edition of the Uber Cup, the women's badminton team competition. The tournament took place in the 1980-81 badminton season. Japan won its fifth title after beating Indonesia in the final round in Tokyo.

This edition was the first and only time the tournament, including the qualification tournament was played in a best-of-9 format, similar to the Thomas Cup where two singles and two doubles were played on the first day, followed by three singles and two doubles on the second day.

== Qualification ==
14 teams from 4 regions took part in the competition. As defending champions, Japan skipped the qualifications and played directly in the second round of the inter-zone ties (team matches), effectively the semi-finals of the tournament.

Means of qualification	Date	Venue	Slot	Qualified teams
1978 Uber Cup	13–20 May 1978	Auckland	1	Japan
Asian Zone	–	–	1	Malaysia
American Zone	7 December 1980 – 22 February 1981	Lima; Quebec City	1	Canada
European Zone	18 November 1980 – 4 April 1981	Dunfermline; Helsingborg; Örnsköldsvik; Redbridge; Sunderland	1	England
Australasian Zone	28–31 October 1980	Jakarta	1	Indonesia
Total			5	

From the qualifying rounds, four countries progressed to the inter-zone ties. Malaysia directly qualified for the final tournament as they were the only team to enter the Asian Zone. In the European zone final, England defeated Denmark 5–4. From the Pan American zone, the Canada defeated the United States 8–1. In the Australasian zone, Indonesia defeated India 9–0.

== Knockout stage ==
The following four teams, shown by region, qualified for the 1981 Uber Cup. In the first round, Indonesia defeated Malaysia 9–0. In the second round, defending champions Japan beat Canada 9–0 while Indonesia defeated England 5–4.

Indonesia clashed with Japan for a fifth consecutive time in the final. Japan won the Uber Cup for the fifth time by defeating Indonesia 6–3 in the final.

=== Bracket ===
First round
England
Bye
Japan
Bye
22 May 1981 – Tokyo
Malaysia	0
Indonesia	9
Bye
England

Second round
23 May 1981 – Tokyo
Japan	9
Canada	0
26 May 1981 – Tokyo
Indonesia	5
England	4

Challenge round
30 May 1981 – Tokyo
Japan	6
Indonesia	3

=== First round ===
22 May 1981
23 May 1981

Indonesia	9–0	Malaysia
Report

Tokyo Metropolitan Gymnasium, Japan

=== Second round ===
23 May 1981
24 May 1981

Japan	8–1	Canada
Report

Tokyo Metropolitan Gymnasium, Japan

26 May 1981
27 May 1981

Indonesia	5–4	England
Report

Tokyo Metropolitan Gymnasium, Japan

=== Challenge round ===
30 May 1981
31 May 1981

Japan	6–3	Indonesia
Report

Tokyo Metropolitan Gymnasium, Japan

1981 Uber Cup winner

Japan
Fifth title
