= Ravindra Pratap Singh =

Indian politician

Member of Parliament, Lok Sabha
- In office 1977-1980
- Preceded by: Vidya Dhar Bajpai
- Succeeded by: Sanjay Gandhi
- Constituency: Amethi, Uttar Pradesh

Personal details
- Born: 7 July 1938 VijaiMaukote, Pratapgarh District, United Provinces, British India (present-day, Uttar Pradesh, India)
- Party: Janata Party
- Other political affiliations: Bharatiya Jana Sangh
- Spouse: Nirmala Devi (m. 1952)
- Children: 6

Ravindra Pratap Singh (7 July 1938) is an Indian former politician associated with Jana Sangh, Janata Party and BJP. He was elected to the Lok Sabha, lower house of the Parliament of India from Amethi, Uttar Pradesh defeating Sanjay Gandhi in the 1977 Indian general election as member of the Janata Party.

== Personal life ==
Singh was born on 7 July 1938 to Naresh Bahadur Singh at Vijayi Mau village, Kunda Tehsil, Pratapgarh district. He got his primary education from Gandhi Higher Secondary School, Sangipur, Pratapgarh. He received his Bachelor of Commerce and LLB degrees from Udai Pratap Autonomous College in Varanasi. Singh married Nirmala Devi in February 1952, with whom he had three sons and three daughters. By profession he was a lawyer and agriculturist.

== Positions held ==
Various positions held by Singh.

- District Vice-president, Jan Sangh
- District Joint Secretary, Jan Sangh
- District Secretary, Jan Sangh
- Secretary, Ranbir Ranjay Degree College, Amethi
- Sultanpur, chairman, Shri Naresh Bahadur Junior Higher Secondary School, Kohra, Amethi
- Samyukta Sevak, Bharat Sevak Samaj
- Member, Uttar Pradesh Legislative Assembly, 1967 to 1969
