= Kori Kambla =

Agricultural festival in Tulunadu

Kori Kambla is a distinct agriculture-based celebration in Tulunadu. This refers to a kind of collective ploughing and planting on a fixed day for the enelu (Tulu: ಏಣೆಲ್) cultivation. A general race of buffaloes is known as kori (kando korune) Kambala. It highlights the principle of cooperation in cultivation which, in turn, helped in moulding the community life of the people of Tulunadu. It is a collectively executed task in which every household participates with men and animals. Celebrated in the traditional way in the household family here every year. The villagers and the Guttinamane family celebrates the ritual with pomp and gaiety.

== History ==
=== Pookare ===
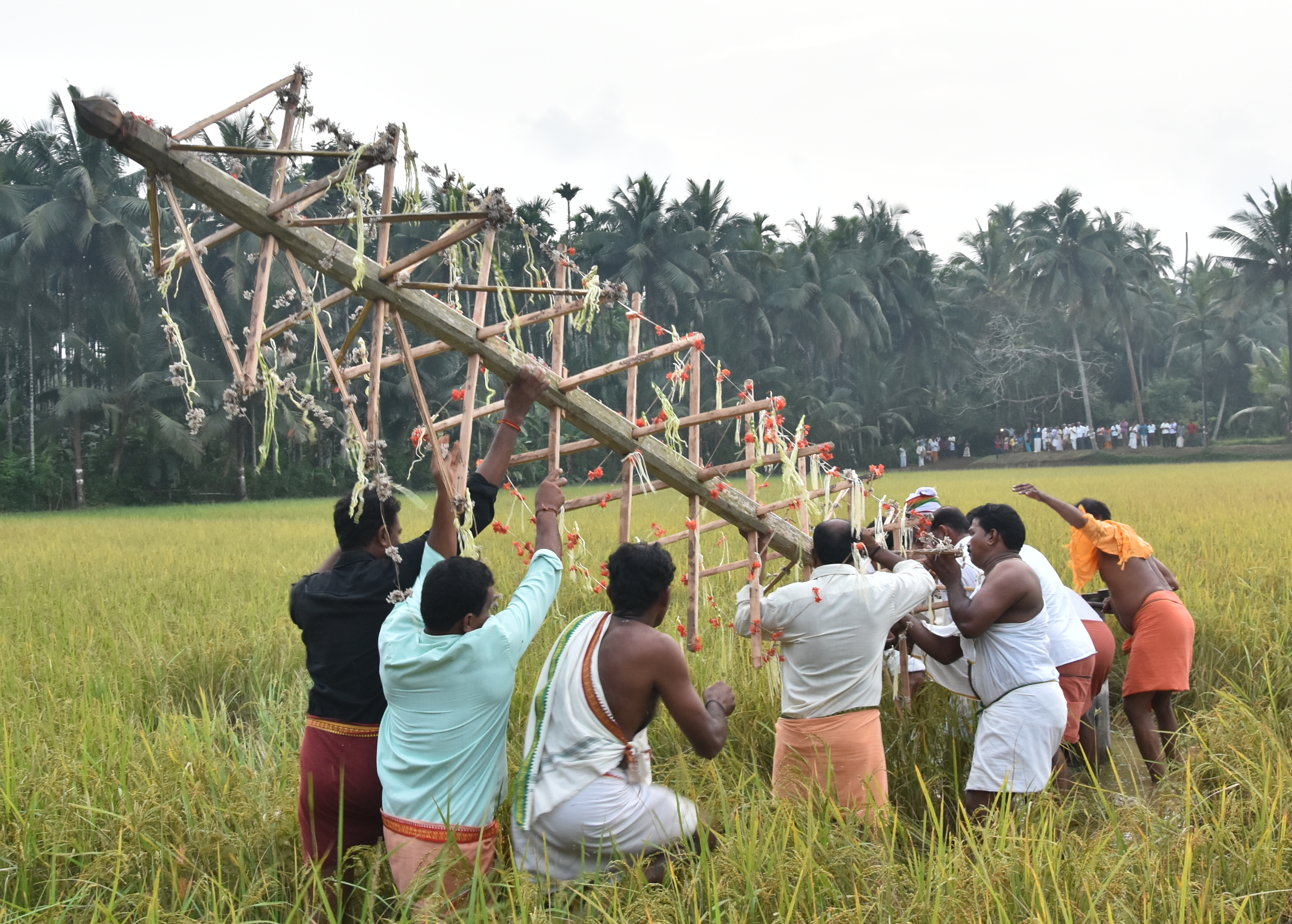
Pookare

The rituals are observed during ploughing of the land are known as 'kandada kori' in Tulu Language. Before sowing is undertaken, it's a custom to place a pillar (known as 'pookare kamba') in the middle of the paddy field. The placing of the stone pillar symbolises marriage, with land being the bride and pillar/pole, the groom.

The pookare pillar is made of arecatree. On the previous day of pookare, an areca tree is felled and placed on the upper part of the field. From this tree, members of the carpenter community prepare the pookare pillar. A long pillar is scraped and chopped off smoothly and the nile is assembled into it and the nele placed at the bottom is known as thottilu nele. The remaining niles are assembled into it in a triangular shape. Later, the tender areca flowers are placed on the top by the members of the Poojary community. Members of the barber community decorate it with different types of flowers like chendu, pade, kepala, and other types of flowers and later the ‘mudi’ made of ‘hongare’ tree is placed on the eery ? top by the carpenter. After completing the pookare, the carpenters hand it over to the pookare carriers.

=== Bootha in Kori Kambala ===
During this agriculture based ritual, deities such as Urava, Erubanta, Nagabhoota and Bermer are invoked and worshipped. Prominent god of Kambala tradition is Naga Bermer. The coming together of bhutas ‘Naga’ and ‘Bermer’ led to the creation of Naga Bermer.

==== Urava and Erubanta ====
Erubanta and Urava are from the same family and known as sub-deities of Naga Bermer. According to Tulu-English dictionary, Urave means a 'man who ploughs' and Eru means a 'bull'. So now we know the reason behind the worship Eru banta During the ritual, right after the main deities are worshipped, the makeup is altered slightly to make way for the worship of the sub-deities. In Uruv and Eru banta has no Paddana chanting formally paddana is chanting for all Daiva Kola . Paddana singing of the kabitha and ural Celling of stories and proverbs.

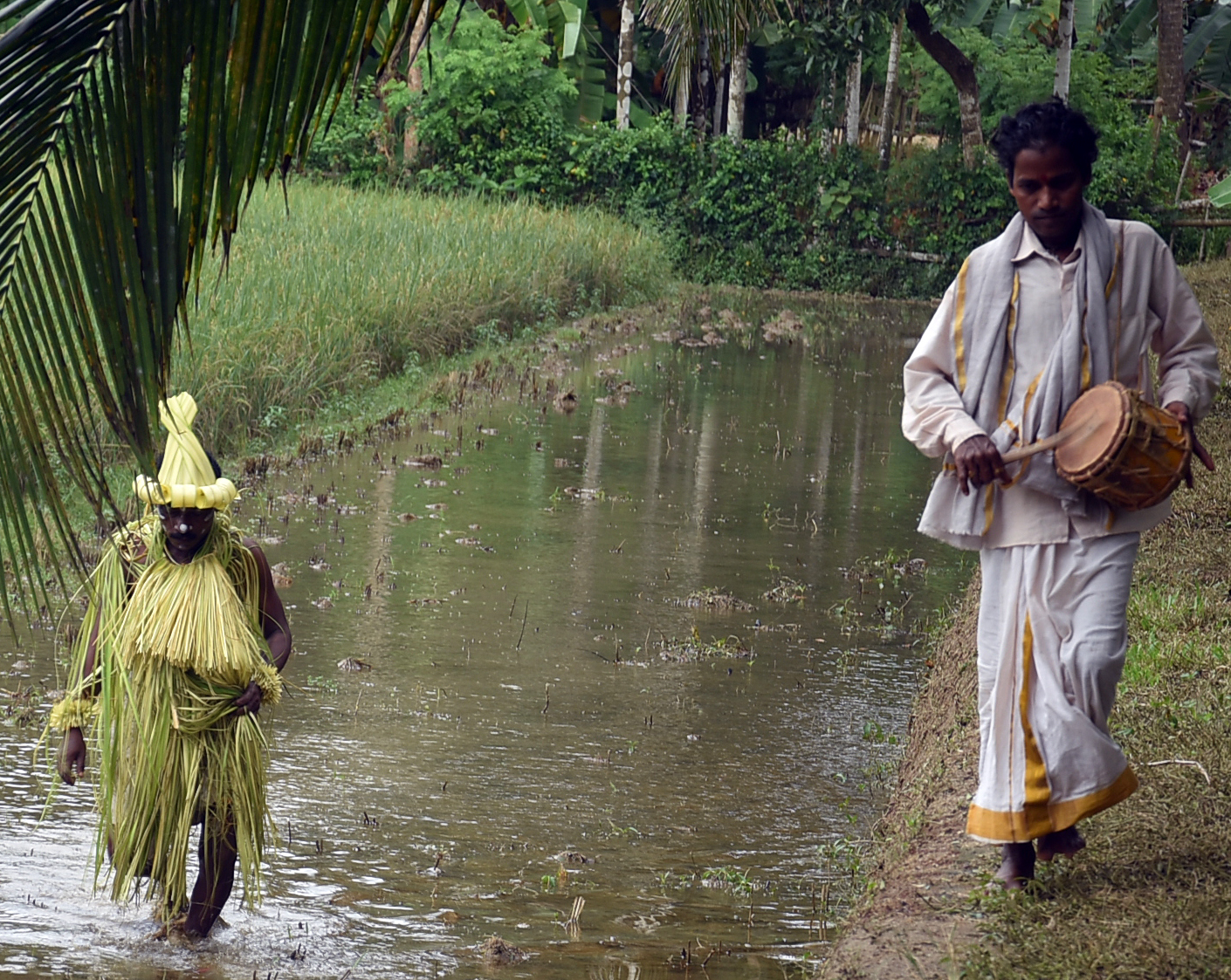
Urava Daiva
