= Kuri language =

Kuri language may refer to:

- One of the Yuin–Kuric languages, mainly extinct Australian Aboriginal languages
- Kuri language (Austronesian), of New Guinea
- Kuri language (Chadic), a dialect of Yedina language
- Kuri-Dou language, of Brazil
