= Hufrish Nariman =

Indian badminton player

Sport
- Country: India
- Sport: Badminton
Medal record
Representing India
Women's badminton
Asian Games
Bronze medal – third place	1982 New Delhi	Women's Team

Hufrish Nariman is an Indian former badminton player. She was the bronze medalist in badminton at the 1982 Asian Games in the Women's Team event.She is a coach in the Prakash Padukone Badminton Academy.
