= Kuri, Estonia =

Village in Estonia

Kuri
- Village
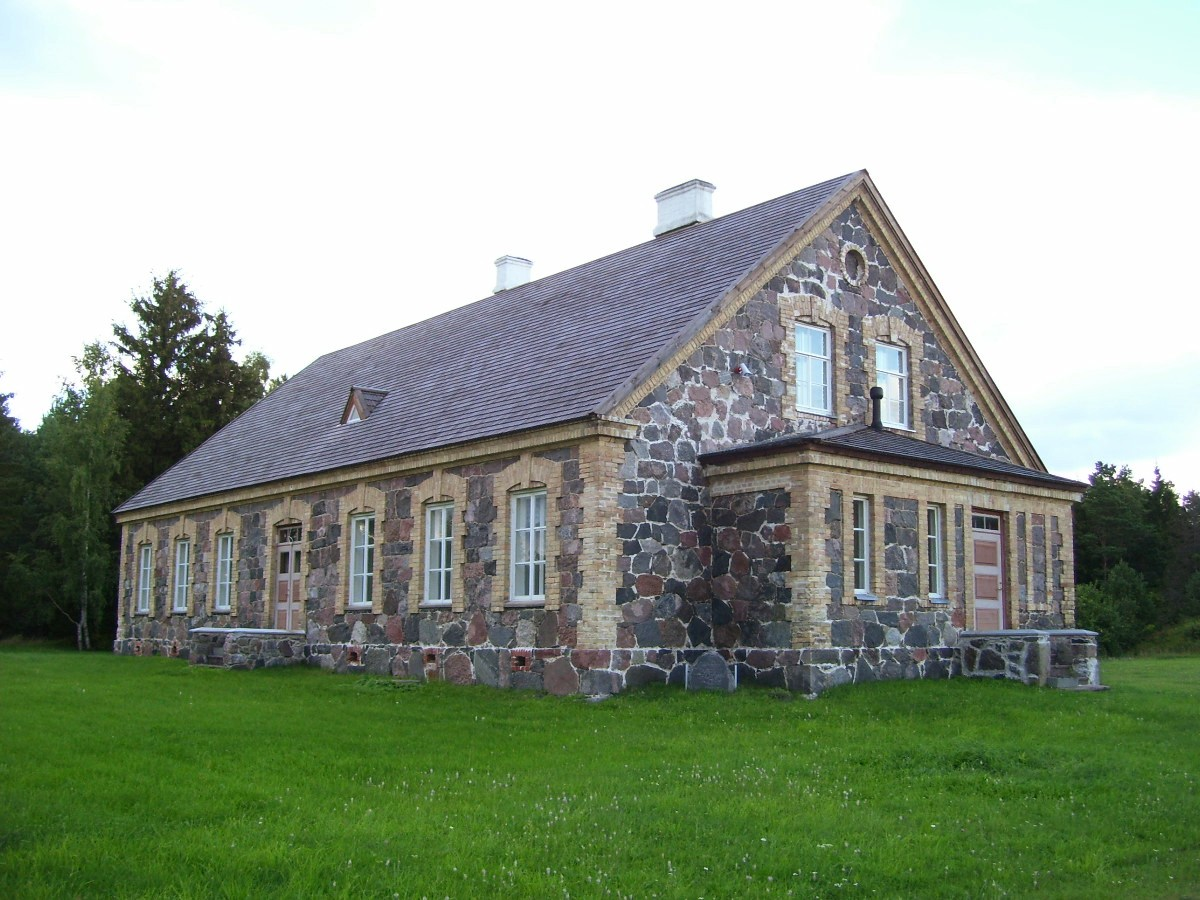
- The former Baptist church in Kuri

- Location within Estonia
- Coordinates: 58°57′N 22°56′E
- Country: Estonia
- County: Hiiu County
- Parish: Hiiumaa Parish
- Time zone: UTC+2 (EET)
  - Summer (DST): UTC+3 (EEST)

Kuri is a village in Hiiumaa Parish, Hiiu County in northwestern Estonia.

== Gallery ==
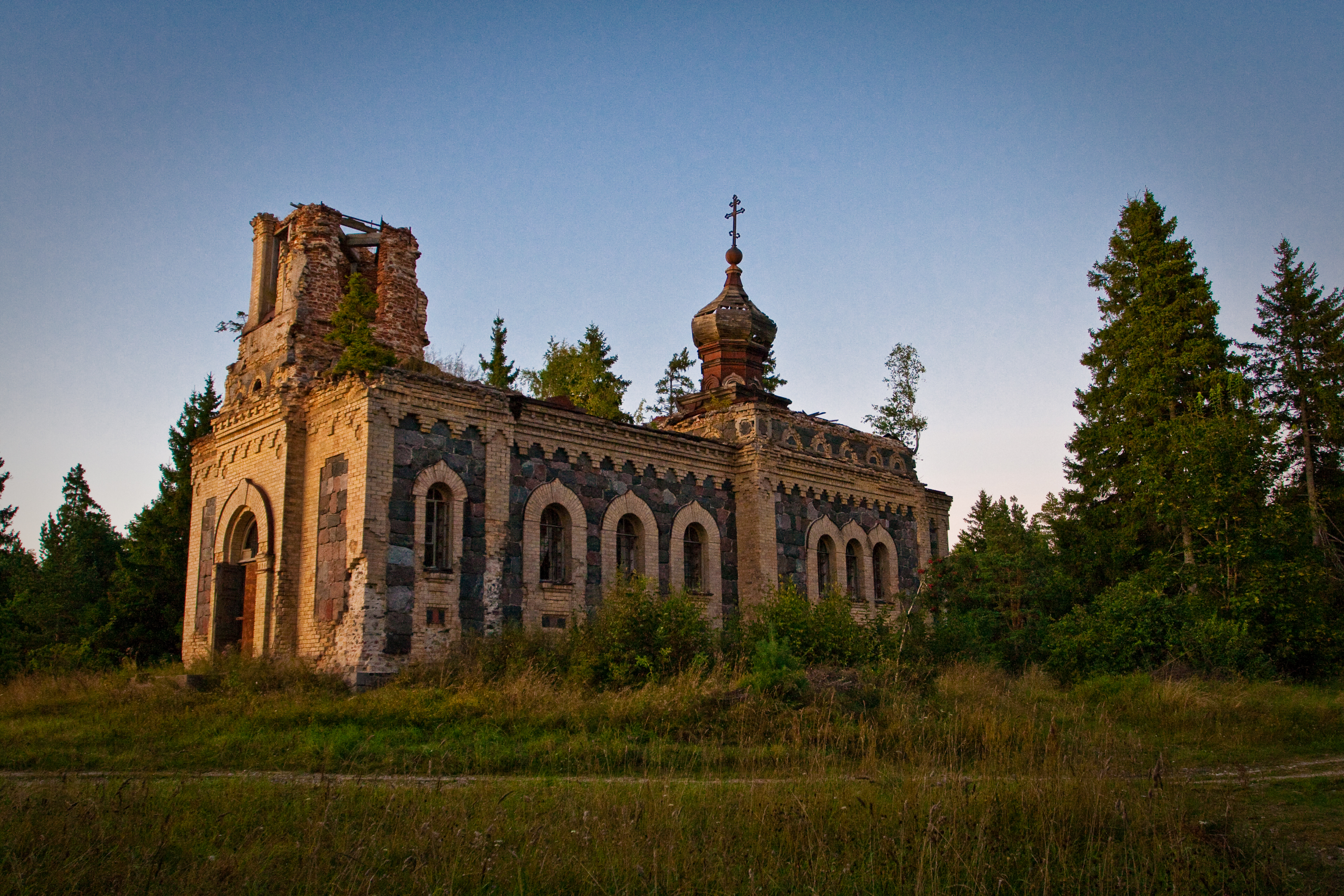
Ruins of Kuri Orthodox church

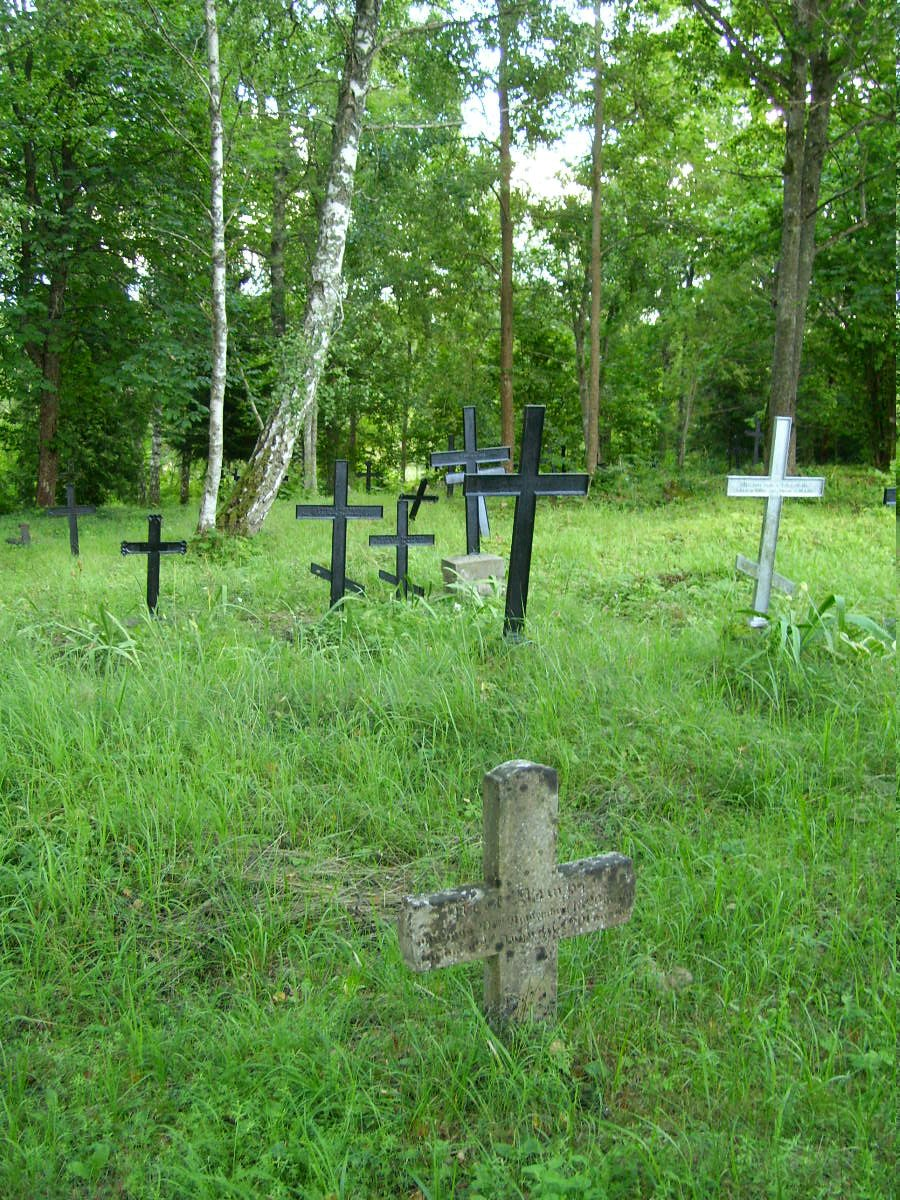
Kuri cemetery

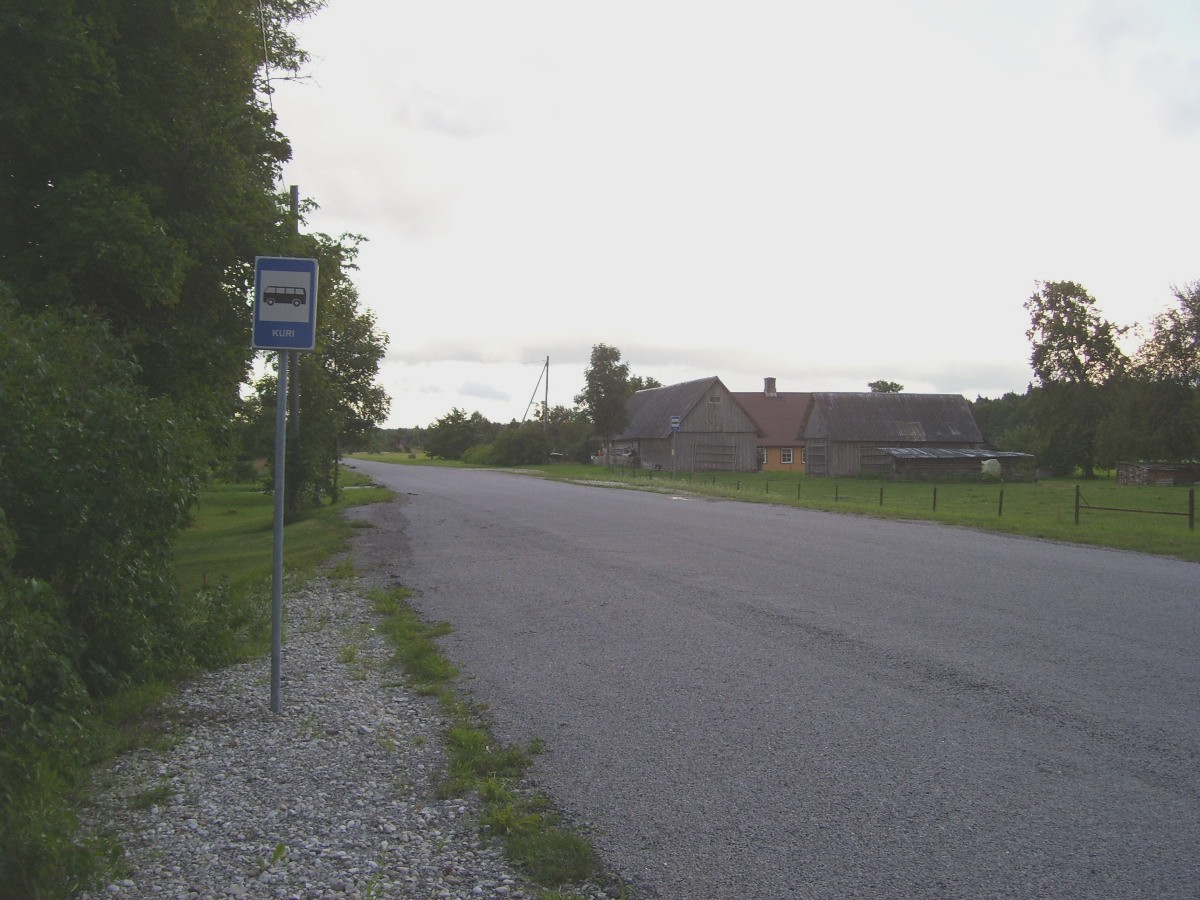
Kuri bus stop
