= KURY-FM =

- Brookings, Oregon; United States
- Broadcast area: Crescent City, California
- Frequency: 95.3 MHz
- Branding: KURY 95.3

Programming
- Format: Classic hits

Ownership
- Owner: Bicoastal Media; (Bicoastal Media Licenses II, LLC)
- Sister stations: KURY

History
- First air date: 1977
- Call sign meaning: KURY = Curry County

Technical information
- Licensing authority: FCC
- Facility ID: 35798
- Class: C2
- ERP: 8,700 watts
- HAAT: 355 meters (1165 feet)
- Transmitter coordinates: 42°07′22.3″N 124°18′0.3″W
- Translator: 101.3 K267AD (Cave Junction)

Links
- Public license information: Public file; LMS

KURY-FM (95.3 FM) is a radio station licensed to serve Brookings, Oregon, United States. The station is owned by Bicoastal Media, through licensee Bicoastal Media Licenses II, LLC.

== Programming ==
KURY-FM broadcasts a classic hits music format to Curry County, Oregon, and the greater Crescent City, California, area.

== History ==
This station initially signed on in the late 1970s as KURY-FM as a simulcast partner to KURY, both owner by Norman Oberst's KURY Radio, Inc. After nearly 30 years of owning the company, Norman Oberst applied to the FCC to transfer control of KURY Radio, Inc., to Dorothy J. Garvin in January 1993. The transfer was approved by the FCC on February 24, 1993, and the transaction was consummated on the same day.

KURY Radio, Inc., reached an agreement in February 2005 to sell this station and KURY to Eureka Broadcasting Co., Inc. (Hugo Papstein, president) for a reported combined price of $775,000. The deal was approved by the FCC on April 19, 2005, and the transaction was consummated on May 5, 2005. At the time of the sale, KURY-FM broadcast a middle of the road-leaning adult contemporary music format.

Effective January 31, 2020, Eureka Broadcasting sold KURY-FM, KURY and translator K287CF to Bicoastal Media for $500,000.

== Translators ==
KURY-FM programming is also carried on a broadcast translator station to extend or improve the coverage area of the station.

Broadcast translator for KURY-FM
Call sign	Frequency	City of license	FID	ERP (W)	Class	FCC info
K267AD	101.3 FM	Cave Junction, Oregon	76887	10	D	LMS
