= Dal Bahadur Kori =

Indian politician (died 2021)

Member of the Legislative Assembly
- In office 11 March 2017 – 6 May 2021
- Succeeded by: Ashok Kori
- Constituency: Salon

Personal details
- Born: 1956 or 1957
- Died: May 6, 2021 (aged 64)
- Party: Bharatiya Janata Party
- Occupation: MLA
- Profession: Politician

Dal Bahadur Kori (1956/1957 – 6 May 2021) was an Indian politician and a member of 17th Legislative Assembly, Uttar Pradesh of India. He represented the 'Salon' constituency in Rae Bareli district of Uttar Pradesh.

== Political career ==
Kori contested Uttar Pradesh Assembly Election as Bharatiya Janata Party candidate and defeated his close contestant Suresh Chaudhary from Indian National Congress with a margin of 16,055 votes.

Kori died, aged 64, on 6 May 2021 from complications of COVID-19.

== Posts held ==
#	From	To	Position	Comments
01	2017	2021	Member, 17th Legislative Assembly	
