= Kuri, Khuzestan =

Kuri كوري
- Village
- Location within Iran
- Coordinates: 32°22′03″N 49°22′09″E
- Country: Iran
- Province: Khuzestan
- County: Andika
- Bakhsh: Central
- Rural District: Qaleh-ye Khvajeh

Population (2006)
  - Total: 88
- Time zone: UTC+3:30 (IRST)
  - Summer (DST): UTC+4:30 (IRDT)

Kuri (Persian: كوري, also Romanized as Kūrī) is a village in Qaleh-ye Khvajeh Rural District, in the Central District of Andika County, Khuzestan Province, Iran. At the 2006 census, its population was 88, in 16 families.
