= KURY (AM) =

- Brookings, Oregon; United States
- Frequency: 910 kHz
- Branding: KURY 910

Programming
- Format: Adult standards

Ownership
- Owner: Bicoastal Media; (Bicoastal Media Licenses II, LLC)
- Sister stations: KURY-FM

History
- First air date: May 2, 1958
- Call sign meaning: Curry County

Technical information
- Licensing authority: FCC
- Facility ID: 35801
- Class: D
- Power: 1,000 watts (day); 37 watts (night)
- Transmitter coordinates: 42°02′34.4″N 124°14′41.3″W
- Translator: 105.3 K287CF (Brookings)

Links
- Public license information: Public file; LMS

KURY (910 AM) is a radio station licensed to Brookings, Oregon, United States. The station, established in 1958, is currently owned by Bicoastal Media, through licensee Bicoastal Media Licenses II, LLC.

KURY broadcasts an adult standards music format. In addition to its usual music programming, the station also airs University of Oregon Ducks women's basketball, men's basketball, football, and baseball games as a member of the Oregon Sports Network.

== History ==
This station began regular daytime-only broadcasting on May 2, 1958, as KURY with 500 watts of power on 910 kHz. KURY was originally owned and operated by Joseph F. Sheridan with Norman Oberst serving as the station's first general manager. The station increased its coverage area with a boost to 1,000 watts of power in 1960 but remained a daytime-only station.

The station was acquired by Norman Oberst's KURY Radio, Inc., on November 1, 1964. After nearly 30 years of ownership, Norman Oberst applied to the FCC to transfer control of KURY Radio, Inc., to Dorothy J. Garvin in January 1993. The transfer was approved by the FCC on February 24, 1993, and the transaction was consummated on the same day.

KURY Radio, Inc., reached an agreement in February 2005 to sell this station and KURY-FM to Eureka Broadcasting Co., Inc. (Hugo Papstein, president) for a reported price of $775,000. The deal was approved by the FCC on April 19, 2005, and the transaction was consummated on May 5, 2005. At the time of the sale, KURY broadcast a nostalgia format.

Effective January 31, 2020, Eureka Broadcasting sold KURY, KURY-FM and translator K287CF to Bicoastal Media for $500,000.
