= Kuri, India =

Village in Uttar Pradesh, India

Coordinates: 26°37′N 70°43′E

Kuri is a village in Mirzapur, Uttar Pradesh, India.
