= Kuri, Varanasi =

Village in Uttar Pradesh, India

Coordinates: 29°43′N 77°37′E

Kuri is a village in Pindra tehsil, Varanasi district, Uttar Pradesh, India.
