= Kori Inkpen =

Canadian computer scientist

Kori Marie Inkpen (also published as Kori Inkpen Quinn) is a Canadian computer scientist specializing in human-computer interaction at Microsoft Research. A consistent theme of her research has been the interaction of children with computers.

Inkpen is a 1992 graduate of Dalhousie University, and completed her Ph.D. in 1997 at the University of British Columbia (UBC). At UBC, she credits Maria Klawe and a project led by Klawe on educational electronic games for sparking her interest in human-computer interaction and encouraging her to continue in academic computer science. Her dissertation, Adapting the Human-Computer Interface to Support Collaborative Learning Environments, was jointly supervised by Klawe and Kellogg S. Booth.

After postdoctoral research at the University of Washington, she was a faculty member at Simon Fraser University from 1998 to 2001 and at Dalhousie University from 2001 to 2007 before joining Microsoft in 2008.

In 2017 the Canadian Human-Computer Communications Society gave her their CHCCS/SCDHM Achievement Award "for her many contributions to the field of human-computer interaction, especially her work on collaboration technologies".
