= Sanjaya Sinh =

Indian politician (born 1951)

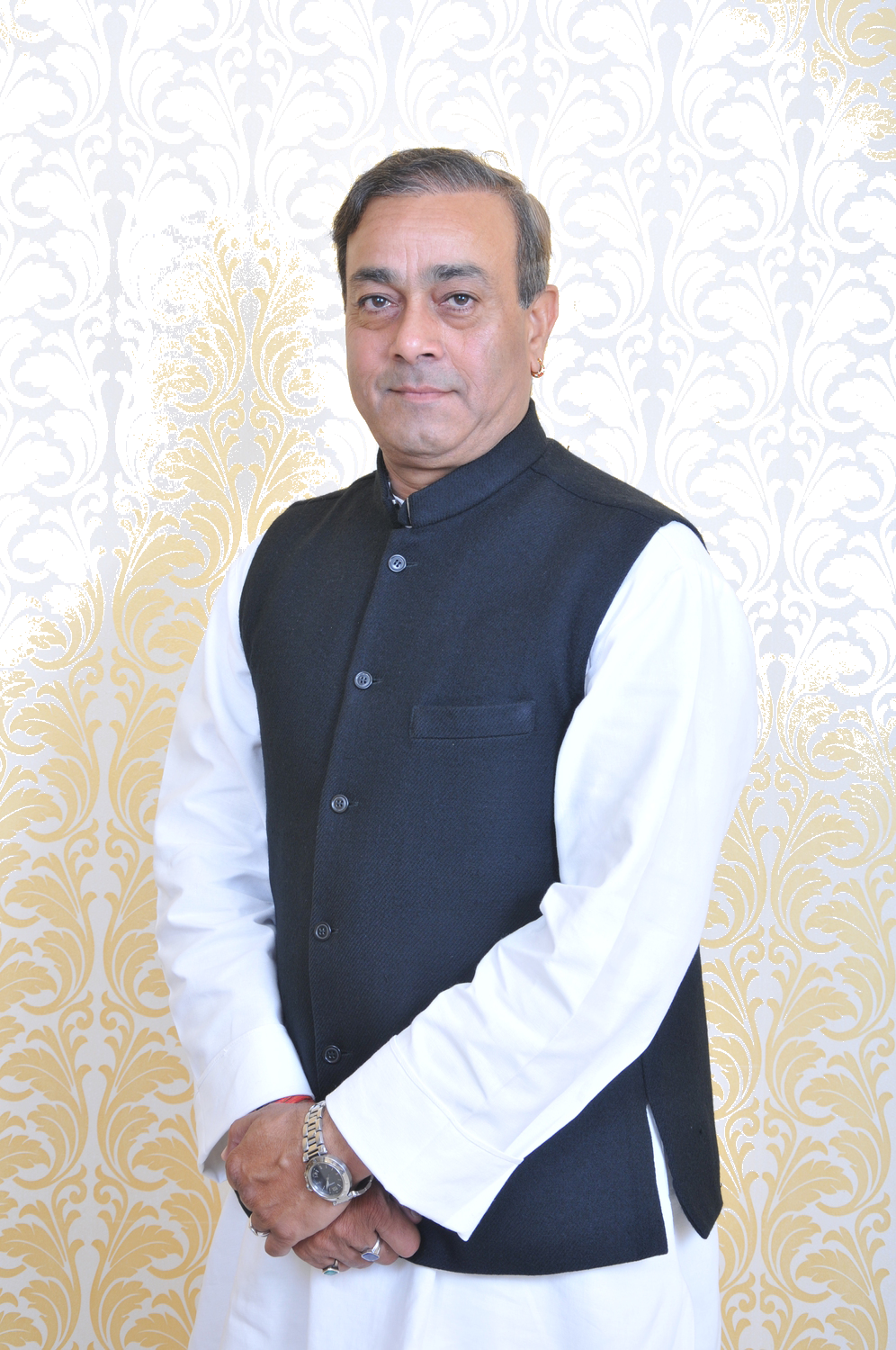

Member of Parliament, Rajya Sabha
- In office 10 April 2014 – 30 July 2019
- Constituency: Assam

Member of Parliament, Lok Sabha
- In office 16 May 2009 – 16 May 2014
- Preceded by: Mohammad Tahir Khan
- Succeeded by: Varun Gandhi
- Constituency: Sultanpur
- In office 10 March 1998 – 26 April 1999
- Preceded by: Satish Sharma
- Succeeded by: Sonia Gandhi
- Constituency: Amethi

Personal details
- Born: 25 September 1951 (age 75) Amethi, Uttar Pradesh, India
- Party: Bharatiya Janata Party
- Other political affiliations: Indian National Congress (till July 2019)
- Spouses: Garima Singh (m. 1973; div. 1995); Ameeta Singh (m. 1995)
- Children: 4
- Parent: Raja Rananjay Singh (father)
- Education: Awadh University
- Occupation: Politician, social worker
- Pretender information
- Title(s): Raja of Amethi
- Throne(s) claimed: Amethi
- Pretend from: 1988–Present
- Monarchy abolished: Sovereign Monarchy; 1947 (Instrument of Accession); Titular Monarchy; 1971 (26th Amendment of the Indian Constitution)
- Last monarch: Raja Bhagwan Baksh Singh

Sanjaya Sinh (born 25 September 1951), also known as Sanjay Singh, is an Indian politician and a former member of the Rajya Sabha. He was twice elected to the Legislative Assembly of Uttar Pradesh during the 1980s and held state ministerial posts. In 1990, he became a member of the upper house of the Parliament of India, which is known as the Rajya Sabha, and in 1998 he was elected to the lower house, called the Lok Sabha. His term in the 12th Lok Sabha session lasted until 1999. In 2009, he was successful in obtaining a second term in that house as a member of the 15th Lok Sabha representing the Sultanpur constituency of Uttar Pradesh. He represented the state of Assam in the Rajya Sabha. He resigned from Rajya Sabha and Indian National Congress to join Bharatiya Janata Party on 30 July 2019.

Singh has held various ministerial portfolios and committee positions over the years, including as Union Minister for Communications in 1991.

== Background ==
Sanjay Sinh was born on 26 September 1951 in Amethi, Uttar Pradesh. Sinh belongs to the erstwhile royal family of Amethi and is the current head of the Bandhalgoti clan of Rajputs. His father was Raja Rananjay Singh. He married his first wife Garima Singh in 1973, with whom he has a son and two daughters. He obtained a decree of divorce with Garima in 1995. However the decree was annulled by the Allahabad High Court on appeal and later by the Supreme Court of India. He married the widow of Badminton player Syed Modi, Ameeta Singh in April 1995. He also adopted Ameeta's daughter from her previous marriage.

A part of his education was at the city's Ranvir Rananjay Post-Graduate College and he gained an MA in Hindi and a PhD from Awadh University.

Aside from his involvement in politics, he has listed his professions as being an agriculturalist, pilot and a social worker. He holds the rank of Major (retired) in the Indian Territorial Army and also has a private pilot's licence.

== Political career ==
Singh had lent support to Sanjay Gandhi when that member of the Nehru-Gandhi family had chosen to contest the Amethi constituency in the elections of 1980. The Amethi area has strong links to the Nehru-Gandhi family and at that time the neighbouring constituency of Rae Bareli was held by Sanjay's mother, Indira Gandhi. He subsequently became a friend of Rajiv Gandhi, who succeeded Sanjay as the representative for Amethi.

His association with the Gandhi family "shot [him] into political limelight", according to The Times of India. However, Singh left the Gandhi-led Indian National Congress (INC) party in 1988 and joined Janata Dal, which was led by Vishwanath Pratap Singh, a relative of his first wife Garima. Despite a general mood favouring Janata Dal, Singh was heavily defeated by the incumbent MP of Amethi, Rajiv Gandhi.

He later changed his allegiance to that of the Bharatiya Janata Party (BJP) and in the 1998 Lok Sabha elections he won the Amethi constituency seat. Although Singh stood again as the BJP candidate in the elections of 1999, when he faced a challenge from the widow of Rajiv Gandhi, Sonia, who defeated Singh.

He rejoined the INC in 2003, choosing to announce his move on the birth anniversary of Rajiv Gandhi. He gained a second term as a member of the lower house of the Parliament of India in the elections of 2009.

The Lok Sabha profile shows that he has held the following positions:

- Member, Uttar Pradesh Legislative Assembly (two terms) 1980–1989
- Minister of State, Forests, Animal Husbandry and Dairy Development, Sports and Youth Welfare, Government of Uttar Pradesh 1982–1985
- Minister of Transport, Uttar Pradesh 1985–1987
- Member of the Rajya Sabha 1990
- Union Minister, Communications, 1990–1991
- Elected Member of the 12th Lok Sabha, 1998. BJP candidate from Amethi
- Member of the Committee on Human Resource Development and its sub-committee on Value Based Education 1998–1999
- Member of the Consultative Committee, Ministry of Defence 1998–1999.
- Member, Joint Committee on Offices of Profit Member, 1998–1999
- Lost to Sonia Gandhi in 1999 as BJP candidate from Amethi
- Elected to 15th Lok Sabha (second term) 2009. Congress member from Sultanpur
- Member, Committee on Rural Development. 31 August 2009
- Member, Committee on Petitions. 23 September 2009
- Member, Consultative Committee, Ministry of Health & Family Welfare. 23 September 2009
- Member, Consultative Committee, Ministry of Civil Aviation. 23 September 2009
- Congress Party Rajya Sabha Member, from Assam, 2014–2019.
- Came third, with only 41,000 votes, as Congress candidate from Sultanpur
- Joined BJP in July 2019.

He served from 1 September 2015 to 30 July 2019 as a member of the Parliamentary Standing Committee on Chemicals and Fertilizers. He resigned from Rajya Sabha and Indian National Congress to join the Bharatiya Janata Party on 30 July 2019.

== Community involvements ==
He has noted "games and sports" as his "favourite pastime and recreation" and that his special interests are flying, riding, shooting and swimming. As of the 15th Lok Sabha, he was president of the Uttar Pradesh Hockey Association and of the Uttar Pradesh Football Sangh, as well as vice-president of the All India Football Federation. At that time he was also a member of clubs in Lucknow and New Delhi and was serving on the governing body of the Sports Authority of India. Other involvements included the Delhi Development Authority and the Siri Fort Sports Complex in New Delhi.

Singh has an interest in the upliftment of disadvantaged rural populations. and he founded the Rajarshi Rananjay Sinh Jan Kalyan Samiti, which operates primarily in the sphere of providing free healthcare. Since 1998, the organisation has also organised mass marriages on an annual basis, which has been described as "pioneering work ... arranging mass marriages of girls of poor people with no distinction based on caste, community, religion or class".

At various times, Singh has served as an officer or president of numerous schools and colleges in Amethi. He has also been chairman of the Pradesik Co-operative Dairy Federation of Uttar Pradesh.

== Controversies ==
=== Murder of Syed Modi ===
Syed Modi, a badminton player who had won numerous national and international titles, was shot dead on 28 July 1988 in Lucknow. The murder attracted worldwide attention. There were suggestions that Modi's wife, Ameeta, was involved in a relationship with Singh, who was a close friend of the couple and at whose house they had married. In late August, the Central Bureau of Investigation (CBI) launched a search of Singh's house. The investigation was urged upon the CBI by the government of Uttar Pradesh and in November 1988, Ameeta Modi, Singh and another politician, Akhilesh Kumar Singh, were charged with conspiracy to commit murder. Four others were charged with the murder itself. Subsequently, Modi, Sanjay Singh and Akilesh Singh successfully challenged the charges laid against them, resulting in the charges against Modi and Sanjay Singh being dropped in September 1990 and those against Akilesh Singh following the same course in 1996. The Supreme Court upheld the rulings of the lower courts.

=== Assault on Sanjay Singh ===
The campaign for November 1989 elections was blighted by large scale violence. Sanjay Singh, campaigning for Janata Dal, was shot at, and had to be hospitalised in serious condition.

=== Disputed divorce and disputed remarriage ===
Singh claims to be married to Modi's widow, Ameeta, but his first wife, Garima, has contested the legitimacy of the marriage. Both the Allahabad High Court and the Supreme Court of India have declared the alleged mutual divorce between herself and Singh in 1995 to be null and void. Singh has accepted the court rulings but denies her claim that they were made because he arranged for an imposter to portray her in the divorce case. Despite the rulings, he maintains that Ameeta is his legally wedded wife.

=== Inheritance dispute ===
In 2014, the marital arrangements resulted in a public dispute regarding property inheritance. Singh and his wife, Ameeta, live at Bhupati Bhawan, a 450-year-old former royal palace in Amethi, Uttar Pradesh, that Garima had to leave around the time of the now-voided divorce. In July 2014, Garima returned to claim the right of inheritance for her son and grandson which she felt was endangered because, she claims, Ameeta had been selling the properties as well as transferring them into the charitable trust headed by her.

On 25 July 2014, Garima Singh reached the palace along with her children. A row developed between her party and people guarding the building, news of which soon spread to nearby villages and attracted people who supported her and her eldest son, Anant Vikram Singh. A fight ensued.

On 14 September 2014 Sanjay and Ameeta were about to enter the palace, where Garima and the children were now living, when clashes erupted between the opposing supporters. Police resorted to a baton charge to control the situation. Several people were severely injured, there were claims of police brutality and a policeman was killed.

During the inheritance dispute, Anant Vikram Singh has demanded a further CBI inquiry into the killing of Syed Modi. Garima Singh and her children claim that the local administration has been working in tandem with Singh and continuously posed obstacles in their way to obtain justice.

== Movie and TV Series ==
Actor and director Dev Anand made a thriller movie based on the murder of Syed Modi. Sau Crore was released in 1991 with the role of Modi being played by Raman Kapoor. The movie was a surprise hit at the box office.

A 2020 ZEE5 web series The Chargesheet: Innocent or Guilty is based on the sensational murder of Syed Modi, though it does not officially acknowledge so, where the characters of Table Tennis player Shiraz Malik, his wife Antara Dixit, politician Ranveer Pratap Singh and his wife Chitrangada Singh prime-facie very apparently resemble Badminton player Syed Modi, his wife Amita Singh, then Amita Modi, Sanjay Sinh and his wife Garima Singh.
