= Ashok Kori =

Indian politician

Ashokkumar Dalbahadur Kori
- अशोककुमार दलबहादुर कोरी

Member of the Uttar Pradesh legislative assembly
- Incumbent
- Assumed office 2022
- President: Draupadi Murmu
- Prime Minister: Narendra Modi
- Preceded by: Dal Bahadur Kori
- Constituency: Salon

Personal details
- Born: Ashok Kumar Kori Salon, Rai Bareli district, Uttar Pradesh, India
- Citizenship: Indian
- Party: Bhartiya Janata Party
- Parent: Dal Bahadur Kori (father)
- Occupation: Politician
- Profession: Social Worker

Ashokkumar Dalbahadur Kori is an Indian politician, Social Worker and current Member of legislative assembly for Salon constituency of Uttar Pradesh. He belongs to tanbina gotra of Kori/koli caste. He won the 2022 Uttar Pradesh legislative assembly election by defeating the Samajwadi Party candidate and he is son of former MLA Dal Bahadur Kori who died on 6 May 2021 because of COVID-19.
