= Kori Bernards =

American businesswoman

- Education: Regis University (B.A.)
- Occupation: Communications executive
- Known for: Communications roles at Universal Pictures and the Motion Picture Association of America

Kori Bernards is the media strategist and trade and business press contact for Universal Pictures. Prior to being appointed to her position at Universal, Bernards was the Vice President of Corporate Communications for the Motion Picture Association of America (MPAA), headquartered in Los Angeles. She is the head of public relations and communications for the west coast and the principal spokeswoman in enforcing copyright protection for the MPAA. She is known to the public as a result of suing online copyright infringement hubs, including several popular BitTorrent trackers.

== Education ==
Bernards earned a B.A. in political science from Regis University.

== Career ==
=== Political communications ===
Bernards worked in U.S. Democratic Party politics and government communications, including as communications director for the Democratic Congressional Campaign Committee during the 2004 election cycle and as press secretary for House Democratic Leader Dick Gephardt. Before working for Gephardt, Bernards was communications director for Congressman David R. Obey of Wisconsin for four-and-a-half years, and as press secretary for the House Appropriations Committee Democrats. She also worked in the office of Rosa DeLauro and in the U.S. Department of Health and Human Services under Secretary Donna Shalala, and as a senior political and communications aide to Nancy Pelosi.

=== Motion Picture Association of America ===
In 2005, Bernards was appointed vice president of corporate communications at the MPAA. As a spokesperson for MPAA, she participated in litigation against file-sharing services and BitTorrent websites. She was also quoted in a dispute over the MPAA's copying of the documentary This Film Is Not Yet Rated.

=== Universal Pictures ===
In 2008, Bernards joined Universal Pictures in a senior communications role, serving as a key media strategist and spokesperson for the studio. She left Universal Pictures in July 2015.

== Personal life ==
Bernards is a native Californian who grew up in Orange County. Before going to Washington, D.C., she worked in Phoenix, Arizona, on several local and state campaigns, including the Clinton-Gore Arizona campaign in 1992. She has a Bachelor of Arts in political science degree from Regis University, Denver, Colorado.
