= Kuri, Bushehr =

Kuri كوري
- Village
- Location within Iran
- Coordinates: 27°50′30″N 52°18′30″E
- Country: Iran
- Province: Bushehr
- County: Jam
- Bakhsh: Central
- Rural District: Jam

Population (2006)
  - Total: 404
- Time zone: UTC+3:30 (IRST)
  - Summer (DST): UTC+4:30 (IRDT)

Kuri (Persian: كوري, also Romanized as Kūrī; also known as Korī) is a village in Jam Rural District, in the Central District of Jam County, Bushehr Province, Iran. At the 2006 census, its population was 404, in 82 families.
