= Sau Crore =

1991 film by Dev Anand

- Promotional poster
- Directed by: Dev Anand
- Produced by: Dev Anand
- Starring: Dev Anand; Naseeruddin Shah; Raman Kapoor; Fatima Sheikh; Kiran Kumar; Anupam Kher
- Music by: Bappi Lahiri
- Release date: 1991
- Country: India
- Language: Hindi

Sau Crore (lit. 'Hundred crores') is a 1991 Indian film starring, produced and directed by Dev Anand. It also debuts newcomers Fatima Sheikh and Raman Kapoor. The movie is based on the story of Indian Badminton Player Syed Modi, who was shot dead on 28 July 1988 in Lucknow as he came out of the K. D. Singh Babu Stadium after a practice session. The murder sent shock waves through India, especially after the police filed murder charges against Modi's wife Ameeta Modi and her lover (and future husband) Raja Sanjay Singh of Amethi, who was a prominent politician belonging to the Congress Party. The role of Syed Modi was played by Raman Kapoor and the politician was played by (Naseeruddin Shah).

== Plot ==
After her husband Raj (Raman Kapoor) is murdered, Kamlesh (Fatima Sheikh) receives a shock and doesn't speak for days. The cause of this is that she indeed witnessed her husband's murder. But who did murder Raj? Was it really the politician Somnath (Naseeruddin Shah) who fell in love with Kamlesh and wanted to marry her? Was it a plot created by Somnath's rival candidate Mohanbhai (Anupam Kher) to win the elections? Or was it Kamlesh herself who wanted to leave Raj and run off with Somnath? It's up to CBI Inspector Kumar (Dev Anand) to find out.

== Music ==
Lyrics: Suraj Sanim

Song	Singer
"Pyar Ke Liye"	Lata Mangeshkar
"Desi Dhoon, Videsi Taal"	Udit Narayan; Kumar Sanu; Asha Bhosle
"Naye Zamane Ki Hoon"	Anuradha Paudwal; Amit Kumar
"Hum Honge Sau Crore"	Amit Kumar; Shabbir Kumar; Uttara Kelkar
"Pyar Mein" - 1	Ananya Mukherjee
"Pyar Mein" - 2	Ananya Mukherjee
