= Gayatri Prasad Prajapati =

Indian politician

Gayatri Prasad Prajapati is a former Indian politician belonging to the Samajwadi Party and a convicted criminal. He was convicted of rape, criminal conspiracy, and criminal intimidation. In 2021, he was sentenced to a five-year prison sentence by the Allahabad High Court. He was a former cabinet minister in the government of Uttar Pradesh and served as Minister of Transport. He also served as a mining minister.

== Early life ==
Prajapati was born in a poor Kumhar family from Amethi. He established Gayadai College there.

== Allegations ==
On a complaint filed by activist and advocate Nutan Thakur, Prajapati was under the Lokayukta scanner for corruption in illegal mining. Later Nutan Thakur's husband ex IPS officer and Present, Adhikar Sena alleged that ex Uttar Pradesh Chief Minister Mulayam Singh Yadav threatened him for his wife's Lokayukta case against Prajapati. Nutan Thakur also registered a criminal case against Prajapati for framing her and her husband in a false rape case, which is presently under trial before a Lucknow Court. On 17 February 2017, the Supreme Court of India directed Uttar Pradesh police to lodge a complaint in connection with a rape case.

He was arrested in Lucknow on March 15, 2017 after an escape on February 27, 2017.

In 2016, the Allahabad High Court charged him with allowing illegal mining in his capacity of mining minister in Shamli, Hamirpur, Fatehpur, Siddharthnagar, Deoria, Kaushambi and Saharanpur — in violation of rules and ban by the National Green Tribunal.

=== Rape ===
In February 2017, a woman from Chitrakoot, alleged that Prajapati had raped her three years previously. Prajapati reportedly took photos and continued to rape her for two years by threatening to leak the photos. He also falsely promised to give her an important position in Party.

While the victim later filed a complaint, the Uttar Pradesh Police refused to file an FIR on the orders of Mulayam Singh Yadav. The woman then approached Supreme Court, which ordered the police to lodge a report. In February 2017, he was found to be absconding, but was arrested a month later in Lucknow.

On 12 November 2021, Prajapati was sentenced to life imprisonment by MP-MLA court in Lucknow.
