= Corey =

- Gender: Male
- Language: Greek, Gaelic, Latin

Other names
- Related names: Cory, Cora, Coire, Corie, Corrie, Curry (surname), Correy, Cori, Kory (given name), Khouri, Kori, Korie, Corro, Corrado

Corey is a masculine given name and a surname. It is a masculine version of name Cora, which has Greek origins and is the maiden name of the goddess Persephone. The name also can have origins from the Gaelic word coire, which means "in a cauldron" or "in a hollow".

As a surname, it has a number of possible derivations, including an Old Norse personal name Kori of uncertain meaning, which is found in Scandinavia and England, often meaning curly haired. As an Irish surname it comes from Ó Comhraidhe (descendant of Comhraidheh). Notable people or fictional characters named Corey include:

== First name ==
=== A ===
- Corey Adam (born 1981), American stand-up comedian
- Corey Adams (born 1996), Australian rugby player
- Corey Adamson (born 1992), Australian baseball and football player
- Corey Allan (born 1998), Australian rugby player
- Corey Allen (1934–2010), American film and television director
- Corey Anderson (disambiguation), multiple people
- Corey Arnold (born 1976), American photographer
- Corey Ashe (born 1986), American soccer player

=== B ===
- Corey Baird (born 1996), American soccer player
- Corey Baker (baseball) (born 1989), Israeli-American baseball player
- Corey Baker (choreographer) (born 1990), New Zealand choreographer
- Corey Ballentine (born 1996), American football player
- Corey Barber Jr. (born 2008), American football player
- Corey Beaulieu (born 1983), American guitar player
- Corey Beck (born 1971), American basketball player
- Corey Bell (born 1973), Australian rules footballer
- Corey Benjamin (born 1978), American basketball player
- Corey Black (born 1969), American jockey
- Corey Bojorquez (born 1996), American football player
- Corey Bradford (born 1975), American football player
- Corey Bramlet (born 1983), American football player
- Corey Loog Brennan (born 1959), guitarist, songwriter, and academic
- Corey Brewer (born 1986), American basketball player
- Corey Brown (disambiguation), multiple people
- Corey Brunish (born 1955), American singer and actor
- Corey Bullock (born 2001), American football player
- Corey Burton (born 1955), American voice actor

=== C ===
- Corey Cadby (born 1995), Australian darts player
- Corey Carrier (born 1980), American actor
- Corey Cerovsek (born 1972), Canadian violinist and mathematician
- Corey Chavous (born 1976), American football player
- Corey Clark (born 1980), American singer
- Corey Clement (born 1994), American football player
- Corey Cogdell (born 1986), American trapshooter
- Corey Coleman (born 1994), American football player
- Corey Collins (born 2001), American football player
- Corey Collymore (born 1977), West Indies cricketer
- Corey Comperatore (1974–2024), American firefighter and victim of Trump assassination attempt in Pennsylvania
- Corey Conners (born 1992), Canadian golfer
- Corey Corbin (born 1969), American politician
- Corey Cott (born 1990), American actor and singer
- Corey Crawford (born 1984), Canadian ice hockey player
- Corey Croom (born 1971), American football player
- Corey Crowder (born 1969), American basketball player

=== D ===
- Corey Dailey (born 2007), American football player
- Corey Davis (disambiguation), multiple people
- Corey DeAngelis, American political activist
- Corey Deuel (born 1977), American pocket billiards player
- Corey Dickerson (born 1989), American baseball player
- Corey Dillon (born 1974), American football player
- Corey Domachowski (born 1996), Welsh rugby player
- Corey Duffel (born 1984), American skateboarder

=== E ===
- Corey Edwards (born 1983), Barbadian cricketer
- Corey Elkins (born 1985), American ice hockey player
- Corey Ellis (footballer) (born 1996), Australian footballer
- Corey Enright (born 1981), Australian footballer

=== F ===
- Corey Feldman (born 1971), American actor
- Corey Fischer (1945–2020), American actor
- Corey Fisher (born 1988), American basketball player
- Corey Flintoff (born 1946), American news correspondent
- Corey Ford (1902–1969), American humorist and author
- Corey Foster (born 1969), Canadian ice hockey player
- Corey Fuller (born 1990), American football player

=== G ===
- Corey Gaines (born 1965), American basketball player and coach
- Corey Glasgow (born 1979), Barbadian cricketer
- Corey Glover (born 1964), American musician, Living Colour
- Corey Goff (born 1973), American athletic director, baseball and football coach
- Corey Graham (born 1985), American football player
- Corey Grant (born 1991), American football player
- Corey Graves (born 1984), American wrestling announcer
- Corey Gault (born 1992), Australian footballer

=== H ===
- Corey Haim (1971–2010), Canadian actor
- Corey Hall (American football) (born 1979), American football player
- Corey Hall (rugby league) (born 2002), American rugby player
- Corey Harawira-Naera (born 1995), New Zealand rugby player
- Corey Harris (disambiguation), multiple people
- Corey Harrison (born 1983), American businessman
- Corey Hart (disambiguation), multiple people
- Corey Harwell, American neuroscientist
- Corey Hawkins (born 1988), American actor
- Corey Hebert (born 1969), American journalist and physician
- Corey Hetherman, American football player and coach
- Corey Heim (born 2002), American racing driver
- Corey Hertzog (born 1990), American soccer player
- Corey Hill (1978–2015), American mixed martial artist
- Corey Hilliard (born 1985), American football player
- Corey Hirsch (born 1972), Canadian ice hockey player
- Corey Hogan (born 1981), Canadian politician
- Corey Holcomb (born 1968), American comedian
- Corey Hughes (born 1978), Australian rugby player
- Corey Hulsey (born 1977), American football player

=== I ===
- Corey Ivy (born 1977), American football player

=== J ===
- Corey Jackson (disambiguation), multiple people
- Corey James (born 1992), English disc jockey
- Corey Jenkins (born 1976), American football player
- Corey Jensen (born 1994), Australian rugby player
- Corey Johnson (disambiguation), multiple people
- Corey Jones (born 1981), Australian footballer
- Corey Jordan (born 1999), English footballer
- Corey Julks (born 1996), American baseball player

=== K ===
- Corey Kelly (born 2000), Australian cricketer
- Corey Kiner (born 2002), American football player
- Corey Kispert (born 1999), American basketball player
- Corey Kluber (born 1986), American baseball player
- Corey Knebel (born 1991), American baseball player
- Corey Koskie (born 1973), American baseball player

=== L ===
- Corey LaJoie (born 1991), American racing driver
- Corey Lanerie (born 1974), American jockey
- Corey William Large (born 1975), Canadian writer and actor
- Corey Layton (born 1979), Australian radio broadcaster
- Corey Lee (baseball) (born 1974), American baseball player
- Corey Lee (chef) (born 1977), Korean-American chef
- Corey Lemonier (born 1991), American football player
- Corey Levin (born 1994), American football player
- Corey Lewandowski (born 1973), American political lobbyist
- Corey Lewis, American comic book creator
- Corey Lewis, (born 1991), American racing driver
- Corey Linsley (born 1991), American football player
- Corey Littrell (born 1992), American baseball player
- Corey Liuget (born 1990), American football player
- Corey Locke (born 1984), Canadian ice hockey player
- Corey Louchiey (born 1971), American football player
- Corey Lowery (born 1973), American musician and songwriter
- Corey Luciano (born 1998), American football player
- Corey Lynch (born 1985), American football player

=== M ===
- Corey Mace (born 1985), Canadian football player
- Corey Maclin (1970–2013), American television broadcaster
- Corey Maggette (born 1979), American basketball player
- Corey Makelim (born 1994), American rugby player
- Corey Marks (born 1989), Canadian rock and country singer
- Corey Martin, American Air Force general
- Corey May, American video game writer
- Corey Mayfield (born 1970), American football player
- Corey Mays (born 1983), American football player
- Corey L. Maze (born 1978), American judge
- Corey McPherrin (born 1955), American news anchor
- Corey Mesler (born 1955), American writer
- Corey Miller (disambiguation), multiple people
- Corey Moore (born 1979), American football player
- Corey Moore (safety) (born 1993), American football player
- Corey Muirhead (born 1983), American basketball player

=== N ===
- Corey Nakatani (born 1970), American jockey
- Corey Nelson (born 1992), American football player
- Corey Norman (born 1991), Australian rugby player

=== O ===
- Corey Oates (born 1994), Australian rugby player
- Corey O'Brien (born 1973), American lawyer and politician
- Corey O'Keeffe (born 1998), English footballer
- Corey Oswalt (born 1993), American baseball player

=== P ===
- Corey Page (born 1975), Australian actor
- Corey Paris (born 1991), American politician
- Corey Parker (disambiguation), multiple people
- Corey Patterson (born 1979), American baseball player
- Corey Paul (born 1987), American hip hop musician
- Corey Pavin (born 1959), American golfer
- Corey Pearson (born 1973), Australian rugby player
- Corey Perry (born 1985), Canadian ice hockey player
- Corey Peters (born 1988), American football player
- Corey Postiglione (born 1942), American artist and art critic
- Corey Potter (born 1984), American ice hockey player
- Corey S. Powell (born 1966), American science writer and journalist
- Corey Pullig (born 1973), American football player

=== R ===
- Corey Rae, American transgender rights activist
- Corey Ragsdale (born 1982), American baseball coach
- Corey Raji (born 1988), American-Nigerian basketball player
- Corey Ray (born 1994), American baseball player
- Corey Raymond (born 1969), American football coach
- Corey Reynolds (born 1974), American musical and film actor
- Corey Robin (born 1967), American political theorist and journalist
- Corey Robinson (disambiguation), multiple people
- Corey Rodriguez (born 1979), American boxer
- Corey Rosenlee, American politician

=== S ===
- Corey Sanders (disambiguation), multiple people
- Corey Sawyer (born 1971), American football player
- Corey Schwab (born 1970), Canadian ice hockey player
- Corey Scott (1968–1997), American stunt artist and motorcycle rider
- Corey Seager (born 1994), American baseball player
- Corey Sevier (born 1984), Canadian actor
- Corey Simon (born 1977), American football player
- Corey Small (born 1987), Canadian lacrosse player
- Corey Smith (disambiguation), multiple people
- Corey Stapleton (born 1967), American politician
- Corey Stevens (born 1954), American blues guitarist
- Corey Stewart (born 1968), American politician
- Corey Stoll (born 1976), American actor
- Corey Surrency (born 1984), American football player
- Corey Swinson (1969–2013), American football player

=== T ===
- Corey Taylor (born 1973), American singer, Slipknot and Stone Sour
- Corey Thomas (American football) (born 1975), American football player
- Corey Thompson (born 1990), Australian rugby player
- Corey Thompson (American football) (born 1993), American football player
- Corey Thornton (born 2001), American football player
- Corey Tochor (born 1977), Canadian politician
- Corey Tutt (born 1992), Australian STEM champion

=== V ===
- Corey Vereen (born 1995), American football player
- Corey Vidal (born 1986), Canadian YouTuber
- Corey Vinson (born 1997), American basketball player and coach

=== W ===
- Corey Waddell (born 1996), Australian rugby player
- Corey Walden (born 1992), American basketball player
- Corey D. B. Walker, American political thinker
- Corey Ward (born 1998), American rapper
- Corey Washington (born 1991), American football player
- Corey Webster (born 1982), American football player
- Corey Webster (basketball) (born 1988), New Zealand basketball player
- Corey Wedlock (born 1996), Australian lawn and indoor bowler
- Corey Whelan (born 1997), English-Irish soccer player
- Corey White (American football) (born 1990), American football player
- Corey White (comedian), Australian comedian
- Corey Widmer (born 1968), American football player
- Corey Williams (disambiguation), multiple people
- Corey Woods (disambiguation), multiple people
- Corey Wootton (born 1987), American football player

=== Y ===
- Corey Yuen (born 1951), Hong Kong film director

== Surname ==
Corey

- Albert Corey (1878–1926), French athlete
- Angela Corey (born 1954), American attorney
- Bryan Corey (born 1973), American baseball player
- Cathal Corey, Gaelic football player and manager
- Ed Corey (1894–1970), American baseball player
- Elias James Corey (born 1928), American organic
- Ernest Corey (1891–1972), Australian soldier, the only person to be awarded the Military Medal four times
- Giles Corey (1611–1692) and Martha Corey (1620–1692), husband and wife executed in the Salem witch trials
- Irving Corey (1892–1976), Canadian flying ace in World War I
- "Professor" Irwin Corey (1914–2017), American comedian and actor
- Isabelle Corey (1939–2011), French film actress
- James S. A. Corey, pen name used by collaborating American novelists Daniel Abraham and Ty Franck
- Jeff Corey (1914–2002), American stage and screen actor and director
- Jill Corey (1935–2021), American singer
- Jim Corey (1883–1956), American actor
- John Corey (fl. 1701–1735), English actor
- Katherine Corey (fl. 1660–1692), English actress
- Robert Corey (1897–1971), American structural chemist
- Ronald Corey (born 1938), Canadian businessman and ice hockey executive
- Walt Corey (1938–2022), American football player and coach
- Wendell Corey (1914–1968), American actor and politician

Correy

- Trent Correy (born 1985), Canadian film director, screenwriter and animator

== See also ==
- Corey correlation, in relative permeability
- Coree (disambiguation)
- Cori (disambiguation)
- Corie, given name
- Corrie (given name)
- Corrie (surname)
- Corry (surname)
- Cory, given name and surname
- Korey, given name and surname
- Kori (disambiguation)
- Kory (given name)
