= 2011 Detroit Lions season =

82nd season in franchise history

- Owner: William Clay Ford Sr.
- General manager: Martin Mayhew
- Head coach: Jim Schwartz
- Offensive coordinator: Scott Linehan
- Defensive coordinator: Gunther Cunningham
- Home stadium: Ford Field

Results
- Record: 10–6
- Division place: 2nd NFC North
- Playoffs: Lost Wild Card Playoffs (at Saints) 28–45
- All-Pros: WR Calvin Johnson (1st team)
- Pro Bowlers: WR Calvin Johnson

The 2011 season was the Detroit Lions' 82nd in the National Football League (NFL), their 78th as the Detroit Lions, their 10th playing home games at Ford Field and their third under head coach Jim Schwartz. With a regular season record of 10–6, the team improved on their 6–10 record from 2010, making it their third consecutive improved season. It was the Lions' first winning season since 2000 and first 10 win season since 1995. Their 10-win season came just three years after their winless 2008 campaign. The Lions' 5–0 start was their best since 1956. With their win over the San Diego Chargers on December 24, the Lions clinched an NFC Wild Card spot in the postseason. After their loss to the Green Bay Packers in Week 17, it was determined the Lions would play the New Orleans Saints in one of the NFC Wild Card Games, which the Lions lost 45–28. It was their first playoff berth since 1999.

The Lions ran a pass-heavy offense in 2011, mainly due to early injuries of running backs Mikel Leshoure, who was injured in the preseason and Jahvid Best, who was injured with a concussion in week 6 against the 49ers. Kevin Smith was signed in November as running back, but he too was injured, this time a high ankle sprain during week 11 that inhibited his running. Quarterback Matthew Stafford's 663 passing attempts (41.4 attempts per game) led the league, and they only ran the ball on 33.8% of their plays, a league low. According to statistics site Football Outsiders, the Lions went into shotgun formation a league-leading 68% of offensive plays in 2011. Stafford became only the fourth quarterback to pass for 5,000 yards in a season, and his 5,038 yards passing are 5th-most in NFL history (though only 3rd in the 2011 NFL season).

The 474 points that the Lions scored in 2011 were the most in franchise history, until surpassed by the 2024 team, and only the second time that the team had scored 400+ points in a season.

== Offseason ==
=== Offseason signings ===
Pos	Player	Tag	2010 Team	Signed
SS	Erik Coleman	UFA	Atlanta Falcons	February 18
WR	Rashied Davis	UFA	Chicago Bears	July 29
OLB	Justin Durant	UFA	Jacksonville Jaguars	July 29
CB	Maurice Leggett	RFA	Kansas City Chiefs	July 29
DT	Quinn Pitcock	RFA	Seattle Seahawks	July 29
CB	Eric Wright	UFA	Cleveland Browns	July 29
MLB	Stephen Tulloch	UFA	Tennessee Titans	July 31
RB	Jerome Harrison	UFA	Philadelphia Eagles	August 9

=== Draft ===
2011 Detroit Lions draft
Round	Pick	Player	Position	College	Notes
1	13	Nick Fairley	DT	Auburn	
2	44	Titus Young	WR	Boise St	
2	57	Mikel Leshoure	RB	Illinois	
5	157	Doug Hogue	LB	Syracuse	
7	209	Johnny Culbreath	OT	South Carolina St	
Made roster † Pro Football Hall of Fame * Made at least one Pro Bowl during career

=== Undrafted free agents ===
Name	Position	College
Daunte Akra	Linebacker	Wayne State
Dominique Barnes	Wide receiver	Youngstown State
Branden Bufford	Cornerback	Howard
Quentin Davie	Linebacker	Northwestern
Preston Dial	Tight end	Alabama
Ryan Donahue	Punter	Iowa
DeJuan Fulghum	Linebacker	Texas Southern
Marcus Harris	Wide receiver	Murray State
Jared Jenkins	Wide receiver	Wisconsin-Stevens Point
Pat Illig	Guard	Wofford
Jeff Maddux	Guard	Central Michigan
Cobrani Mixon	Linebacker	Kent State
Ricardo Silva	Safety	Hampton
Narada Williams	Defensive end	Fort Valley State

== Regular season transactions ==
On October 18, the Lions attempted to trade running back Jerome Harrison and an undisclosed pick in the 2013 NFL draft to the Philadelphia Eagles for running back Ronnie Brown, but the deal was voided due after Harrison failed his Eagles physical with what Adam Schefter of ESPN reported was a then-undiagnosed brain tumor. Harrison had surgery on October 21 and was placed on the injured reserve list for the remainder of the season. The same day, the Lions signed free agent running back Eldra Buckley to replace Harrison in the lineup.

== Staff ==
Detroit Lions 2011 staff
Front office: Owner/chairman – William Clay Ford Sr.; Vice chairman – William Clay Ford Jr.; President – Tom Lewand; Senior vice president/general manager – Martin Mayhew; Senior personnel executive – James "Shack" Harris; Vice president of football operations – Cedric Saunders; Vice president of pro personnel – Sheldon White; Director of college scouting – Scott McEwen; Assistant director of college scouting/national scout – Lance Newmark; Assistant director of pro personnel – Miller McCalmon; Assistant director of pro personnel – Charlie Sanders; Head coaches: Head coach – Jim Schwartz; Assistant head coach/defensive coordinator – Gunther Cunningham; Offensive coaches: Offensive coordinator – Scott Linehan; Assistant quarterbacks – Todd Downing; Running backs – Sam Gash; Wide receivers – Shawn Jefferson; Tight ends – Tim Lappano; Offensive line – George Yarno; Assistant offensive line – Jeremiah Washburn; Offensive coaching assistant – Kyle Valero	Defensive coaches: Defensive line – Kris Kocurek; Linebackers – Matt Burke; Secondary – Tim Walton; Defensive assistant – Don Clemons; Defensive coaching assistant – Brandon Fisher; Special teams coaches: Special teams coordinator – Danny Crossman; Assistant special teams – Bradford Banta; Strength and conditioning: Coordinator of physical development – Jason Arapoff; Strength and conditioning assistant – Ted Rath

== Final roster ==
2011 Detroit Lions roster
Quarterbacks (QB): 14 Shaun Hill; 9 Matthew Stafford; 5 Drew Stanton; Running backs (RB): 35 Joique Bell; 28 Maurice Morris; 30 Kevin Smith; 34 Keiland Williams; Wide receivers (WR): 13 Nate Burleson; 82 Rashied Davis; 81 Calvin Johnson; 11 Stefan Logan RS; 80 Maurice Stovall; 16 Titus Young; Tight ends (TE): 89 Will Heller; 87 Brandon Pettigrew; 85 Tony Scheffler	Offensive linemen (OL): 76 Jeff Backus T; 77 Gosder Cherilus T; 75 Leonard Davis G; 65 Dylan Gandy G; 78 Corey Hilliard T; 66 Stephen Peterman G; 51 Dominic Raiola C; 67 Rob Sims G; Defensive linemen (DL): 92 Cliff Avril DE; 98 Nick Fairley DT; 96 Andre Fluellen DT; 91 Sammie Lee Hill DT; 94 Lawrence Jackson DE; 90 Ndamukong Suh DT; 93 Kyle Vanden Bosch DE; 99 Corey Williams DT; 79 Willie Young DE	Linebackers (LB): 59 Bobby Carpenter OLB; 52 Justin Durant OLB; 57 Doug Hogue OLB; 54 DeAndre Levy OLB; 58 Ashlee Palmer MLB; 55 Stephen Tulloch MLB; Defensive backs (DB): 32 Aaron Berry CB; 31 Don Carey SS; 26 Louis Delmas FS; 43 Chris Harris FS; 23 Chris Houston CB; 33 Brandon McDonald CB; 39 Ricardo Silva FS; 27 Alphonso Smith CB; 42 Amari Spievey SS; 29 John Wendling SS; 21 Eric Wright CB; Special teams (ST): 2 Ben Graham P; 4 Jason Hanson K; 48 Don Muhlbach LS	Practice squad: 69 Ugo Chinasa DE; 64 Dan Gerberry C; 10 Marcus Harris WR; 86 Nate Hughes WR (IR); 63 Jacques McClendon G; 49 Slade Norris LB; 46 Nathan Overbay TE; 19 Terrence Toliver WR; 38 Ross Weaver CB; Reserve: 44 Jahvid Best RB (IR); 24 Erik Coleman SS (IR); 72 Johnny Culbreath T (IR); 6 Ryan Donahue P (IR); 50 Isaiah Ekejiuba MLB (IR); 70 Jason Fox T (IR); 36 Jerome Harrison RB (NF-Ill.); 25 Mikel Leshoure RB (IR); Rookies in italics 53 active, 9 reserve, 8 practice squad

== Schedule ==
=== Preseason ===
Week	Date	Opponent	Result	Record	Venue	Recap
1	August 12	Cincinnati Bengals	**W** 34–3	1–0	Ford Field	Recap
2	August 19	at Cleveland Browns	**W** 30–28	2–0	Cleveland Browns Stadium	Recap
3	August 27	New England Patriots	**W** 34–10	3–0	Ford Field	Recap
4	September 1	at Buffalo Bills	**W** 16–6	4–0	Ralph Wilson Stadium	Recap

=== Regular season ===
Week	Date	Opponent	Result	Record	Venue	Recap
1	September 11	at Tampa Bay Buccaneers	**W** 27–20	1–0	Raymond James Stadium	Recap
2	September 18	Kansas City Chiefs	**W** 48–3	2–0	Ford Field	Recap
3	September 25	at **Minnesota Vikings**	**W** 26–23 (OT)	3–0	Mall of America Field	Recap
4	October 2	at Dallas Cowboys	**W** 34–30	4–0	Cowboys Stadium	Recap
5	October 10	**Chicago Bears**	**W** 24–13	5–0	Ford Field	Recap
6	October 16	San Francisco 49ers	**L** 19–25	5–1	Ford Field	Recap
7	October 23	Atlanta Falcons	**L** 16–23	5–2	Ford Field	Recap
8	October 30	at Denver Broncos	**W** 45–10	6–2	Sports Authority Field at Mile High	Recap
9	Bye					
10	November 13	at **Chicago Bears**	**L** 13–37	6–3	Soldier Field	Recap
11	November 20	Carolina Panthers	**W** 49–35	7–3	Ford Field	Recap
12	November 24	**Green Bay Packers**	**L** 15–27	7–4	Ford Field	Recap
13	December 4	at New Orleans Saints	**L** 17–31	7–5	Mercedes-Benz Superdome	Recap
14	December 11	**Minnesota Vikings**	**W** 34–28	8–5	Ford Field	Recap
15	December 18	at Oakland Raiders	**W** 28–27	9–5	O.co Coliseum	Recap
16	December 24	San Diego Chargers	**W** 38–10	10–5	Ford Field	Recap
17	January 1	at **Green Bay Packers**	**L** 41–45	10–6	Lambeau Field	Recap

Note: Intra-division opponents are in bold text.

=== Postseason ===
Round	Date	Opponent (seed)	Result	Record	Venue	Recap
Wild Card	January 7, 2012	at New Orleans Saints (3)	**L** 28–45	0–1	Mercedes-Benz Superdome	Recap

== Regular season results ==
=== Standings ===
NFC North
	W	L	T	PCT	DIV	CONF	PF	PA	STK
^{(1)} Green Bay Packers	15	1	0	.938	6–0	12–0	560	359	W2
^{(6)} Detroit Lions	10	6	0	.625	3–3	6–6	474	387	L1
Chicago Bears	8	8	0	.500	3–3	7–5	353	341	W1
Minnesota Vikings	3	13	0	.188	0–6	3–9	340	449	L1

=== Week 1: at Tampa Bay Buccaneers ===
Week One: Detroit Lions at Tampa Bay Buccaneers – Game summary

Quarter	1	2	3	4	Total
Lions	6	14	7	0	27
Buccaneers	10	3	0	7	20

at Raymond James Stadium, Tampa, Florida

- Date: September 11
- Game time: 1:00 PM EDT
- Game weather: 86° F (Sunny)
- Game attendance: 51,274
- Referee: Walt Anderson
- TV announcers (Fox): Chris Myers, Tim Ryan and Jennifer Hale
- Recap
  Gamebook

Game information

First quarter

- DET – Jason Hanson 23-yard field goal, Lions 3–0, Drive: 12 plays, 76 yards, 6:02.
- TB – Connor Barth 38-yard field goal, Tied 3–3, Drive: 4 plays, 1 yard, 1:46.
- TB – Aqib Talib 28-yard interception return (Connor Barth kick), Buccaneers 10–3.
- DET – Jason Hanson 28-yard field goal, Buccaneers 10–6, Drive: 11 plays, 70 yards, 4:55.

Second quarter

- DET – Calvin Johnson 36-yard pass from Matthew Stafford (Jason Hanson kick), Lions 13–10, Drive: 6 plays, 80 yards, 3:08.
- DET – Tony Scheffler 11-yard pass from Matthew Stafford (Jason Hanson kick), Lions 20–10, Drive: 8 plays, 84 yards, 4:23.
- TB – Connor Barth 31-yard field goal, Lions 20–13, Drive: 9 plays, 67 yards, 1:16.

Third quarter

- DET – Calvin Johnson 1-yard pass from Matthew Stafford (Jason Hanson kick), Lions 27–13, Drive: 11 plays, 70 yards, 6:30.

Fourth quarter

- TB – Mike Williams 7-yard pass from Josh Freeman (Connor Barth kick), Lions 27–20, Drive: 11 plays, 59 yards, 3:52.

Top passers

- DET – Matthew Stafford – 24/33, 305 yards, 3 touchdowns, 1 interception
- TB – Josh Freeman – 28/43, 259 yards, 1 touchdown, 1 interception

Top rushers

- DET – Jahvid Best – 21 rushes, 72 yards
- TB – Josh Freeman – 4 rushes, 26 yards

Top receivers

- DET – Calvin Johnson – 6 receptions, 88 yards, 2 touchdowns
- TB – Kellen Winslow – 6 receptions, 66 yards

Top tacklers

- DET – Amari Spievey – 7 tackles
- TB – Geno Hayes – 8 tackles

To start the season, the Lions traveled south to Tampa, Florida to take on the Tampa Bay Buccaneers. The Lions scored first in the first quarter with a 23-yard field goal by Jason Hanson. The Buccaneers tied it up with a 38-yard field goal by Connor Barth, then took the lead when Aqib Talib intercepted a pass from Matthew Stafford and ran it in 28 yards. The Lions responded with a 28-yard field goal. In the second quarter, Detroit took the lead with a 36-yard touchdown catch by Calvin Johnson, and later added more points when Tony Scheffler caught an 11-yard TD pass. Tampa Bay responded with a 31-yard field goal just before halftime. The second half was relatively quiet, with each team only scoring one touchdown. First, Detroit's Calvin Johnson caught a 1-yard pass in the third quarter. The game's final points came when Mike Williams of Tampa Bay caught a 5-yard pass. The Lions won their regular season opener for the first time since 2007.

=== Week 2: vs. Kansas City Chiefs ===
Week Two: Kansas City Chiefs at Detroit Lions – Game summary

Quarter	1	2	3	4	Total
Chiefs	3	0	0	0	3
Lions	7	13	7	21	48

at Ford Field, Detroit, Michigan

- Date: September 18
- Game time: 1:00 PM EDT
- Game weather: Played indoors (domed stadium)
- Game attendance: 60,040
- Referee: Tony Corrente
- TV announcers (CBS): Don Criqui and Randy Cross
- Recap
  Gamebook

Game information

First quarter

- DET – Calvin Johnson 15-yard pass from Matthew Stafford (Jason Hanson kick), Lions 7–0, Drive: 2 plays, 56 yards, 0:43.
- KC – Ryan Succop 33-yard field goal, Lions 7–3, Drive: 7 plays, 65 yards, 2:50.

Second quarter

- DET – Tony Scheffler 36-yard pass from Matthew Stafford (Jason Hanson kick), Lions 14–3, Drive: 2 plays, 45 yards, 0:28.
- DET – Jason Hanson 51-yard field goal, Lions 17–3, Drive: 7 plays, 40 yards, 3:24.
- DET – Jason Hanson 28-yard field goal, Lions 20–3, Drive: 5 plays, 29 yards, 0:24

Third quarter

- DET – Calvin Johnson 1-yard pass from Matthew Stafford (Jason Hanson kick), Lions 27–3, Drive: 10 plays, 84 yards, 4:53.

Fourth quarter

- DET – Jahvid Best 9-yard pass from Matthew Stafford, Lions 34–3, Drive: 5 plays, 23 yards, 1:11.
- DET – Jahvid Best 1-yard run (Jason Hanson kick), Lions 41–3, Drive: 6 plays, 18 yards, 2:37.
- DET – Keiland Williams 1-yard run (Jason Hanson kick), Lions 48–3, Drive: 7 plays, 34 yards, 3:40.

Top passers

- KC – Matt Cassel – 15/22, 133 yards, 0 touchdowns, 3 interceptions
- DET – Matthew Stafford – 23/39, 294 yards, 4 touchdowns, 1 interception

Top rushers

- KC – Dexter McCluster – 8 carries, 51 yards
- DET – Jahvid Best – 16 carries, 57 yards, 1 touchdown

Top receivers

- KC – Dwayne Bowe – 5 receptions, 101 yards
- DET – Nate Burleson – 7 receptions, 93 yards

Top tacklers

- KC – Jon McGraw – 5 tackles, 5 assists
- DET – Justin Durant – 8 tackles, 3 assists

For their home opener, the Lions hosted the Kansas City Chiefs. The Lions scored first when Calvin Johnson caught a 15-yard pass for a touchdown. Kansas City then scored their only points of the game with a 33-yard field goal by Ryan Succop. In the second quarter, the Lions' Tony Scheffler caught a 36-yard pass for a touchdown. They added to their lead with two field goals from Jason Hanson, from 51 and 28 yards respectively. After halftime, the Lions scored four consecutive touchdowns, three of which followed Kansas City turnovers. First, Calvin Johnson scored on a 1-yard catch. Afterward, Jahvid Best scored two consecutive touchdowns in the fourth quarter, first with a 9-yard catch, and later on a 1-yard run. The Lions capped their blowout victory with a 1-yard run by Keiland Williams. The blowout win set the franchise record for largest margin of victory. It was the first time the Lions went 2–0 since 2007. Lions QB Matthew Stafford – who completed 23 of 39 passes, threw for 294 yards and 4 touchdowns – won the FedEx Air NFL Player of the Week for his performance.

=== Week 3: at Minnesota Vikings ===
Week Three: Detroit Lions at Minnesota Vikings – Game summary

Quarter	1	2	3	4	OT	Total
Lions	0	0	10	13	3	26
Vikings	6	14	0	3	0	23

at Mall of America Field, Minneapolis, Minnesota

- Date: September 25
- Game time: 1:00 PM EDT
- Game weather: Played indoors (domed stadium)
- Game attendance: 62,466
- Referee: Ron Winter
- TV announcers (Fox): Dick Stockton, John Lynch and Jamie Maggio
- Recap
  Gamebook

Game information

First quarter

- MIN – Ryan Longwell 33-yard field goal, Vikings 3–0, Drive: 12 plays, 63 yards, 5:22.
- MIN – Ryan Longwell 41-yard field goal, Vikings 6–0, Drive: 8 plays, 30 yards, 2:36.

Second quarter

- MIN – Adrian Peterson 6-yard run (Ryan Longwell kick), Vikings 13–0, Drive: 6 plays, 67 yards, 3:04.
- MIN – Visanthe Shiancoe 8-yard pass from Donovan McNabb (Ryan Longwell kick), Vikings 20–0, Drive: 3 plays, 13 yards, 0:41.

Third quarter

- DET – Calvin Johnson 32-yard pass from Matthew Stafford (Jason Hanson kick), Vikings 20–7, Drive: 4 plays, 52 yards, 1:39.
- DET – Jason Hanson 28-yard field goal, Vikings 20–10, Drive: 9 plays, 41 yards, 4:58.

Fourth quarter

- DET – Calvin Johnson 5-yard pass from Matthew Stafford (Jason Hanson kick), Vikings 20–17, Drive: 5 plays, 89 yards, 1:53.
- DET – Jason Hanson 50-yard field goal, Tied 20–20, Drive: 12 plays, 51 yards, 6:13.
- DET – Jason Hanson 40-yard field goal, Lions 23–20, Drive: 5 plays, 25 yards, 1:43.
- MIN – Ryan Longwell 49-yard field goal, Tied 23–23, Drive: 9 plays, 52 yards, 1:19.

Overtime

- DET – Jason Hanson 32-yard field goal, Lions 26–23, Drive: 5 plays, 59 yards, 1:59.

Top passers

- DET – Matthew Stafford – 32/46, 378 yards, 2 touchdowns
- MIN – Donovan McNabb – 22/36, 211 yards, 1 touchdown

Top rushers

- DET -Jahvid Best – 12 carries, 16 rushes
- MIN – Adrian Peterson – 17 carries, 78 yards, 1 touchdown

Top receivers

- DET – Brandon Pettigrew – 11 receptions, 112 yards
- MIN – Michael Jenkins – 10 receptions, 99 yards

Top tacklers

- DET – Stephen Tulloch – 7 tackles
- MIN – E. J. Henderson – 7 tackles, 3 assists

In week 3, the Lions traveled west to Minneapolis, Minnesota to face their NFC North Division rivals the Minnesota Vikings. The first half was all Minnesota. In the first quarter, the Vikings' Ryan Longwell made two consecutive field goals, from 33 and 41 yards out respectively. The second quarter featured two consecutive Minnesota touchdowns: first on a 6-yard run by Adrian Peterson, and next on an 8-yard catch by Visanthe Shiancoe. After halftime, the Lions mounted a comeback. In the third quarter, Detroit's Calvin Johnson caught a 32-yard pass for a touchdown. They added more points with a 28-yard field goal by Jason Hanson. In the fourth quarter, Calvin Johnson caught another touchdown pass, this one from 5 yards out. Detroit then tied it up with a 50-yard field goal, and took their first lead of the game, 23–20, after a 40-yard Jason Hanson 3-pointer. Minnesota tied it up again with a 49-yard field goal late in the game, taking it to overtime. Detroit won the coin toss and got the ball first, then scored a 32-yard field goal to win the game. Detroit's 20-point comeback was biggest on the road in team history. It was also the first time the Lions beat the Vikings at the Metrodome since 1997, and the first time the Lions started 3–0 since 1980.

=== Week 4: at Dallas Cowboys ===
Week Four: Detroit Lions at Dallas Cowboys – Game summary

Quarter	1	2	3	4	Total
Lions	0	3	14	17	34
Cowboys	7	13	10	0	30

at Cowboys Stadium, Arlington, Texas

- Date: October 2
- Game time: 1:00 PM EDT
- Game weather: Played indoors (domed stadium)
- Game attendance: 78,122
- Referee: John Parry
- TV announcers (Fox): Joe Buck, Troy Aikman and Pam Oliver
- Recap
  Gamebook

Game information

First quarter

- DAL – Dez Bryant 25-yard pass from Tony Romo (Dan Bailey kick), Cowboys 7–0, Drive: 6 plays, 55 yards, 3:55.

Second quarter

- DAL – Dez Bryant 6-yard pass from Tony Romo (Dan Bailey kick), Cowboys 14–0, Drive: 4 plays, 71 yards, 2:25.
- DAL – Dan Bailey 41-yard field goal, Cowboys 17–0, Drive: 7 plays, 26 yards, 2:48.
- DET – Jason Hanson 33-yard field goal, Cowboys 17–3, Drive: 9 plays, 47 yards, 2:20.
- DAL – Dan Bailey 35-yard field goal, Cowboys 20–3, Drive: 8 plays, 63 yards, 1:28.

Third quarter

- DAL – Jason Witten 1-yard pass from Tony Romo (Dan Bailey kick), Cowboys 27–3, Drive: 6 plays, 46 yards, 2:37.
- DET – Bobby Carpenter 35-yard interception return (Jason Hanson kick), Cowboys 27–10, Drive: 1 plays, 35 yards, 0:00.
- DET – Chris Houston 56-yard interception return (Jason Hanson kick), Cowboys 27–17, Drive: 7 plays, 31 yards, 4:38.
- DAL – Dan Bailey 23-yard field goal, Cowboys 30–17, Drive: 9 plays, 75 yards, 4:57.

Fourth quarter

- DET – Calvin Johnson 23-yard pass from Matthew Stafford (Jason Hanson kick), Cowboys 30–24, Drive: 5 plays, 80 yards, 2:00.
- DET – Jason Hanson 51-yard field goal, Cowboys 30–27, Drive: 8 plays, 14 yards, 3:09.
- DET – Calvin Johnson 2-yard pass from Matthew Stafford (Jason Hanson kick), Lions 34–30, Drive: 7 plays, 40 yards, 2:34.

Top passers

- DET – Matthew Stafford – 21/43, 240 yards, 2 touchdowns, 1 interception
- DAL – Tony Romo – 34/47, 331 yards, 3 touchdowns, 3 interceptions

Top rushers

- DET – Jahvid Best – 11 carries, 47 yards
- DAL – Felix Jones – 16 carries, 57 yards

Top receivers

- DET – Calvin Johnson – 8 receptions, 96 yards, 2 touchdowns
- DAL – Laurent Robinson – 7 receptions, 116 yards

Top tacklers

- DET – Stephen Tulloch – 10 tackles, 2 assists, 1 interception
- DAL – Barry Church – 4 tackles, 1 assist

In week 4, the Lions traveled south to Arlington, Texas to take on the Dallas Cowboys. The Cowboys dominated the first half, putting the Lions in a big hole for the second straight week. First came a 25-yard touchdown catch by Dez Bryant. In the second quarter, Bryant scored again on a 6-yard touchdown catch. Dallas added more points with a 41-yard field goal by Dan Bailey. The Lions then got their only points of the first half with a 33-yard field goal by Jason Hanson. The Cowboys responded with a 35-yard field goal just before halftime. After the break, Dallas added more points with a 1-yard touchdown pass to Jason Witten, putting them up 27–3. The Lions responded with two consecutive defensive touchdowns: first a 34-yard interception return by Bobby Carpenter, then a 56-yard pick-6 by Chris Houston. The Cowboys scored their final points of the game with a 23-yard field goal late in the third quarter. In the fourth quarter, the Lions continued their comeback with a 23-yard touchdown catch by Calvin Johnson. They made it a three-point game with a 51-yard field goal by Jason Hanson, then Romo threw an interception to Stephen Tulloch, and took their first lead of the game late in the final quarter when Calvin Johnson caught his second touchdown of the game from 2 yards out to become only the second player in NFL history to record at least two touchdown catches in 4 straight games (the other to do so is former Vikings receiver Cris Carter). The Lions defense held off Dallas for the win. Like the previous week, the Lions came back and won it in the final moments of the game after being down by a large margin at halftime. This was also the largest comeback the Dallas Cowboys have ever allowed, and it was the largest comeback by a road team in NFL history until the Cleveland Browns topped it with their 25-point road comeback against the Tennessee Titans in 2014. It was the first time the Lions started 4–0 since 1980. This also was its franchise-record fifth straight road win. Ironically, their last game at Dallas saw the Lions lose their franchise-record 26th straight road game.

=== Week 5: vs. Chicago Bears ===
Week Five: Chicago Bears at Detroit Lions – Game summary

Quarter	1	2	3	4	Total
Bears	0	10	0	3	13
Lions	0	7	14	3	24

at Ford Field, Detroit, Michigan

- Date: October 10
- Game time: 8:30 PM EDT
- Game weather: Played indoors (domed stadium)
- Game attendance: 67,861
- Referee: Clete Blakeman
- TV announcers (ESPN): Mike Tirico, Ron Jaworski, Jon Gruden and Suzy Kolber
- Recap
  Gamebook

Game information

First quarter

- No scoring plays

Second quarter

- DET – Calvin Johnson 73-yard pass from Matthew Stafford (Jason Hanson kick), Lions 7–0, Drive: 3 plays, 75 yards, 0:55.
- CHI – Robbie Gould 44-yard field goal, Lions 7–3, Drive: 10 plays, 57 yards, 5:53.
- CHI – Kellen Davis 9-yard pass from Jay Cutler (Robbie Gould kick), Bears 10–7, Drive: 8 plays, 88 yards, 4:50.

Third quarter

- DET – Brandon Pettigrew 18-yard pass from Matthew Stafford (Jason Hanson kick), Lions 14–10, Drive: 7 plays, 67 yards, 2:54.
- DET – Jahvid Best 88-yard run (Jason Hanson kick), Lions 21–10, Drive: 1 play, 88 yards, 0:12.

Fourth quarter

- CHI – Robbie Gould 49-yard field goal, Lions 21–13, Drive: 10 plays, 52 yards, 5:03.
- DET – Jason Hanson 31-yard field goal, Lions 24–13, Drive: 8 plays, 67 yards, 2:11.

Top passers

- CHI – Jay Cutler – 28/38, 249 yards, 1 touchdown
- DET – Matthew Stafford – 19/26, 219 yards, 2 touchdowns, 1 interception

Top rushers

- CHI – Matt Forte – 22 carries, 116 yards
- DET – Jahvid Best – 12 carries, 163 yards, 1 touchdown

Top receivers

- CHI – Dane Sanzenbacher – 6 receptions, 64 yards
- DET – Calvin Johnson – 5 receptions, 130 yards, 1 touchdown

Top tacklers

- CHI – Lance Briggs – 5 tackles, 4 assists
- DET – DeAndre Levy – 9 tackles, 4 assists

In week 5, the Lions hosted a nationally televised primetime NFC North Division duel against the Chicago Bears. It was the first ever Monday Night Football game at Ford Field, the first MNF appearance for the Lions since 2001, and the first Monday night game in the city of Detroit since 1974. Neither team scored in the first quarter. In the second quarter, the Lions got an early lead with a 73-yard catch and run by Calvin Johnson. With this, Johnson became the first receiver in NFL history to record 9 touchdown catches in a season's first five games. The Bears got on the board with a 44-yard field goal by Robbie Gould, and took the lead with a 9-yard catch by Kellen Davis. After halftime, the Lions regained the lead and never gave it back. First came an 18-yard TD catch by Brandon Pettigrew. A few minutes later, Detroit's Jahvid Best ran in a TD from 88 yards out, the second longest touchdown run in franchise history. Each team scored a field goal in the fourth quarter: first one by Chicago from 49 yards out, then a 31-yarder by Jason Hanson that completed the scoring. With the win, the Lions also started 5–0 for the first time since 1956 and also snapped their 6-game losing streak against the Bears. Ford Field's record crowd of nearly 68,000 fans caused 9 false start penalties by the Bears.

=== Week 6: vs. San Francisco 49ers ===
Week Six: San Francisco 49ers at Detroit Lions – Game summary

Quarter	1	2	3	4	Total
49ers	0	12	3	10	25
Lions	10	0	3	6	19

at Ford Field, Detroit, Michigan

- Date: October 16
- Game time: 1:00 PM EDT
- Game weather: Played indoors (domed stadium)
- Game attendance: 62,061
- Referee: Mike Carey
- TV announcers (Fox): Kenny Albert, Daryl Johnston, Tony Siragusa
- Recap
  Gamebook

Game information

First quarter

- DET – Jason Hanson 25-yard field goal, Lions 3–0, Drive: 5 plays, 25 yards, 2:01.
- DET – Brandon Pettigrew 16-yard pass from Matthew Stafford (Jason Hanson kick), Lions 10–0, Drive: 7 plays, 69 yards, 3:02.

Second quarter

- SF – Frank Gore 1-yard run (David Akers kick), Lions 10–7, Drive: 8 plays, 80 yards, 4:47.
- SF – Matthew Stafford sacked by Aldon Smith and Ray McDonald in end zone for −11 yards, Lions 10–9, Drive: 2 plays, −11 yards, 0:05.
- SF – David Akers 55-yard field goal, 49ers 12–10, Drive: 4 plays, 21 yards, 0:55.

Third quarter

- DET – Jason Hanson 24-yard field goal, Lions 13–12, Drive: 7 plays, 54 yards, 2:12.
- SF – David Akers 31-yard field goal, 49ers 15–13, Drive: 6 plays, 67 yards, 2:18.

Fourth quarter

- DET – Nate Burleson 5-yard pass from Matthew Stafford, Lions 19–15, Drive: 8 plays, 49 yards, 2:55.
- SF – Delanie Walker 6-yard pass from Alex Smith (David Akers kick), 49ers 22–19, Drive: 8 plays, 35 yards, 3:33.
- SF – David Akers 37-yard field goal, 49ers 25–19, Drive: 4 plays, 6 yards, 0:14.

Top passers

- SF – Alex Smith – 17/32, 125 yards, 1 touchdown, 1 interception
- DET – Matthew Stafford – 28/50, 293 yards, 2 touchdowns

Top rushers

- SF – Frank Gore – 15 carries, 141 yards, 1 touchdown
- DET – Jahvid Best – 12 carries, 37 yards

Top receivers

- SF – Michael Crabtree – 9 receptions, 77 yards
- DET – Calvin Johnson – 7 receptions, 113 yards

Top tacklers

- SF – NaVorro Bowman – 8 tackles, 5 assists
- DET – DeAndre Levy – 7 tackles, 5 assists

In week 6, the Lions hosted the NFC West Division-leading San Francisco 49ers. The Lions struck first, when Jason Hanson kicked a 25-yard field goal that came after a San Francisco turnover. Detroit added to their lead when Brandon Pettigrew caught a 16-yard TD pass. In the second quarter, the 49ers finally got on the board with a 1-yard TD run by Frank Gore. San Francisco received a safety when Aldon Smith sacked Matthew Stafford in the end zone. The final points of the first half came just before intermission when David Akers of the 49ers kicked a 55-yard field goal, putting the Lions down at halftime for the fourth consecutive week. After the break, Detroit scored on a 24-yard field goal. San Francisco responded with a field goal of their own, this one from 31 yards out. In the fourth quarter, the Lions' Nate Burleson caught a 5-yard TD pass; the Lions went for a 2-point conversion but Calvin Johnson failed to catch Matthew Stafford's pass. In the final 2 minutes, the 49ers rallied from behind, first with a 6-yard TD catch by Delanie Walker, then a 37-yard field goal by David Akers, putting them up 25–19. With 1:02 left in the game, the Lions attempted another comeback, but San Francisco's defense held them off, handing Detroit its first loss of the season as the team fell to 5–1 and 2nd place in the NFC North. After the game, coaches Jim Schwartz and Jim Harbaugh got into an argument after Schwartz claimed Harbaugh pushed him out of the way when the two coaches were shaking hands.

=== Week 7: vs. Atlanta Falcons ===
Week Seven: Atlanta Falcons at Detroit Lions – Game summary

Quarter	1	2	3	4	Total
Falcons	10	7	3	3	23
Lions	3	3	10	0	16

at Ford Field, Detroit, Michigan

- Date: October 23
- Game time: 1:00 PM EDT
- Game weather: Played indoors (domed stadium)
- Game attendance: 63,625
- Referee: Bill Leavy
- TV announcers (Fox): Sam Rosen, Brian Billick and Laura Okmin
- Recap
  Gamebook

Game information

First quarter

- DET – Jason Hanson 43-yard field goal, Lions 3–0, Drive: 4 plays, −10 yards, 1:47.
- ATL – Matt Bryant 23-yard field goal, Tied 3–3, Drive: 7 plays, 21 yards, 3:03.
- ATL – Matt Ryan 1-yard run (Matt Bryant kick), Falcons 10–3, 5 plays, 28 yards, 2:46.

Second quarter

- DET – Jason Hanson 38-yard field goal, Falcons 10–6, Drive: 9 plays, 50 yards, 4:12.
- ATL – Roddy White 18-yard pass from Matt Ryan (Matt Bryant kick), Falcons 17–6, Drive: 7 plays, 81 yards, 3:05

Third quarter

- DET – Jason Hanson 29-yard field goal, Falcons 17–9, Drive: 6 plays, 35 yards, 2:25.
- ATL – Matt Bryant 47 yard, Falcons 20–9, Drive: 7 plays, 51 yards, 2;33.
- DET – Calvin Johnson 57-yard pass from Matthew Stafford (Jason Hanson kick), Falcons 20–16, Drive: 6 plays, 84 yards, 3:07.

Fourth quarter

- ATL – Matt Bryant 40-yard field goal, Falcons 23–16, Drive: 9 plays, 25 yards, 4:42.

Top passers

- ATL – Matt Ryan – 20/34, 218 yards, 1 touchdown, 2 interceptions
- DET – Matthew Stafford – 15/32, 183 yards, 1 touchdown

Top rushers

- ATL – Michael Turner – 27 carries, 122 yards
- DET – Maurice Morris – 9 carries, 50 yards

Top receivers

- ATL – Tony Gonzalez – 5 receptions, 62 yards
- DET – Calvin Johnson – 5 receptions, 115 yards 1 touchdown

Top tacklers

- ATL – Curtis Lofton – 5 tackles, 5 assists
- DET – DeAndre Levy – 6 tackles, 5 assists

In week 7, the Lions hosted the Atlanta Falcons. The Lions took an early lead with a 43-yard field goal by Jason Hanson that came after a Falcons turnover. The Falcons tied it up with a field goal of their own, this one a 23-yarder by Matt Bryant. Atlanta took the lead with a 1-yard quarterback sneak by Matt Ryan. In the second quarter, Jason Hanson kicked another field goal, this time from 38 yards out. Atlanta scored the final points of the first half when Roddy White caught an 18-yard touchdown pass. After halftime, Jason Hanson kicked his third field goal, this one from 29 yards. Atlanta responded with a 47-yard field goal. Late in the third quarter, Detroit scored their only touchdown of the game, with a 57-yard catch and run by Calvin Johnson. The only points of the fourth quarter came a 40-yard Falcons field goal.

=== Week 8: at Denver Broncos ===
Week Eight: Detroit Lions at Denver Broncos – Game summary

Quarter	1	2	3	4	Total
Lions	7	17	14	7	45
Broncos	3	0	0	7	10

at Sports Authority Field at Mile High, Denver, Colorado

- Date: October 30
- Game time: 4:05 PM EDT
- Game weather: 56 °F (13 °C) (Sunny)
- Game attendance: 74,977
- Referee: Walt Coleman
- TV announcers (Fox): Dick Stockton, John Lynch and Jaime Maggio
- Recap
  Gamebook

Game information

First quarter

- DEN – Matt Prater 39-yard field goal, Broncos 3–0, Drive: 8 plays, 59 yards, 3:40.
- DET – Titus Young 41-yard pass from Matthew Stafford (Jason Hanson kick), Lions 7–3, Drive: 6 plays, 80 yards, 2:40.

Second quarter

- DET – Jason Hanson 50-yard field goal, Lions 10–3, Drive info: 7 plays, 57 yards, 2:34.
- DET – Tony Scheffler 1-yard pass from Matthew Stafford, (Jason Hanson kick), Lions 17–3, Drive: 8 plays, 68 yards, 4:39.
- DET – Maurice Morris 1-yard run (Jason Hanson kick), Lions 24–3, Drive: 7 plays, 49 yards, 1:36.

Third quarter

- DET – Cliff Avril 24-yard fumble return (Jason Hanson kick), Lions 31–3, Drive: 1 plays, 26 yards, 0:29.
- DET – Calvin Johnson 56-yard pass from Matthew Stafford (Jason Hanson kick), Lions 38–3, Drive info: 2 plays, 67 yards, 0:48.

Fourth quarter

- DET – Chris Houston 100-yard Interception Return (Jason Hanson kick), Lions 45–3, Drive info: 11 plays, 70 yards, 4:26.
- DEN – Eric Decker 14-yard pass from Tim Tebow (Matt Prater kick), Lions 45–10, Drive info: 9 plays, 80 yards, 3:45.

Top passers

- DET – Matthew Stafford – 21/30, 267 yards, 3 touchdowns
- DEN – Tim Tebow – 18/39, 172 yards, 1 touchdown, 1 interception

Top rushers

- DET – Maurice Morris – 13 carries, 15 yards, 1 touchdown
- DEN – Knowshon Moreno – 14 carries, 69 yards

Top receivers

- DET – Calvin Johnson – 6 receptions, 125 yards, 1 touchdown
- DEN – Eric Decker – 6 receptions 72 yards, 1 touchdown

Top tacklers

- DET – Stephen Tulloch – 6 tackles, 2 assists, 1 sack
- DEN – Chris Harris – 6 tackles, 3 assists

In week 8, the Lions traveled west to Denver, Colorado for an interconference duel with the Denver Broncos. The Broncos scored their only points of the first half on their opening drive, getting a 39-yard field goal from Matt Prater. With a 41-yard touchdown catch by Titus Young, the Lions took the lead and never gave it back. In the second quarter, Jason Hanson kicked a 50-yard field goal. Next, Tony Scheffler caught a 1-yard touchdown pass. Just before halftime, Maurice Morris ran in a touchdown from 1-yard out, putting the Lions up 24–3. After the intermission, the Lions continued their domination with three more unanswered touchdowns. First, Cliff Avril picked up a Tim Tebow fumble and returned it 24 yards for 6 points. Calvin Johnson then scored a touchdown on a 56-yard catch and run. Chris Houston then intercepted a Tim Tebow pass in the end zone and ran the entire length of the field for a score to cap the Lions victory. The Broncos then scored their only points of the second half on a 14-yard touchdown catch by Eric Decker. The Lions defense sacked Tim Tebow seven times. Lions defensive end Cliff Avril, who recorded two sack fumbles and touchdown, was named the NFC Defensive Player of the Week for his performance. The Lions' 45 points was the most scored on the road since 1967. With the win, the Lions went into their bye week with a 6–2 record. Detroit also extended its road winning streak (dating back to 2010) to six straight games.

=== Week 10: at Chicago Bears ===
Week Ten: Detroit Lions at Chicago Bears – Game summary

Quarter	1	2	3	4	Total
Lions	0	6	0	7	13
Bears	10	10	17	0	37

at Soldier Field, Chicago, Illinois

- Date: November 13
- Game time: 4:15 PM EST
- Game weather: 69 °F (21 °C) (Cloudy)
- Game attendance: 62,396
- Referee: Pete Morelli
- TV announcers (Fox): Thom Brennaman, Brian Billick and Laura Okmin
- Recap
  Gamebook

Game information

First quarter

- CHI – Matt Forte 6-yard run (Robbie Gould kick), Bears 7–0,, Drive: 4 plays, 30 yards, 1:41.
- CHI – Robbie Gould 43-yard field goal, Bears 10–0, Drive: 8 plays, 37 yards, 3:36.

Second quarter

- CHI – Robbie Gould 35-yard field goal, Bears 13–0, Drive: 8 plays, 35 yards, 2:44.
- CHI – Devin Hester 82-yard punt return (Robbie Gould kick), Bears 20–0, Drive: 1 play, 82 yards, 0:00.
- DET – Jason Hanson 29-yard field goal, Bears 20–3, Drive: 4 plays, 9 yards, 0:49.
- DET – Jason Hanson 35-yard field goal, Bears 20–6, Drive: 14 plays, 48 yards, 5:25.

Third quarter

- CHI – Major Wright 24-yard interception return (Robbie Gould kick), Bears 27–6, Drive: 1 play 24 yards, 0:00.
- CHI – Charles Tillman 44-yard interception return (Robbie Gould kick), Bears 34–6, Drive: 1 play, 44 yards, 0:00.
- CHI – Robbie Gould 50-yard field goal, Bears 37–6, Drive: 6 plays, 47 yards, 2;33.

Fourth quarter

- DET – Tony Scheffler 10-yard pass from Matthew Stafford (Jason Hanson kick), Bears 37–13, Drive: 8 plays, 56 yards, 2:00.

Top passers

- DET – Matthew Stafford – 33/63, 323 yards, 1 touchdown, 4 interceptions
- CHI – Jay Cutler – 9/19, 123 yards

Top rushers

- DET – Maurice Morris – 10 carries, 44 yards
- CHI – Matt Forte – 18 carries, 64 yards, 1 touchdown

Top receivers

- DET – Nate Burleson – 8 receptions, 83 yards
- CHI – Earl Bennett – 6 receptions, 81 yards

Top tacklers

- DET – Stephen Tulloch – 7 tackles
- CHI – Tim Jennings – 9 tackles, 1 assist

After their bye week, the Lions traveled to Chicago, Illinois for a rematch with their division foes the Chicago Bears. Chicago started the scoring with a 6-yard touchdown rush by Matt Forte. The Bears added to their lead with a 43-yard field goal by Robbie Gould. In the second quarter, Chicago added more points with a 35-yard field goal, and made it a 20–0 game when Devin Hester returned a punt 82 yards for a touchdown. Detroit finally got on the board with two consecutive field goals by Jason Hanson, from 29 and 35 yards out respectively. After halftime, the Bears defense intercepted Lions QB Matthew Stafford twice for touchdowns. First, Major Wright caught one and ran it in 24 yards. Then Charles Tillman completed a 44-yard pick 6. The Bears added to their large lead with a 50-yard field goal. The Lions scored their only points of the second half with a 10-yard touchdown catch by Tony Scheffler. This was the Lions' first road loss of the season. The game was marred by an on-field fight between players midway through the 4th quarter.

=== Week 11: vs. Carolina Panthers ===
Week Eleven: Carolina Panthers at Detroit Lions – Game summary

Quarter	1	2	3	4	Total
Panthers	10	17	0	8	35
Lions	0	14	14	21	49

at Ford Field, Detroit, Michigan

- Date: November 20
- Game time: 1:00 PM EST
- Game weather: Played indoors (domed stadium)
- Game attendance: 63,633
- Referee: Gene Steratore
- TV announcers (Fox): Dick Stockton, John Lynch and Jennifer Hale
- Recap
  Gamebook

Game information

First quarter

- CAR – Olindo Mare 27-yard field goal, Panthers 3–0, Drive: 9 plays, 73 yards, 4:40.
- CAR – Steve Smith 15-yard pass from Cam Newton (Olindo Mare kick), Panthers 10–0, Drive: 5 plays, 29 yards, 1:54.

Second quarter

- DET – Kevin Smith 28-yard pass from Matthew Stafford (Jason Hanson kick), Panthers 10–7, Drive: 3 plays, 80 yards, 1:31.
- CAR – Kealoha Pilares 101-yard kickoff return (Olindo Mare kick), Panthers 17–7, Drive info: 1 plays, 102 yards, 0:00.
- CAR – Cam Newton 11-yard run (Olindo Mare kick), Panthers 24–7, Drive: 5 plays, 48 yards, 1:53.
- DET – Titus Young 3-yard pass from Matthew Stafford (Jason Hanson kick), Panthers 24–14, Drive: 12 plays, 80 yards, 6:35.
- CAR – Olindo Mare 31-yard field goal, Panthers 27–14, Drive: 13 plays, 72 yards, 2:57.

Third quarter

- DET – Nate Burleson 16-yard pass from Matthew Stafford (Jason Hanson kick), Panthers 27–21, Drive: 3 plays, 30 yards, 1:23.
- DET – Tony Scheffler 17-yard pass from Matthew Stafford (Jason Hanson kick), Lions 28–27, Drive: 6 plays, 66 yards, 3:18.

Fourth quarter

- DET – Kevin Smith 4-yard run (Jason Hanson kick), Lions 35–27, Drive: 8 plays, 69 yards, 4:34.
- CAR – Cam Newton 6-yard run (Cam Newton pass to Steve Smith for two-point conversion), Tied 35–35, Drive: 6 plays, 80 yards, 3:03.
- DET – Brandon Pettigrew 7-yard pass from Matthew Stafford (Jason Hanson kick), Lions 42–35, Drive: 7 plays, 80 yards, 2:27.
- DET – Kevin Smith 19-yard run (Jason Hanson kick), Lions 49–35, Drive: 3 plays, 23 yards, 0:17.

Top passers

- CAR – Cam Newton – 22/38, 280 yard, 1 touchdown, 4 interceptions
- DET – Matthew Stafford – 28/36, 335 yards, 5 touchdowns, 2 interceptions

Top rushers

- CAR – DeAngelo Williams – 10 carries, 73 yards
- DET – Kevin Smith – 16 carries, 140 yards, 2 touchdowns

Top receivers

- CAR – Jonathan Stewart – 6 receptions, 87 yards
- DET – Calvin Johnson – 5 receptions, 89 yards

Top tacklers

- CAR – James Anderson – 7 tackles, 3 assists
- DET – DeAndre Levy – 5 tackles, 3 assists

In week 11, the Lions hosted the Carolina Panthers. The Panthers took an early lead in the first quarter when Olindo Mare kicked a 27-yard field goal, and made it 10–0 when Steve Smith caught a 15-yard touchdown pass. The Lions answered in the second quarter when Kevin Smith ran in a touchdown from 28 yards out. Carolina responded with 2 touchdowns. First, Kealoha Pilares returned a kickoff the entire length of the field for 7 points, then a few minutes later, QB Cam Newton ran it in himself for another 7. At this point, the Lions were down by 17 points with the score 24–7. The Lions' Titus Young then caught a 3-yard pass for a TD. The Panthers kicked a 31-yard field goal just before halftime, putting the Lions down by 13 points. After the break, the Lions mounted yet another second half comeback with 3 consecutive touchdowns. First, Nate Burleson caught a 6-yard pass, then Tony Scheffler caught a 17-yard pass, giving the Lions their first lead of the game. Then in the 4th quarter, Kevin Smith scored his second touchdown of the game, this one on a 4-yard rush. The Panthers scored their only points of the second half when Cam Newton recorded his second rushing touchdown; Carolina's Cam Newton then completed a 2-point conversion to Steve Smith to tie the game. A few minutes later, Detroit retook the lead when Brandon Pettigrew caught a 7-yard pass for a TD. The Lions capped their victory with Kevin Smith's third touchdown of the game, this one on a 19-yard rush. By winning this game after trailing by 17 points, the Lions are the first team in NFL history that have won 3 games in one season in which they trailed by at least 17 points.

=== Week 12: vs. Green Bay Packers (Thanksgiving Day game) ===
Week Twelve: Green Bay Packers at Detroit Lions – Game summary

Quarter	1	2	3	4	Total
Packers	0	7	17	3	27
Lions	0	0	0	15	15

at Ford Field, Detroit, Michigan

- Date: November 24
- Game time: 12:30 PM EST
- Game weather: Played indoors (domed stadium)
- Game attendance: 66,263
- Referee: Terry McAulay
- TV announcers (Fox): Joe Buck, Troy Aikman and Pam Oliver
- Recap
  Gamebook

Game information

First quarter

- No scoring plays

Second quarter

- GB – Greg Jennings 3-yard pass from Aaron Rodgers (Mason Crosby kick), Packers 7–0, Drive: 2 plays, 13 yards, 0:42.

Third quarter

- GB – John Kuhn 1-yard run (Mason Crosby kick), Packers 14–0, Drive: 11 plays, 77 yards, 5:54.
- GB – James Jones 65-yard pass from Aaron Rodgers (Mason Crosby kick), Packers 21–0, Drive: 1 play, 65 yards, 0:11.
- GB – Mason Crosby 35-yard field goal, Packers 24–0, Drive: 6 plays, 16 yards, 3:41.

Fourth quarter

- DET – Keiland Williams 16-yard run (Two-Point Conversion Pass from Matthew Stafford to Titus Young), Packers 24–8, Drive: 7 plays, 72 yards, 2:59.
- GB – Mason Crosby 32-yard field goal, Packers 27–8, Drive: 10 plays, 53 yards, 5:42.
- DET – Calvin Johnson 3-yard pass from Matthew Stafford (Jason Hanson kick), Packers 27–15, Drive: 11 plays, 79 yards, 2:32.

Top passers

- GB – Aaron Rodgers – 22/33, 307 yards, 2 touchdowns
- DET – Matthew Stafford – 32/45, 276 yards, 1 touchdown, 3 interceptions

Top rushers

- GB – Ryan Grant – 6 carries, 20 yards
- DET – maurice Morris – 7 carries, 39 yards

Top receivers

- GB – James Jones – 3 receptions, 94 yards, 1 touchdown
- DET – Maurce Morris – 9 receptions, 81 yards

Top tacklers

- GB – Erik Walden – 5 tackles, 3 assists
- DET – Amari Spievey – 6 tackles, 1 assist

For their annual Thanksgiving Day game, the Lions hosted their NFC North Division rivals, the then-undefeated Green Bay Packers. After a scoreless first quarter, Detroit trailed in the second quarter after Packers quarterback Aaron Rodgers completed a 3-yard touchdown pass to wide receiver Greg Jennings. After halftime, Green Bay added to their lead in the third quarter when fullback John Kuhn scored with a 1-yard touchdown run, followed by a 65-yard touchdown catch to wide receiver James Jones. Later, Mason Crosby scored with a 35-yard field goal. Detroit finally get on the board in the fourth quarter with a 16-yard touchdown run from running back Keiland Williams (with a successful two-point conversion pass from quarterback Matthew Stafford to wide receiver Titus Young), but the Packers pulled away when Crosby booted a 32-yard field goal. The Lions closed out the game when Stafford hooked up with wide receiver Calvin Johnson on a 3-yard touchdown pass late in the final quarter.

=== Week 13: at New Orleans Saints ===
Week Thirteen: Detroit Lions at New Orleans Saints – Game summary

Quarter	1	2	3	4	Total
Lions	0	7	10	0	17
Saints	3	21	0	7	31

at Mercedes-Benz Superdome, New Orleans, Louisiana

- Date: December 4
- Game time: 8:20 pm EST
- Game weather: Played indoors (domed stadium)
- Game attendance: 73,042
- Referee: Clete Blakeman
- TV announcers (NBC): Al Michaels, Cris Collinsworth and Michele Tafoya
- Recap
  Gamebook

Game information

First quarter

- NO – John Kasay 39-yard field goal, Saints 3–0, Drive: 13 plays, 37 yards, 5:08.

Second quarter

- NO – Mark Ingram II 14-yard run (John Kasay kick), Saints 10–0, Drive: 9 plays, 93 yards, 4:08.
- NO – Robert Meachem 67-yard pass from Drew Brees (John Kasay kick), Saints 17–0, Drive: 2 plays, 75 yards, 0:17.
- DET – Kevin Smith 2-yard run (Jason Hanson kick), Saints 17–7, Drive: 10 plays, 80 yards, 5:35.
- NO – Lance Moore 20-yard pass from Drew Brees (John Kasay kick), Saints 24–7, Drive: 8 plays, 51 yards, 1:53.

Third quarter

- DET – Jason Hanson 31-yard field goal, Saints 24–10, Drive: 11 plays, 86 yards, 5:27.
- DET – Maurice Morris 9-yard pass from Matthew Stafford (Jason Hanson kick), Saints 24–17, Drive: 9 plays, 92 yards, 5:30.

Fourth quarter

- NO – Darren Sproles 6-yard pass from Drew Brees (John Kasay kick), Saints 31–17, Drive: 7 plays, 55 yards, 2:49.

Top passers

- DET – Matthew Stafford – 31/44, 408 yards, 1 touchdown, 1 interception
- NO – Drew Brees −26/36, 342 yards, 3 touchdowns

Top rushers

- DET – Kevin Smith – 6 carries, 34 yards, 1 touchdown
- NO – Mark Ingram II – 16 carries, 34 yards, 1 touchdown

Top receivers

- DET – Nate Burleson – 5 receptions, 93 yards
- NO – Robert Meachem – 3 receptions, 119 yards, 1 touchdown

Top tacklers

- DET – Amari Speivey – 9 tackles, 1 assist
- NO – Jonathan Vilma – 6 tackles, 1 assist

In week 13, the Lions traveled south for a nationally televised prime-time contest with the New Orleans Saints. The Saints scored the only points of the first quarter when John Kasay kicked a 39-yard field goal. New Orleans added to their lead in the second quarter with 2 consecutive touchdowns: first with a 14-yard run by Mark Ingram II, then a 67-yard catch and run by Robert Meachem. Detroit scored their only points of the first half when Kevin Smith ran in a touchdown from 2 yards out. The Saints responded when Drew Brees threw a 20-yard touchdown pass to Lance Moore. After halftime, the Lions attempted a comeback when Jason Hanson kicked a 31-yard field goal, and later Maurice Morris caught a 9-yard touchdown pass from Matthew Stafford. However, the Saints pulled away in the final quarter when Darren Sproles caught a 6-yard pass for a touchdown.

=== Week 14: vs. Minnesota Vikings ===
Week Fourteen: Minnesota Vikings at Detroit Lions – Game summary

Quarter	1	2	3	4	Total
Vikings	7	7	7	7	28
Lions	21	10	0	3	34

at Ford Field, Detroit, Michigan

- Date: December 11
- Game time: 1:00 pm EST
- Game weather: Played indoors (domed stadium)
- Game attendance: 63,988
- Referee: John Parry
- TV announcers (Fox): Thom Brennaman, Brian Billick and Laura Okmin
- Recap
  Gamebook

Game information

First quarter

- DET – Stephen Tulloch recovered fumble in end zone (Jason Hanson kick), Lions 7–0, Drive: 1 plays, 0 yards, 0:00.
- DET – Titus Young 57-yard pass from Matthew Stafford (Jason Hanson kick), Lions 14–0, Drive: 3 plays, 53 yards, 1:43.
- DET – Brandon Pettigrew 12-yard pass from Matthew Stafford (Jason Hanson kick), Lions 21–0, Drive: 4 plays, 34 yards, 1:52.
- MIN – Visanthe Shiancoe 7-yard pass from Christian Ponder (Ryan Longwell kick), Lions 21–7, Drive: 10 plays, 80 yards, 4:03.

Second quarter

- DET – Alphonso Smith 30-yard interception return (Jason Hanson kick), Lions 28–7, Drive: 1 play, 31 yards, 0:00.
- MIN – Percy Harvin 6 Yd Pass From Christian Ponder (Ryan Longwell kick), Lions 28–14, Drive: 10 plays, 60 yards, 4:57.
- DET – Jason Hanson 30-yard field goal, Lions 31–14, Drive: 4 plays, 4 yards, 1:15.

Third quarter

- MIN – Joe Webb 65-yard run (Ryan Longwell kick), Lions 31–21, Drive: 9 plays, 88 yards, 3:41.

Fourth quarter

- DET – Jason Hanson 26-yard field goal, Lions 34–21, Drive: 15 plays, 83 yards, 7:04.
- MIN – Toby Gerhart 2-yard pass from Joe Webb (Ryan Longwell Kick), Lions 34–28, Drive: 12 plays, 60 yards, 4:23.

Top passers

- MIN – Christian Ponder – 11/21, 115 yards, 2 touchdowns, 3 interceptions
- DET – Matthew Stafford – 20/29, 227 yards, 2 touchdowns

Top rushers

- MIN – Joe Webb – 7 carries, 109 yards, 1 touchdown
- DET – Keiland Williams – 12 carries, 43 yards

Top receivers

- MIN – Percy Harvin – 10 receptions, 69 yards, 1 touchdown
- DET – Titus Young – 4 receptions, 87 yards, 1 touchdown

Top tacklers

- MIN – Chad Greenway – 5 tackles, 3 assists
- DET – Stephen Tulloch – 6 tackles, 3 assists, 1 touchdown

In week 14, the Lions hosted a rematch with their NFC North rivals the Minnesota Vikings. The Lions took an early lead which they never gave back after Vikings quarterback Christian Ponder fumbled the ball on the Vikings' first offensive play of the game and Stephen Tulloch picked it up in the end zone for a touchdown. The Lions added more points when Titus Young caught a Matthew Stafford pass and ran it in 57 yards for a TD, and added another seven when Brandon Pettigrew caught a 12-yard pass. The Vikings got on the board late in the first quarter when Visanthe Shiancoe caught a seven-yard pass from Ponder. In the second quarter, Detroit's defense scored again when Alphonso Smith intercepted a Ponder pass and ran it back 30 yards for a TD. Minnesota responded when Percy Harvin caught a six-yard touchdown pass. The Lions scored the final points of the first half when Jason Hanson kicked a 30-yard field goal. This was their first 31-point first half since 1985. After halftime, Vikings backup quarterback Joe Webb came into the game and ran in a touchdown himself from 65 yards out. In the fourth quarter, the Lions scored their only points of the second half when Hanson kicked his second field goal of the game, this one from 26 yards out. Minnesota responded with a two-yard TD catch by Toby Gerhart. After a defensive stop, the Vikings attempted a late comeback when they drove down the field in the final minute of the game, but Webb fumbled the ball after being sacked by DeAndre Levy on first and goal with nine seconds left, evading a facemask call, but handing the Lions the victory.

=== Week 15: at Oakland Raiders ===
Week Fifteen: Detroit Lions at Oakland Raiders – Game summary

Quarter	1	2	3	4	Total
Lions	7	7	0	14	28
Raiders	7	10	0	10	27

at O.co Coliseum, Oakland, California

- Date: December 18
- Game time: 4:05 PM EST
- Game weather: 50 °F (10 °C) (Cloudy) SE 1 mph (1.6 km/h)
- Game attendance: 59,069
- Referee: Bill Leavy
- TV announcers (Fox): Thom Brennaman, Brian Billick and Laura Okmin
- Recap
  Gamebook

Game information

First quarter

- OAK – Louis Murphy 12-yard run (Sebastian Janikowski kick), Raiders 7–0, Drive: 4 plays, 76 yards, 1:20.
- DET – Calvin Johnson 51-yard pass from Matthew Stafford (Jason Hanson kick), Tied 7–7, Drive: 7 plays, 80 yards, 2:45.

Second quarter

- OAK – Darrius Heyward-Bey 43-yard pass from Carson Palmer (Sebastian Janikowski kick), Raiders 14–7, Drive: 6 plays, 94 yards, 3:26.
- DET – Nate Burleson 39-yard pass from Matthew Stafford (Jason Hanson kick), Tied 14–14, Drive: 7 plays, 68 yards, 2:27.
- OAK – Sebastian Janikowski 46-yard field goal, Raiders 17–14, Drive: 8 plays, 51 yards, 1:14.

Third quarter

- No scoring plays

Fourth quarter

- OAK – Sebastian Janikowski 51-yard field goal, Raiders 20–14, Drive: 8 plays, 33 yards, 4:00.
- OAK – Aaron Curry 6-yard fumble return (Sebastian Janikowski kick), Raiders 27–14, Drive info: 3 plays, −8 yards, 0:25.
- DET – Titus Young 3-yard pass from Matthew Stafford (Jason Hanson kick), Raiders 27–21, Drive info: 10 plays, 71 yards, 2:48.
- DET – Calvin Johnson 6-yard pass from Matthew Stafford (Jason Hanson kick), Lions 28–27, Drive: 7 plays, 98 yards, 1:35.

Top passers

- DET – Matthew Stafford – 29/52, 391 yards, 4 touchdowns
- OAK – Carson Palmer 32/40, 367 yards, 1 touchdown

Top rushers

- DET – Kevin Smith – 15 carries, 43 yards
- OAK – Michael Bush – 18 carries, 77 yards

Top receivers

- DET – Calvin Johnson – 9 receptions, 214 yards, 2 touchdowns
- OAK – Darrius Heyward-Bey – 8 receptions, 155 yards, 1 touchdown

Top tacklers

- DET – Stephen Tulloch – 8 tackles, 2 assists
- OAK – Rolando McClain – 7 tackles, 2 assists, 1 sack

In week 15, the Lions traveled west for an interconference duel with the Oakland Raiders. The Raiders struck first when Louis Murphy ran in a touchdown from 12 yards out. The Lions responded with a 51-yard touchdown pass from Matthew Stafford to Calvin Johnson. In the second quarter, Oakland re-took the lead when Darrius Heyward-Bey caught a 43-yard pass from Carson Palmer, but the Lions tied it back up when Nate Burlseon caught a 39-yard pass for a TD. Oakland took the lead back just before halftime with a 46-yard field goal by Sebastian Janikowski. After a scoreless third quarter, the Raiders kicked a 51-yard field goal, and added 7 more points when Aaron Curry picked up a Matthew Stafford fumble and ran it in 6 yards for a touchdown, putting them up 27–14 with just under 8 minutes left in the game. The Lions then mounted their 6th comeback of the season from a 13+ point deficit, first with a 3-yard catch by Titus Young, then Calvin Johnson caught his second touchdown of the game from 6 yards out to put them up 28–27 with 39 seconds left to play. The Raiders then drove down the field, and attempted a 65-yard field goal on fourth down, which would have broken Sebastian Janikowski's own NFL-record of 63 yards which he shares with two other placekickers, but it was blocked by Ndamukong Suh, giving the Lions the win and keeping their playoff hopes alive as the team improved to 9–5, securing their first winning season since 2000.

=== Week 16: vs. San Diego Chargers ===
Week Sixteen: San Diego Chargers at Detroit Lions – Game summary

Quarter	1	2	3	4	Total
Chargers	0	0	10	0	10
Lions	10	14	7	7	38

at Ford Field, Detroit, Michigan

- Date: December 24
- Game time: 4:05 PM EST
- Game weather: Played indoors (domed stadium)
- Game attendance: 62,469
- Referee: Ed Hochuli
- TV announcers (CBS): Greg Gumbel and Dan Dierdorf
- Recap
  Gamebook

Game information

First quarter

- DET – Brandon Pettigrew 7-yard pass from Matthew Stafford (Jason Hanson kick), Lions 7–0, Drive: 9 plays, 74 yards, 4:08.
- DET – Jason Hanson 50-yard field goal, Lions 10–0, Drive: 13 plays, 65 yards, 6:30.

Second quarter

- DET – Kevin Smith 3-yard pass from Matthew Stafford (Jason Hanson kick), Lions 17–0, Drive: 11 plays, 87 yards, 5:16.
- DET – Calvin Johnson 14 Yd pass from Matthew Stafford (Jason Hanson kick), Lions 24–0, Drive: 9 plays, 74 yards, 4:22.

Third quarter

- SD – Malcom Floyd 11-yard pass from Philip Rivers (Nick Novak kick), Lions 24–7, Drive: 5 plays, 57 yards, 2:04.
- SD – Nick Novak 22-yard field goal, Lions 24–10, Drive: 10 plays, 43 yards, 3:45
- DET – Kevin Smith 6-yard run (Jason Hanson kick), Lions 31–10, Drive: 9 plays, 80 yards, 4;37.

Fourth quarter

- DET – Cliff Avril 4-yard interception return (Jason Hanson Kick), Lions 38–10, Drive: 1 play, 4 plays, 0:00.

Top passers

- SD – Philip Rivers – 28/53, 299 yards, 1 touchdown, 2 interceptions
- DET – Matthew Stafford – 29/36, 373 yards, 3 touchdowns

Top rushers

- SD – Ryan Matthews – 11 carries, 58 yards
- DET – Kevin Smith – 15 carries, 49 yards, 1 touchdown

Top receivers

- SD – Malcolm Floyd – 6 receptions, 95 yards, 1 touchdown
- DET – Calvin Johnson – 4 receptions, 102 yards, 1 touchdown

Top tacklers

- SD – Steve Gregory – 7 tackles, 1 assist
- DET – Justin Durant – 8 tackles, 3 assists

For their last home game of the regular season, the Lions hosted a rare Saturday evening contest against the San Diego Chargers. The first half was all Detroit. First came a 7-yard touchdown pass from Matthew Stafford to Brandon Pettigrew, followed by a 30-yard field goal by Jason Hanson. In the second quarter, Kevin Smith caught a 3-yard touchdown pass, followed by a Calvin Johnson 14-yard touchdown catch in the final minute of the half, putting the Lions up 24–0 at the break. After the intermission, the Chargers finally got on the board with an 11-yard touchdown pass from Philip Rivers to Malcolm Floyd, followed by a 22-yard field goal by Nick Novak. Detroit responded with a 6-yard touchdown run by Kevin Smith. The only points of the fourth quarter came when Cliff Avril intercepted a pass from Philip Rivers and ran it in 4 yards for a touchdown. With the win, the Lions improved to 10–5 and clinched an NFC Wildcard spot in the playoffs, their first postseason appearance since 1999. Also, the Lions became the only NFC North team to beat all AFC West teams on the season.

=== Week 17: at Green Bay Packers ===
Week Seventeen: Detroit Lions at Green Bay Packers – Game summary

Quarter	1	2	3	4	Total
Lions	9	10	15	7	41
Packers	10	14	7	14	45

at Lambeau Field, Green Bay, Wisconsin

- Date: January 1
- Game time: 1:00 PM EST
- Game weather: 31 °F (−1 °C) (Flurries) NW 20 mph (32 km/h)
- Game attendance: 70,294
- Referee: Walt Coleman
- TV announcers (Fox): Thom Brennaman, Brian Billick, & Laura Okmin
- Recap
  Gamebook

Game information

First quarter

- DET – Titus Young 8-yard pass from Matthew Stafford (Jason Hanson kick), Lions 7–0, Drive: 4 plays, 35 yards, 1:09.
- DET – Pat Lee tackled in end zone by team for safety, Lions 9–0, Drive: 1 play, 0 yards, 0:00.
- GB – Mason Crosby 22-yard field goal, Lions 9–3, Drive: 15 plays, 64 yards, 5:34.
- GB – Jordy Nelson 7-yard pass from Matt Flynn (Mason Crosby kick), Packers 10–9, Drive: 7 plays, 48 yards, 4:01.

Second quarter

- DET – Calvin Johnson 13-yard pass from Matthew Stafford (Jason Hanson kick), Lions 16–10, Drive: 10 plays, 60 yards, 4:11.
- GB – Ryan Grant 80-yard pass from Matt Flynn (Mason Crosby kick), Packers 17–16, Drive: 2 plays, 80 yards, 0:18.
- DET – Jason Hanson 30 Yd field goal, Lions 19–17, Drive: 5 plays, 27 yards, 1:25.
- GB – Jordy Nelson 36-yard pass from Matt Flynn (Mason Crosby kick), Packers 24–19, Drive: 4 plays, 79 yards, 2:16.

Third quarter

- DET – Titus Young 2-yard pass from Matthew Stafford (Jason Hanson kick), Lions 26–24, Drive: 7 plays, 60 yards, 3:32.
- GB – Jordy Nelson 58-yard pass from Matt Flynn (Mason Crosby kick), Packers 31–26, Drive: 4 plays, 80 yards, 2:07.
- DET – Kevin Smith 5-yard pass from Matthew Stafford (Matthew Stafford pass to Tony Scheffler for two-point conversion), Lions 34–31, Drive: 6 plays, 80 yards, 2:25.

Fourth quarter

- GB – Donald Driver 35-yard pass from Matt Flynn (Mason Crosby kick), Packers 38–34, Drive: 7 plays, 69 yards, 4:40.
- DET – Tony Scheffler 12-yard pass from Matthew Stafford (Jason Hanson kick), Lions 41–38, Drive: 6 plays, 93 yards, 2:22.
- GB – Jermichael Finley 4-yard pass from Matt Flynn (Mason Crosby kick), Packers 45–41, Drive: 8 plays, 80 yards, 1:29.

Top passers

- DET – Matthew Stafford – 36/59, 520 yards, 5 TD, 2 INT
- GB – Matt Flynn – 31/44, 480 yards, 6 TD, 1 INT

Top rushers

- DET – Kevin Smith – 9 rushes, 35 yards
- GB – Ryan Grant – 12 rushes, 48 yards

Top receivers

- DET – Calvin Johnson – 11 receptions, 244 yards, 1 TD
- GB – Jordy Nelson – 9 receptions, 162 yards, 3 TD

Top tacklers

- DET – Alphonso Smith – 7 tackles
- GB – Charlie Peprah – 8 tackles

For the last game of the regular season, the Lions, hoping to clinch the #5 seed in the postseason, traveled to Green Bay, Wisconsin for a shootout with their NFC North Division rivals the Green Bay Packers. On game day it was revealed that many of the Packers' starters were inactive, giving them a chance to heal and rest up for the playoffs (the Packers having already clinched a first-round bye and first seed in their division). The Lions took an early lead when Titus Young caught an 8-yard pass from Matthew Stafford for a touchdown, and received a safety when Green Bay's Pat Lee was tackled in the end zone by team. The Packers got on the board when Mason Crosby kicked a 22-yard field goal, and got their first lead of the game when Jordy Nelson caught a 7-yard touchdown pass from backup quarterback Matt Flynn. In the second quarter, the score started to sea-saw, and continued to do so for the remainder of the game. First, the Lions' Calvin Johnson caught a 13-yard touchdown pass. Then Green Bay's Ryan Grant scored on an 80-yard catch and run. Detroit responded with a 30-yard field goal from Jason Hanson. Green Bay scored another touchdown just before halftime when Jordy Nelson caught his second touchdown pass of the game, this time from 36 yards out. After the break, the Lions' Titus Young caught another touchdown pass, this time from 2 yards out. The Packers answered with Jordy Nelson's third scoring catch, this one from 58 yards out. Detroit responded with a 5-yard touchdown catch by Kevin Smith and successfully completed a two-point conversion with a pass to Tony Scheffler. Midway through the final quarter, Green Bay's Donald Driver caught a 35-yard pass for a touchdown. Detroit re-took the lead late when Tony Scheffler caught a 12-yard pass, but the Packers gained it back when Jermichael Finley caught a 4-yard touchdown pass. The Lions then got the ball back to attempt to win the game with under a minute to play, but Stafford threw an interception with 45 seconds left, giving the Packers the victory, and the Lions' 20th consecutive loss in the state of Wisconsin. With the loss, the Lions were declared the #6 seed in the playoffs.

== Postseason results ==
See also 2011–12 NFL Wildcard game#Detroit Lions at New Orleans Saints

=== NFC Wild Card Round: at #3 New Orleans Saints ===
Wildcard Game: Detroit Lions at New Orleans Saints – Game summary

Quarter	1	2	3	4	Total
Lions	7	7	7	7	28
Saints	0	10	14	21	45

at Mercedes-Benz Superdome, New Orleans, Louisiana

- Date: January 7
- Game time: 8:00 PM EST
- Game weather: Played indoors (domed stadium)
- Game attendance: 73,038
- Referee: Tony Corrente
- TV announcers (NBC): Al Michaels, Cris Collinsworth, and Michele Tafoya
- Recap
  Gamebook

Game information

First quarter

- DET – Will Heller 10-yard pass from Matthew Stafford (Jason Hanson kick) Lions 7–0, Drive: 8 plays, 80 yards, 4:02.

Second quarter

- NO – Darren Sproles 2-yard run, (John Kasay kick), Tied 7–7, Drive: 11 plays, 89 yards, 5:19.
- DET – Calvin Johnson 13-yard pass from Matthew Stafford (Jason Hanson kick), Lions 14–7, Drive: 9 plays, 87 yards, 4:50.
- NO – John Kasay 24-yard field goal Lions 14–10, Drive:

Third quarter

- NO – Devery Henderson 41-yard pass from Drew Brees (John Kasay kick), Saints 17–14, Drive: 4 plays, 78 yards, 1:51.
- NO – Jimmy Graham 3-yard pass from Drew Brees (John Kasay kick), Saints 24–14, Drive: 13 plays, 92 yards, 6;27.
- DET – Matthew Stafford 1 yard (Jason Hanson kick), Saints 24–21, Drive: 8 plays, 80 yards, 2:55.

Fourth quarter

- NO – Darren Sproles 17 yard (John Kasay kick), Saints 31–21, Drive: 14 plays, 80 yards, 6:15.
- NO – Robert Meachem 56-yard pass from Drew Brees (John Kasay kick), Saints 38–21, Drive: 4 plays, 61 yards, 2:14.
- DET – Calvin Johnson 12-yard pass from Matthew Stafford (Jason Hanson kick), Saints 38–28, Drive: 9 plays, 79 yards, 2:49.
- NO – Pierre Thomas 1-yard run (John Kasay kick), Saints 45–28, Drive: 4 plays, 44 yards, 1:04.

Top passers

- DET – Matthew Stafford – 28/43, 380 yards, 3 touchdowns, 2 interceptions
- NO – Drew Brees – 33/43, 466 yards, 3 touchdowns

Top rushers

- DET – Kevin Smith – 6 carries, 21 yards
- NO – Pierre Thomas – 8 carries, 66 yards, 1 touchdown

Top receivers

- DET – Calvin Johnson – 12 receptions, 211 yards, 2 touchdowns
- NO – Marques Colston – 7 receptions, 120 yards

Top tacklers

- DET – Stephen Tulloch – 8 tackles, 7 assists
- NO – Tracy Porter – 7 tackles

Entering the postseason as the NFC's #6 seed, the Lions began their playoff run at the Mercedes-Benz Superdome for the NFC Wild Card game against the #3 seed New Orleans Saints, looking to avenge their Week 13 defeat.

Detroit struck first in the opening quarter as quarterback Matthew Stafford found tight end Will Heller with a 10-yard pass for a touchdown. The Saints answered in the second quarter when running back Darren Sproles scored a touchdown with a 2-yard run. The Lions answered back when Calvin Johnson caught a 13-yard pass for a touchdown. New Orleans closed out the half when kicker John Kasay scored a 24-yard field goal.

The Saints took the lead in the third quarter when quarterback Drew Brees completed a 41-yard touchdown pass to wide receiver Devery Henderson and later, a 3-yard touchdown pass to tight end Jimmy Graham. Detroit kept things close when Matthew Stafford scored a touchdown with a quarterback sneak from 1 yard out. New Orleans took a huge lead in the fourth quarter when Darren Sproles scored with a 17-yard touchdown run, followed by a 56-yard touchdown catch by wide receiver Robert Meachem. The Lions tried to rally as Stafford connected with Johnson again with a 12-yard touchdown pass, but the Saints pulled away for good with a 1-yard touchdown run by Pierre Thomas.

== Regular season statistical leaders ==
	Player(s)	Value	NFL Rank	NFC Rank
Passing yards	Matthew Stafford	5038 Yards	3rd	2nd
Passing touchdowns	Matthew Stafford	41 TDs	3rd	3rd
Rushing yards	Jahvid Best	390 Yards	56th	27th
Rushing touchdowns	Kevin Smith	4 TDs	T-31st	T-16th
Receptions	Calvin Johnson	96 Receptions	4th	3rd
Receiving yards	Calvin Johnson	1681 Yards	1st	1st
Receiving touchdowns	Calvin Johnson	16 TDs	2nd	1st
Points	Jason Hanson	126 Points	9th	5th
Kickoff Return Yards	Stefan Logan	832 Yards	11th	6th
Punt return Yards	Stefan Logan	301 Yards	T-15th	7th
Tackles	Stephen Tulloch	111 Tackles	17th	10th
Sacks	Cliff Avril	11 Sacks	T-11th	T-7th
Interceptions	Chris Houston	5 INTs	T-8th	T-6th

Stats are updated each week.

== Awards, honors, and records ==
Matthew Stafford

- AP NFL Comeback Player of the Year
- PFWA Comeback Player of the Year
- NFL Alumni's Quarterback of the Year
- 4th quarterback in NFL history to pass for 5,000+ yards in a season (after Dan Marino, Drew Brees twice, and Tom Brady)
- 2nd quarterback in NFL history to throw for over 40 touchdowns and 5,000 yards at the age of 23. (Dan Marino)

Calvin Johnson

- 2011 All-Pro Team
- 2011 Pro Bowl
- 2011 NFL receiving yards leader
- Madden 13 cover athlete
