= Johnny Culbreath =

American football player (born 1988)

No. 72
- Position: Offensive tackle

Personal information
- Born: May 18, 1988 (age 38); Monroe, Georgia, U.S.
- Listed height: 6 ft 5 in (1.96 m)
- Listed weight: 322 lb (146 kg)

Career information
- High school: Monroe
- College: South Carolina State
- NFL draft: 2011: 7th round, 209th overall pick

Career history
- Detroit Lions (2011–2012)
- Stats at Pro Football Reference

Johnny Culbreath (born May 18, 1988) is an American former professional football offensive tackle. He was selected by the Detroit Lions in the seventh round of the 2011 NFL draft. He played college football at South Carolina State.

== Early life ==
Leshoure attended Monroe Area High School in Monroe, Georgia. He earned all-region honors as a football player, and chose to continue his career at South Carolina State.

Culbreath was also a state champion in wrestling.

== College career ==
Culbreath was a four-year starter on the South Carolina State team, starting all but three games over the course of his collegiate career. Prior to his senior season in 2010, Culbreath received several preseason awards and was named one of the team's captains. A three-time FCS third-team All-American, Culbreath was an NFL draft prospect after the conclusion of his senior year.

Culbreath graduated from South Carolina State with a bachelor's degree in Industrial Technology.

== Professional career ==
Pre-draft measurables
Height	Weight	40-yard dash	10-yard split	20-yard split	20-yard shuttle	Three-cone drill	Vertical jump	Broad jump	Bench press
6 ft 5 1/8 in (1.96 m)	322 lb (146 kg)	5.02 s	1.86 s	2.89 s	4.83 s	7.76 s	30.5 in (0.77 m)	9 ft 0 in (2.74 m)	27 reps
All values from Pro Day

Culbreath was taken with the 209th overall pick in the seventh round of the 2011 NFL draft by the Detroit Lions. On September 3, 2011, Culbreath was placed on injured reserve with an undisclosed illness, where he spent the rest of the season. After the season, Culbreath revealed to the Detroit Free Press, that it was due to a recurrence of high blood pressure during training camp.

On January 23, 2012, Culbreath was arrested for simple possession of marijuana at a hotel in Orangeburg, S.C.

On July 24, 2012, Culbreath was released by the team after losing a training camp roster battle to Jason Curtis Fox and Corey Hilliard. During his brief professional career, Culbreath never played in an NFL game.
