= Corey Jackson =

Corey Jackson may refer to:

- Corey Jackson (athlete) (born 1978), American basketball and football player.
- Corey Jackson (rapper) (born 2006), American rapper
- Corey Jackson (politician) (born 1982), member of the California State Assembly
- William "Corey" Jackson (1977–2011), see Shooting of Corey Jackson
