= Good Deeds Global =

Good Deeds Global Inc.
- Company type: Private
- Website type: Social Network Service; Online Service
- Founded: Houston, Texas, U.S.
- Area served: Worldwide
- Founder: Corey S. Davis
- Key people: Corey Shoblom Davis (CEO); Ken Melancon (COO); Tom Mesa (CFO)
- Industry: Internet
- Website: GoodDeedsGlobal.com
- Launched: March 19, 2012
- Current status: Inactive

Good Deeds Global was an Internet-based social business, and social movement organization structured around the "pay it forward" and "good deeds" concept.

== Business model ==
The Good Deeds Global company had a unique hybrid business model utilizing the philanthropy aspect of a charity organization integrated into an online business that was supported by a grassroots social movement spearheaded by its founders.

The Good Deeds Global website offered a variety of free services to its users that included a social networking service called "Your Life", and a wish granting out-reach service called "Request A Good Deed".

== Impact ==
=== Social movement ===
The Founder of Good Deeds Global Corey Shoblom Davis along with Co-Founder Ken Melancon have been seen in a variety of cities throughout the United States handing out various amounts of free money to people in an effort to promote and encourage the pay it forward philosophy, in addition to supporting the random act of kindness concept.
