= Corey Smith (artist) =

American artist and snowboarder

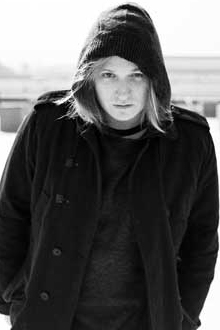
- Corey Smith in 2011
- Born: October 3, 1977 (age 48); San Francisco, California
- Education: Pacific Northwest College of Art
- Known for: Painting, photography, sculpture
- Website: "COREY SMITH – TIME TRAVEL". "SPRING BREAK SNOWBOARDS".

Corey Smith (born October 3, 1977) is a contemporary American painter, sculptor, photographer, professional snowboarder, and snowboard designer. Smith was the art director at COMUNE, curator and founder of their Drop City artist collective (which he is no longer a part of), and a contributing artist for CAPiTA Snowboards. In addition, Smith founded the snowboard company Spring Break Snowboards.

== Biography ==
Corey Smith was born in San Francisco, California. In 1996, he graduated from Canby High School, and in 2006, Smith graduated from Pacific Northwest College of Art with a Bachelor of Fine Arts in Graphic Design and Photography.

=== Career ===
==== Snowboarding ====
Corey Smith began snowboarding at the age of 16, at his home mountain Mount Hood Meadows. From 2003 to 2006 Smith coached at Windells Snowboard Camp. Smith has appeared in several notable snowboarding feature films such as, Neoproto (2003, Neoproto Films), Everyday Something (2004, Neoproto Films), Some Kinda Life (2005, Neoproto Films), Love/Hate (2005 Kids Know Productions). During Smith's professional snowboarding he was sponsored by Capita snowboards, Holden, Flux, Electric, ThirtyTwo, Grenade. He has been featured in interviews and editorial photos in several international snowboarding magazines such as, Transworld Snowboarding (USA), Snowboarder Magazine (USA), Snowboard Magazine (USA), Future Snowboard (USA), Frequency: The Snowboarder's Journal, Method (Europe), Onboard (Europe), Desillusion (France), Snowboard Canada (Canada), Transfer (New Zealand), Arkade (Utah, USA).

In early 2010 he designed and created hand-crafted avant garde snowboard shapes inspired by vintage surf boards. This experiment in contemporary snowboard design was entitled Spring Break Snowboards.

==== Art ====
Smith early artwork was influenced by his involvement in snowboarding and skateboarding culture. His first solo exhibition was at KCDC in Brooklyn, NY. He has been contributing artwork and graphics for CAPiTA Snowboards for over ten years. Graphics for Birdhouse Skateboards pro skateboarder Ragdoll. promodel bindings for Flux. Smith has been featured in FHM, Maxim, Mean, Complex, Nylon Guys. Smith's first European show is at the Vans Wängl Tängl 2012 in Mayrhofen.

== Art exhibitions ==
=== Solo exhibitions ===
2016

- One Grand Gallery, "A Smile is a Dream My Heart Makes", Portland, OR
- Nemo Design, "Slush Slashers and Powder Racers", Portland, OR

2015

- Paul Loya Gallery, "The Church of Quantum Interconnectedness", Culver City, CA

2013

- Backspace Gallery, "End Your Pain", Portland, OR

2011

- AR4T Gallery, "Become a Better You", Laguna Beach, CA
- Coral Canyon Gallery, "Red Dot Art Fair" – Miami, FL

2010

- Worksound Gallery, "Obsolete Dreams", Portland, OR

2009

- Backspace Gallery, "Air Superiority and Obsolete Dreams", Portland, OR

2008

- Light Gallery, "Fuck Yeah Bro!", Costa Mesa, CA
- Backspace Gallery, "Drop Out, Not Bombs", Portland, OR
- Fice, "Jesus I Trust in You", Salt Lake City, Ut.

2007

- Mark Wooley Gallery, "Affair at the Jupiter Hotel", Portland, OR
- The Closet, "Liar's Laughter", Santa Monica, CA

2006

- Sugar Gallery, "Seven Day Weekend", Portland, OR
- The Camp Gallery, "Key to the City". Costa Mesa, CA
- Backspace Gallery, "It's Not Gay If It's For Drugs", Portland, OR
- Rake Art Gallery, "Ultra Artsy", Portland, OR
- Seven Gallery, "Let the Good Times Roll", Portland, OR

2005

- Neverender Gallery, "Zerocharisma", Reno, NV
- Circle Gallery, "Zerocharisma", Salt Lake City, UT
- Nemo Design, "Looking Good is Better Than Feeling Good", Portland, OR
- Backspace Gallery, "Zerocharisma", Portland, OR

2004

- Street Machine Gallery, "Nice Life", San Diego, CA
- Backspace Gallery, "Nice Life", Portland, OR

2003

- KCDC Gallery, "Nice Life", Williamsburg, NY

== See also ==
- Skateboarding Culture
