= Corey Harwell =

American neuroscientist

- Education: MIT
- Scientific career
- Fields: Developmental Neurobiology
- Workplaces: Harvard Medical School
- Doctoral advisor: Elly Nedivi

Corey C. Harwell is an American neuroscientist who is an assistant professor in the Department of Neurobiology at Harvard Medical School.

== Career ==
Harwell initially planned on pursuing a career in medicine, an early research experience in Cori Bargmann's laboratory led Harwell instead to the basic sciences and in particular to neurobiology. As a graduate student, Harwell conducted his thesis research at the Massachusetts Institute of Technology under Elly Nedivi. He studied the role of the gene cpg15 (candidate plasticity gene 15) and its protein product in neural development and plasticity. Cpg15 had been found to be a target of intracellular signaling pathways important for synaptic plasticity. Increases in cpg15 expression caused changes in axon and dendrite growth, as well as synapse formation. Harwell and his colleague Ulrich Putz showed that expression of a soluble form of CPG15 promoted survival of cortical neuron progenitors in early brain development. Additionally, Harwell, with members of Karel Svoboda's group, demonstrated that cpg15 expression in adult mice could be diminished by sensory deprivation, raising the possibility that CPG15 functions in a neural activity-dependent manner.

After receiving his PhD, Harwell completed a postdoctoral fellowship in Arnold Kriegstein's laboratory at the University of California, San Francisco. There, Harwell investigated early neural development. He identified a role of the gene sonic hedgehog (shh) and its receptor, BOC1, in the formation of connections between layer II/III cortical neurons and their postsynaptic targets, the layer V corticofugal neurons. Additionally, Harwell characterized the relationship between cell lineage and distribution of developing cortical interneuron circuits and found that cell lineage does not determine clustering of cortical interneurons

Following his postdoctoral work, Harwell became an assistant professor at Harvard Medical School in the Department of Neurobiology. In 2021, his laboratory moved to the University of California, San Francisco. His laboratory continues to focus on neural development.

== Research ==
The Harwell Lab investigates how the developmental origins and lineages of different neuron types affects their function in the adult brain. The lab approaches these questions using circuit tracing, molecular biology, and genetic tools in mice. Currently, the lab seeks to characterize the molecular diversity of neural progenitors and dissect the genetic and epigenetic programs that drive the differentiation of these progenitors and their assembly into functional neural circuits. Recently, the lab has uncovered important roles for glial cells in neural development as well.
