= Cory Williams (disambiguation) =

Cory Williams (born 1981), also known as "Mr. Safety", is an American internet personality.

Cory Williams may also refer to:

- Cory Williams (cyclist) (born 1993), Belizean-American cyclist
- Cory Devante Williams (born 1992), American YouTuber, writer and actor
- Cory T. Williams, American attorney and Democratic politician in Oklahoma

== See also ==
- Corey Williams (disambiguation)
