= Corey Davis =

Corey Davis may refer to:

- Corey Davis (offensive lineman) (born 1985), American football offensive lineman
- Corey Davis (wide receiver) (born 1995), American football wide receiver
- Corey Davis Jr. (born 1997), American basketball player
- Corey Shoblom Davis (born 1979), American entrepreneur and philanthropist
