= Corey Smith =

Corey Smith may refer to:

- Corey Smith (American football) (1979–2009), American football defensive end
- Corey Smith (artist) (born 1977), American artist and snowboarder
- Corey Smith (musician) (born 1979), American country/rock/blues singer and guitarist
- Christopher Corey Smith (born 1962), American voice actor
