= Mike Donnelly (American football) =

American football coach (1952–2017)

Biographical details
- Born: c. 1952; Albany, New York, U.S.
- Died: October 4, 2017 (aged 64–65); Allentown, New York, U.S.
- Education: Ithaca College (1975)

Playing career

Football
- 1971–1974: Ithaca

Track and field
- 1971–1974: Ithaca
- Positions: Linebacker (football); Javelin (track and field)

Coaching career (HC unless noted)

Football
- 1975: Whitman HS (NY) (assistant)
- 1976: Albany (GA)
- 1977: East Stroudsburg (GA)
- 1978–1979: RPI (DC)
- 1980–1982: Ithaca (DC)
- 1983–1987: Lafayette (LB)
- 1988–1989: Lafayette (DC/LB)
- 1990–1991: Buffalo (DC/LB)
- 1992–1996: Columbia (DC/LB)
- 1997–2017: Muhlenberg

Track and field
- 1977–1978: RPI
- 1979–1982: Ithaca

Head coaching record
- Overall: 143–76 (football)
- Tournaments: 2–5 (NCAA D-III playoffs)

Accomplishments and honors

Championships
- 7 Centennial (2001–2004, 2007–2008, 2010)

Michael B. "Duke" Donnelly (c. 1952 – October 4, 2017) was an American college football coach. He was the head coach for Muhlenberg College from 1997 until his death in 2017. He also coached for Whitman High School, Albany, East Stroudsburg, RPI, Ithaca, Lafayette, Buffalo, and Columbia. He played college football for Ithaca as a linebacker.

Donnelly also coached track and field for Rensselaer Polytechnic Institute and Ithaca College.

Donnelly died from Leukemia on October 4, 2017.

== Head coaching record ==
=== Football ===
Year	Team	Overall	Conference	Standing	Bowl/playoffs	D3^{#}
Muhlenberg Mules (Centennial Conference) (1997–2017)
1997	Muhlenberg	1–9	1–6	7th		
1998	Muhlenberg	5–5	3–4	5th		
1999	Muhlenberg	6–4	4–3	T–3rd		
2000	Muhlenberg	9–2	5–2	T–2nd		
2001	Muhlenberg	7–4	5–1	T–1st		
2002	Muhlenberg	10–2	5–1	T–1st	L NCAA Division III Second Round	
2003	Muhlenberg	7–3	5–1	T–1st		
2004	Muhlenberg	8–3	4–2	T–1st		
2005	Muhlenberg	3–7	2–4	T–5th		
2006	Muhlenberg	5–5	2–4	T–5th		
2007	Muhlenberg	11–1	8–0	1st	L NCAA Division III Second Round	8
2008	Muhlenberg	9–2	7–1	1st	L NCAA Division III First Round	25
2009	Muhlenberg	3–7	2–6	T–7th		
2010	Muhlenberg	7–4	7–2	T–1st	L NCAA Division III First Round	
2011	Muhlenberg	7–3	7–2	2nd		
2012	Muhlenberg	8–3	7–2	2nd		
2013	Muhlenberg	8–3	7–2	2nd		
2014	Muhlenberg	9–2	8–1	2nd	L NCAA Division III First Round	23
2015	Muhlenberg	8–3	7–2	T–2nd		
2016	Muhlenberg	9–2	8–1	2nd		
2017	Muhlenberg	3–2 (Note: Corey Goff served as acting head coach for the first five weeks of the season and the games are still reflected on Donnelly's totals. Following Donnelly's death, Goff served as interim for the remaining six games and finished the season 8–3 overall.)	2–2			
Muhlenberg:		143–76	106–49			
Total:		143–76				
National championship Conference title Conference division title or championship game berth
