= Hitz 247 =

Australia
- Broadcast area: Australia
- Branding: Hitz 247

Programming
- Language: English
- Format: College radio Contemporary hit radio

Ownership
- Owner: Hitz Entertainment

History
- First air date: 30 December 2011

Links
- Website: hitz247.com.au

Hitz 247 is a youth contemporary hit radio-formatted internet radio station, based in Melbourne, Victoria, Australia. Founded by Andrew Gyopar and born out of former aspirant community station Hitz FM, the station began streaming online on 30 December 2011.

As well as providing programming that appeals to its young audience Hitz 247 also actively encourages young people to become involved with the station. Listeners are encouraged to produce and present radio programs and to contribute content to the stations website.

Hitz 247 also supports numerous non-profit youth organisations, increasing awareness of such organisations among its young listeners.

== History ==
Hitz 247 started broadcasting on the internet at 9am on Friday 30 December 2011. The first song played on the station was Zoe Badwi’s "Carry Me Home".

In mid-2011 Hitz 247 conducted a survey called Build Your Own Radio Station. Over 1,000 young Australians were surveyed about their musical preferences and radio listening habits. The responses formed the basis of the programming policies of Hitz 247.

Hitz 247 was inspired by Melbourne aspirant youth community radio station Hitz FM

=== Hitz FM ===
Hitz FM

Melbourne
- Broadcast area: Melbourne, Australia
- Frequency: 89.9 MHz FM
- Branding: Hitz FM

Programming
- Language: English
- Format: College radio

Ownership
- Owner: Hitz FM Broadcasters Inc

History
- First air date: 4 December 1992
- Last air date: 6 November 2001

Technical information
- Class: Temporary Community Broadcasting Licence (TCBL)
- ERP: 56 kW

Links
- Website: Hitz FM

Hitz FM was an aspirant youth-formatted community radio station in Melbourne, which ran a series of test broadcasts between 1992 and 2001 on the then-vacant frequency of 89.9 MHz FM. Run predominantly by volunteers, the station limited involvement to people under the age of 30. In 2001, the Australian Broadcasting Authority chose SYN FM over Hitz FM for a youth licence and the station was disbanded.

Test Broadcasts

Broadcast dates	Studio location	
Broadcast dates	4 December 1992 – 13 December 1992	John Gardener Secondary College, Hawthorn
3 July 1993 – 18 July 1993	Xavier College, Kew	
8 December 1993 – 11 March 1994	Station Street, Moorabbin	
15 December 1994 - 28 January 1995; 7 April 1995 - 29 April 1995; 22 September 1995 - 14 October 1995; 29 December 1995 - 27 January 1996; 21 June 1996 - 20 July 1996; 13 September 1996 - 12 October 1996; 27 December 1996 - 25 January 1997; 20 June 1997 - 19 July 1997; 19 September 1997 - 17 October 1997; 26 December 1997 - 24 January 1998; 13 April 1998 - 7 June 1998; 12 December 1998 - 24 January 1999; 26 July 1999 - 5 September 1999; 7 February 2000 - 12 March 2000; 4 September 2000 - 8 October 2000; 26 February 2001 - 1 April 2001; 9 October 2001 – 6 November 2001	Level 9, 505 St Kilda Road, Melbourne	

=== Notable alumni ===
Like Hitz 247, Hitz FM was a training ground for aspiring professional radio presenters. Notable Hitz FM alumni include:

- Andrew Gyopar (Founding Member)
- Anton Vanderlely (Founder)
- Corey Layton (Southern Cross Austereo)
- Gabriel McGrath (Founding Member)
- James Ash
- Julie Doyle (Founding Member, ABC News 24)
- Mary-Jane Fenech (Senior Producer, ABC Radio Melbourne)
- Nick Karlas (Founder)
- Ty Frost (smoothfm 91.5)
- Orion Kelsall (3GG)
- Paul Dowsley (Seven News)

== Programming ==
Hitz 247 relied upon the responses from its Build Your Own Radio Station survey in developing its playlist and programming at its launch in 2011.

The station plays mostly pop music and has a strong bias towards Australian music. Approximately half of the music played on Hitz 247 is by Australian artists. The station also features a lot of new music in its playlist.

The programs on Hitz 247 are all presented by people under the age of 30. As such, the programs are presented from a youth perspective. In order for Hitz 247 to exclude people over the age of 30 from participating in programming it sought government approval for an exemption under the Equal Opportunity Act.

Hitz 247 encourages unsigned Australian musicians to submit their musical recordings to the station for addition to its playlist. Aspiring radio presenters are encouraged to become involved in the stations programming.
