= Cory Johnson =

Cory Johnson may refer to:

- Cory Johnson (basketball) (born 1988), American basketball player
- Cory Johnson (gridiron football) (born 1992), American football defensive lineman

== See also ==
- Corey Johnson (disambiguation)
