= Jefferson Rams =

- University: Thomas Jefferson University
- Nickname: Rams
- NCAA: Division II
- Conference: CACC
- Athletic director: Corey Goff
- Location: Philadelphia, Pennsylvania
- Varsity teams: 17
- Basketball arena: Gallagher Center
- Baseball stadium: Alumni Field
- Soccer stadium: Ravenhill Field
- Rowing venue: Crescent Boat Club
- Tennis venue: Abraham J. Salaman '58 Tennis Courts
- Colors: Deep blue and Bright blue
- Website: jeffersonrams.com

The Jefferson Rams (formerly the Philadelphia Textile Rams and the Philadelphia Rams) are the athletic teams that represent Thomas Jefferson University, located in Philadelphia, Pennsylvania, in intercollegiate sports as a member of the NCAA Division II ranks, primarily competing as a member of the Central Atlantic Collegiate Conference (CACC) since the 2005–06 academic year; while its women's golf and women's rowing teams compete as Independents. The Rams previously competed in the East Coast Conference (originally known as the New York Collegiate Athletic Conference until 2006) from 1991–92 to 2004–05.

== Varsity teams ==
Jefferson sponsors 17 varsity intercollegiate teams: Men's sports include baseball, basketball, cross country, golf, soccer, tennis and track & field; while women's sports include basketball, cross country, golf, lacrosse, rowing, soccer, softball, tennis, track & field and volleyball.

== National championships ==
=== Team ===
Sport	Association	Division	Year	Opponent/Runner-up	Score
Men's Basketball (1)	NCAA	College	1970	Tennessee State	76–65

== Individual programs ==
=== Men's basketball ===
The university is known for its men's basketball program, particularly coach Herb Magee, who became the most successful men's basketball coach in NCAA history on February 23, 2010, and was inducted into the Class of 2011 of the Naismith Memorial Basketball Hall of Fame. Magee served 54 years as coach at Philadelphia University, highlighted by an NCAA Division II Basketball Championship in 1970. Magee was awarded the honorary degree of Doctor of Humane Letters by President Stephen Spinelli Jr. at Philadelphia University's 125th Commencement in 2009.

=== Women's basketball ===
The university women's basketball program is under coach Tom Shirley. Shirley has won 607 games, which places him sixth on the NCAA DII career wins list and 30th on the NCAA all-divisions career coaching wins list. On January 19, 2011, Shirley got his 600th win as the Rams defeated Chestnut Hill College 76–60.

=== Baseball ===
The Rams baseball program is currently led by Pat Horvath, who is heading into his 15th season as head coach. In 2024, the program set a school record with 33 wins, leading to an NCAA Regional appearance. The program has produced multiple professional players, to include Bob File, Curtis King, and Abraham Almonte.

=== Women's rowing ===
In the 2006–2007 season, Philadelphia University started a rowing program under head coach Chris O'Brien. In its inaugural season it won the Dad Vail Regatta in the Women's Novice Heavy Eight. The 2008–2009 season was also notable for the success of the men's and women's tennis teams, with both winning the CACC championships.

=== Women's soccer ===
Jefferson Women's Soccer is the first program to win three straight CACC titles in women's soccer since at least the 2000 season, according to available records. Jefferson's win in 2021 comes after consecutive wins in 2019 and 2020. This marked the Rams' sixth CACC Championship in program history. In 2021, Jefferson also earned its fourth NCAA Tournament appearance (2014, 2015, 2019), and the Rams made back-to-back trips for the second time. There was no NCAA Tournament contested in the 2020–21 academic year due to the COVID-19 pandemic.
