= Irving Corey =

WWI Canadian military pilot

Irving Banfield Corey
- Born: August 30, 1892; Kingscroft, Quebec, Canada
- Died: April 18, 1976 (aged 83); Beebe Plain, Quebec, Canada
- Military career
- Allegiance: George V of the British Empire
- Branch: Aviation
- Rank: Second lieutenant
- Unit: No. 103 Squadron RAF
- Awards: Distinguished Flying Cross

Second Lieutenant Irving Banfield Corey DFC (August 30, 1892 – April 18, 1976) was a Canadian World War I flying ace credited with six aerial victories. He was awarded the Distinguished Flying Cross in the 1919 Birthday Honours.
