= Ricardo Silva (American football) =

American football player (born 1988)

No. 39
- Position: Safety

Personal information
- Born: May 9, 1988 (age 38); Baltimore, Maryland, U.S.
- Listed height: 6 ft 2 in (1.88 m)
- Listed weight: 210 lb (95 kg)

Career information
- High school: Baltimore Polytechnic Institute
- College: Hampton
- NFL draft: 2011: undrafted

Career history
- Detroit Lions (2011−2012); Carolina Panthers (2013)*
- * Offseason or practice squad member only

Career NFL statistics
- Total tackles: 43
- Fumble recoveries: 1
- Interceptions: 1
- Stats at Pro Football Reference

Ricardo Silva (born May 9, 1988) is an American former professional football player who was a safety in the National Football League (NFL). He played college football for the Hampton Pirates.

== College career ==
Silva started his college football career at Bowie State University, before transferring to Hampton University for his junior and senior seasons. He exploded his senior season (74 tackles, 11 pass breakups, 4 interceptions, 3 forced fumbles, and 1 interception returned for a touchdown) making First-team All Mid-Eastern Athletic Conference, First-team HBCU All-American, and barely missing out being selected on the FCS All-American team.

== Professional career ==
=== Detroit Lions ===
In 2011, he signed with the Detroit Lions to their practice squad. Silva was signed the active roster in week 12, finishing the season and including the playoffs playing primarily special teams. The following year Ricardo Silva played so well in the 2012 preseason that he just barely missed opening the season on the 53 man active roster. Coach Schwartz actually said Silva was the last man cut. The lions soon after signed Ricardo Silva to their practice squad. Starting FS Louis Delmas injured his knee early in the year leading to Ricardo Silva being activated to the 53 man roster in the early weeks of 2012. Silva's second season ended totaling 6 starts, 40 tackles and 1 interception,1 fumble recovery on the year. On August 1, 2013, the Detroit Lions released Silva.

=== Carolina Panthers ===
On August 2, 2013, Silva was claimed off waivers by the Carolina Panthers. On August 24, 2013, he was waived by the Panthers.

=== Teaching career ===
Ricardo Silva joined Teach for America in 2014 and taught Geometry at Ballou High School in Washington D.C.

=== Loan Officer ===
Ricardo worked as an Account Executive prior to being promoted to Assistant Vice President at New Day USA. He is now currently employed as a Loan Officer with First Home Mortgage in Maryland.
