= Corey Robinson =

Corey Robinson may refer to:

- Corey Robinson (offensive tackle) (born 1992), American football offensive tackle for the Jacksonville Jaguars
- Corey Robinson (quarterback) (born 1990), American football quarterback for Troy
- Corey Robinson (wide receiver) (born 1995), American football wide receiver for Notre Dame
- Corey Parker Robinson (born 1975), American actor
