= Elly Nedivi =

American neuroscientist

- אלי נדיבי
- Born: Israel

Academic background
- Education: BSc, 1982, Biology and Biochemistry, Hebrew University of Jerusalem; PhD., 1991, Neuroscience, Stanford University

Academic work
- Institutions: Cold Spring Harbor Laboratory; Massachusetts Institute of Technology
- Main interests: brain plasticity
- Website: nedivilab.mit.edu

Elly Nedivi (Hebrew: אלי נדיבי) is an American neuroscientist. She is a professor of brain and cognitive sciences at the Picower Institute for Learning and Memory and the William R. (1964) and Linda R. Young Professor at the Massachusetts Institute of Technology.

== Early life and education ==
Nedivi earned her Bachelor of Science from the Hebrew University of Jerusalem and her PhD in neuroscience from Stanford University.

== Career ==
Upon joining the brain and cognitive sciences faculty at the Massachusetts Institute of Technology, Nedivi was awarded a 1999 Sloan Research Fellowship. The next year, Nedivi and her research team discovered molecules in adult brains that allowed the organ to grow and change. Based on her discovery, Nedivi, Jeffrey Cottrell, and colleagues from Yale University identified a gene that suggests that the brain's plasticity gene 2 and the protein it encodes are important in balancing receptor turnover. As a result, her research suggests that scientists could manipulate the genes to allow for faster learning. Upon conducting further research, she found that the gene cpg15 was vital to the survival of neural stem cells in early development. She was subsequently granted Academic tenure the following year and named an American Federation for Aging Research 2007 Julie Martin Mid-Career Award in Aging Research grantee.

As the Fred and Carole Middleton Assistant Professor of Neurobiology, she conducted a study to find the possibility of growing new cells to replace ones damaged by disease or spinal cord injury. By 2008, her research team discovered that a type of neuron related to Autism spectrum disorders developed in a thin strip of brain tissue at the upper border of cortical layer 2. This discovery could allow for the possibility to force growth in cells that would normally be unable to repair themselves.

In 2016, she was elected a Fellow of the American Association for the Advancement of Science for her contributions to the field of neuroscience. That same year, she found that a protein known as CPG2 was important in regulating the receptor reabsorption and its connections between neurons. Three years later, she discovered that people with less abundant CPG2 were more likely to suffer from bipolar disorder. By November, Nedivi was appointed the inaugural William R. (1964) And Linda R. Young Professor.
