= Corey Anderson =

Corey Anderson may refer to:

- Corey Anderson (fighter) (born 1989), American mixed martial artist
- Corey Anderson (cricketer) (born 1990), New Zealand cricketer
- Corey Anderson (javelin thrower) (born 2000), Australian javelin thrower
