= Corey Arnold =

American photographer

- Born: March 25, 1976 (age 50); Vista, California, U.S.
- Education: Northern Arizona University (attended); Academy of Art University (BFA, Photography)
- Occupations: Photographer, commercial fisherman
- Years active: 2002–present
- Known for: Fine art, documentary, and commercial photography
- Notable work: Fish-Work photography project, Fish-Work: The Bering Sea (book)
- Television: Deadliest Catch (Season 2)
- Awards: Pictures of the Year International – 1st Place Feature Photo Story (2017)
- Website: coreyfishes.com

Corey Arnold (born March 25, 1976) is an American fine art, documentary, and commercial photographer and commercial fisherman, based in Portland, Oregon. His work explores man's relationship with the natural world, animals, and environmental issues with a primary focus on the Alaskan wilderness. Since 2002 he has photographed his life at sea while working as a Bering Sea crab fisherman and during his summers as a captain of a Bristol Bay sockeye salmon fishing boat in Alaska.

== Early life and education ==
Arnold was born in Vista, California, and grew up there. He has discussed the positive influence of his father, an avocado farmer, sport fisherman, and a photography enthusiast. Arnold and his father fished together throughout Arnold's childhood, including going to Alaska in the summers where Arnold first witnessed the Alaskan commercial fishing industry.

Arnold attended Northern Arizona University in Flagstaff, Arizona and earned his BFA in Photography at the Academy of Art University in San Francisco, California.

== Career ==
After graduating from college, Arnold decided to find work in Alaskan fisheries and photograph his experiences. He has said, "The sea is a great mystery to me. You never know what might show up in the net, pot, or hook. I love to photograph the creatures that we encounter: seabirds, marine mammals, octopus, the waves, the weather and the men and woman who live for it. I want give the viewer a visceral experience of what fish-work is all about. I also aim to educate the public about where our food comes from and talk about ways that commercial fishing and environmentalism can co-exist." This body of work became Fish-Work, an ongoing photography project documenting Arnold's experiences of life at sea.

Two years into his career as a Bering Sea fisherman, the Discovery Channel show Deadliest Catch began filming. Arnold appears in Season Two of Deadliest Catch, and one of his photographs ran on a billboard in Times Square advertising the show.

His photographs have been exhibited widely and published in The New Yorker, National Geographic, The Paris Review, Time, The New York Times, California Sunday Magazine, Harper's, Outside, Esquire, The Guardian, and Juxtapoz, among others.

== Awards and grants ==
- 2017 Pictures of the Year International – 1st Place Feature Photo Story for "Unplugging the Selfie Generation" National Geographic Magazine

== Published books ==
Two books on Arnold's work have been published by Nazraeli Press: a 2011 monograph entitled Fish-Work: The Bering Sea and a 2011 titled Fishing with My Dad 1978–1995.

== Personal life ==
Arnold has worked seasonally as a commercial fisherman in Alaska since 1995, including seven years of crabbing in the Bering Sea aboard the f/v Rollo. He now captains a commercial gillnetter, harvesting wild and sustainable sockeye salmon in Bristol Bay, Alaska while living seasonally in an abandoned salmon cannery complex called Graveyard Point.

Arnold is a vocal opponent to the proposed Pebble Mine in Alaska.

Arnold's cat, Kitty, has been featured in his photographs and was on board the f/v Rollo for two Bering Sea crab seasons. Arnold has said, "She would climb around in the maze of stacked crab pots on deck stalking seabirds. I caught her sneaking up on an eagle that was 5 times her size once, so after that we decided to lock her up in eagle country. She was almost too fearless. She'd come out on deck and stand under dangling 800-pound crab pots. Now she's fat, sleeps all day, and destroys my power cords when she's hungry." He has said that his photograph "Kitty and Horse Fisherman" is "probably the defining photo of my career. It captures a bit of everything I'm interested in as a photographer: The relationship between humans and animals, life at sea, and a bit of strangeness that leaves you with unanswered questions."
