= Corey Woods =

Corey Woods may refer to:

- Corey Woods (mayor), American mayor of Tempe, Arizona
- Corey Woods (born 1970), American rapper known by his stage name, Raekwon
