= Corey Goff =

American athletic director, baseball coach, and football coach (born c. 1973)

Current position
- Title: Athletic director
- Team: Jefferson
- Conference: CACC

Biographical details
- Born: c. 1973 (age 52–53); Montrose, Pennsylvania, U.S.
- Education: Susquehanna University (1995); University at Albany, SUNY (1997)

Playing career

Football
- 1991–1994: Susquehanna

Baseball
- 1991–1994: Susquehanna
- Positions: Tight end (football); Pitcher (baseball)

Coaching career (HC unless noted)

Football
- 1995: Susquehanna (assistant OL)
- 1996: Albany (TE/OL)
- 1997: Dartmouth (TE)
- 1998: Westminster Schools (GA) (OC)
- 1999: Wyoming Seminary (PA)
- 2000–2005: Muhlenberg (AHC/OC)
- 2017: Muhlenberg (acting HC/interim HC)

Baseball
- 1995: Susquehanna (assistant)
- 1998: Westminster Schools (GA) (assistant)
- 1999: Wyoming Seminary (PA)
- 2006–2011: Muhlenberg

Administrative career (AD unless noted)
- 2003–2008: Muhlenberg (assistant AD)
- 2008–2012: Muhlenberg (associate AD)
- 2013–2018: Muhlenberg
- 2018: Muhlenberg (executive AD)
- 2018–2022: Ransom Everglades (FL)
- 2023: FIU (GM)
- 2023–2024: Knox
- 2024–present: Jefferson

Head coaching record
- Overall: 5–1 (college football); 3–6 (high school football); 91–133–2 (college baseball)
- Bowls: 1–0

Corey Goff (born c. 1973) is an American athletic director, baseball coach, and football coach. He is the athletic director for Thomas Jefferson University, a position he has held since 2024.

Goff was the head football coach for Muhlenberg College in 2017 first as an acting head coach and then as the interim head coach following the death of Mike Donnelly. He was the head football coach for Wyoming Seminary in 1999. He also coached for Susquehanna, Albany, Dartmouth, and The Westminster Schools. He played college football for Susquehanna as a tight end.

Goff was the head baseball coach for Muhlenberg College from 2006 to 2011. He was the head baseball coach for Wyoming Seminary in 1999. He also coached for Susquehanna and The Westminster School. He played college baseball for Susquehanna as a pitcher.

Goff was an assistant athletic director for Muhlenberg from 2003 to 2008, associate athletic director from 2008 to 2012, and full-time athletic director from 2013 to 2018. He served as the executive athletic director in 2018. From 2018 to 2022 he was the athletic director for Ransom Everglades School. In 2023, Goff was the general manager for FIU. In 2023, he became the athletic director for Knox College. In 2024, he was hired as the athletic director for Thomas Jefferson University.

== Head coaching record ==
=== College football ===
Year	Team	Overall	Conference	Standing	Bowl/playoffs
Muhlenberg Mules (Centennial Conference) (2017)
2017	Muhlenberg	5–1 (Note: Goff served as acting head coach for the first five weeks of the season and the games are reflected on Mike Donnelly's totals. Following Donnelly's death, Goff served as interim for the remaining six games and finished the season 8–3 overall.)	5–1	T–3rd	W Asa S. Bushnell
Muhlenberg:		5–1	5–1		
Total:		5–1			

=== High school football ===
Year	Team	Overall	Conference	Standing	Bowl/playoffs
Wyoming Seminary Blue Knights () (1999)
1999	Wyoming Seminary	3–6			
Wyoming Seminary:		3–6			
Total:		3–6			

=== College baseball ===
Record table
Season	Team	Overall	Conference	Standing	Postseason
Muhlenberg Mules (Centennial Conference) (2006–2011)
2006	Muhlenberg	9–25	4–14	T–8th	
2007	Muhlenberg	20–20	11–7	4th	
2008	Muhlenberg	15–22–1	8–10	5th	
2009	Muhlenberg	17–19	9–9	T–5th	
2010	Muhlenberg	11–26–1			
2011	Muhlenberg	19–21			
Muhlenberg:		91–133–2			
Total:		91–133–2			
