= Corey Williams =

Corey Williams may refer to:

- Corey Williams (American football) (born 1980), American football defensive tackle for the Detroit Lions
- Corey Williams (basketball, born 1970), American basketball coach and former NBA player
- Corey Williams (basketball, born 1977) (1977–2024), American former basketball player
- Corey Williams (producer) (born 1978), American film producer
- Latif (singer) (Corey Williams, born 1981), American R&B singer and songwriter
- Corey Williams (sprinter), winner of the 1991 and 1992 4 × 400 meter relay at the NCAA Division I Indoor Track and Field Championships

== See also ==
- Cory Williams (disambiguation)
- Korey Williams (born 1987), American football wide receiver
