= Corey Miller =

Corey Miller may refer to:

- Corey Miller (American football) (born 1968), American football player
- Corey Miller (tattoo artist) (born 1967), American tattoo artist and television personality
- C-Murder (born 1971 as Corey Miller), American rapper and convicted murderer

== See also ==
- Cory Miller (born 1988), American soccer player
