= Corey Johnson =

Corey Johnson may refer to:

- Corey Johnson (actor) (born 1961), American actor
- Corey Johnson (American football) (born 1973), former American football player
- Corey Johnson (basketball) (born 1996), Canadian basketball player
- Corey Johnson (murderer) (1968–2021), convicted killer and drug trafficker
- Corey Johnson (politician) (born 1982), former Speaker of the New York City Council
- Corey Johnson (rugby league) (born 2000), English rugby league player
- Sunspot Jonz, American rapper born Corey Johnson

== See also ==
- Cory Johnson (disambiguation)
