= Corey Layton =

Australian radio broadcaster (born 1979)

Corey Layton AKA Captain Turntable (born 19 July 1979 in Melbourne, Australia) is a commercial radio broadcaster.

== Career ==
Layton started his career at youth radio station 89.9 Hitz-FM (Melbourne) as Captain Turntable before hosting the night show at Melbourne's TTFM with Fifi Box and Mixmaster Mikey. In 2000 he won a RAWARD for Best Newcomer On-Air.

Later, Corey moved to Sydney to be a founding member of Nova 96.9 where he also hosted the late night show, dropping the name Captain Turntable. When Nova 100 launched in Melbourne Corey moved back to host the night show where he interviewed Justin Timberlake, Beyoncé Knowles, Red Hot Chili Peppers, Jamiroquai, Orlando Bloom, Liv Tyler, Paris Hilton and many more. Around this same time Corey was in the Nick Giannopoulos film, The Wannabes.

Layton moved behind the scenes at Nova 100 in 2003 working as the Promotions Manager and later as Breakfast Producer for Hughesy & Kate (formerly Hughesy, Kate & Dave). In 2006, he travelled around South America before moving to London to work at Gcap Media as the Commercial Programme Controller for the Xfm, Choice FM and Gold Radio Networks.

In 2008, Corey became the voice of the IRB's Total Rugby TV show broadcast to 154 countries worldwide.

In 2009, Layton returned to Melbourne to work for Austereo where he served as Head of Response & Activation. He is also a voice over artist with RMK.

As of May 2019, he began to work for ARN in Melbourne.
