= Mean (magazine) =

American bi-monthly magazine

- September/October 2005 cover
- Categories: Lifestyle magazine
- Frequency: Bi-monthly
- Publisher: Kashy Khaledi Media
- Founded: 1996; 30 years ago
- First issue: November 1996
- Country: United States
- Based in: Los Angeles
- Language: English
- Website: meanmag.net

Mean (which stands for Music, Entertainment, Art, News) is an American bi-monthly magazine that covers a wide spectrum of pop culture, focusing on celebrities in the fields of music, fashion, art, and film.

== History and profile ==
Mean began as a music zine and alternative magazine in November 1996 and continued in that format through 2001, before being re-launched as a national lifestyle publication in 2004. Mean is published by Kashy Khaledi Media and distributed by Curtis Circulation. Its headquarters is in Los Angeles.

Mean has featured a broad assortment of personalities on its cover. Covers have included Viggo Mortensen, Adrien Brody, Emily Blunt, Samuel L. Jackson and Christina Ricci, Emile Hirsch, Javier Bardem, and Ewan McGregor portraying Woody Allen.
