= Killing of Corey Jackson =

2011 police shooting in Geneva, New York

- Date: May 20, 2011
- Location: Geneva, New York
- Deaths: William "Corey" Jackson
- Accused: Geneva City Police Department

William "Corey" Jackson was a 34-year-old African-American man who was fatally shot by a police officer in Geneva, New York, in May 2011.

== The incident ==
On May 20, 2011, police stopped a car with three men in it. William "Corey" Jackson was in the back seat, and he was wanted in connection with an alleged strong armed robbery that morning with theft of $150, a cell phone and a pack of cigarettes. Sgt. Carmen Reale said Jackson was repeatedly reaching under the seat of the car and then turned toward another officer with an object in his hand. Reale shot through the window, shooting Jackson in the head. Jackson died on May 22 at Strong Memorial Hospital in Rochester, New York.

Geneva Police Chief Frank Pane stated that the sergeant who shot Jackson feared he was armed and possibly reaching for a gun. Police did not find a gun, but they did find two cell phones and a knife. Jackson's father said his son had been texting someone with his phone, telling them he was going to be arrested.

== Aftermath ==
After the killing of Jackson, the civil rights organization NAACP stated that many African Americans and others had contacted it voicing concerns about police harassment in the city. NAACP and family members then hired an independent lawyer to investigate.

An Ontario County Grand Jury found in July 2011 that Sgt. Reale's action was justified under the law, and accepted that the officer was afraid and misidentified a cell phone as a gun.

Sgt. Reale was put on administrative leave (with full pay), and never returned to the force. In January 2014, he officially retired from the Geneva Police Department. He had been with the department for 18 years.
