= Corey White (comedian) =

Australian comedian

Corey White is an Australian comedian whose work draws on traumatic childhood experiences. The story of his childhood was the subject of an episode of Australian Story in 2015 and his TV series Corey White's Roadmap to Paradise premiered on ABC in 2018. He lives in Melbourne. Corey's memoir The Prettiest Horse in the Glue Factory was released in July 2019.
