= Corey Parker =

Corey Parker may refer to:

- Corey Parker (actor) (1965–2026), American actor and acting coach
- Corey Parker (rugby league) (born 1982), Australian rugby league footballer
