= Corey Hart =

Corey Hart may refer to:

- Corey Hart (singer) (born 1962), Canadian musician
  - Corey Hart (album), a 1996 album
- Corey Hart (baseball) (born 1982), American baseball player

== See also ==
- Carey Hart (born 1975), American motocross rider
