= Corey Corbin =

American politician

Member of the New Hampshire House of Representatives from the Rockingham 79th district
- In office 2000–2004

Personal details
- Born: June 12, 1969 (age 57) Augusta, Maine, U.S.
- Party: Republican (2000-2003); Democratic (2003-2004)

Corey Corbin (born June 12, 1969) is a former American politician, who served in the New Hampshire House of Representatives from 2000 to 2004. He represented Rockingham County, and served on the House Labor Committee.

He was first elected as a Republican, but switched to the Democratic Party in 2003 due to opposition to the agenda of Governor Craig Benson.

Corbin served as an infantry officer in the U.S. Army, graduating from the IOBC, Airborne School, and attending the Joint Readiness Training Center.
