= Corey Shoblom Davis =

American entrepreneur and philanthropist

- Born: Corey D. Shoblom Davis; May 24, 1979 (age 46); Seattle, Washington, U.S.
- Occupation: CEO of Good Deeds Global
- Years active: 2012–present
- Website: snApps Website

Corey S. Davis (born Corey D. Shoblom Davis; May 24, 1979) is an American entrepreneur and philanthropist who founded Good Deeds Global. He is also marginally known as Seaclipse, an indie record label rapper from Seattle, Washington.

== Early life ==
Corey was born and raised in Seattle, Washington, where he spent his childhood before moving to Las Vegas, Nevada, at the age of 20. For part of his freshman year of high school, he attended Rainier Beach High School in Seattle, later transferring to nearby Renton High School.

== Career ==
Corey has been involved in several industries, including music, marketing and promotions within the nightlife industry. On February 9, 2012, Davis founded Good Deeds Global Inc., a web-based social business organization. As part of its pay it forward business model, Corey and members of the organization’s team travel to various cities to promote and carry out charitable activities.

During a television interview on KGUN-TV—a local Tucson, Arizona (ABC) affiliate, accompanied by his executive partners, Corey acknowledged the need to encourage good deeds and promote generosity because of so many other negative things going on in the world. He is also the Chief Operations Officer for a Las Vegas based tech-company called snApps Venture Inc.

== Music career ==
Seaclipse released two studio albums on the Dallas, Texas based independent record label Ultrax Records, where he was label-mates with rapper Vanilla Ice, pop-singer Marcos Hernandez, and rock band Blessid Union of Souls. His self-titled debut album was released in early 2005. On July 25, 2006, his second album titled Playin With Fire was released. The album guest featured rappers Bun B, Redman, Gemini, pop-singer Marcos Hernandez, and music producer Jerome Harmon. On November 27, 2007, as a collective group of hip-hop artists, Seaclipse along with rappers Lil' Flip, Gudda Gudda, and others released the joint collaborative compilation album We Got Next. Track number #7 by Seaclipse, a single from the album which is titled I'm Hot, features both Huey (rapper) and Lil' Flip on it.

In an interview with www.24hourhiphop.com, he stated that above any other artist in the history of the music industry, he wished he could have collaborated with fellow Seattle musician Jimi Hendrix if he were still alive. In 2009, Seaclipse released an underground hip-hop single titled Bad Chick which was featured on the popular Coast 2 Coast mixtape series. The song also received more than 128,000 plays on his Myspace band-page. Seaclipse has performed live at a variety of music festivals, showcase-gigs, nightclubs, and concert venues throughout the United States.

== Filmography ==
Year	Title	Role	Notes
2014	La Vida Robot	Event Staff	
2014	Persecuted (film)	News Reporter	
2014	Transcendence (2014 film)	Berkeley Street Guy	
2014	Think Like a Man Too	Pool Guy In Purple	

== Other ventures ==
Using the pseudonym Corey Vegas in July 2011, he started a Las Vegas nightlife promotion service and VIP club hosting venture called Corey Vegas, LLC. Alongside a variety of celebrities, recording artists, and famous DJ's, Corey has hosted many different events at some of Las Vegas most well-known nightclub and day-pool venues. Events such as the official Love King album release party for singer-songwriter The-Dream. Another such occasion took place with hip-hop artist Baby Bash and DJ Qbert at the Foundation Room nightclub located on the roof-top of the Mandalay Bay Resort and Casino.

== Discography ==
=== Studio albums ===
- Seaclipse (2005)
- Playin With Fire (2006)

=== Compilation albums ===
- Dollarz And Cents (2006)
- We Got Next (2007)

=== Mixtapes ===
- Southwest Connection - The Mixtape Series Vol. 20 (2007)
- Coast 2 Coast Mixtape Vol. 92 (2009)

== Accolades ==
In December 2007, Seaclipse was named the Washington State Champion in a Vibe (magazine) feature article titled State Champs: The 51 Best MySpace Rappers in America.
