= Corey Brown =

Cor(e)y or Corrie Brown(e) may also refer to:

- Corey Brown (American football) (born 1991), American football wide receiver
- Corey Brown (baseball) (born 1985), American baseball player
- Corey Brown (jockey) (born 1976), Australian jockey
- Corey Brown (politician) (born 1974), American state senator in South Dakota
- Corey Brown (soccer) (born 1994), Australian footballer (soccer)
- Cory Brown (born 1996), New Zealand footballer
- Corrie Brown (1949–2007), British bobsledder
