= Corey Sanders (disambiguation) =

Corey Sanders (born 1975) is an American professional boxer.

Corey Sanders may also refer to:

- Corey I. Sanders, COO of MGM Resorts International
- Corey Sanders (basketball) (born 1997), American basketball player

== See also ==
- Corrie Sanders (1966–2012), South African professional boxer
