= Corey Harris (disambiguation) =

Corey Harris may refer to:

- Corey Harris (born 1969), American musician
- Corey Harris (American football, born 1969), American football player
- Corey Harris (American football, born 1976), American football player
