= Corey Hilliard =

American football player (born 1985)

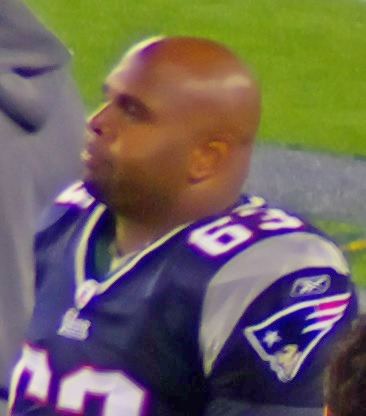
- Hilliard with the New England Patriots in 2007

No. 63, 72, 78
- Position: Offensive tackle

Personal information
- Born: April 26, 1985 (age 41); New Orleans, Louisiana, U.S.
- Listed height: 6 ft 5 in (1.96 m)
- Listed weight: 308 lb (140 kg)

Career information
- High school: Jesuit (New Orleans)
- College: Oklahoma State
- NFL draft: 2007: 6th round, 209th overall pick

Career history
- New England Patriots (2007)*; Indianapolis Colts (2007–2008); Cleveland Browns (2009)*; Detroit Lions (2009–2014); New York Jets (2015)*
- * Offseason or practice squad member only

Awards and highlights
- First-team All-Big 12 (2006); Second-team All-Big 12 (2005)

Career NFL statistics
- Games played: 47
- Games started: 12
- Stats at Pro Football Reference

Corey Hilliard (born April 26, 1985) is an American former professional football player who was an offensive tackle for seven seasons in the National Football League (NFL). He played college football for the Oklahoma State Cowboys, before being selected by the New England Patriots in the sixth round of the 2007 NFL draft. Hilliard was also a member of the Indianapolis Colts, Cleveland Browns, Detroit Lions, and New York Jets.

== Professional career ==
Pre-draft measurables
Height	Weight	Arm length	Hand span	40-yard dash	10-yard split	20-yard split	20-yard shuttle	Three-cone drill	Vertical jump	Broad jump	Bench press
6 ft 5 1/4 in (1.96 m)	308 lb (140 kg)	34 7/8 in (0.89 m)	10 1/2 in (0.27 m)	5.38 s	1.86 s	3.09 s	4.65 s	7.45 s	29.0 in (0.74 m)	8 ft 10 in (2.69 m)	28 reps

=== New England Patriots ===
Hilliard was selected in the sixth round of the 2007 NFL draft to the New England Patriots. However, on September 1, he was cut from the team.

=== Indianapolis Colts ===
In the 2007 NFL season, Hilliard made 3 appearances for the Colts, and in the 2008 NFL season, Hilliard made 2 appearances.

=== Cleveland Browns ===
For the 2009 NFL season, Hilliard left the Colts, and joined the Cleveland Browns.

=== Detroit Lions ===
On December 10, 2009, Hilliard joined the Detroit Lions. Despite not playing a game for the Lions, Hilliard was resigned as an exclusive free agent for the 2010 NFL season.

Hilliard played all 16 regular season games for the Lions in 2010 and 2011, and also played in their post-season wild card round defeat to the New Orleans Saints (as of March 2015, this is Hilliard's only postseason appearance).

Hilliard did not play in the 2012 NFL season, but on March 1, 2013, Hilliard signed a 2-year contract extension with the Lions. Hilliard played 9 games during the 2013 NFL season.

In the Lion's opening game of the 2014 NFL season against the New York Giants, Hilliard suffered a Lisfranc injury his right foot, ruling him out of the rest of the 2014 season. He was placed on the Injured reserve list.

=== New York Jets ===
Hilliard was signed by the New York Jets on March 24, 2015. He announced his retirement from football on May 8, 2015.
