= Fitzsimons =

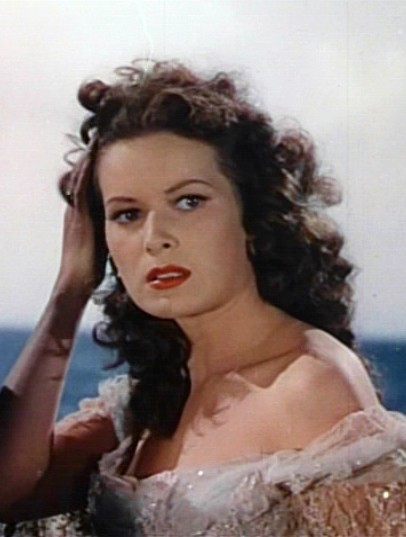
- Maureen O'Hara (real family name FitzSimons) in the trailer for The Black Swan
- Pronunciation: \FIT- simmons\

Origin
- Region of origin: Ireland, England

Other names
- Variant forms: Fitzsimmons, FitzSimons, FitzSimmons

Fitzsimons (also spelled FitzSimons, Fitzsimmons or FitzSimmons) is a surname of Norman origin common in both Ireland and England. The name is a variant of "Sigmundsson", meaning son of Sigmund. The Gaelicisation of this surname is Mac Síomóin or Mac an Ridire.

The name "FitzSymons" and its pre-standardization variants (Fitzsimons, Fitzsimmons, Fitz-Simons, etc.) is not a sept, or clan, name, but rather an individual patronymic passed down through various, yet discrete, colonial families arriving at different times in Irish history. Some families "went native" during the Gaelic revival of the 14th and 15th centuries, and many refused to endorse the Protestant Reformation. Others became important members of the Protestant Ascendancy and its supporting mittelstand. Two distinct families can be identified: those who arrived when the surname was first recorded in Ireland in 1177, attached to an adventurer seeking swordlands in Ulster, known as Sir John de Courcy of Carrickfergus Castle, earl of Ulster. These Fitzsimons are now native to the east-central seaboard of Ulster, in Lecale, Ards and Down.

In 1323, a junior member of the Fitzsymons' of Simonshide, Herefordshire, settled in Dublin. This family is thought to be distinct from the Ulster Fitzsimons. Settling in Dublin, and the north and south reaches of Dublin County, they expanded into Meath, Westmeath, King's and Queen's County of the central English Pale. This branch may have been the root of the Wexford Fitzsimons family which produced a Signer of the Declaration of Independence (or the Wexford family may have sprung from a Norman adventurer arriving with Strongbow). Of the Pale Fitzsimons, it is thought discrete branches settled at Tullynally, County Meath, the line of Sir William Johnson and 'went' native by intermarrying with the O'Reillys and MacMahons of south central Ulster. These are generally the families now with ties to County Cavan and County Longford.

The English family which sent its youngest son to Dublin in 1323 died out in the name, only the Irish branch now survives. The name "Fitzsimons" is quite common in England itself. These originating in Norfolk, Lincolnshire and Nottinghamshire are thought to be Scandinavian and of the genere Danus, as the area was settled by Danish Vikings and predate the Norman invasion in 1066 AD.

== People surnamed Fitzsimons or Fitzsimmons ==
- Allan Fitzsimmons (f. 1980s–2000s), United States civil servant
- Arthur Fitzsimons (1929–2018), Irish athlete in football
- Casey FitzSimmons (born 1980), United States athlete in football
- Charles Fitzsimmons (1802–1876), Australian politician and sugar farmer, Member of the Queensland Legislative Assembly (1860–1861, 1865–1868)
- Charles B. Fitzsimons (1924–2001), Irish American actor
- Conor Fitzsimmons (born 1998), British rugby league footballer
- Lowell "Cotton" Fitzsimmons (1931–2004), United States basketball coach
- Cortland Fitzsimmons (1893–1949), American writer, screenwriter, and author of crime fiction
- David Fitzsimons (1950–2008), Australian Olympic athlete
- David Fitzsimons (born 1991), Irish chess player
- David Fitzsimmons (1875–?), Scottish athlete in football
- David FitzSimmons (born 1978), American politician, member of the Minnesota House of Representatives (2013–2015)
- Eoghan Fitzsimons, Irish Attorney General (1994) and barrister
- Foster Fitzsimmons (f. 1930s–1960s), United States dancer, novelist and teacher
- Frank Fitzsimmons (1907–1981), United States labor leader
- Freddie Fitzsimmons (1901–1979), United States athlete in baseball
- Frederick William FitzSimons (1870–1951), South African naturalist
- George Fitzsimmons (public servant) (1858–1933), Australian letter server
- George Fitzsimmons (serial killer) (1937–1999), American serial killer
- George Kinzie Fitzsimons (1928–2013), American Roman Catholic bishop
- Gerry Fitzsimons (1960–2007), British businessman
- Greg Fitzsimmons (born 1966), United States comedian and writer
- Herbert FitzSimons (1898–1970), Australian politician, Member of the New South Wales Legislative Assembly (1930–1944) and Council (1955–1970)
- James E. Fitzsimmons (1874–1966), United States racehorse trainer
- Jason Fitzsimmons (born 1971), Canadian athlete in ice hockey
- Jeanette Fitzsimons (1945–2020), New Zealand politician and environmentalist
- James Fitzsimmons (1870–1948), Canadian politician, member of the Legislative Assembly of British Columbia (1928–1933)
- Jim Fitzsimons (born 1936), Irish politician
- John Fitzsimons (footballer) (1915–1995), Scottish footballer for Alloa, Falkirk and Clyde, doctor with Celtic
- John FitzSimons (born 1943), English javelin thrower
- John Fitzsimmons (1939–2008), Scottish clergyman and broadcaster
- Kirsten Fitzsimmons (1995), American music teacher, organist, and artist in Baltimore
- Lesley Fitz-Simons (1961–2013), Scottish actress
- Lorna Fitzsimons (born 1967), British politician
- Matthew Fitzsimmons (1913-?), English football centre half who played for Liverpool
- Maureen O'Hara (born Maureen FitzSimons; 1920–2015), Irish-American actress
- Maurice J. Fitzsimons, Jr. (1906–1972), American politician
- Michael Fitzsimons (born 1989), Irish Gaelic footballer who plays for Cuala and Dublin
- Orla Fitzsimons (born 1981), Irish rugby union player
- Pat Fitzsimons (born 1950), United States athlete in golf
- Paul Fitzsimons, Irish Gaelic footballer
- Peter FitzSimons (born 1961), Australian rugby union player, journalist, author
- Randy Fitzsimmons (f. 1990s), Swedish musician
- Richard W. Fitzsimons (1922–1991), American farmer and politician
- Riley Fitzsimmons (born 1996), Australian Olympic sprint canoeist
- Robert Fitzsimmons, several people:
  - Robert James "Bob" Fitzsimmons (1863–1918), British boxer and three division champion
  - Robert Stanley "Bob" Fitzsimmons (1917–1998), Australian rules footballer who played for Fitzroy and St Kilda
  - Robert J. "Rocky" Fitzsimmons (born 1979), American attorney and politician, member of the West Virginia Senate (2012–014)
- Ronald J. Fitzsimmons (f. 1980s–2000s), United States lobbyist
- Ross Fitzsimons (born 1994), English footballer
- Roy Fitzsimmons (1916–1945), United States explorer
- Shane Fitzsimmons (f. 2000s), Australian fire commissioner
- Shane Fitzsimmons (footballer) (born 1955), Australian rules footballer who played for Melbourne and for West Perth
- Sharyn Hill (née Fitzsimmons; born 1954), Australian cricket player
- Stephen Fitzsimons (1882–1952), Irish Gaelic footballer
- Steve Fitzsimmons (born 1976), Australian athlete in football
- Stuart Fitzsimmons (1956–2019), British Olympic alpine skier
- Thomas Fitzsimons (1741–1811), American merchant and statesman. Signed U.S. Constitution.
- Tom Fitzsimmons (baseball) (1890–1971), United States athlete in baseball
- Tom Fitzsimmons (actor) (born 1947), American television actor
- Tommy Fitzsimmons (1870–?), Scottish athlete in football
- Vivian Frederick Maynard FitzSimons (1901–1975), South African herpetologist
- Whitney Fitzsimmons, Australian journalist
- William Fitzsimmons (disambiguation), any of several men with variations of that name

== Places with the name ==
- Fitzsimmons Creek, a large creek in Whistler, British Columbia, Canada
- Fitzsimmons Range, a mountain range in southwestern British Columbia, Canada
- FitzSimons Wood, a forest in Dún Laoghaire–Rathdown, County Dublin, Ireland
- The Young Men's Leadership School at Thomas FitzSimons High School
- Fitzsimons Army Medical Center, was a U.S. Army facility located in Aurora, Colorado

== Fictional characters ==
- Jimmy Fitzsimmons, character in the American animated series F Is for Family
- "Fitzsimmons", the "ship" name for the fictional characters Leo Fitz and Jemma Simmons in the series Agents of S.H.I.E.L.D.
