= East Breifne =

Historic kingdom of Ireland

Coordinates: 53°55′N 7°15′W

Kingdom of East Breifne Bréifne Uí Raghallaigh
- 1256–1607
- Banner of arms Coat of arms
- Motto: Fortitudine et prudentia (English: With fortitude and prudence)
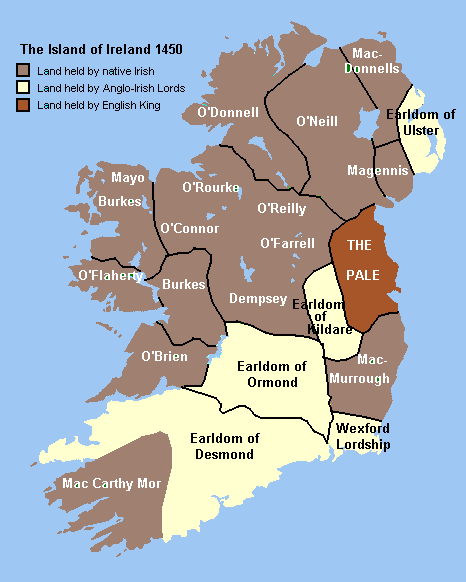
- A map of 1450 Ireland shows Breifne O'Reilly
- Capital: Belturbet (1256 to late 13th century); Cavan (c. 1300)
- Common languages: Irish; English (Note: Irish would have been spoken by the vast majority of the population and used as the day-to-day language of the kings and nobility as well; however, the O'Reilly kings and many Brefnian nobles were evidently able to write fluently in English as far back as the late 15th century. The implementation of English law in the 16th century probably expanded its use even further.)
- Religion: Roman Catholic
- Government: Elective monarchy
- King
  - 1256–1257: Conchobar Uí Raghallaigh
  - 1603–1607: Maolmhordha O'Reilly
- History
  - Split from Breifne: 1256
  - Shired: 1579
  - Disestablished: 1607
Preceded by	Succeeded by
Bréifne	Kingdom of Ireland
- Today part of: Ireland

The Kingdom of East Breifne or Breifne O'Reilly (Old Irish: Muintir-Maelmordha; Irish: Bréifne Uí Raghallaigh, IPA: [ˈbʲɾʲeːfʲnʲə iː ˈɾˠəil̪ˠiː]) was an historic kingdom of Ireland roughly corresponding to County Cavan that existed from 1256 to 1607. It took its present boundaries in 1579 when East Breifne was renamed Cavan, after Cavan town, and shired into Ulster.

Originally part of the older Kingdom of Breifne, East Breifne emerged following a protracted war between the ruling O'Rourke clan and the ascendant O'Reillys, culminating in the kingdom's division in 1256. The Kingdom was ruled by the Ó Raghallaigh (O'Reilly) dynasty and lasted until the early 17th century.

== Origins and etymology ==
The area of modern-day east County Cavan has been inhabited for over 5,000 years. The O'Reilly are descendant from a kin-group known as Uí Briúin, who settled the east Breifne area in the eighth century AD. At some point they splintered off from the Uí Briúin sept and became known as Muintir-Maelmordha, named after their chief Maelmordha who lived in the 9th century. They did not assume a surname until the early 11th century when they became known as O Raghallaigh, from the chieftain Raghallach. They are believed to have arrived in what is now County Cavan in the 10th century. Muintir-Maelmordha first appear in the Irish annals as a clan ruling a small territory around Lough Ramor called Machaire Gailenga in 1126, at which point they are a vassal of the O'Rourkes.

== Kingdom of Breifne c. 1120–1256 ==
Machaire Gailenga was annexed after the O'Reilly were defeated by the O'Rourkes and became a constituent clan within what was then known as the Kingdom of Bréifne and Conmaicne. King Tigernán Mór Ua Ruairc, who reigned from 1124 to 1172, was conquering eastward and it was under Tighernán Mór that the Kingdom of Breifne reached its greatest expanse, extending from Hill of Ward and Kells, County Meath to Drumcliff, County Sligo in the late 12th century. Tighernán Mór consolidated the eastern territories he had conquered through his marriage to Derbforgaill, daughter of the King of Meath.

There was great animosity between the subjugated O'Reillys and their O'Rourke overlords. Tighernán Mór went to war with King Diarmait Mac Murchada of Leinster in 1152 following Mac Murchada's abduction of Queen Derbforgaill, and his claim over land that was in Brefnian possession. Taking advantage of Breifne's preoccupation, chief Geofraidh O'Reilly launched an unsuccessful rebellion in 1154 and was banished from the kingdom following his defeat. In 1155 when Donnchad Ua Cerbaill king of Airgíalla was captured and imprisoned by Tighernán Mór, Geofraidh O'Reilly and his supporters ambushed the Brefnian guards and rescued Ua Cerbaill. O'Reilly was later captured and executed for this act of sedition.

=== Norman invasion ===
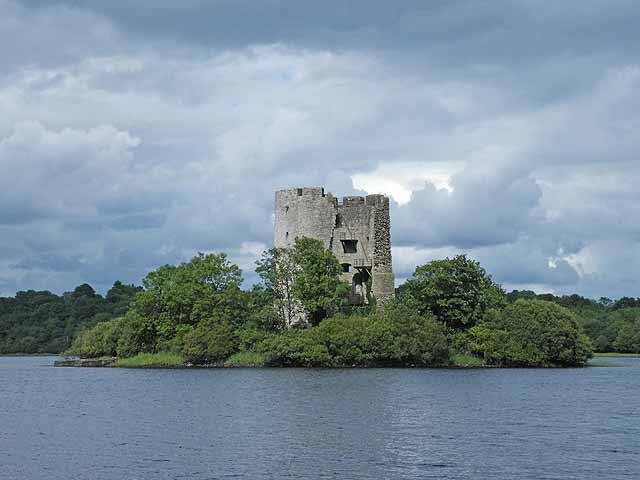
The initially Norman Cloughoughter Castle was captured & completed by the O'Reillys in 1233

Tighernán Mór formed a coalition with the High King, Ruaidrí Ua Conchobair, which ousted Mac Murchada in 1166. Mac Murchada fled to England and sought help from Henry II to aid him in reconquering his kingdom. This prompted the Norman invasion of Ireland in 1169. With Norman aid Mac Murchada retook Leinster, and set Kells, Breifne's easternmost outpost, ablaze. In 1170 Breifne was invaded and in the following years the kingdom was carved up by the Normans. O'Rourke power was weakened whilst the O'Reilly submitted to Mac Murchada and his Norman allies during the conquest.

Shortly after Mac Murchada's death in May 1171, most of the native Irish kingdoms waged war on his successor, Richard de Clare or "Strongbow". However, the O'Reilly allied themselves with the Normans as a way of breaking free of the O'Rourke. The division between the two clans is most apparent during the Siege of Dublin, when the O'Rourke king is encamped outside the city with his Gaelic allies, and the O'Reilly king is inside aligned with Strongbow and his council.

During parley in 1172 at Trim, Tighernán Mór was betrayed and killed by Hugh de Lacy, Lord of Meath, throwing the O'Rourke dynasty into chaos. The instability and wars of succession between the various branches of the O'Rourke sept weakened their hold over the territory of Breifne even further. With the help of de Lacy, the O'Rourkes were driven back and expelled from O'Reilly land. Good relations between the O'Reilly and the Normans persisted until the early 13th century when they were soured by Hugh's two sons, Walter and William Gorm.

The influence of the Normans in eastern Breifne was considerable and by 1211 they had established castles in Belturbet and Kilmore. King John of England took possession of the Lordship of Meath from the de Lacy family following Hugh's death, but it was returned to Hugh's son Walter de Lacy in 1215. Walter, William Gorm, and their Anglo-Norman forces began expanding into Breifne in an attempt to increase their influence to western Ulster. By 1220 de Lacy had taken control of most of the O'Reilly territory, including the stony island at Lough Oughter, where William Gorm began construction of a castle. Cathal O'Connor, King of Connacht, wrote to Henry III in 1224 informing him that the de Lacy family had not only seized Breifne from the O'Rourkes, but the Earldom of Ulster as well. Seeing that Walter had clearly overstepped his boundaries, Henry III sent an English force led by William Marshal to Ireland to put down de Lacy. The O'Reillys assisted Marshal in his campaign against de Lacy and, following a short siege, retook the castle at Lough Oughter, which they finished in 1233.

During Marshal's punitive war in Ireland, chief Cathal O'Reilly, great-grandson of Geofraidh, exploited the power vacuum left by de Lacy to secure control of Breifne from his enemies. In 1226 he captured and demolished de Lacy's castle at Kilmore and raided into western Breifne, killing the O'Rourke king's son Aodh at Lough Allen. Cathal had set into motion the events which over the following 30 years would culminate in the dissolution of Breifne.

=== O'Reilly Rule 1230–1250 ===
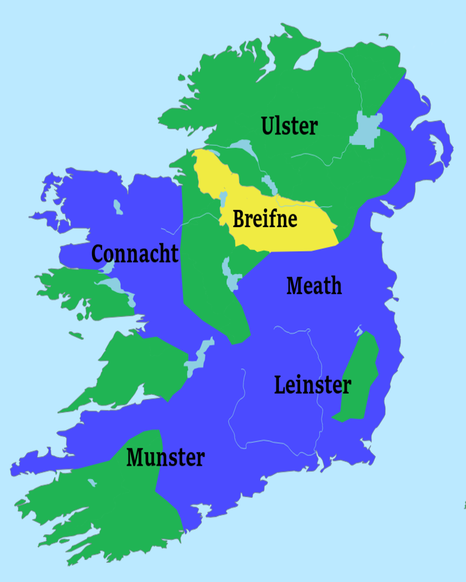
Ireland in 1250 showing Gaelic areas (green) and Norman areas (blue). Breifne is shown in yellow.

For his assistance in the campaign against de Lacy, Henry III issued a royal grant to the King of Connacht giving him overlordship of Breifne, a position which he delegated to his son Aedh. Naturally, this position was challenged by the O'Rourkes, who themselves were overlords of Breifne. Keen to usurp the power of the O'Rourkes, Aedh entered into an alliance with their most intractable enemy, the O'Reillys. The O'Rourkes now had the O'Reillys attacking from the east and Connacht attacking from the west.

Evidently alarmed by the prospect of a "lesser clan" rising up and seizing control of the kingdom, Domnhall O'Donnell, King of Tyrconnell, sailed south across Lough Erne and into Lough Oughter, where he destroyed Cathal O'Reilly's home, abducting his wife Cacht, and killing his favourite horse. Cathal survived and was able to put the traumatic event behind him, even agreeing a peace with Tyrconnell shortly afterwards.

With Connacht's help, the O'Reillys had usurped control of Breifne by the early 1230s. Cathal O'Reilly ruled as king from the east of the kingdom and Cúchonnacht O'Reilly, Connacht's foremost general and close ally of King Felim O'Conor, had militarily taken control of western Breifne and expelled the O'Rourke leaders. In 1233 William Gorm de Lacy, having received a royal pardon for his overseas service, attempted to retake Breifne with a large force of English and Anglo-Irish soldiers. He was decisively defeated by Cathal and Cúchonnacht at Moin Crandchain near the Meath border, and died from his wounds.

Following the battle, eastern Breifne emerged relatively stable, but Cúchonnacht is mentioned numerous times in the annals suppressing what was effectively a guerilla warfare campaign against his usurpation of their rule by various O'Rourke nobles in western Breifne. In 1237 Richard Mór de Burgh ousted Felim O'Conor who turned to Cúchonnacht for aid. Cúchonnacht was able to raise an army from the men of western Breifne, illustrating that his grip on that half of the kingdom was relatively strong by this point. Cúchonnacht and Felim had remarkable success against the Anglo-Norman forces despite the latter's superior technology, such as chain armour.

However, by 1239 and throughout the 1240s, the O'Reilly came into conflict with O'Conor. The king of Connacht was severely diminished and ruled only the area of modern-day County Roscommon, most of the province had fallen to de Burgh. The O'Reilly were now the most powerful players in the region and Cúchonnacht attempted to cement his dominance. Given his actions, Cúchonnacht was perhaps more powerful than Cathal at this point, despite the former holding no official office or title. The conflict between the two kingdoms came to a head when the battered O'Conor sept attempted to reassert the primacy it once had over Breifne.

In response to O'Conor's actions, the chiefs of the lesser clans of the area such as those at Moylurg and Muintir Eolais, traditionally vassals of the O'Conors and the O'Rourkes, were removed and replaced with puppet leaders by Cúchonnacht. He effectively ruled by decree and garnered a reputation as a tyrant. One such instance that provoked outrage across the province was an unscrupulous deal in 1242 in which Cúchonnacht supported the claim of Tadhg O'Conor, a rival claimant to Felim, on the condition that he, as king of Connacht, renounce all claims to Breifne. By the Autumn of 1242, when it had become apparent that Tadhg had garnered little support for his claim and was no longer of any use to Cúchonnacht, he was seized and imprisoned. In the spring of 1243, Cúchonnacht ordered the young prince to be blinded and castrated. This drove Felim to throw more support behind the O'Rourkes and their claim to Breifne.

=== Secession of East Breifne ===
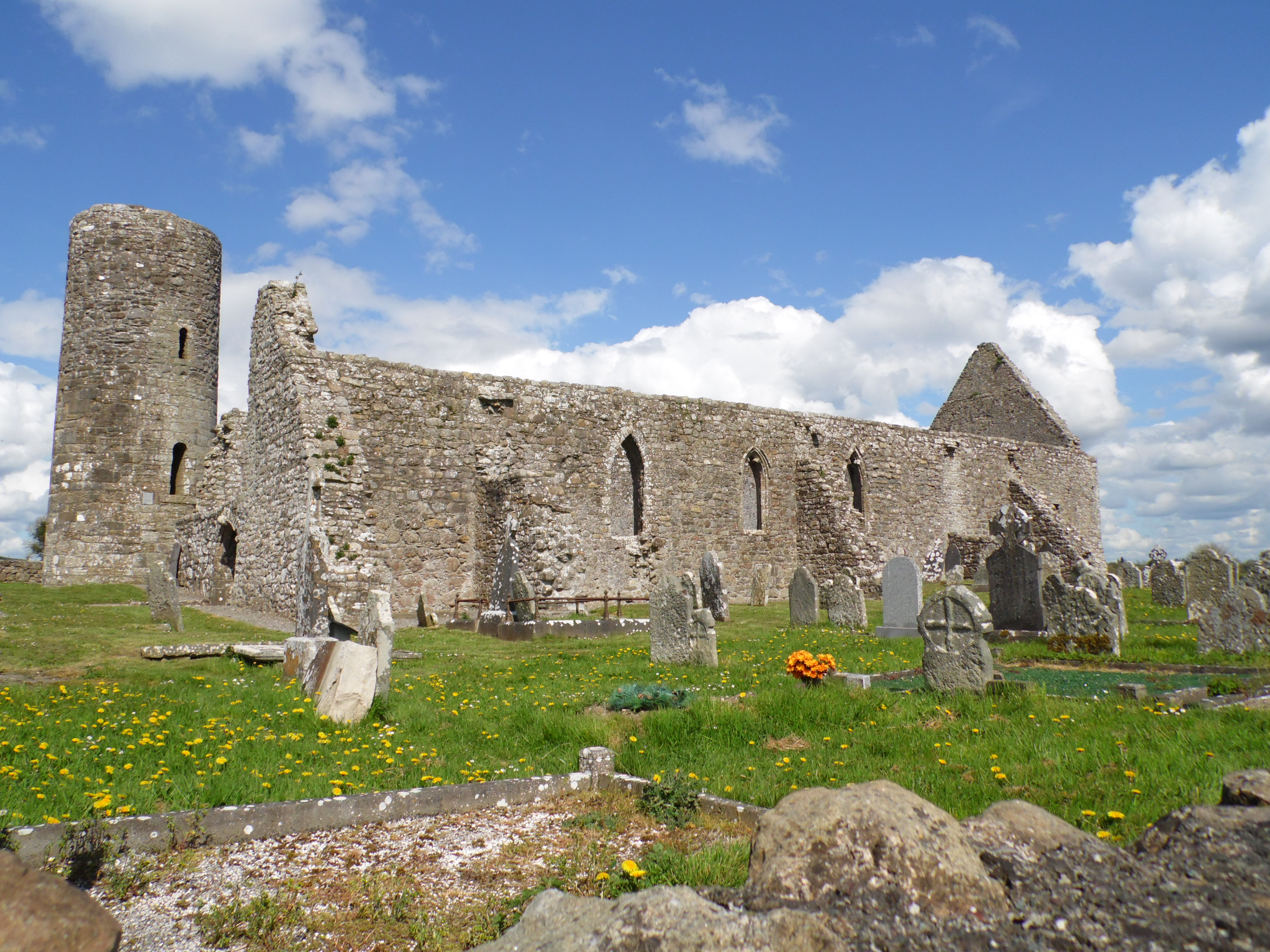
Drumlane Abbey was razed by the O'Rourkes in 1261. Sporadic fighting along the border continued long after the breakup.

The 1240s saw widespread conflict between the native Irish and the Normans, who were at this stage engaged in near constant war. De Burgh's advance forced Felim O'Conor to flee to Tyrconnell in 1249. There he met with King Brian Ua Néill of Tyrone and the deposed Conchobar O'Rourke of Breifne, and they formed a coalition against the Normans and their allies. While the O'Reilly joined Maurice FitzGerald, Justiciar of Ireland in his abortive march into Ulster, Ua Néill marched south and restored Felim O'Conor to his throne in Connacht.

From 1250 onwards western Breifne was wrested back from Cúchonnacht. In 1255 Breifne was raided three times by Ua Néill, and was invaded from the west by O'Conor and O'Rourke. Connacht declared Conchobar O'Rourke as King of Breifne, and gave Conchobar O'Reilly, Cathal's discontented son, the lesser position of Taoiseach. Cúchonnacht and his forces had been pushed out of the west. In 1256 Walter de Burgh raided into Connacht to devastate the country and relieve pressure on the O'Reillys who further north had ventured into western Breifne to retake control of the territory.

The two armies were meant to rendezvous at Lough Allen but the O'Reillys came under heavy attack and were forced to retreat. They were pursued northwards to Magh Slécht, where the Battle of Magh Slecht ensued. The O'Reilly and the O'Rourke suffered heavy losses, both Cúchonnacht and Cathal were slain in the battle, as were 14 other O'Reilly nobles. Connacht and the O'Rourke emerged victorious and O'Reilly power was shattered.

Relations between the O'Conor and the O'Reilly were extremely hostile and, following his victory at Magh Slecht, Aodh O'Conor, Prince of Connacht, was determined to continue to conquer into the east and bring all of Breifne under Connacht's control. This was briefly achieved following the inauguration of Conchobar O'Reilly, Aodh's ally, as head of the O'Reilly clan. However Conchobar died the following year and was succeeded by Matha O'Reilly, who immediately broke ties with Connacht.

Aodh's goal of re-establishing control of the east was never realized as political chaos, largely of Aodh's making, erupted amongst the newly restored O'Rourke dynasty, which went on to have 7 kings in 3 years (1257-1260). Any potential invasion of eastern Breifne was made even more unlikely when the O'Conors and the O'Rourkes went to war in 1257. Rivals at home and conflict in West Breifne occupied much of Aodh's time for the next decade or so. When he died in 1274 his successor had no interest in pursuing conflict with the O'Reilly. Thus, the division remained permanent. Despite a nominal claim by the O'Rourkes to the kingship of "all of Breifne", the kingdom had split into West Breifne and East Breifne.

== East Breifne 1256–1607 ==
With the exception of a failed invasion by Aodh O'Conor in 1261, the early years of East Breifne were relatively uneventful. In contrast to the tumultuous decades of Cathal and Cúchonnacht, the kingdom exerted very little influence outside of its own borders. Following two combined attacks on his residence by the McKiernans of Teallach Dúnchadha and the MacGaurans of Teallach Eochaid in the late 13th century, King Ferghal moved eastwards to Tullymongan Hill, where he built a castle. This remained the residence of the O'Reilly king until the 17th century.

=== 14th Century ===
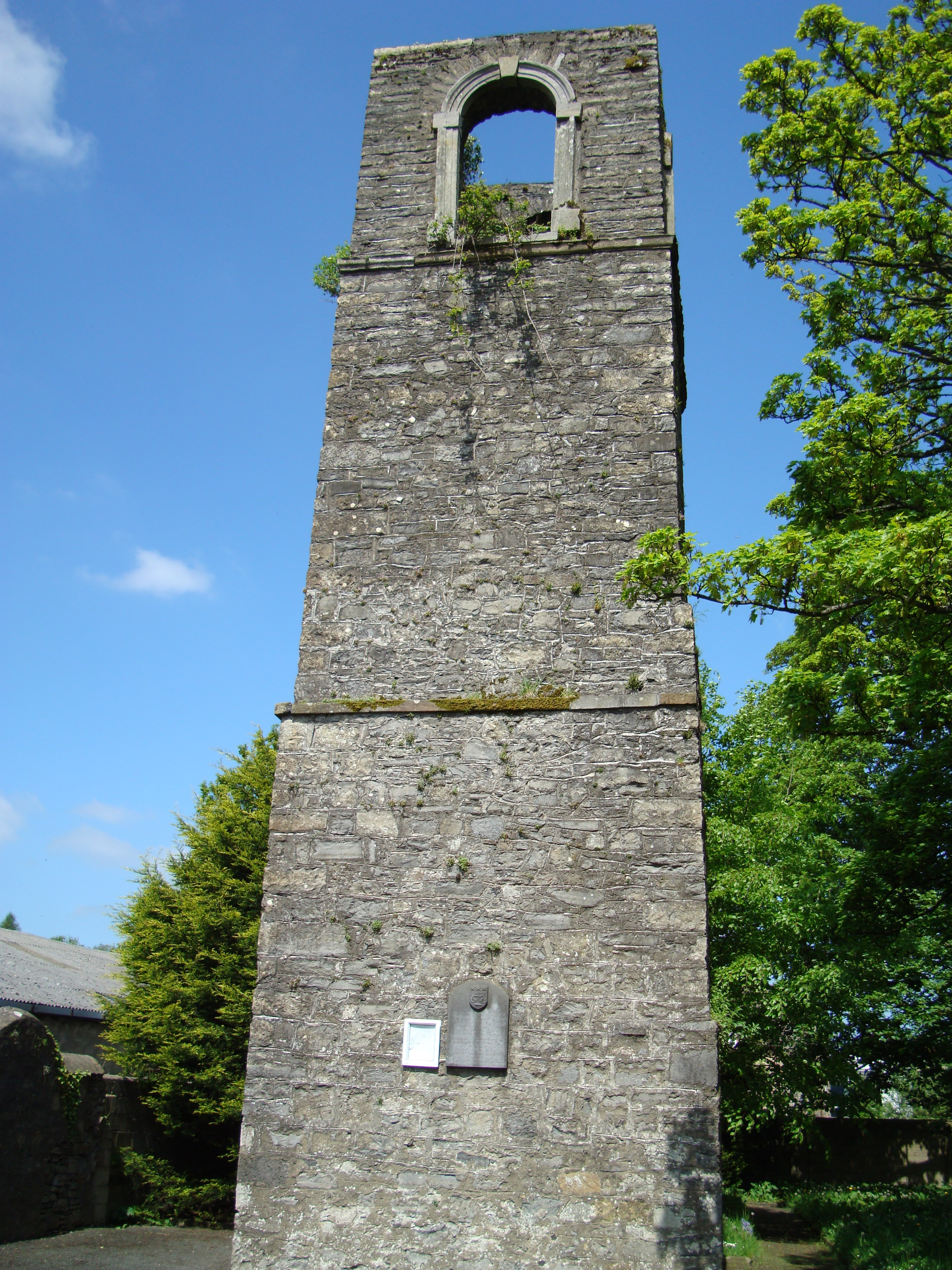
King Giolla Iosa Ruaidh established the town of Cavan and its Franciscan friary in the early 14th century

Under his successor, Giolla Iosa Ruaidh, a town grew around the site and came to be known as "an Cabhán", in reference to its topography as a hollow area between many drumlins. He also founded the Franciscan friary where he retired to around the year 1327. The eldest of his 13 sons, Maelseachleann, died in 1328 and was listed as king in his obituary. Giolla Iosa Ruaidh remained in retirement and his second son Risdeard assumed kingship. Decades of succession stability followed, when Risdeard died his brother Cu Chonnacht became king. Cu Chonnacht retired in 1365 and passed the title to his brother Pilib.

Upon his accession, Pilib confronted the Bishop of Kilmore Riocard O'Reilly, his brother Maelseachleann's son. Complaints had been made to the archbishop about Riocard's behavior, which included harsh treatment of clergy and a relationship with his first cousin. Pilib took matters into his own hands and seized the bishop's lands and revenue. Although the archbishop was against Pilib's intrusions, he was far removed in Armagh and powerless to stop them.

Pilib was briefly overthrown in 1369 and imprisoned at Cloughoughter castle by his nephew Maghnus, with the support of the Clan Muircheartaigh and the McKiernans. The Maguires, who Pilib was allied with through marriage, along with the MacMahons, sailed south on the Erne and freed him. Maghnus and his plotters were then imprisoned in that same castle.

14th century East Breifne also saw the arrival of prominent Anglo-Norman families such as Lynch and Fitzsimons, as well as the Hiberno-Scottish mercenary clan MacCabe, who became gallowglass warriors for the Maguires, MacMahons and O'Reillys. The Fitzsimons were an English merchant family that settled in County Meath. Following a dispute with his family, one Richard FitzSimon journeyed to the Gaelic territory to seek the patronage of King Tomas Mór, who granted him lands in return for his services as a Secretan, a role that primarily consisted of letter writing due to FitzSimon's literary proficiency.

Tomas Mór provided refuge and support to rivals of King Tiernan Mór O'Rourke of West Breifne in the late 1370s and 1380s, prompting O'Rourke to invade East Breifne in 1390. Curiously, the Clan Muircheartaigh, who had been expelled from Breifne twenty years earlier through a combined offensive by both Tadhg na gCoar O'Rourke of West Breifne and Pilib O'Reilly of East Breifne, decided to fight alongside the O'Reillys against the O'Rourkes. Tiernan Mor raided deep into East Breifne but was defeated when his forces became bogged down and surrounded in early 1391, forcing him to surrender. On his way to Drumlane to submit to Tomas Mór, the Clan Muircheartaigh attempted to assassinate Tiernan Mór, possibly in an unsuccessful attempt to curry favour with the O’Reillys and return from exile.

Seoan O'Reilly was made king in 1392. In autumn of 1394 Richard II of England arrived in Ireland with a force of 8,000 at the behest of the Anglo-Irish lords in and around the Pale, who were in danger of being overrun by the Irish clans of Leinster. The invasion proved to be one of Richard II's few successes and many Irish chieftains submitted to the English king. A future king of East Breifne, Sean's brother Giolla Iosa, met with Richard and promised to remain a faithful subject and refrain from attacking England's other subjects in Ireland. King Seoan himself did not submit to the English king but made a separate agreement with Roger Mortimer, Earl of March and Ulster, to improve relations.

=== 15th century ===
Following Seoan's death in 1400, his brother and chosen successor Giolla Iosa died just one month into his reign. Giolla Iosa's unexpected death so shortly after his inauguration left a power vacuum which Maelmordha, son of King Cu Chonnacht (1349-1365), exploited to proclaim himself king with the support of the clans of East Breifne. This was in competition to Eoghan na Feosaige, Seoan's son, who was supported by the English government in Dublin and the Anglo-Normans in Meath. Eoghan na Feosaige reaffirmed his acknowledgement that he and his kingdom were lieges to England and vowed to observe and fulfill all agreements made between them and his late father. This ploy to get the English to support his claim alienated him from his kinsmen.

The English invaded the territory in an attempt to install Eoghan na Feosaige as king but were repelled, as were the O’Rourkes of West Breifne who simultaneously attacked the east in order to capitalize on the situation. In 1403 the victorious Maelmordha was made king and ordered the assassination of one of Tighernan Mór O’Rourke's sons in retaliation for their opportunistic invasion. Eoghan na Feosaige was also banished from the kingdom that year.

The O’Reilly sept and their allies continued to exclude Eoghan na Fesoagie from the kingship and elected Risdeard, son of King Tomas (1384-1392), as king following Mealmordha's death in 1411. After seven relatively uneventful years as king, Risdeard drowned along with his son and several others while sailing on Lough Sheelin, only his wife Finnuala survived and swam to safety. With few suitable heirs available the O'Reilly nobles recalled Eoghan na Feosaige, who finally assumed the kingship in 1418.

==== Clan Mahon Rebellion 1427–1430 ====
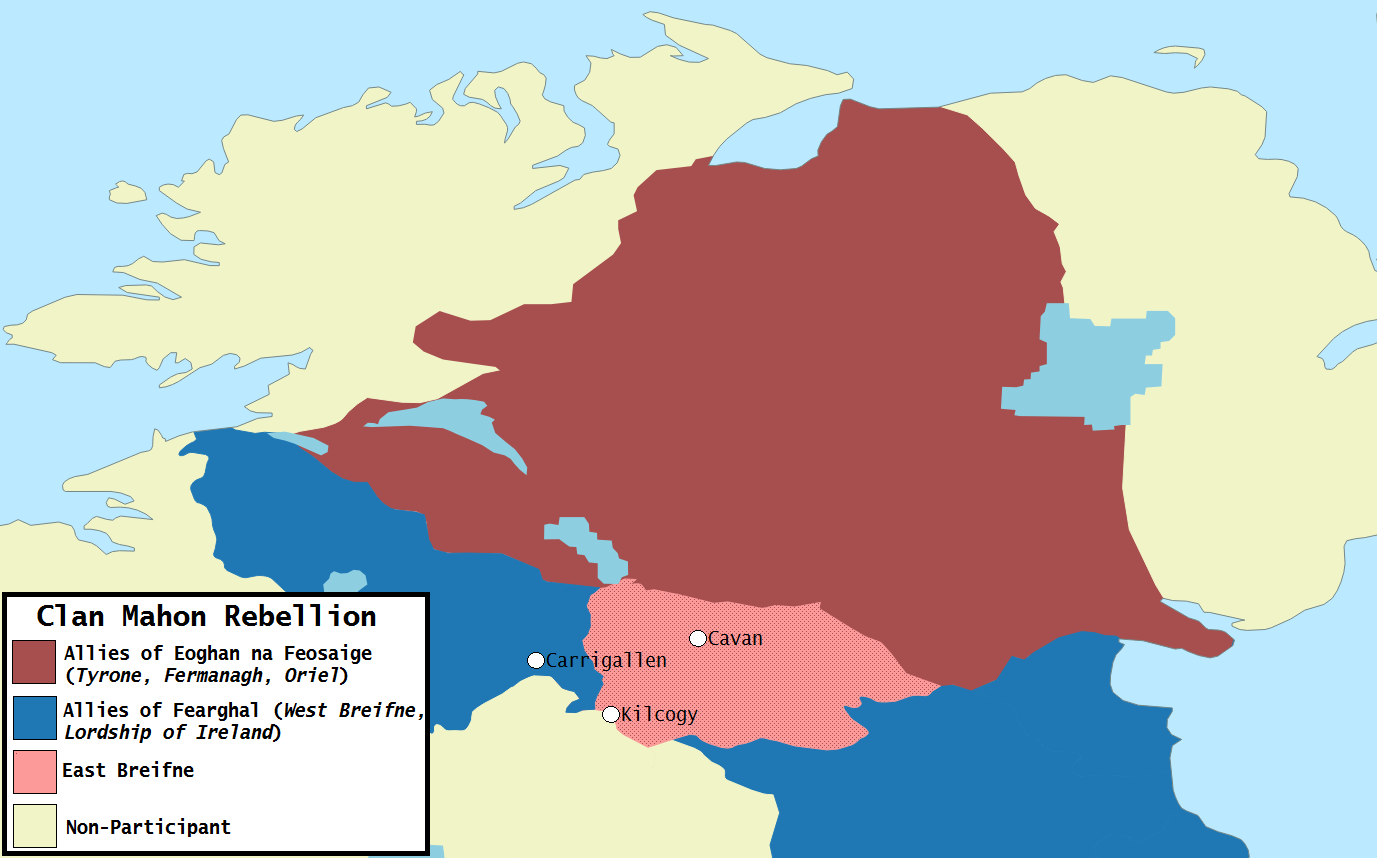
The conflict turned decisively in Eoghan na Feosaige's favour following Tyrone's entry in late 1429.

Eoghan na Feosaige's inauguration coincided with a war of succession that broke out in neighboring West Breifne where one of the O’Rourke claimants, Tadhg, had provocatively declared himself "king of all Breifne" In response to this claim, Eoghan weighed in on the politics of the west and backed the claim of his rival Art O’Rourke, who reigned from the territory of Carrigallen on the border with East Breifne. Eoghan stationed soldiers in Carrigallen to defend and support Art in 1419. However, like the O’Rourkes, the O’Reilly were also a deeply divided sept and a war of succession was about to unfold in East Breifne itself, forcing Eoghan to withdraw his soldiers just months later.

The war's origins can be traced back to a disagreement between Sean and Fearghal O’Reilly. Both men were sons of King Tomas Mór (1385-1392) and were the chiefs of a branch of the O’Reilly sept known as Clan Mahon. Sean and his allies supported Eoghan na Feosaige as king, while Fearghal and his supporters argued that Fearghal was the rightful ruler of East Breifne. Fearghal continued to push his claim and garner support for a number of years. He eventually killed his brother Sean to solidify his position as the chief of Clan Mahon before launching a full-scale rebellion against Eoghan na Feosaige in 1427.

Fearghal had assembled a seemingly insurmountable force that included the MacCabes, a military clan from within East Breifne, King Tadhg O’Rourke of West Breifne, who had emerged victorious from the war of succession, as well as Richard Talbot the Lord Chancellor of Ireland. With a hostile O'Rourke in the west and Talbot marching up from the south, Eoghan found himself not only fighting rebellion internally, but on two separate fronts as well. Eoghan's forces were thoroughly routed by the rebels, who almost achieved victory in 1429 when Fearghal and Talbot captured and razed Cavan town. In what would become a watershed moment in East Breifne's history that would see it firmly align itself with Ulster and drift away from the sphere of Connacht, Eoghan na Feosaige departed the kingdom that year and turned out of desperation to Eoghan O’Neill, King of Tyrone, for help.

==== Alliance with Tyrone ====
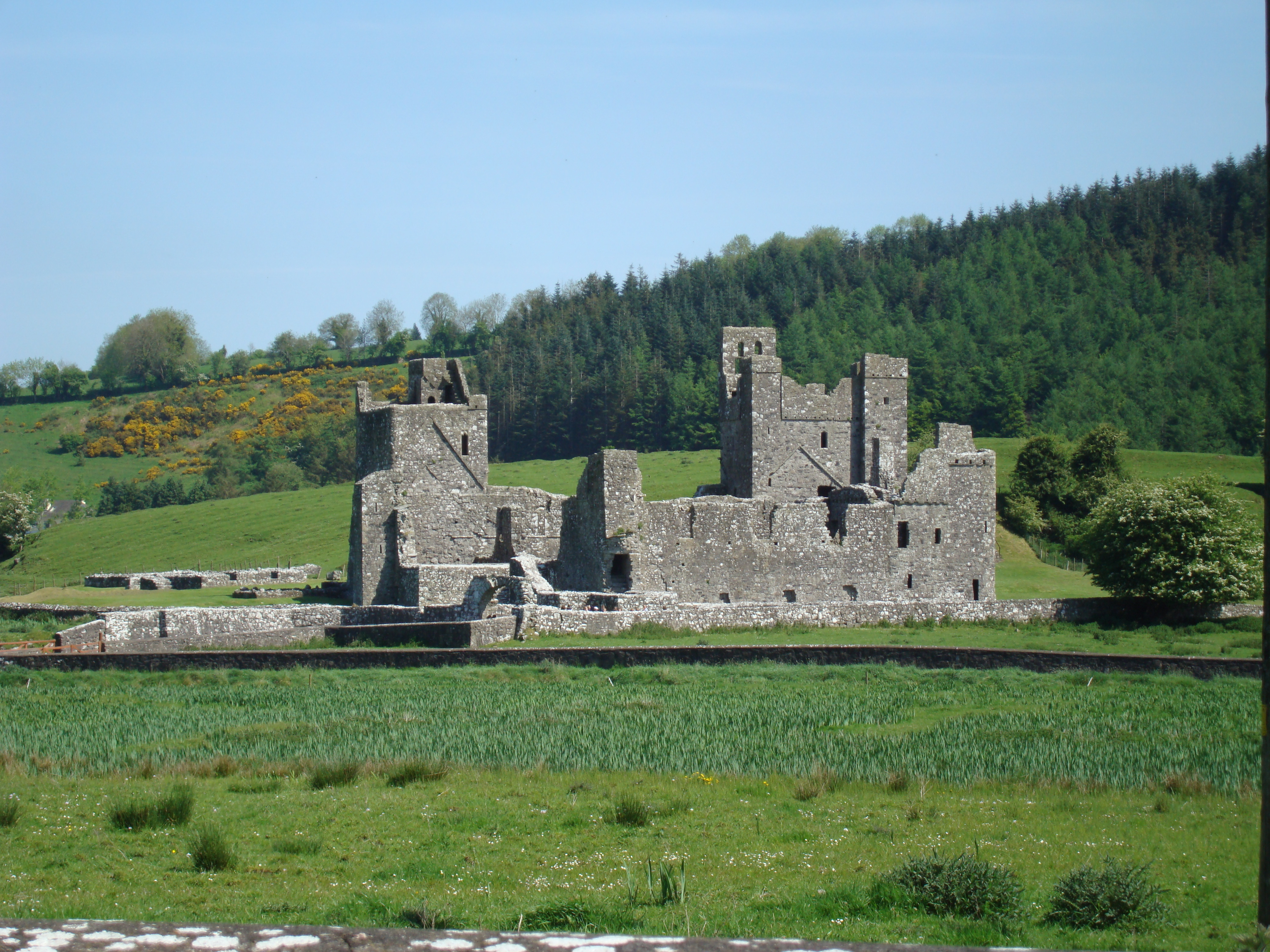
Fore Abbey was plundered in 1430 for claiming ownership of parishes in East Brefnian territory

O’Neill, eager to expand his kingdom's influence, happily obliged and entered the war along with his allied kingdoms Airgíalla and FirManach. The forces of O’Neill and his allies marched south and met with those of Fearghal, Talbot, O’Rourke and MacCabe at Achadh-cille-moire. The battle ended in a crushing defeat for Fearghal and his rebel forces and O’Neill continued his march into Leinster, joined by Eoghan na Feosaige, inflicting defeats on the Anglo-Normans of "South Meath" and the Plunketts and Herberts of "Westmeath" in 1430.

Eoghan na Feosaige had defeated the rebellion against him and defended his title, but at a cost. Tyrone had a policy of offering military or financial aid to other ruling families in exchange for subservience and recognition of the O’Neill's overlordship of their kingdoms. Following Eoghan na Feosaige's allegiance to O’Neill, the O’Reillys appear multiple times in the annals partaking in Tyrone's various wars across Ulster, illustrating East Breifne's position as a vassal state of Tyrone.

Eoghan na Feosaige died in 1449 and was buried in the monastery in Cavan. With the long disaffected claimant Fearghal still living, another dispute over the kingship was inevitable. Unlike in neighbouring West Breifne, where wars of succession were largely internal affairs decided by the clans of the kingdom, in East Breifne they were characterized by the prevalence of external forces and once again, Fearghal had the backing of some impressive allies. The English government in Dublin, headed by Richard Plantagenet the Duke of York, who had been appointed the Lord Lieutenant of Ireland in 1447, renewed their backing of Fearghal. He also received the support of Eoghan na Feosaige's brother Domnall and James Butler, 4th Earl of Ormond.

Sean an Einigh, Eoghan na Feosaige's son, received the support of Tyrone, and with it the support of the other magnates of Ulster. What could’ve spiraled into a protracted war of succession was avoided when Domnall dropped his support for Fearghal and backed his nephew Sean an Einigh in 1450. The heavily indebted Duke of York commanded a force of no more than 600 men and was forced to return to England in late 1449. This left Fearghal without the support of the lord lieutenant and no local support within East Breifne, up against the formidable forces of Ulster. Fearghal's second attempt to claim the kingship had floundered, and with Butler's death in 1452 the Clan Mahon O’Reilly were left without allies. Their sept never again gained kingship of East Breifne.

=== 16th century ===
==== Rift with Tyrone ====
Due to East Breifne's location, the O’Reillys historically held a unique position as mediators between the English and Anglo-Irish of Leinster and the Gaelic lords of Ulster. With the ever-present threat of further English expansion and its western rivals persisting with their centuries-old claim over the kingdom, political stability and the ability to balance strong alliances and play both sides were vital for the country's survival.

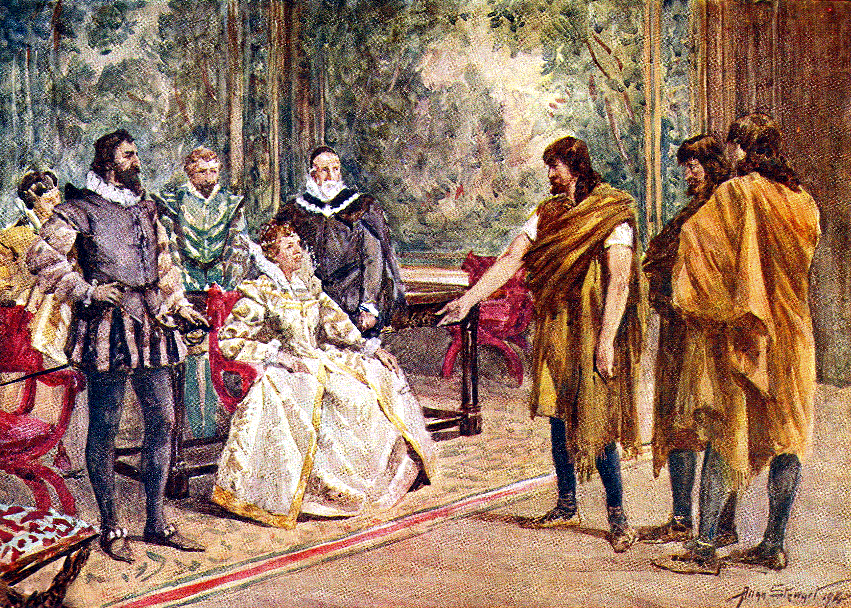
Shane O'Neill (right) conquered East Breifne in 1560

East Breifne's nearly 100-year alliance with Tyrone collapsed in the 1530s with the latter's affiliation with the Geraldine League. The league was an alliance that brought Conn O’Neill of Tyrone together with the Anglo-Irish FitzGeralds of Kildare, traditional enemies of the O'Reillys. This left East Breifne alienated from both the north and south and anxious to secure good relations with England as a bulwark against the historical dominance of their Tyrone overlords. In 1533 King Fearghal mac Seaain appealed directly to the government in England for redress against Tyrone, bypassing the Fitzgerald viceroy, who raided East Breifne in response to this circumvention of their authority.

Maolmordha O'Reilly was inaugurated in 1534 to replace the ailing Ferghal mac Seaain, but was met with opposition and had to secure his position and unify the kingdom. His inauguration coincided with the FitzGerald Rebellion, a campaign initially led by Manus O'Donnell to restore the 12-year-old Gerald FitzGerald to his title in Kildare, but which later expanded into a war against Henry VIII's encroachments in Ireland. Lord Deputy Leonard Grey demanded that O’Reilly join the English against the rebel league, but he refused due to internal instability and the insecurity of his position. Grey's hollow threats against the kingdom only strained relations.

In 1538 with his position secure, O’Reilly joined the English and gave strong support to their expeditions into Ulster against the Geraldine League. The rebellion collapsed following a heavy defeat at Lake Bellahoe in Monaghan and East Breifne was now regarded as one of the most dependable crown allies in Ireland. Maolmordha O’Reilly was an enthusiastic supporter of surrender and regrant as a way of not only officially securing his own title, but securing greater independence from Tyrone. He arrived at the parliament in Dublin in 1541 to take the oath of allegiance and initiate the process of surrendering his lands to be re-granted an English Lordship of them.

O’Reilly continued to serve the crown's interests, arranging a meeting between Lord Deputy Anthony St Ledger and Manus O'Donnell in Cavan in 1541, during which the latter agreed to travel to England and submit to the king. East Breifne sent soldiers to accompany Henry VIII's expedition into France in 1544 and in February 1546 during the Rough Wooing period, he offered to send his eldest son Aodh Connallach to command the forces of the English king in Scotland.

Tyrone would again cast its shadow over East Breifne during Shane O’Neill's conquest of Ulster from 1559 to 1567. The virulently anti-English O’Neill took aim at every lord who co-operated with them and by 1560 was the undisputed ruler of Ulster "from Drogheda to Erne". The restrictions placed on the O’Reilly kings of East Breifne by the English to rein in their power proved to be their undoing, as the kingdom's force of less than 600 men was decimated by O’Neill's army of over 5,000. The entire English garrison for the whole of Ireland at this time was no more than 2,500. East Breifne was burnt and pillaged by O’Neill, and the O’Reillys were once again forced to submit to a Tyrone king. Maolmordha died in 1565 and was succeeded by Aodh Connallach.

=== Rapprochement with England ===
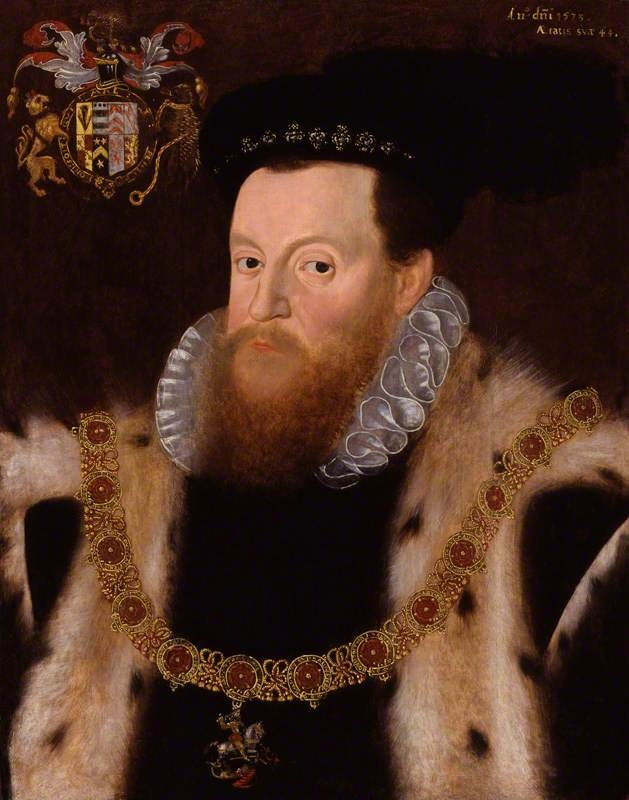
Lord Deputy Henry Sidney and King Aodh Connallach pioneered the establishment of County Cavan

Aodh and the newly appointed Lord Deputy Henry Sidney developed a close relationship. Upon coming to power he rebelled against Tyrone and supported Sidney against Shane O’Neill and his successor Turlough Luineach in the early 1570s. In turn, Sidney helped Aodh crush dissent against his kingship domestically. Sidney regarded Aodh as "the finest of Irishmen" and repeatedly recommended the establishment of an English shire in East Breifne.

Aodh gave up his son John to Sidney in 1575. John was to be his agent in England and he travelled with Sidney to Hampton Court to formally surrender his father's lordship. John remained in England for eight years, where he learned to speak and write English fluently and became well versed in English law and agricultural practices. Due to the ruling O’Reilly elite's willingness to work within English institutions it was decided that East Breifne, traditionally seen as part of Connacht, was to be excluded from the first Composition of Connaught in 1577. Instead, the Lord Deputy of Ireland was to deal directly with the kingdom.

First the border disputes between East Breifne and the Pale had to be resolved. Attorney General William Drury travelled to the border town of Kells in May 1579 to "determine the hurt done" between the people of the frontier and the O’Reillys. At Kells he met with Aodh, who had travelled alone. Aware that the O’Reilly king lacked the power to properly police his own borders, Drury refused to negotiate and instructed Aodh to gather his sons and the nobles of East Breifne and return when they also agreed to settle the border dispute.

Later that year the ailing Aodh, his son Pilib and Tánaiste Emon unexpectedly rode to Dublin with a band of horsemen to submit their lordship and apply for it to be made a shire. Following this, William Drury again travelled north and toured East Breifne to seal the agreement, after which Aodh travelled to England and was knighted.

==== Formation of County Cavan ====
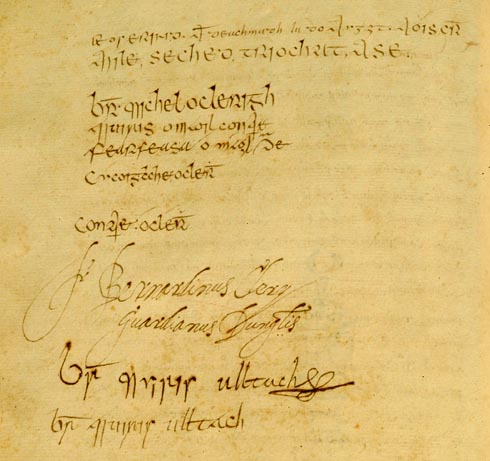
Pilib O'Reilly commissioned an extensive amount of bardic poetry to propagandise his achievements

On 21 August 1579 East Breifne was officially shired as County Cavan against the backdrop of separate rebellions in Munster and Ulster by James Fitzmaurice and Turlough Luineach respectively. Unlike other counties such as Westmeath and Queen's, there was no parliamentary statute passed to establish Cavan. It was instead created as part of an emergency defence act to protect the Pale from the aforementioned rebellions. As such, little progress was made in implementing English laws and institutions in the new county. One of the major pitfalls of dealing with the Tudor government which would consistently aggravate relations - its unaccountability - was obvious just months after the agreement was made. Sir Aodh wrote to Attorney General Lucas Dillon in November to inform him that parts of his kingdom had been looted and destroyed by English captains, and that he "being under his Majesty's laws" should not be subject to such provocations. His grievances were not addressed by the government in Dublin.

By 1580 Aodh's health had declined dramatically and he retreated from public life, although still officially the king. The country faced a potential crisis against an ascendant and hostile Tyrone and with John still in England, Aodh's second son Pilib became his lieutenant and the chief defender of East Breifne. During this time Pilib demonstrated that he could capably lead the country through the turbulence. His proficiency in Gaelic politics proved invaluable. He sealed an alliance with the Maguires through marriage, continued to strengthen East Breifne's alliance with Tyrone's enemy Tyrconnell, opened communications with the Fitzgeralds and even harmonized relations with the O’Rourkes. The Annals of the Four Masters record that Pilib crushed an attempted invasion by the O'Neills in 1581, before negotiating a peace with them later that year. The ability to project a show of strength was vital to the reputation of any Gaelic leader and as such, rather than depending on the lethargic Dublin government for security, he raised an army by drawing support from the military castes of East Breifne and reached out to every branch of the O’Reilly sept to unify the kingdom and steer an independent path between Tyrone and England.

His time as de facto ruler of East Breifne made him the most powerful and popular figure in the kingdom. Pilib however, grew discontent with his position in English law as the second son. He had defended the kingdom during his brother's absence and his father's illness but was passed over when his brother returned. Pilib argued that he should be made king based on his merits:

"A king's son is not chosen for his age; virtue is the true measure of the claim, whoever may come to choose a king, it is deeds that must determine the choice"

Had the Gaelic system of clan elections been in place, it's very likely Pilib would have been made king, however John returned when Aodh Connallach died in early 1583 and Pilib stepped aside. John's ascension was still contested by his uncle Emon, Aodh's brother, who asserted his claim to the kingship. The two men went to the Privy Council for arbitration in June 1583, illustrating their willingness to assimilate into English customs. John's legal expertise allowed him to put forward a strong defence of his right to the kingship and it was decided by the council that he should receive the title. Emon was to continue his tenure as Tánaiste (deputy leader).

The decision left both Pilib and Emon disaffected and they continued to challenge John's rule. Although rivals, they were both united in their opposition to John. It quickly became clear to the new Lord Deputy John Perrot that Sir John O’Reilly was incapable of controlling the situation and Perrot laid down plans for the permanent division of the O’Reilly lordship.

=== Composition of 1584 ===
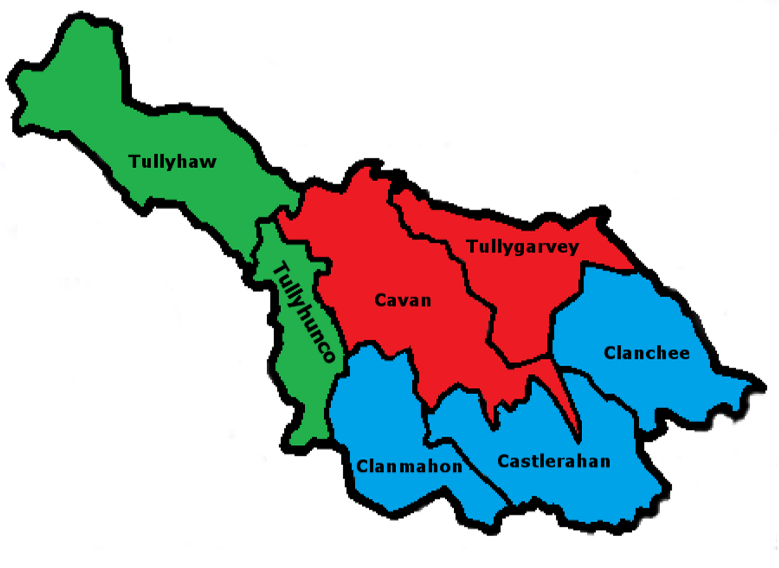
Territorial Changes Red: Land held by John O’Reilly Blue: Land granted to other O’Reillys Green: Land granted to other clans

John O’Reilly's government put their position on the line in their determination to cooperate fully with the English authorities and assimilate East Breifne, shired as County Cavan in 1579, into the Kingdom of Ireland in the face of severe internal opposition. O’Reilly and Perrot toured East Breifne and met with the ruling clans for over a year until late 1584. During their tour the boundaries of the county and its seven tuaithe, which became baronies, were mapped. The two men negotiated and signed treaties to secure the division of East Breifne amongst its ruling elite and finalise a composition for the county.

The controversial agreement was designed to hasten the transformation of Cavan into a fully-fledged English-style county. It involved huge concessions from O’Reilly but, having established himself as a shrewd diplomat with many powerful connections, John intended to resolve the internal instability of his kingdom with the agreement and secure his own position. Its implementation began in 1585 but was never fully realised and ultimately destroyed his domestic reputation.

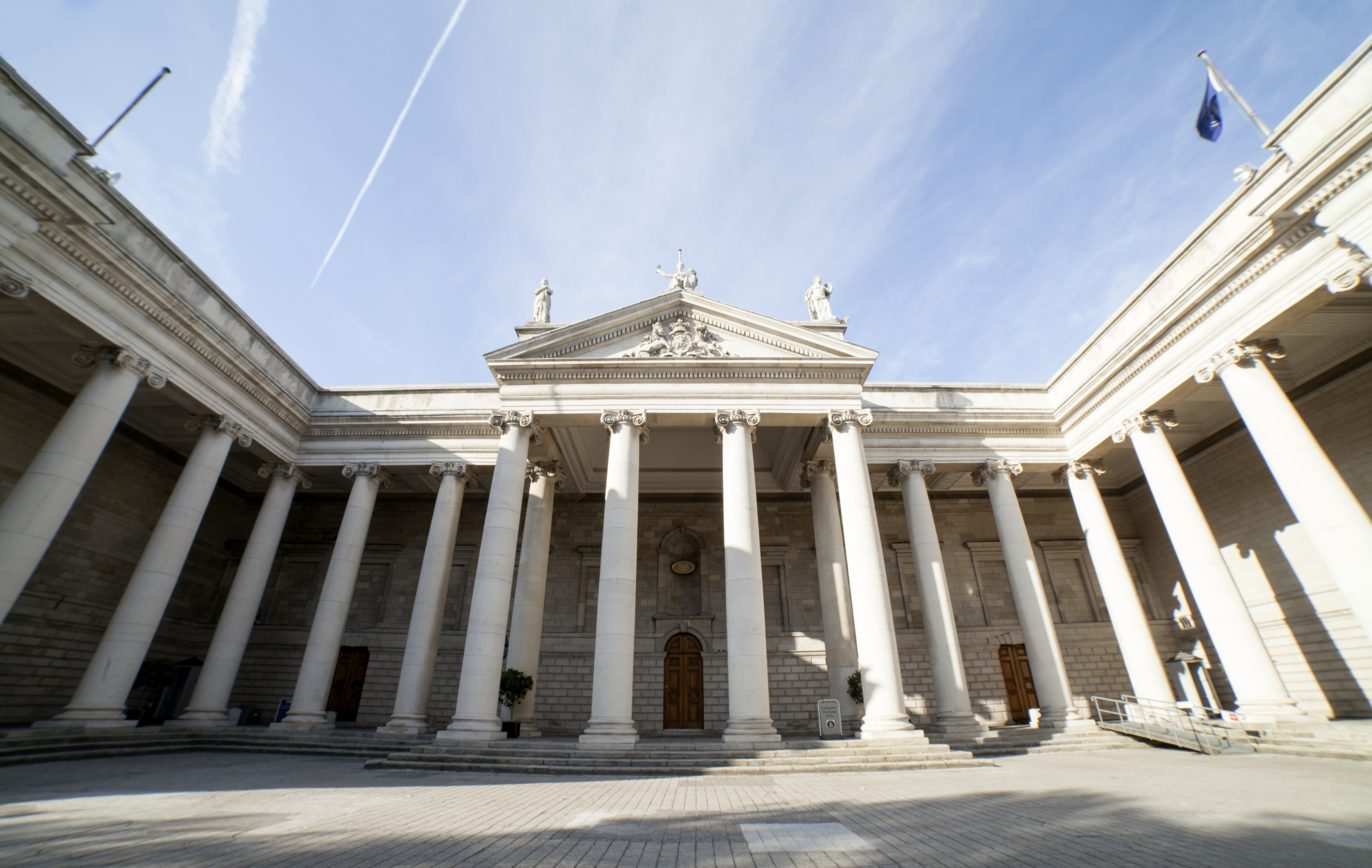
In 1585 Pilib and Emon O'Reilly became the first MPs to represent Cavan at the Irish Parliament in Dublin

Under the terms of the composition, the power of "The O’Reilly" was greatly diminished, so much so that the chieftaincy itself was abolished, which included revoking his traditional claim as overlord of the clans of East Breifne. He gave up roughly half of his kingdom as part of the agreement, agreed to a fixed annual crown rent, ceded land to political rivals within his own sept and recognized the proprietal independence of freeholders within the lands which he still held. The office of High Sheriff which was previously supposed to be held by an O’Reilly was given to Henry Duke, a nobleman from Meath, who was appointed to ensure the composition's implementation. English garrisons were stationed across the county, although at the service of John O’Reilly. The position of Tánaiste was also abolished.

Two largely independent territories – Tullyhaw and Tullyhunco were incorporated into the county. These territories were historically part of West Breifne and recognized the O’Rourkes as their overlords and paid exactions to them, but by the early 1500s had drifted into the sphere of the O’Reillys, who since at least 1512 had provided military aid and protection to them. Both of these were made into baronies and the ruling clans - The MacGaurans in Tullyhaw and MacKeirnans in Tullyhunco – remained in power, subject to the administration in Dublin but independent of the O’Reillys in Cavan.

Several prominent members of the O’Reilly sept were made freeholders. John's uncle and former Tánaiste Emon was granted the barony of Castlerahan and was put in charge of rent collection for the entire county. The barony of Clanmahon was divided between Cathaoir Gearr, John's other uncle, and the influential local magnate Pilib an Phrior of Clan Mahon. These territories also answered directly to the government instead of John O’Reilly.

John's brother Pilib, as an heir to the chieftaincy, petitioned against the composition. Pilib had been agitating for the kingship ever since his brother's appointment and, in abolishing his own lordship, John was also abolishing the title Pilib was in line to receive and dismantling the kingdom he had worked so hard to unify. Pilib also posed a legal challenge to the composition, as under Brehon law the land was strictly owned by the whole clan, and John was merely a trustee. Although the division of the kingdom was meant to solve the political tension, Pilib and his supporters seemed willing to derail the agreement and seize the lordship through violent means. To appease Pilib, he was granted the barony of Clanchee and was to represent Cavan at the parliament in Dublin.

Despite these attempts to pacify Pilib, he continued to defy the agreement and used his position as an MP to press for its revocation. Following his unruly behavior at Parliament in 1586 he was kidnapped and imprisoned at Dublin Castle for 6 years. Both John and the Lord Deputy had hoped this would put an end to the growing popularity at home for Pilib's proposed annulment of the composition, but support for him only increased during his incarceration. His arrest also bred public resentment of John and bardic prose written during this time called for Pilib to be made king of East Breifne upon his release.

=== Breakdown of relations 1588–1594 ===
In yet another blow to the composition, Emon broke ranks with John and the county administration in early 1588 and raided into Longford where he and his men killed ten people. Despite its problems, the composition, and more generally the policy of surrender and regrant, appeared somewhat successful for a brief period from 1585 to 1587. However the O’Reillys' determination to implement it was the exception, not the rule. It took place against the backdrop of collapsing English power across Ireland, particularly in Ulster and Munster, and the policy has been historically viewed as a failure.

The clans of East Breifne, who were more amenable to English influence than any others in Ireland, gradually became more skeptical of their own policy of rapprochement with England. The attempts to assimilate East Breifne into English jurisdiction and law had dragged on for decades with limited progress and little to no visible benefit; even the most anglophile Breifnians had grown disillusioned with the idea. The process of integration was a slow one and the Tudor government did not give their administrators in Ireland the freedom to make concrete or fair agreements with the native lordships. As such, to many within East Breifne it seemed that their leaders were continually surrendering powers to the English and receiving no concessions from them.

One of the primary ways in which Gaelic leaders in the 16th century showed their strength and credibility as rulers was through the retention of a large army and possession of spoils obtained from raids on neighboring kingdoms and lesser clans. By restricting both the size of their army and banning them from raiding, the Dublin government had removed a key pillar of the O’Reillys' power. Although England would go on to dominate Ireland, at the time this was not obvious.

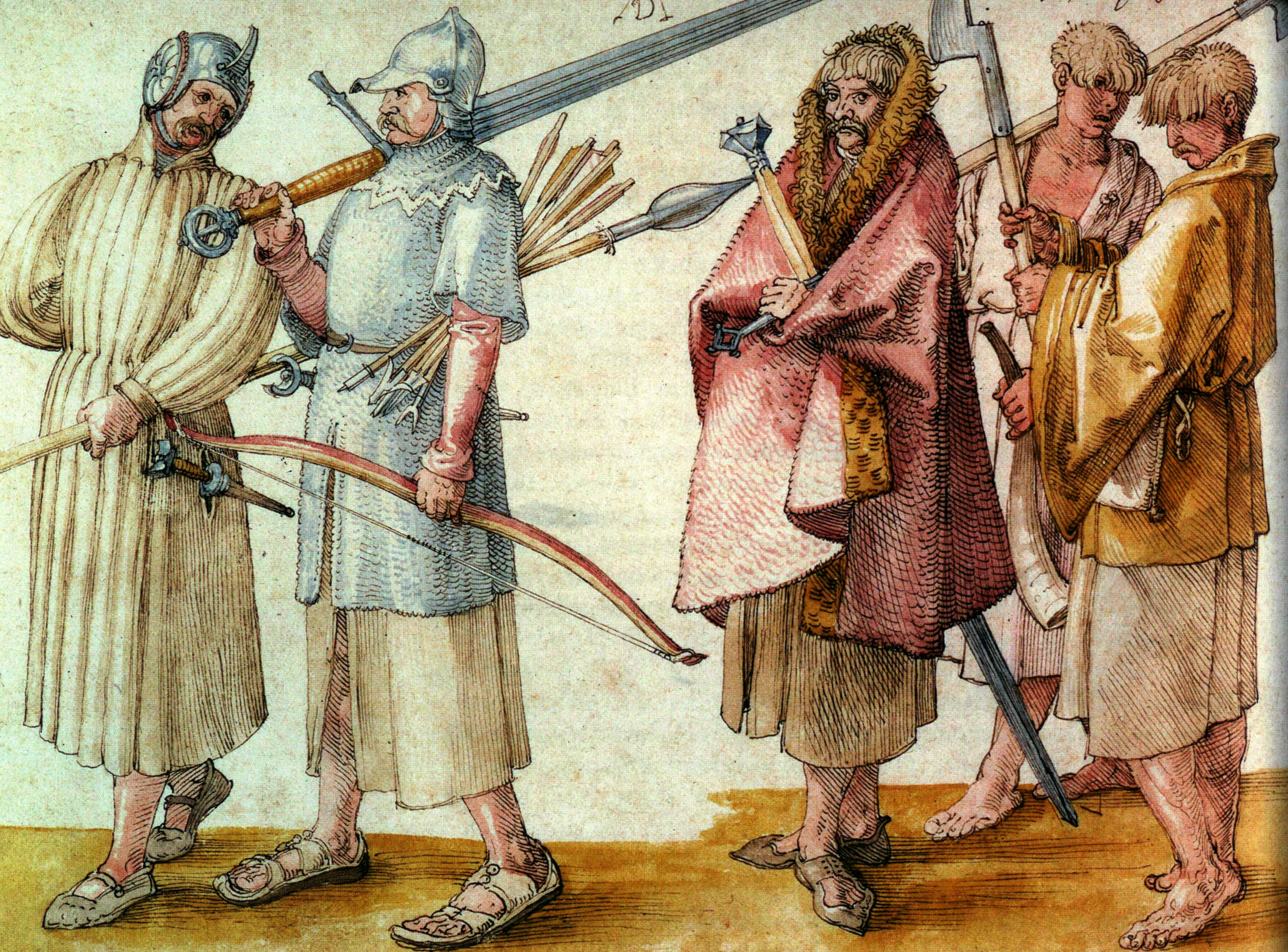
The banning of gallowglass and restrictions placed on the maintenance of an East Breifnian army left the kingdom highly exposed to attacks

Despite decades of conflict between England and Tyrone, the O’Neills were stronger than ever by 1590 and had made an ally out of their former enemy Tyrconnell. A series of high-profile rebellions in Munster in the 1570s and 80s and the existence of lordships that were totally independent of English rule in Connacht and Leinster made their grasp over Ireland look very tenuous. Just as it had done during Shane O'Neill's rebellion in the 1560s, English policy had once again left East Breifne exposed to attacks from its hostile neighbours. The restrictions placed upon them coupled with the abuses of power by crown officials within the kingdom caused the O’Reillys to lose their faith in government officials and they grew resentful of their presence.

John Perrot was recalled to England in January 1588 and Sir William Fitzwilliam was re-instated as Lord Deputy in July. FitzWilliam replaced all of Perrot's staff and pursued a much more aggressive policy of conquest in Ireland. The growing animosity between the elite of East Breifne and the English government came to a head in 1589 with the appointment of Sir Edward Herbert as High Sheriff for a term of seven years. Herbert was unknown and unconnected in Cavan and exercised his power by expanding the number of officials, advisors and assistants working for him, all of which had to be paid for through East Breifne's public taxes. Herbert quickly garnered a reputation for brutality and suspended cooperation with the Gaelic judicial system and native lords, instead he ruled by martial law.

The O’Reillys composed a book of complaints detailing the misconduct of Herbert. Among the abuses listed were Herbert's summary execution of John's son-in-law Brian MacFerrall, whose head was sent along with those of three others to Dublin. John O’Reilly's son Mulmurray was arrested for allegedly raiding a neighboring territory. Herbert also confiscated church property and illegally sold it off. A furious John O’Reilly complained directly to Fitzwilliam but his complaints were ignored. In January 1590 Chief Justice Robert Gardiner was instructed by the Queen's chief secretary Francis Walsingham to draft a declaration restraining the use of martial law in Ireland by lesser officials such as sheriffs, captains, seneschals and governors. However, Walsingham died in April and the reforms outlined by him and Gardiner would not be revisited until June 1592. Herbert's tyranny was apparent, a government survey of the county in July 1592 found that its jails were overloaded with prisoners, including several from the O’Reilly sept.

Lucas Dillon wrote to Perrot (who was no longer in power) expressing his worry over the deteriorating situation in East Breifne, explaining that John O’Reilly and other high ranking nobles had written to him outlining their grievances. Fitzwilliam billeted his large campaign army upon East Breifne during his tour of Ulster in 1590, adding yet another financial burden on the kingdom. FitzWilliam's reckless behavior throughout Ireland was leading to an explosive situation. He overlooked Richard Bingham's abuses in Connacht, particularly against the O’Rourkes of West Breifne. He appointed Captain Willis as High Sheriff of Tyrconnell and Fermanagh and allowed his men to rampage across the territory, provoking the O’Donnells and Maguires. FitzWilliam also executed the MacMahon lord of Monaghan and divided up his territory amongst planters, including Robert Devereux, the Earl of Essex. The English garrisons in "loyal" Irish lordships such as East Breifne, which were intended to be used as defensive deterrents against hostile lordships, were now being used as an arbitrary tool of oppression against the natives.

Pilib escaped from Dublin castle alongside Red Hugh O’Donnell in 1591 and returned to Cavan. O'Donnell continued to oppose English rule in his home country, whereas Pilib pledged to support the composition upon his return. Pilib joined forces with his brother John to wrest back control of the county from the restive factions within it. By 1594 Ulster had broken out into open rebellion, and with it parts of County Cavan, and Pilib reprised his role as the territory's chief protector against the rebel forces.

=== Nine Years' War 1594–1603 ===
As the frontier between the government in the pale and the rebel forces in Ulster, the English made holding County Cavan a priority during the Nine Years' War. English garrisons were stationed in Cavan town, which was used as a base of operations for raids against O’Neill and his allies. The English garrison led by Henry Duke and Edward Herbert marched north from Cavan into Fermanagh to put down the rebellion across the border, but were soundly defeated by the forces of Hugh Maguire and retreated back to Cavan town alarmed by the growing size of the rebel forces. Pilib was approached by FitzWilliam in December 1594 and was tasked with defending Cavan town and county. He was also tasked with raising soldiers from each barony for the English army. John O’Reilly had fallen into disrepute and was sidelined. Cavan town was devastated in a raid by the Maguires and MacMahons in 1595, government forces had reinforced the Franciscan friary and were able to hold it. Another reported attack destroyed "all but two castles" which belonged to the MacBradys. By June 1595 the English had faltered in the face of the rebellion and had been almost completely pushed out of Connacht and Ulster after suffering a string of defeats. Much of county Cavan had been seized by the rebels and, with no further aid on the horizon, John and Pilib travelled north to Dungannon to submit personally to Hugh O’Neill and join the Irish alliance.

John O’Reilly died of illness in 1596 and left two sons, Maelmora and Hugh. In defiance of English succession law, Hugh O’Neill proclaimed Pilib king of East Breifne. Pilib's first act was to reinstate Brehon Law and tanistry and ban all other laws. The English government had hoped to reach out to Pilib, who, having spent much of his life fighting against the O'Neills, was believed to harbour antipathy towards them. However, nothing came of this as that same year, before he could even be inaugurated, Pilib was accidentally shot and killed by a stray musket bullet fired by one of O'Neill's soldiers. His Tánaiste Eamonn, whose affinity for Tyrone was well documented, was made king that October in a traditional Gaelic inauguration ceremony on Seantóman Hill.

Following John's death, his son Maelmora claimed the kingship but was swiftly exiled and moved to Dublin intent on repairing his family's relationship with England. He was received by Queen Elizabeth and granted a patent to become the Earl of Cavan. He commanded a regiment of English cavalry in Ulster alongside Marshal Henry Bagenal until both men were slain at the Battle of the Yellow Ford in August 1598. Maelmora's death left Eamonn as the uncontested king, John's second son Hugh being too young to rule. As the clearest route between Ulster and Leinster, the war took a heavy toll on County Cavan and its populace. Between 1596 and 1602 the control of Cavan town changed hands between the Irish alliance and the English at least four times. Eamonn remained a committed member of the Irish alliance and reigned until his death in April 1601 at an advanced age:

He was an aged, grey-headed, long-memoried man, and who had been quick and vivacious in his mind and intellect in his youth. He was buried in the Franciscan monastery at Cavan; and his brother's son, namely, Owen, son of Hugh Conallagh, was elected in his place." - Annals of the Four Masters

Eoghan (Owen) ruled for the remainder of the war and was killed during its reconquest, leaving his brother Maolmhordha as acting chief. Cavan was finally retaken during Baron Mountjoy's campaign into Ulster during the last stages of the war. With over 18,000 English soldiers at his command, and the Irish alliance exhausted and fragmented, Mountjoy made stunning gains across Ulster in 1602, forcing O'Neill and the other rebel Irish lords to sign the Treaty of Mellifont in March 1603.

=== Aftermath ===
English victory in the Nine Years' War was a watershed moment in Irish history, often seen as the end of Gaelic Ireland. For the first time ever the Kingdom of Ireland was in control of the entire island and the destruction wrought by the war left the Gaelic kingdoms immeasurably weakened. Seeing the irrevocable changes in land and law being implemented across the island, and fearing for their safety, many Irish nobles left for mainland Europe, culminating in the Flight of the Earls in 1607. By virtue of departing Ireland without permission these Irish nobles had broken their oaths to the Crown and as such the Crown attainted them and confiscated their lands. This formally began preparations for the Plantation of Ulster.

==== Plantation of Cavan ====
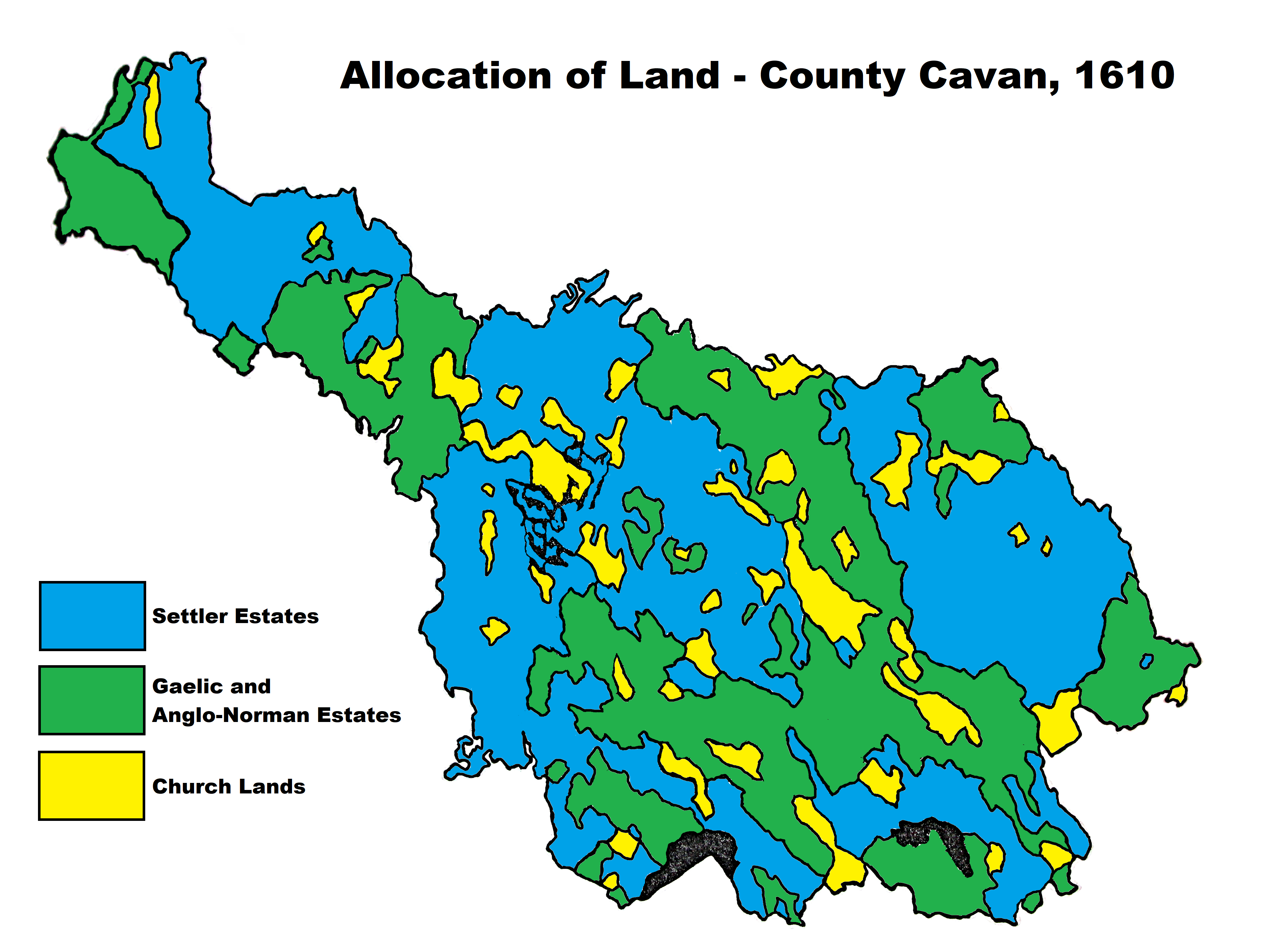
64% of Cavan's approximately 500,000 acres was allocated to settlers during the initial plantation

Due to its historic close relations with the government in Dublin, the people of Cavan were deemed more pliant than elsewhere in Ulster. As such, it was the first place Chichester visited prior to the plantation. When there, he asked English administrators in the conquered county to set up courts which would evaluate all land that had been freed up by those who had left in exile, those who had died during the rebellion, and those who had lost the rights to their lands through an attainder. Nearly all high-ranking members of the clan had died during the war, but 52 lower members of the O'Reilly clan were still attainted. Of the few who were granted land, Sir John O'Reilly's grandson Mulmory was granted 3,000 acres along with two smaller estates which contained ancestral homes. The acting chief Maolmhordha had sought a pardon and was granted 2,000 acres. The age of the O'Reilly dynasty had come to an end.

In a further attempt to stamp English authority onto the territory, Chichester ordered in 1610 for the castle on Tullymongan Hill, seat of the O'Reilly kings for over 200 years, to be seized and given to an English family. This was never acted upon, although the castle, which was ruined during the war, was later demolished. As was the case in the rest of Ulster, many other Irish clans had their lands confiscated as well and the county was opened up to wholesale plantation by English and Scottish Protestant settlers. The first surveys undertaken were those of Josias Bodley in 1609 and 1613 in which the county was divided into "good land" and "poor land" and re-distributed to planters and natives accordingly.

Pynnar's Survey of 1619, which was commissioned to examine the progress of the plantations, lists the remaining landholding O'Reillys. Six specific persons were outlined in Duffy's Hibernian Magazine in 1861.

"Shane MacPhilip O'Rellie, who got nine hundred acres in the precinct of Castlerahin. 2. Mulmorie, Mac-Philip O'Reyley, a thousand acres called Iterry-Outra, in the precinct of Tullagarvy. 3. Captain Reley, a thousand acres, called Lisconnor, in the precinct of Tullaghgarvy; all his tenants do plough by the Tail. 4. Mulmorie Oge O'Relie (Maelmora O'Reilly's son), three thousand acres, &c., in the same. His tenants do all plough by the Tail. 5. Mulmorry macHugh O'Reley, two thousand acres, called Commet, in the precinct of Clanmahown. 6. Philip MacTirlagh, three hundred acres, called Wateragh, in the same."

Having learned from the unsuccessful Munster plantation, a much greater emphasis was placed on urbanization and the creation of towns as a means of successful colonization. To this end, Cavan was the first town in Ulster to be granted a charter by King James I in 1610, as it was already a relatively large pre-existing urban centre. Other towns such as Virginia and Killeshandra were founded during the plantations. There was also a general cap of 2,000 acres placed on good land estates, to avoid the estate becoming unmanageably large and falling into disrepair as was seen in Munster, where some individual plantations were as large as 70,000 acres.

By 1618 it was recorded that 386 English families had settled in County Cavan. The native Irish, who were overwhelmingly Catholic, and the settlers, who were Anglican and Presbyterian, co-existed in an uneasy peace until the anti-Catholic Long Parliament gained traction in England in 1640. Fear of invasion and prosecution by the English Protestants sparked the Irish Rebellion of 1641 and the establishment of Confederate Ireland, during which time Colonel Philip O'Reilly, Sir John O'Reilly's grandson, raised an army of 1,200 men in Cavan to oppose English rule. His younger brother Myles was briefly styled as "king of East Breifne" once again. The Irish royalists were defeated during the Cromwellian conquest of Ireland and further confiscation of land ensued. By 1670, 89% of County Cavan's land was in the possession of British settlers.

== Society ==
=== Commerce ===
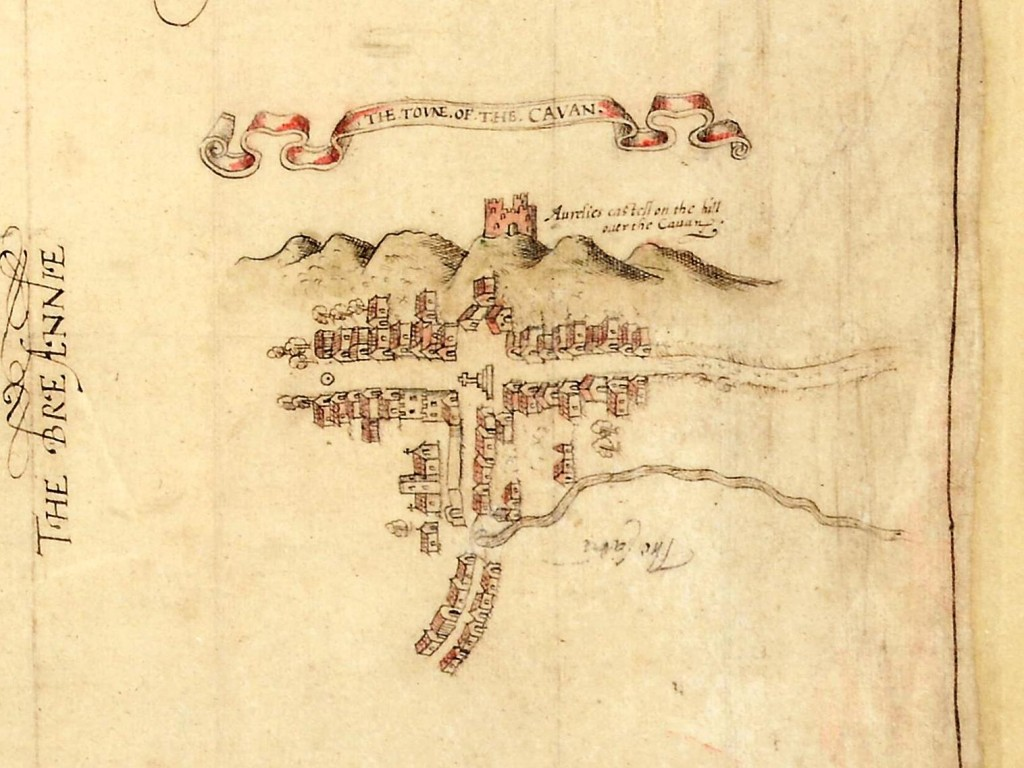
Map of Cavan town from 1591 showing its market square and the O'Reilly castle on Tullymongan Hill

Despite its precarious position between two often hostile powers, the lords of Ulster in the north and the English of the Pale in the south, East Breifne emerged as a very affluent kingdom in the 15th century. In fact, its location was a major contributing factor to its prosperity. The O'Reillys had already been granted a licence to trade in the Pale in 1390, but the establishment of Cavan and its expansion as a market town under Eoghan na Feosaige greatly increased the kingdom's wealth and importance. Due to hostility between the English government and the Irish lordships, Cavan acted as an intermediary. Anglo-Irish merchants could travel safely to Cavan to trade beyond the Pale, and the Irish merchants could sell their wares such as hides, livestock, wool and timber at market, free of any English government trade restrictions.

The growth of Cavan as a marketplace became such a problem to Anglo-Irish market towns such as Trim and Athboy that the English government attempted to ban their merchants from trading in Gaelic territories in 1479, fearing that the markets in "Orailly's country" would bring "great riches to the King's enemies, and great poverty to the King's subjects". This concern appears to be well founded, as the O'Reillys amassed so much wealth in the 15th and 16th centuries that the saying "The Life of Riley", which refers to someone living a carefree and spendthrift lifestyle, is believed to have originated in reference to the clan. East Breifne's identity as a trading nation that attracted merchants from all over the island is further reflected by its genealogy, as large numbers of Anglo-Irish families from Leinster and Irish families from more remote areas of Ulster, Munster and Connacht settled within the kingdom.

Towards the end of the 16th century the town resembled a traditional medieval town, with a central market square and linear streets with about fifty houses. The O'Reillys enlisted the help of the wealthy MacBrady clan to develop Cavan town. Existing documents record the O'Reillys granting the MacBrady's contracts to build windmills, houses and pave the streets of the town. As a consequence of the region's turbulent politics, the town was attacked, destroyed and rebuilt multiple times throughout its history. The Nine Years' War, which devastated not only East Breifne but all of Ireland, seems to have done lasting damage, as Arthur Chichester's 1606 tour of the county reports the existence of "a poor town bearing the name Cavan, seated betwixt many hills".

==== O'Reilly's money ====
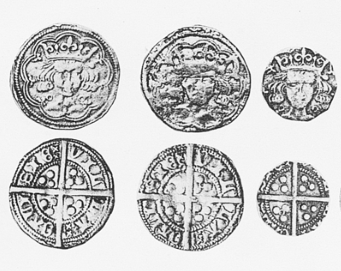
"O'Reilly's money"

Uniquely amongst the Irish kingdoms, where money was uncommonly used and bartering was the primary means of trade, the O'Reilly developed their own currency and minted their own coinage. This currency has been historically called "O'Reilly's money", or "Reillys", referring to the coins themselves. East Breifne was long considered the only Gaelic kingdom with its own currency and a developed centralized economy; however, it is today known that the economy of Tyrconnell was equally (if not more) elaborate. Nonetheless, the currency of the O'Reillys remains unmatched in Ireland in terms of circulation and existing examples.

The coins were first minted following the introduction of English coins to Dublin by Henry IV in the early 15th century. The original East Breifnian coins, minted at Cavan, borrowed heavily from these in terms of design. As a result, East Breifne became notorious for harbouring coiners who would melt down English coins, which were made of pure silver, and coat base metal replica coins in said silver. The blame for the explicit destruction of English coins was placed on the O'Reillys. Two acts of Parliament in 1447 and 1456 outlawed the production and usage of "Reilly's silver" which at the time "increase[d] from one day to another". Given that the vast majority of counterfeit coins uncovered by archaeologists were found in the Cavan-Meath and Cavan-Fermanagh border area, its very likely that the O'Reilly kings condoned this practice, and possibly engaged in it. In the late 16th century it was revealed that Brian O'Rourke, king of neighboring West Breifne, had for decades paid unjust rent to the Governor of Connaught using counterfeit coins.

=== Culture and government ===
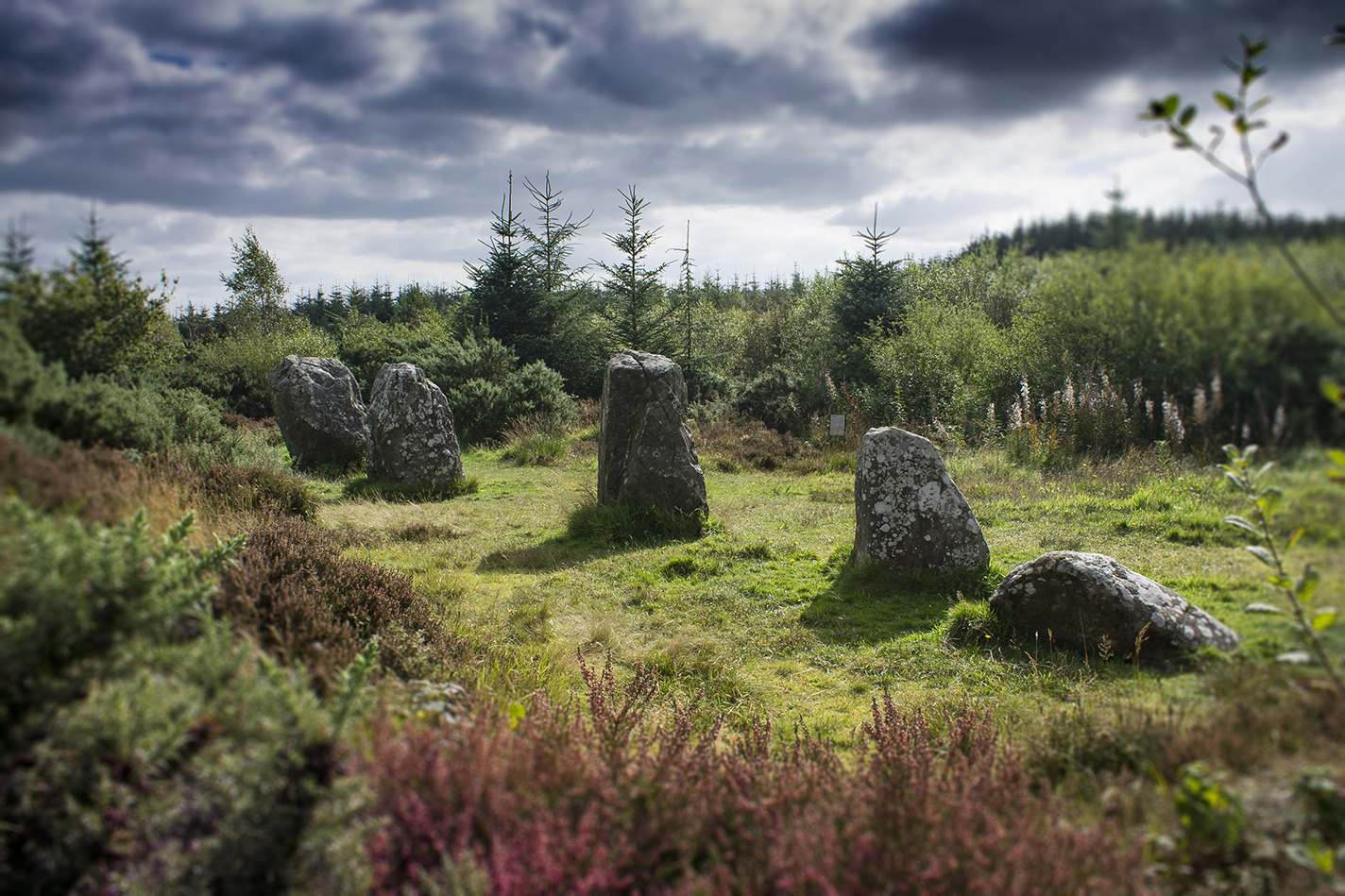
Fionn's Fingers on Shantemon Hill was the inauguration site of the King of East Breifne.

Like most Irish kingdoms, East Breifne was neither a centralised state nor a monarchy in the traditional sense. Instead, it was divided into smaller territories such as tuaithe which were ruled by local lords and chiefs. These chiefs had varying degrees of autonomy depending on the size or prestige of the clan, or simply the location of their territory. The kingdom had seven tuaths which became the seven (later eight) baronies of County Cavan. These tuaths were subdivided into smaller territorial units known as ballybetaghs. A ballybetagh was controlled by the smaller clans that exercised very little autonomy. Clans of this type would have been by far the most numerous. Ballybetaghs were also subdivided into even smaller units known as Townlands. East Breifne contained 1,979 townlands ranging in size from as small as 1 acre (usually lake islets) to over 3,000 acres. Larger clans such as the Mac Samhradhain that held distinct, defined territories were more or less self-governing. The O'Reilly clan were the suzerain of the other clans, essentially having a divine right to rule as descendants of the possibly mythical Brión mac Echach Muigmedóin.

The system of tanistry was used to elect a monarch from within the O'Reilly sept. This practice dates back to pre-recorded history. Upon the death or retirement of a king, his Tánaiste would become the new king. This new king would then gather the various different branches of the clan and they would agree upon a new Tánaiste to succeed the king upon his death or retirement. During succession disputes the king was usually elected directly by his supporters. In these instances the other clans played a role in the process by pledging their support to their favoured candidate. This differs from a hereditary monarchy in that a Tánaiste had to be an adult, i.e. a king's newborn son could not be immediately chosen as his successor. The inauguration site for the O'Reilly kings was Seantóman (Shantemon) Hill, 5 km from Cavan town.

During the introduction of English law into East Breifne in the mid 16th century, tanistry was discontinued in favour of the English succession practice of the sitting king passing the title to his eldest son. This was only done once in East Breifne's history whereby Aodh Connallach's eldest son John became king in 1583, rather than the Tánaiste Emon. Following John's death in 1596 during the Nine Years' War, English law was banned and all the last kings were chosen through tanistry.

==== Law ====
Brehon law was practiced throughout the great majority of Ireland from the 13th to the 17th century. In the 15th century, Eoghan na Feosaige, who was a well-versed brehon judge, introduced his own set of laws and statutes which all citizens of Breifne were to abide. There is very little existing record of these laws, and how long they were in effect is unknown, but like Brehon law they appear to have been civil rather than criminal. One of Eoghan na Feosaige's laws, outlined by Henry Piers in the 17th century reads:

Sometimes it so falleth out that a cross-grained Brood refuseth to afford his help (at ploughing), and when required thereto by his landlord, looking on himself as sufficient enough for his own need without any coadjutor, in this case, although the custom obliges him to aid the said to bring every day into the field his horses and his tackle and offer also his own labour to the refusing party to offer also his proportion of feed in its proper season and then although the refuser that denied throughout, the demander is to reap at harvest as good a portion of the crop out of the refuser's labours, as if he had been at expense all the year long.

Within East Breifne, as part of the gradual process of integration into the Kingdom of Ireland, Brehon Law and English Law were practiced in duality in the courts of the country in the mid to late 16th century.

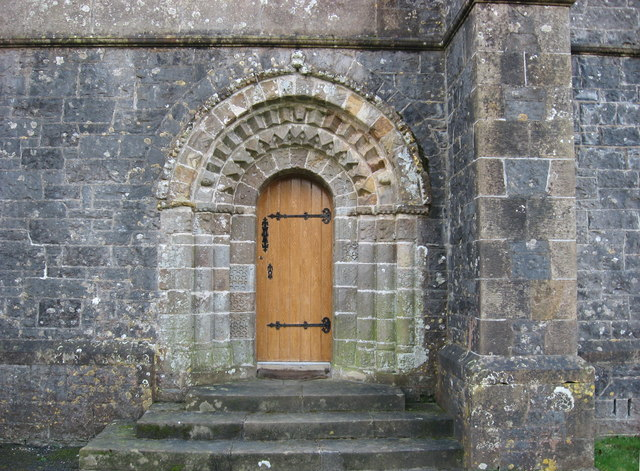
12th Century Romanesque doorway at St Fethlimidh's Cathedral, Kilmore

==== Religion ====
The old territory of Breifne roughly corresponds to the Roman Catholic Diocese of Kilmore and the clans of East Breifne, chiefly the MacBradys and O'Reillys, provided numerous bishops to the diocese. Christianity spread to the Breifne region in the 6th century and patronage of the church and monasteries remained important for the reputation of kings for many centuries. The monasteries were used extensively as cemeteries and the Franciscan friary in Cavan town, founded c. 1300, became the traditional burial place for the O'Reilly kings and queens thereafter.

Along with trade, there was also frequent religious crossover between Breifne and the Pale, and the abbey of St. Mary's in Trim was almost always run by a Gaelic abbot from East Breifne. While no religious differences existed between the Anglo-Normans and the Gaels within the kingdom, the cultural difference between the two is reported in accounts from the 17th century which stated that the "Old English" would play tennis after Sunday Mass, whereas the Irish preferred to dance and drink.

The reformation injected another source of friction between the Irish, who remained Catholic, and the English, who became Protestant, in the 16th century. Despite overtures with the Protestant English, East Breifne remained overwhelmingly Catholic, still reflected today in County Cavan, which is 85% Catholic according to the 2011 Census. The nobility of the country never converted, with one possible exception, Sir John O'Reilly's eldest son Maelmora, who was raised in England. He was killed at Yellow Ford in 1598 after being "surrounded by Irish Catholics". Whether this implies he was himself a Protestant is unknown. The religious divide was emphasized in the 17th century. The primary way in which Britain colonized Ulster was through the dispossession of the Catholic Irish and the plantation of Presbyterian Scots and English Anglicans. This provoked the traditionally loyal Old English families and exacerbated religious tension, resulting in further rebellion and the Ulster massacres of the 1640s.

== Clans of East Breifne ==
A topographical poem written by John Ó Dubhagain and Giolla na naomh Ó Huidhrin in the 14th century outlines the major clans that inhabited the Breifne region (both East and West) at that time. Other sources that document the clans within Breifne are Onomasticon Goedelicum, compiled by Edmund Hogan in 1910 and the multitude of references to various clans and their locations that exist in the Irish annals. This list documents those clans that inhabited East Breifne, which was colloquially referred to as Breifne O'Reilly as they were the overlords of the kingdom, but numerous other clans that held distinct territories were also present. The two most distinguished clans of East Breifne, O'Reilly and Brady, are today amongst the most common surnames in County Cavan.

For most of its history East Breifne comprised only central and eastern Cavan. In the early 16th century it obtained suzerainty over the territories that became the baronies of Tullyhaw and Tullyhunco. As the kingdom generally exerted little influence outside of its immediate borders for almost its entire existence, the clans of East Breifne included in this list are those that are specifically recorded as inhabiting the area of modern-day County Cavan, which took its present boundaries in 1579.

- Ó Raghallaigh (O'Reilly, O'Riley, Reilly, Riley, Ryley) hereditary kings of East Breifne, descendants of Uí Briúin Bréifne
- Mac Brádaigh (Brady, MacBrady) the most prominent clan in the kingdom alongside the O'Reilly, found throughout Cavan
- Mac Tighearnain (McTiernan, MacTiernan, McKiernan) chiefs of Teallach Dunchadha - modern day Tullyhunco
- Mac Samhradhain (MacGuaran, McGurran, McGurn, McGovern, Magauran) chiefs of Teallach Eachdhach - modern day Tullyhaw
- Mac Giolladuibh (MacGilduff, Gilduff) chiefs of Teallach Gairbheith - modern day Tullygarvey
- MacGobhain (MacGowan, Smith, Smyth, Smythe, Smeeth, O'Gowan) a military clan originally from Ulaid
- Mac Cába (McCabe) Hiberno-Scottish military clan, for centuries provided mercenaries to Cavan, Monaghan and Fermanagh
- Mac Taichligh (MacTilly) based at Drung in Tullygarvey
- Ó Sioradáin (Sheridan, O'Sheridan) originates in both Longford and Cavan
- Ó Comhraidhe (Curry, Corry, McCorry, Corrie) was a clan based at Cootehill.
- Ó Cléirigh (O'Cleary, Cleary, Clarke) branch of the Ó Cléirighs of Tyrconnell
- Ó Dálaigh (O'Daly, Daly, Daley, Daily, Dailey and Dawley) famous bardic clan found at royal courts throughout Ireland
- Ó Maolagain (Mulligan, O'Mulligan) bards to the O'Reillys
- Mac Shíomóin (Fitzsimons, FitzSimons, Fitzsimmons, FitzSimmons) Anglo-Norman clan that settled in Cavan in the late 14th century
- O Maol Phadraig (Fitzpatrick)
- Ó Faircheallaigh (O'Farrelly, Farrelly, Ferrally, Farily, Fariley) military clan based in Loughtee Lower
- de Lench (Lynch, Linch) clan of Anglo-Norman origin, as opposed to the Gaelic Irish "Ó Loingsigh" which also translates as Lynch
- Mac Giollagain (Gilligan, MacGilligan) originally Scottish clan found throughout Ulster
- Ó Muireadhaigh (Murray, O'Murray) found throughout Cavan
- de Fae (Fay, Fee, Fahy) Anglo-Norman clan that arrived in Ireland in the 12th century
- Mac Mághnais (MacManus), derived from the Norse name Magnus, clan originally from Roscommon

== Kings (Lords) of Breifne O'Reilly ==
Name	Reign	Lineage	Description
Conchobar	1256-1257	son of Cathal	
Matha	1257-1282	son of Domnaill	
Ferghal	1282-1293	son of Domnaill	Killed †
Giolla Iosa Ruaidh	1293- c. 1327	son of Domnaill	Retired (Note: Giolla Iosa Ruaidh retired sometime in the late 1320s (exact date unknown) and his son, Maelseachleann, became king. When Maelseachleann died in 1328 his brother Risdeard became king.)
Maelseachleann	c. 1327-1328	son of Giolla Iosa Ruaidh	
Risdeard	1328-1349	son of Giolla Iosa Ruaidh	
Cu Chonnacht	1349-1365	son of Giolla Iosa Ruaidh	Retired
Pilib	1365-1384	son of Giolla Iosa Ruaidh	
Tomas Mór	1384-1392	son of Mathgamain Ua Raighillaigh	
Seoan	1392-1400	son of Pilib	
Giolla Iosa	1400	son of Pilib	
Maolmhordha	1403-1411	son of Cu Chonnacht	
Risdeard	1411-1418	son of Tomas Mór	
Eoghan na Feosaige	1418-1449	son of Seoan	
Sean an Einigh	1449-1460	son of Eoghan na Feosaige	
Cathal	1460-1467	son of Eoghan na Feosaige	
Toirdhealbhaigh	1467-1487	son of Sean an Einigh	
Seaan	1487-1491	son of Toirdhealbhaigh	
Seaan	1491-1510	son of Cathal	
Aodh	1510-1514	son of Cathal	
Eoghan Ruadh	1514-1526	son of Cathal	
Fearghal	1526-1534	son of Seaan, son of Cathal	Retired
Maolmhordha	1534-1565	son of Seaan, son of Cathal	
Aodh Connallach	1565-1583	son of Maolmhordha, son of Seaan	
John	1583-1596	son of Aodh Connallach	
Pilib	1596	son of Aodh Connallach	Killed †
Eamonn	1596-1601	son of Maolmhordha	
Eoghan	1601-1603	son of Aodh Connallach	Killed †
Maolmhordha	1603-1607	son of Aodh Connallach	

== Bibliography ==
- Simms, Katherine. The O’Reillys and the kingdom of East Breifne. Breifne Journal Vol. V, 1979
- Parker, Kieran. The O’Reillys of East Breifne. Breifne Journal Vol. VII, 1991
- Harriss, Gerald (2005). Shaping the Nation: England, 1360–1461. Oxford: Oxford University Press. ISBN 0-19-822816-3.
- Brady, Ciaran. The O’Reillys and the problem of Surrender and Regrant. Breifne Journal Vol. VI, 1985
- Joyce, Patrick Weston. A Concise History of Ireland. Dublin, 1893
- Lenihan, Padraig. Consolidating Conquest: Ireland 1603-1727. Routeledge, London & New York, 2008
- Connolly, S.J. Contested Island: Ireland 1460-1630. Oxford University Press, 2007
- Hunter, R.J. An Ulster plantation town – Virginia. Breifne Journal Vol. IV, 1970
- Fitzpatrick, Elizabeth. Royal Inauguration in Gaelic Ireland C. 1100-1600: A Cultural Landscape Study. The Boydell Press, 2004
- Dolley, Michael & Seaby, W.A. Le Money Del ORaylly 1967
- Cherry, Jonathan. The indigenous and colonial urbanization of Cavan town.
- Gallogy, Dan. Brian Oge O'Rourke and the Nine Years War. Breifne Journal Vol. V
- Perceval-Maxwell, M. Outbreak of the Irish Rebellion of 1641 McGill-Queen's University Press, 1994
- Margey, Annaleigh. Surveying and Mapping Plantation in Cavan, c.1580-1622
