= Robert Fitzsimmons (disambiguation) =

Bob Fitzsimmons (1863–1917) was a British boxer and first three-division champion.

Robert or Bob Fitzsimmons may also refer to:

- Rocky Fitzsimmons (born 1979), American attorney and politician
- Bob Fitzsimmons (footballer) (1917–1998), Australian rules footballer
