= Corrie (surname) =

- Gender: Unisex
- Language: English

Origin
- Language: English
- Origin: 1. Corrie, Arran; 2. Corrie, Dumfries; 3. variant of Corry and McCorry

Other names
- Variant forms: Corry, McCorry

Corrie is a surname in the English language. The name has several different etymological origins. The name is found in numbers in the north of Ireland. The surname has been borne by a noted Scottish family, that was originally seated in what is today the civil parish of Hutton and Corrie.

== Etymology ==
In some cases the surname originated as a habitational name, derived from several different locations named Corrie. For example, the surnames are derived from the places so-named on the Isle of Arran, and in Dumfries (both of which are located in Scotland). The place names are derived from the Gaelic coire, meaning "cauldron", which was used in place names to describe a circular valley on the side of a mountain.

Another origin of the surname is from a variation of the surnames Corry and McCorry, which are common in the north of Ireland. These particular surnames are derived from the Irish Mac Gothraidh, meaning "son of Gothradh".

== Distribution ==
In Ireland, the surname is rare, although it is found in numbers in Belfast and Derry. The surname, when found in Ireland, can originate as either the northern Irish patronym, or from any of the Scottish toponyms.

== Families ==
The name has been borne by a notable Scottish family, the Corrie family, that was seated in Dumfries. The family derived its surname from the toponym in Dumfries, which is located in what is now the civil parish of Hutton and Corrie. The leading branch of the family were known as the Corries of that Ilk.

== People with the surname ==
- Anthony Corrie (born 1984), Australian rules footballer
- Christina Jane Corrie (1867–1937), Australian suffragist, founded the Queensland Women's Electoral League
- Daniel Corrie (1777–1837), English Bishop of Madras
- Edward Corrie (disambiguation), multiple persons
- Edward Corrie (born 1988), British tennis player
- Emily Corrie (born 1978), British actress
- Eoghan Corry (born 1961), Irish journalist and travel writer
- George Corrie (footballer) (born 1973), English footballer in the USA
- Heather Corrie (born 1971), British–American canoeist
- Joe Corrie, (1894–1968), Scottish miner, poet and playwright
- John Corrie, (born 1935), Scottish former Conservative MP and MEP
- Miaoux Miaoux (born 1985; real name Julian Victor Corrie), music producer and musician
- Rachel Corrie, (1979–2003), American ISM volunteer killed by an Israeli bulldozer in the Gaza Strip
- Will Corrie, British actor of the silent movie era
