= Allan Fitzsimmons =

Allan K. Fitzsimmons was the Wildlands Fuel Coordinator at the United States Department of the Interior. This position coordinates and implements fuels treatment on lands managed by the Bureau of Indian Affairs, Bureau of Land Management, Fish and Wildlife Service and the National Park Service.

== Career ==
From 1983 to 1985, Fitzsimmons served as a special assistant to the Deputy Director of the National Park Service. From 1985 to 1989, he was the special assistant to the assistant Secretary for Fish and Wildlife and Parks and from 1989 to 1992, the special assistant to the Deputy Under Secretary for Policy, Planning and Development at the Department of Energy.

== Philosophical and political views ==
Fitzsimmons’ views regarding ecosystem management, specifically endangered species, have created some controversy among environmentalists, such as Friends of the Earth. In his 1999 book Defending Illusions: Federal Protection of Ecosystems, he renounces the existence of ecosystems, claiming they are merely “mental constructs.” Interior Secretary Gale Norton, who appointed Fitzsimmons to the Fuel Coordinator position, stated that he feels confident that Fitzsimmons has a “wide range” of experience with environmental issues.
