= Shane Fitzsimmons (footballer) =

Australian rules footballer

Personal information
- Full name: Shane Fitzsimmons
- Born: 24 December 1955 (age 70)
- Original team: Kyabram
- Height: 182 cm (6 ft 0 in)
- Weight: 76 kg (168 lb)

Playing career^{1}
Years	Club	Games (Goals)
1973–1979	Melbourne	63 (33)
1979–1983	West Perth	92
- ^{1} Playing statistics correct to the end of 1983.

Shane Fitzsimmons (born 24 December 1955) is a former Australian rules footballer who played with Melbourne in the Victorian Football League (VFL) during the 1970s. He also played for West Perth in the West Australian Football League (WAFL).

Fitzsimmons was just 17 years old when he made his Melbourne debut, having come to the club from Kyabram. He spent much of his time in the VFL as a half forward flanker and despite playing 14 games in his first season, made only 30 appearances over the next four years. In 1978 he finally put together regular games and was sixth in Melbourne's Keith Truscott Medal count, after playing a total of 17 matches and averaging 15 disposals for the year.

Although he appeared in the opening two rounds of the 1979 VFL season, Fitzsimmons finished the football season in Western Australia, with West Perth. Used mostly across half back, he was West Perth's "Best and Fairest" winner in 1980.
