= William Fitzsimmons =

William Fitzsimmons may refer to:

- William Fitzsimmons (Canadian politician) (1818–1894)
- William Fitzsimmons (Northern Ireland politician) (1909–1992), in Northern Ireland
- William Fitzsimmons (musician) (born 1978), American singer-songwriter

== See also ==
- William FitzSimons (1870–1926), Irish-born Australian politician
- William T. Fitzsimons (1889–1917), a U.S. Army officer
