= Edward Corrie =

Edward Corrie may refer to:

- Edward Corrie (rower) (1848–1931), English rower
- Edward Corrie (tennis) (born 1988), English tennis player
