= Finn McCools Fingers =

Standing Stones in Ireland

Coordinates: 54.017461°N 7.291406°W

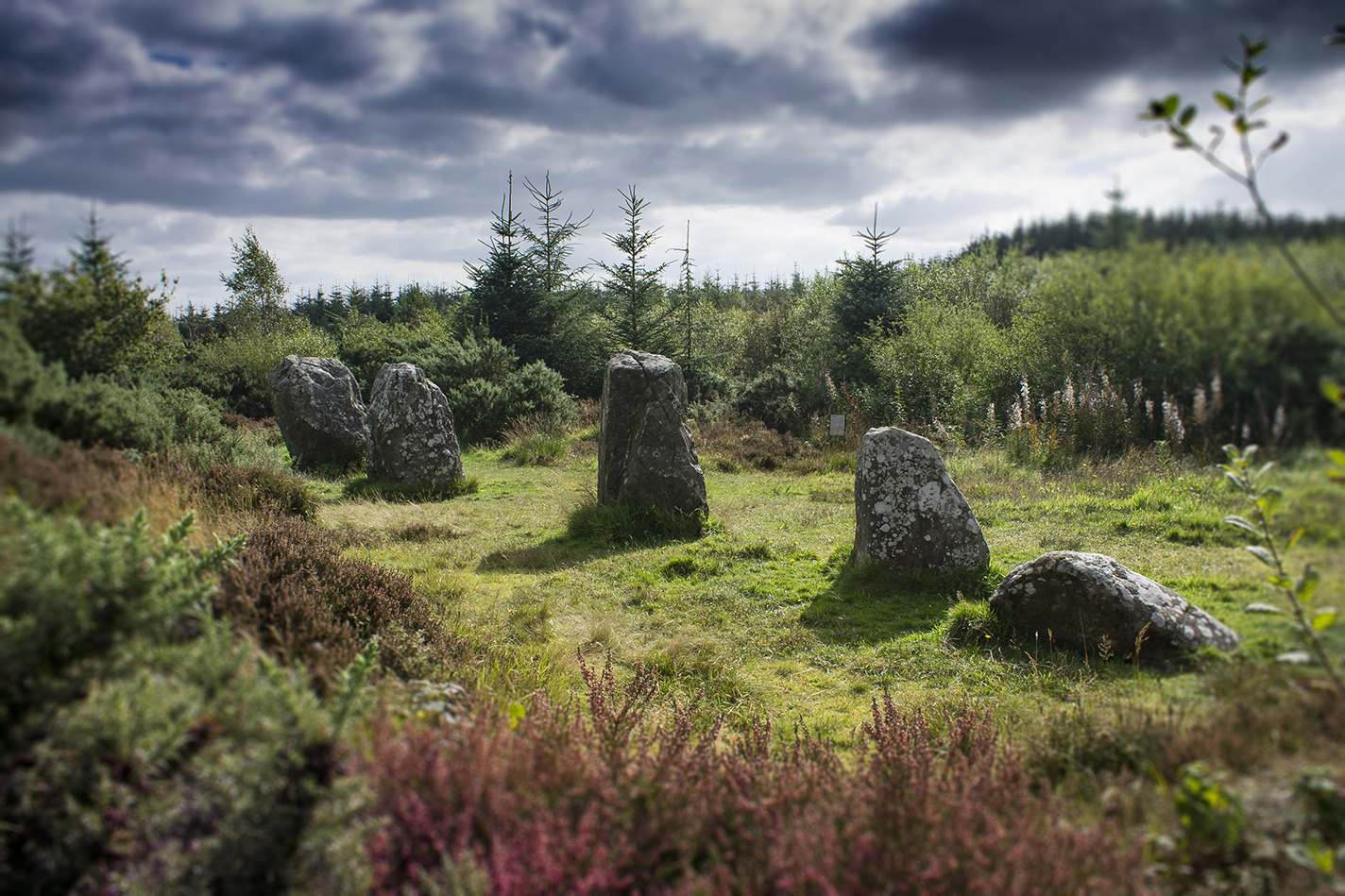
Finn McCools Fingers

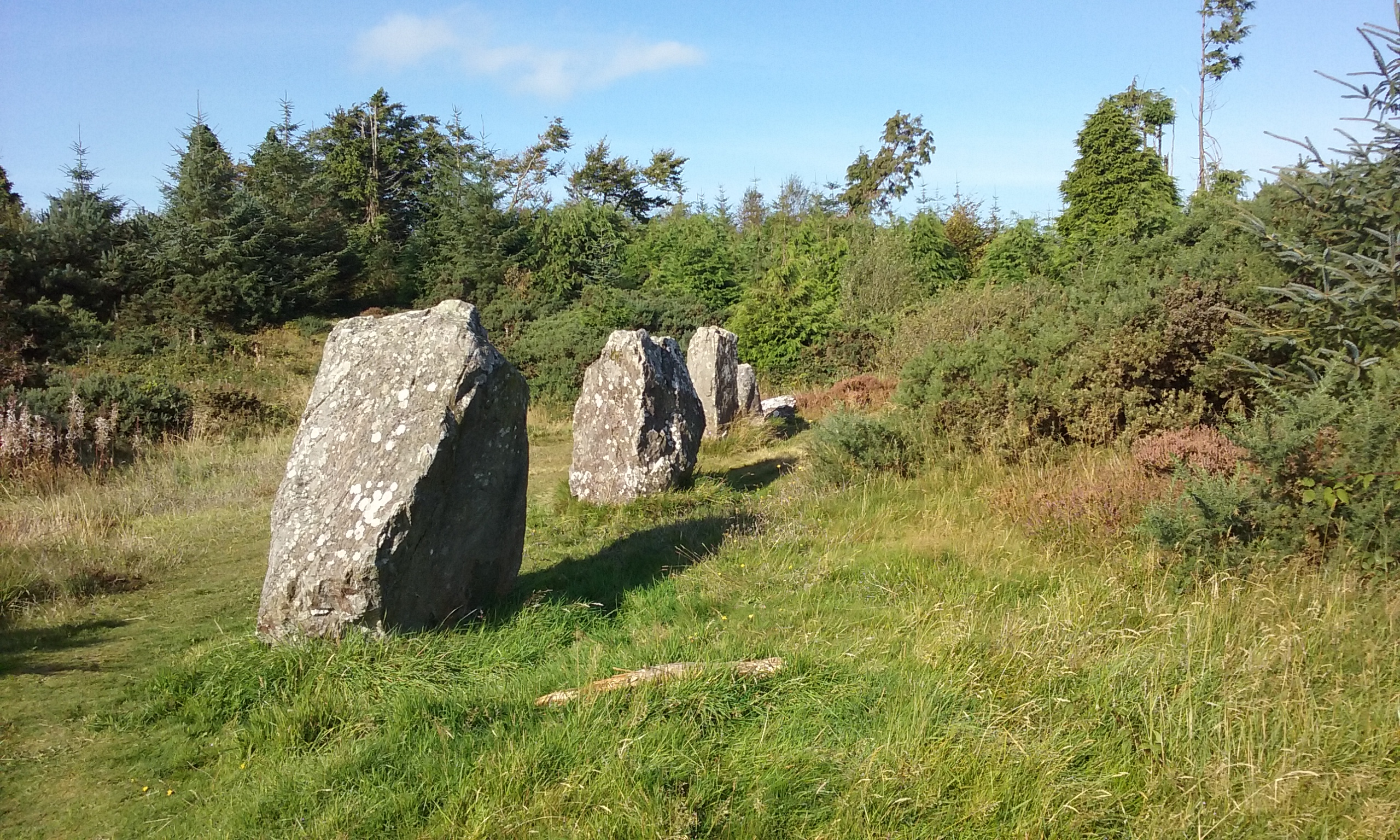

Finn McCools Fingers (or "Shantemon Stone Row") are a set of five standing stones on Shantemon mountain in County Cavan. The name is derived from the story that giant Celtic warrior Fionn mac Cumhaill lost a hand in battle. The stones are arranged in a south-east/north-west orientation.
