= Gerry Fitzsimons =

British businessman (1959–2007)

- Born: 28 August 1959; Crowthorne, England
- Died: November 22, 2007 (aged 48); United Kingdom
- Occupation: CEO
- Employer: TTP Ventures

Gerry Fitzsimons (28 August 1959—22 November 2007) was a British businessman, chief executive of TTP Ventures, a director of TeraView, Oxford Diffraction and TTP Group plc. He was Cambridge Network's first company secretary.

== Career ==
With a degree in jurisprudence from Oxford University, he left University College in 1981. After the College of Law in Guildford, he joined Clifford Chance in 1982 and qualified as a solicitor in 1984. After qualification he spent time at Clifford Chance—now the world's largest law firm—and with the leading New York law firm of Shearman & Sterling.

In 1987, Gerry moved to Taylor Vinters in Cambridge where he remained until 1996, when he started up the Cambridge Garretts office alongside Arthur Andersen. He was managing partner of the Cambridge office of Andersen Legal until 2002 when its global offices were hit by the fall-out at Arthur Andersen following the Enron scandal and the firm was closed down.

Gerry then took up the chief executive role at TTP Ventures with his familiar passion. He had been external legal counsel to TTP Group since it was formed and to the fund. He was also a director of TeraView, Oxford Diffraction and TTP Group plc.

Gerry had extensive experience of negotiating and structuring private equity transactions and exits. As a top corporate lawyer with a particular focus on the technology sector, he undertook a large number of private equity transactions – both for investee companies and funds. The major legal profession guides all rated him "an outstanding rainmaker.”

His significant transactions included the October 2000 IPO of TTP Communications plc, the December 2000 merger of The Astron Group Limited and Tactica Group plc and the merger of Dalehead Foods Limited and Roche Foods Limited in September 1999.

His regular venture capital clients had included Technomark and Lloyds Development Capital, Amadeus Capital Partners Limited, First Cambridge Gateway and TTP Ventures.

== Death ==
Gerry Fitzsimons died aged 47 following a lengthy battle against lung cancer.
