= George Fitzsimmons (serial killer) =

Convicted American serial killer

- Born: George Kearon Joseph Fitzsimmons; May 7, 1936; Cleveland, Ohio, U.S.
- Died: October 1999 (aged 63); State Correctional Institution – Dallas, Jackson Township, Pennsylvania, U.S.
- Other names: "The Karate Chop Killer" "The Buffalo Ripper"
- Conviction: First degree murder (2 counts)
- Penalty: Life imprisonment

Details
- Victims: 4
- Span of crimes: 1969–1973
- Country: United States
- States: New York, Pennsylvania
- Date apprehended: November 18, 1973

George Kearon Joseph Fitzsimmons (May 7, 1936 – 1999), known as The Karate Chop Killer, was an American serial killer convicted of killing his uncle and aunt in Roulette, Pennsylvania in 1973, after being previously deemed insane for the 1969 murders of his parents in Eggertsville, New York. At Fitzsimmons' subsequent trial, in which he was represented by famous attorney F. Lee Bailey, he was convicted and sentenced to life imprisonment, which he served until his death in 1999.

== Early life ==
George Kearon Joseph Fitzsimmons was born in 1936 in Cleveland, Ohio, the only child of William and Pearl Fitzsimmons (née Tate). Little is known about his childhood and upbringing, aside from dropping out of college during his teens. Shortly thereafter, Fitzsimmons joined the Army and was stationed in Korea, where he took a keen interest in learning and practicing karate. However, at the same time, he developed an addiction to amphetamines, which led him to occasionally become violent, have mental breakdowns or suffer auditory hallucinations.

In an attempt to improve his condition, Fitzsimmons' parents sent him to the Buffalo State Hospital, where he remained for an undetermined amount of time before being released. After his release, he worked for some time as a lifeguard at a local YMCA, but eventually quit and moved back in at his parents' apartment in Eggertsville, New York, where he became known by locals for his expertise in karate and his love for weightlifting.

== Parricide ==
On January 12, 1969, Fitzsimmons got into an argument with his parents over attending church, causing him to fly into a rage and bludgeon both of them using a souvenir tomahawk and karate chops. He then stole one of his father's cars and fled to Attleboro, Massachusetts, where he stayed at a motel until his parents' bodies were discovered by concerned neighbors on January 21. He then left the state, intending to travel either towards Chicago or Arizona, but first stopped in Altamont, Illinois, where he wrote a telegram to a bank in Buffalo, asking that money be transferred into his bank account. As the employees had already been notified that a warrant was issued for his arrest, they notified the police, who subsequently apprehended Fitzsimmons.

After he was extradited back to New York, he was charged with two counts of murder, after presiding Justice Edward Robinson denied his attorneys' requests that the charges be reduced to manslaughter. At his subsequent trial, however, he was ruled a paranoid schizophrenic by the judge and ordered to be interned at the Buffalo State Hospital, thus acquitting him of murder charges. This decision caused further controversy when it was announced that he could be legally eligible to inherit his parents' $123,000 estate, as he was technically considered innocent under the law.

== Release, move to Pennsylvania and new murders ==
After spending less than three years in psychiatric care, a panel of doctors declared that Fitzsimmons "no longer posed a danger to society" due to his exemplary behavior, and released him. Shortly afterwards, he and his wife Beverly, whom he had met in the mental hospital, moved to a house in Coudersport, Pennsylvania. Mere weeks later, Fitzsimmons beat up his wife so severely that she had to be hospitalized, but was only convicted of simple assault since she did not want to press charges against him.

After a failed attempt by his lawyer to persuade him to go back to the mental hospital, Fitzsimmons moved in with his aunt and uncle, Euphresia and DeAlton Nichols, both 80, in Roulette, Pennsylvania. With each passing day, his paranoid delusions grew worse and worse, with him eventually coming to the conclusion that his aunt and uncle were trying to poison him by lacing his food with arsenic. Angered, he confronted them both and an argument ensued, causing Fitzsimmons to grab a hunting knife and stab DeAlton twice in the heart. He then turned towards Euphresia, whom he cornered in the kitchen and stabbed to death. He then got into their car and drove to a sandwich shop in Buffalo, where he called his lawyer and told him what had happened, saying that he wanted to go back to the Buffalo State Hospital. He then sat on the curb and waited for police to take him in.

== Trial, imprisonment and death ==
Two days after his arrest, Fitzsimmons, who was held without bail, was officially charged with the Nicholses' murders by a grand jury. Shortly after his arrest, his wife officially filed for divorce, in addition to a lawsuit for battery. Using his inheritance money, Fitzsimmons hired famed lawyer F. Lee Bailey as his attorney, with one of his first actions being a request for a change of venue to a larger metropolitan area such as Erie or Pittsburgh. This request was granted, and the trial location was moved to Greensburg.

At the trial itself, psychiatrists were called on both the defense and prosecution's side to testify their findings. While it was supposed that Bailey's defense team would proceed with an insanity defense, this was temporarily hampered by Fitzsimmons himself, who claimed that he was not mentally ill and that at the time of the murders, he was supposedly out on a walk. The latter claim was disputed by a tape-recorded interview with Buffalo police officers on the day of his arrest, in which he explicitly said that he had just killed his aunt and uncle. The case also drew attention due to the actions of his attorney, who left mixed impressions on the jurors for a variety of reasons.

Despite Bailey's efforts to convince the jurors that his client was insane, Fitzsimmons was found guilty, convicted and subsequently sentenced to two life terms. He was interned at the medium-security State Correctional Institution – Dallas in Jackson Township, where he initially proved to be a problematic inmate, but over the years, he became a recluse who often muttered to himself. Fitzsimmons spent the remainder of his life at the institution, and died of cancer in 1999. Decades after his death, Bailey, who by then worked as a law consultant in Maine, discussed the case with EndeavorNews, revealing that he had feared for his life when he interacted with his client.

== See also ==
- List of serial killers in the United States
- List of familicides

== Bibliography ==
- Gerhard and Clifford Falk (1990). Murder, an Analysis of Its Forms, Conditions, and Causes. McFarland. p. 10. ISBN 0899504787.
- Charles Patrick Ewing (April 7, 2008). Insanity: Murder, Madness, and the Law. Oxford University Press. pp. 11–16. ISBN 978-0198043690.
