= Bob Fitzsimmons (footballer) =

Australian rules footballer, born 1917

Personal information
- Full name: Robert Stanley Fitzsimmons
- Born: 16 April 1917
- Died: 21 April 1998 (aged 81)
- Original team: Burnley Juniors
- Height: 175 cm (5 ft 9 in)
- Weight: 70 kg (154 lb)

Playing career^{1}
Years	Club	Games (Goals)
1936–37	Fitzroy	7 (1)
1939–41	St Kilda	12 (2)
Total		19 (3)
- ^{1} Playing statistics correct to the end of 1941.

Robert Stanley Fitzsimmons (16 April 1917 – 21 April 1998) was an Australian rules footballer who played for Fitzroy and St Kilda in the Victorian Football League (VFL).
