= McCorry =

McCorry is a surname. Notable people with the surname include:

- Bill McCorry (1887–1973), American baseball player
