= List of historic properties in Prescott, Arizona =

- City
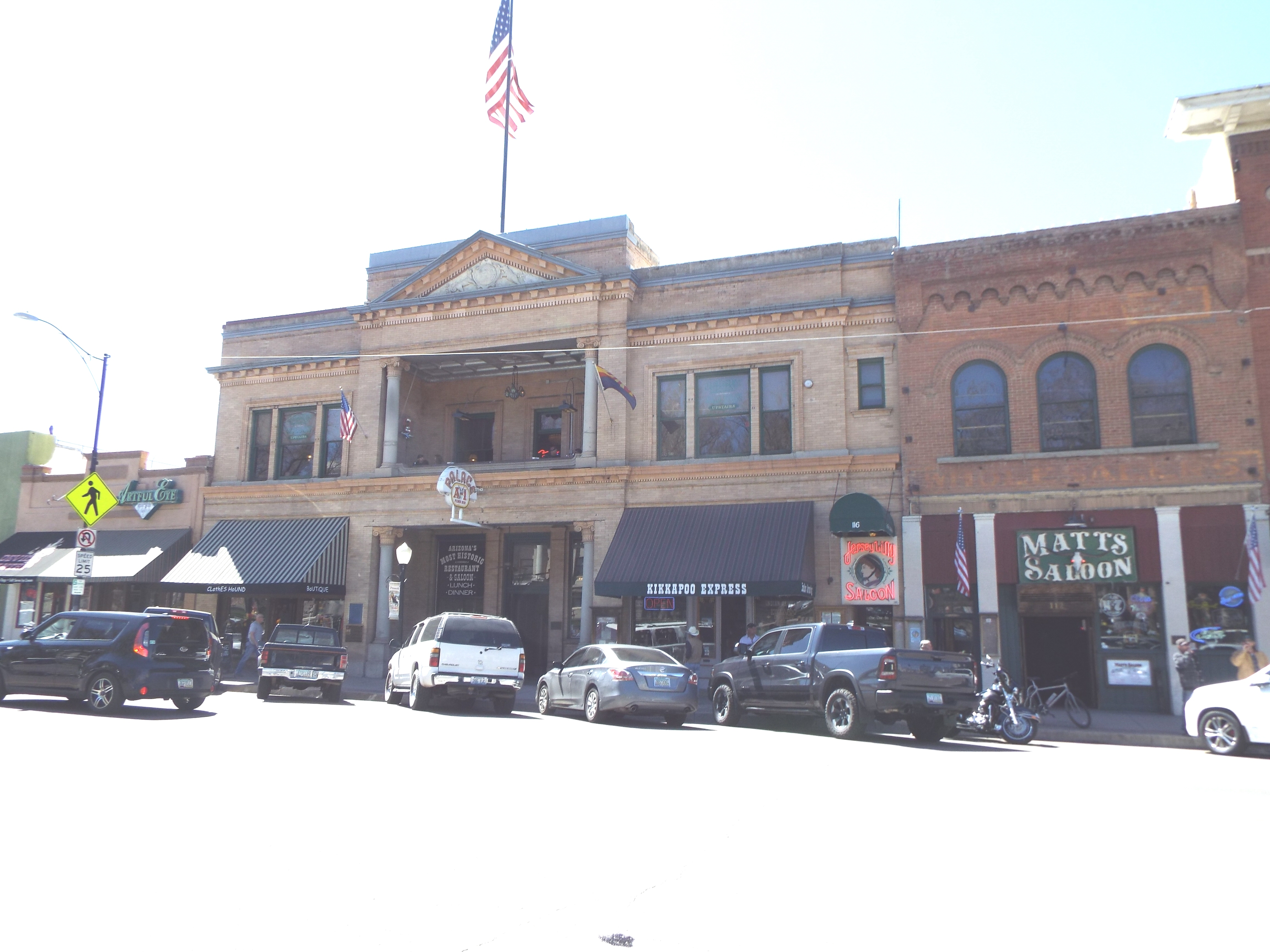
- Whiskey Row

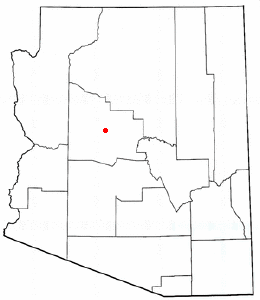
- Location of Prescott in Yavapai County, Arizona.

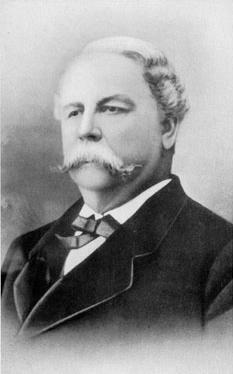
John Noble Goodwin, First Territorial Governor

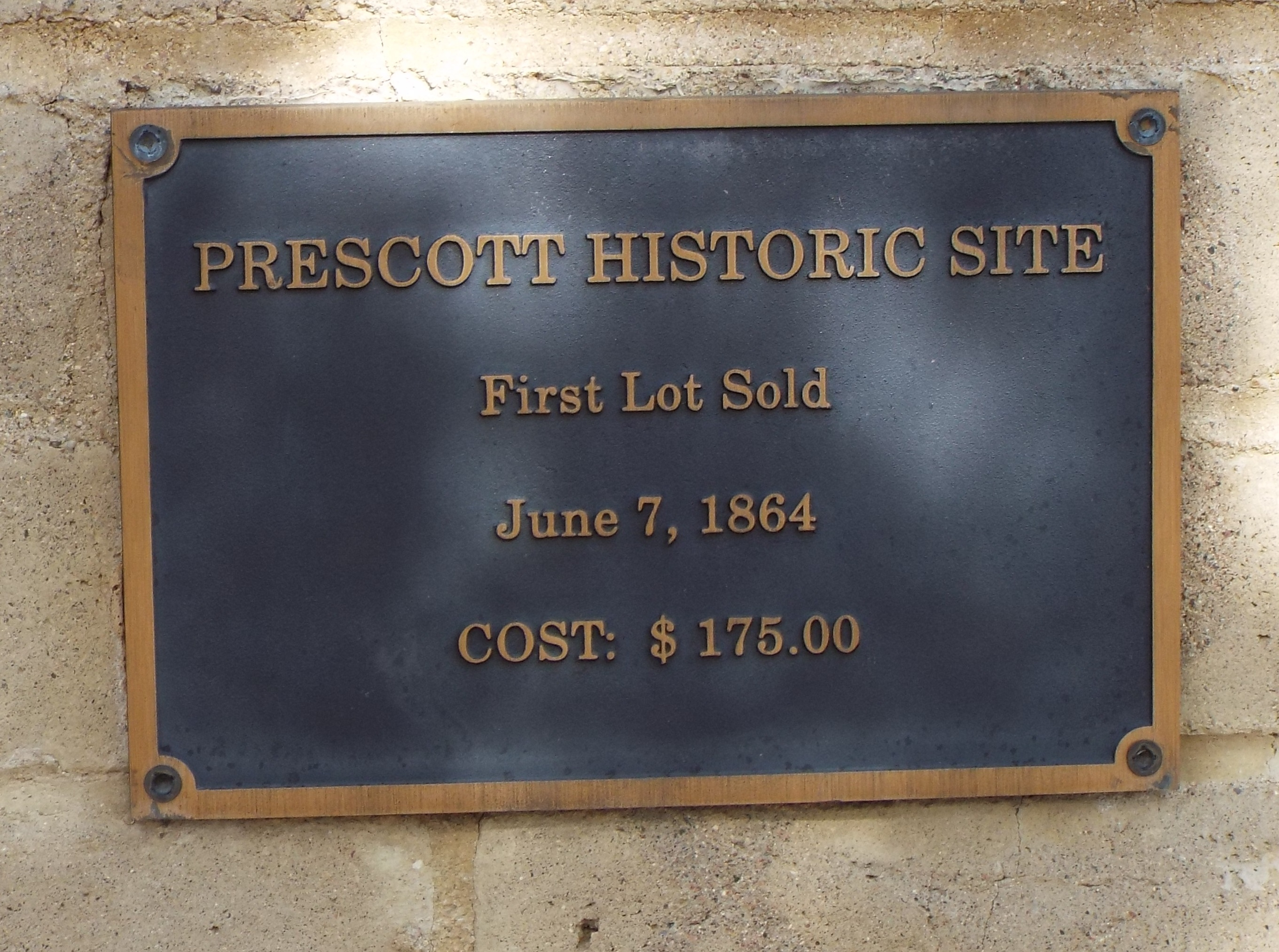
First Lot Sold-June 7, 1864

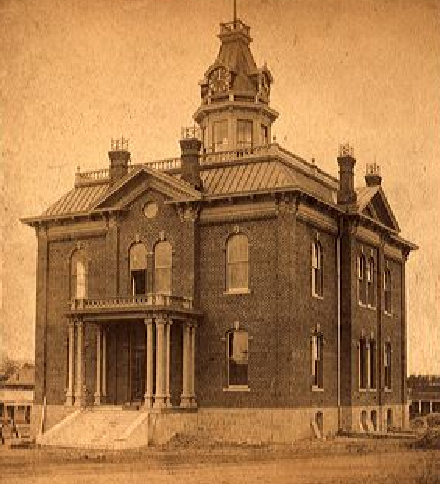
First Prescott Courthouse, circa 1885

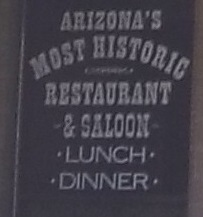
Palace Hotel window sign

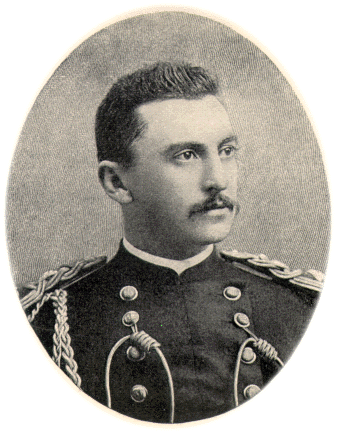
Captain William "Buckey" O'Neill

This is a list of historic properties in Prescott, Arizona, which includes a photographic gallery of its remaining historic structures and monuments. The city is the county seat of Yavapai County. In 1864 Prescott was designated as the capital of the Arizona Territory, replacing the temporary capital at Fort Whipple. The Territorial Capital was moved to Tucson in 1867. Prescott again became the Territorial Capital in 1877, until Phoenix became the capital in 1889.

Included in this list are photographs of some of the structures within the Downtown Historic Preservation District (which includes "Whiskey Row"), the Courthouse Plaza Historic District, the Fort Whipple-Department of Veterans Affairs Medical Center Historic District and the Sharlot Hall Museum.

== Brief history ==
The first known Native-American people to have settled the Prescott area are the Yavapai. The name Yavapai comes from a combination of the words Enyaleva (sun) and pai (people). Some anthropologists trace the Yavapai, also known as the “People of the Sun”, to groups who migrated from the Colorado River regions around 1,300 AD. The Yavapai were mainly hunter-gatherers, following an annual round, migrating to different areas to follow the ripening of different edible plants and movement of game.

The US military incursions into Yavapai territory greatly increased following the declaration of war against Mexico in May 1845 and especially after the claim by the US of southwest lands under the Treaty of Guadalupe-Hidalgo, When gold was discovered in California in 1849, emigrants of European descent from the East Coast began to travel to the southwest and passed through Yavapai territory more than they had ever done so before. Despite the thousands of emigrants passing through their territory, the Yavapai avoided contact with them. However, settlers began moving onto the lands of the Yavapai in the 1820s, and before long had greatly diminished the Yavapai's game and agricultural lands. The Yavapai openly resisted and many were slaughtered.

The town-site of Prescott was officially founded in 1864, as the Territorial Capital of Arizona. The secretary of Arizona Territory, Richard Cunningham McCormick, urged that it be named for the historian William H. Prescott, whose books on the conquest of Mexico and Peru McCormick admired. William Hickling Prescott was an American historian and author. He has been called America's first scientific historian. Prescott's entitlement as capital was sealed by one vote over La Paz by the first legislature. John Noble Goodwin was appointed Territorial Governor by President Abraham Lincoln. He served as such from December 29, 1863, to March 4, 1865. On June 7, 1864, the first lot in Prescott was sold for $175.00. The site where Prescott's City Hall is located in what is now 201 South Cortez Street was declared historical by the Prescott Historical Society.

Fort Whipple was a tactical base for the United States Cavalry during the Indian Wars of 1864–1882. The fort was named after Lt. Amiel Whipple who was the first to discover and establish access to gold fields nearby. This new gold created conflict in the area and Fort Whipple was used to protect miners and settlers from raids. Beginning in 1865, after the American Civil War, the Yavapai were forced to live in reservations when gold was discovered in their territory. The fort was for a short period of time the capital of the Arizona Territory.

Prescott was incorporated in 1883, obtaining legal title to a town site originally established without regard for federal law replacing the temporary capital at Fort Whipple. At the same time Prescott was established as the Territorial Capital, it was also designated as the County Seat of Yavapai County, one of four original territorial counties.

Prescott served as the Territorial Capital until 1889, with the exception of the years of 1867–77, when the capital was moved to Tucson. On November 1, 1867, the capital was moved to Tucson by the act of the 4th Arizona Territorial Legislature. The capital returned to Prescott in 1877 by the 9th Arizona Territorial Legislature. The capital was finally moved to Phoenix on February 4, 1889, by the 15th Arizona Territorial Legislature.

Richard Cunningham McCormick was appointed Territorial Governor by President Andrew Johnson on July 9, 1866. He served as such until March 4, 1869. Both governors had at one time or another resided in the Governor's Mansion which is now one of the historic structures exhibited on the grounds of the Sharlot Hall Museum.

By 1878, Prescott had a street known as "Whiskey Row" which was known for the establishment of many saloons, gambling parlors, opium dens and houses of prostitution. Two fires affected most of the structures on the street, but none came close to causing the damage which was done in the fire of July 14, 1900. The fire known as "The Great Fire" destroyed five city blocks including most of Whiskey Row. Twelve hotels and 20 mercantile establishments were lost.

After the fire, citizens soon viewed the event as a chance to replace the old wooden buildings common in the downtown area with more permanent concrete, brick and stone buildings. By 1901, the buildings in the district had been rebuilt. The original buildings which still are standing are the Hotel Palace, the D. Levy Mercantile Building and the St. Michael Hotel. Whiskey Row continued to be the center of activity for the town, known for its gambling as well as its saloons.

In 1888, William "Buckey" O'Neill, who was serving as Yavapai County judge, was elected county sheriff, running on the Republican ticket. After his term was up, O'Neill was elected unanimously Mayor of Prescott. In 1898, war broke out between the United States and Spain. O'Neill joined the Rough Riders and became Captain of Troop A. On July 1, 1898, the Rough Riders and the 10th Cavalry were stationed below Kettle Hill. The Spaniards, who were on top of the hill, poured machine gun and Mauser fire down on the Americans. Buckey O'Neill was killed in action.

By 1895, the Santa Fe, Prescott and Phoenix Railroad (also known as the “Peavine”) connected Prescott's mining area with the Southern Pacific line. The access to the railroad bolstered the mercantile sector of the local economy and led to the establishment of several new dry goods and mining supply businesses. Communication and utilities improved along with transportation. An electric light plant was built in 1889 and telephones arrived shortly thereafter. The year 1889 also marked the year that the capital was moved to Phoenix. In spite of this political loss, Prescott continued to prosper and develop as the 19th century drew to a close.

The copper-mining industry also supported area growth in the early 20th century because of the extra demands for World War I. However, by 1919 Prescott suffered the effects of postwar depression along with the rest of the state and nation.

== Prescott Historical Society ==
Some of the structures in Prescott are listed in the National Register of Historic Places. The fact that a property is listed in the National Register of Historic Places or that it may be eligible to be listed as such, does not mean that the property is safe from being demolished by its owner or from being removed from the NRHP listings. An example is the Goldwater Mercantile Building which was listed in 1978, reference #78003584 and removed from the list on October 2, 1992, because the historic structure was demolished in November 1978. According to Jim McPherson, Arizona Preservation Foundation Board President:

"It is crucial that residents, private interests, and government officials act now to save these elements of our cultural heritage before it is too late."

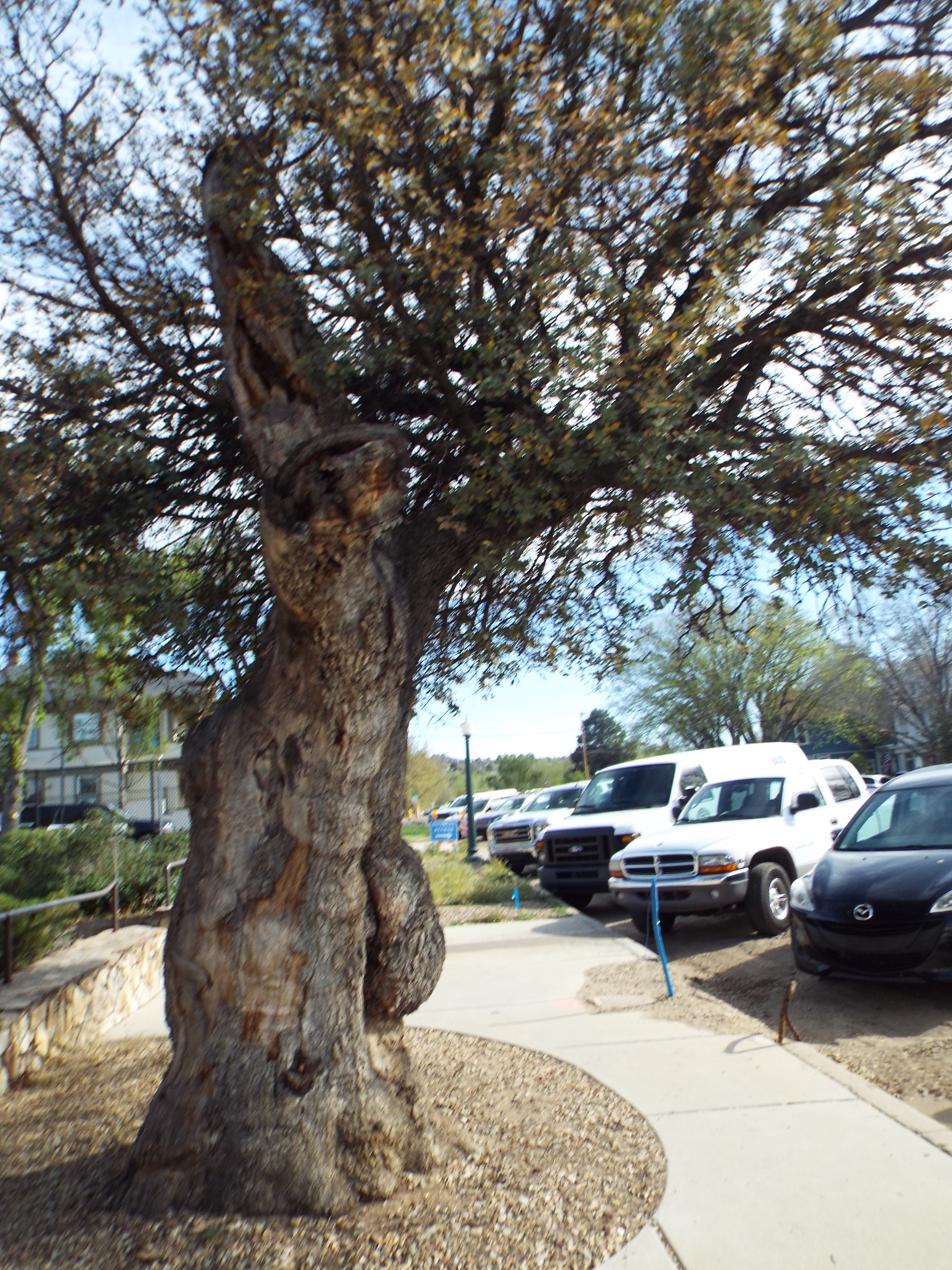
Historic Centennial Tree

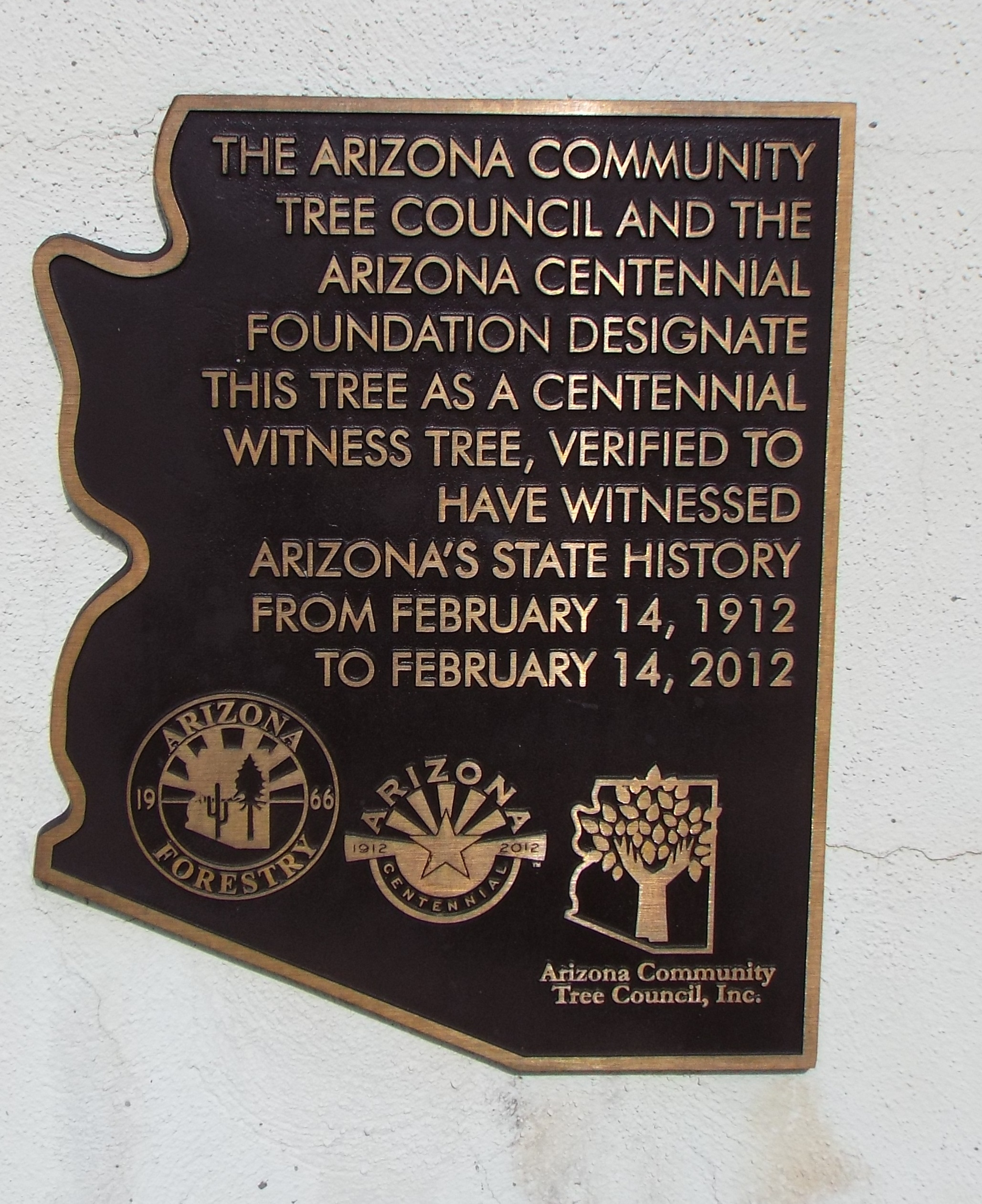
Historic Centennial Tree dedication

According to The Prescott Historical Society web-page, the society was established as a state agency in 1964 to operate the Sharlot Hall museum and territorial gubernatorial mansion. The Society and its Board of Trustees also maintains historical collections and makes the collections, materials and data available to the public. The Society is supported by state and private funds. The Society is authorized to purchase, receive, hold, lease and sell property for the benefit of the state and the use of the Society.

Chapter 3-11 of the City Code created an official listing of historic buildings and structures located within the city to known as "The City of Prescott Register of Historic Places". The purpose is to establish an official list of buildings and structures to which the provisions of the Prescott Historic Building Code, as adopted in Title III, Chapter 8, of the City Code may be applied. The City of Prescott Register of Historic Places includes all buildings and structures which are presently listed or that may be in the future listed on the following:

1. The National Register of Historic Places.
2. The State of Arizona Register of Historic Places.
3. The Territorial Architecture of Prescott, 1978 edition, compiled and edited by Billy Garrett and published by the Yavapai Heritage Foundation.
4. A Prescott Preservation District.

Any buildings and structures located within the City limits of Prescott, Arizona, and not otherwise listed under Section 3-11-3 may be included on the official list upon a showing that such buildings and structures have:

1. Historical or cultural importance, and/or
2. Distinctive architectural style, engineering, or workmanship, and/or
3. Visual and aesthetic value as part of the scene, neighborhood, or district.

In the Prescott area there are some ruins associated with the Sinagua tribe which was listed in the National Register of Historic Places on January 20, 1989, reference #88003185. Listed as Indian Peak Ruin (AR-03-09-06-116). The ruins are not pictured in this article because access to the area is restricted.

== Historic properties ==
=== Historic Districts ===
The following twelve districts are considered historical by the National Register of Historic Places:

- Courthouse Plaza Historic District – Location: Roughly bounded by Gurley, Montezuma, Cortez, and Goodwin Sts. Listed in the National Register of Historic Places on December 14, 1978, reference #78003583
- East Prescott Historic District – Location: Roughly bounded by Atchison, Topeka, and Santa Fe railroad tracks, N. Mt. Vernon St., Carleton St., and N. Alarcon St. Listed in the National Register of Historic Places on October 2, 1989, reference #89000165
- Fleury's Addition Historic District – Location: Roughly Western and Gurley from Willow to Grove, and Willow, Garden, and Grove from Western to Gurley St. Listed in the National Register of Historic Places on December 27, 1994, reference #94001488
- Hassayampa Historic District – Location: 1089–1112 Old Hassayampa Ln. and 1106 Country Club Dr. Listed in the National Register of Historic Places on May 30, 2003, reference #03000469
- Joslin and Whipple Historic District – Location: S. Mt. Vernon, Virginia, Washington, and Arizona Sts. Listed in the National Register of Historic Places on December 7, 2000, reference #00001387
- Mile High Park Historic District – Location: Roughly along Oregon Ave. and Josephine St. from Gail Gardner Way and Lindberg Dr. Listed in the National Register of Historic Places on September 3, 1999, reference #99001069
- North Prescott Townsite Historic District – Location: Between Gurley, Sheldon, Alarcon and Summit Sts. Listed in the National Register of Historic Places on May 13, 2009, reference #08001188
- Pine Crest Historic District – Location: Roughly bounded by San Carlos St., Coronado Ave., and Yavapai, Apache, and Mohave Drs. Listed in the National Register of Historic Places on August 10, 1989, reference #89001074
- Prescott Armory Historic District – Location: Roughly bounded by E. Gurley, E. Willis, N. Arizona, E. Sheldon, and N. Rush Sts. Listed in the National Register of Historic Places on August 15, 1994, reference #94000829
- South Prescott Townsite – Location: Roughly bounded by Alarcon, Montezuma, Union, and Leroux Sts. Listed in the National Register of Historic Places on August 31, 1998, reference #97000859
- West Prescott Historic District – Location: Roughly bounded by Gurley Dr., Park Ave., Country Club Dr., Vista Dr., and Coronado Ave.; also 617–621 Glenwood Ave. and 330, 334, 340, 344, and 348 Moreland Circle Listed in the National Register of Historic Places on August 10, 1989, reference #89001075
- Whipple Heights Historic District – Location: E. Gurley, N. Virginia, Washington, and E. Moeller Sts. Listed in the National Register of Historic Places on December 7, 2000, reference #00001388
Historic Districts
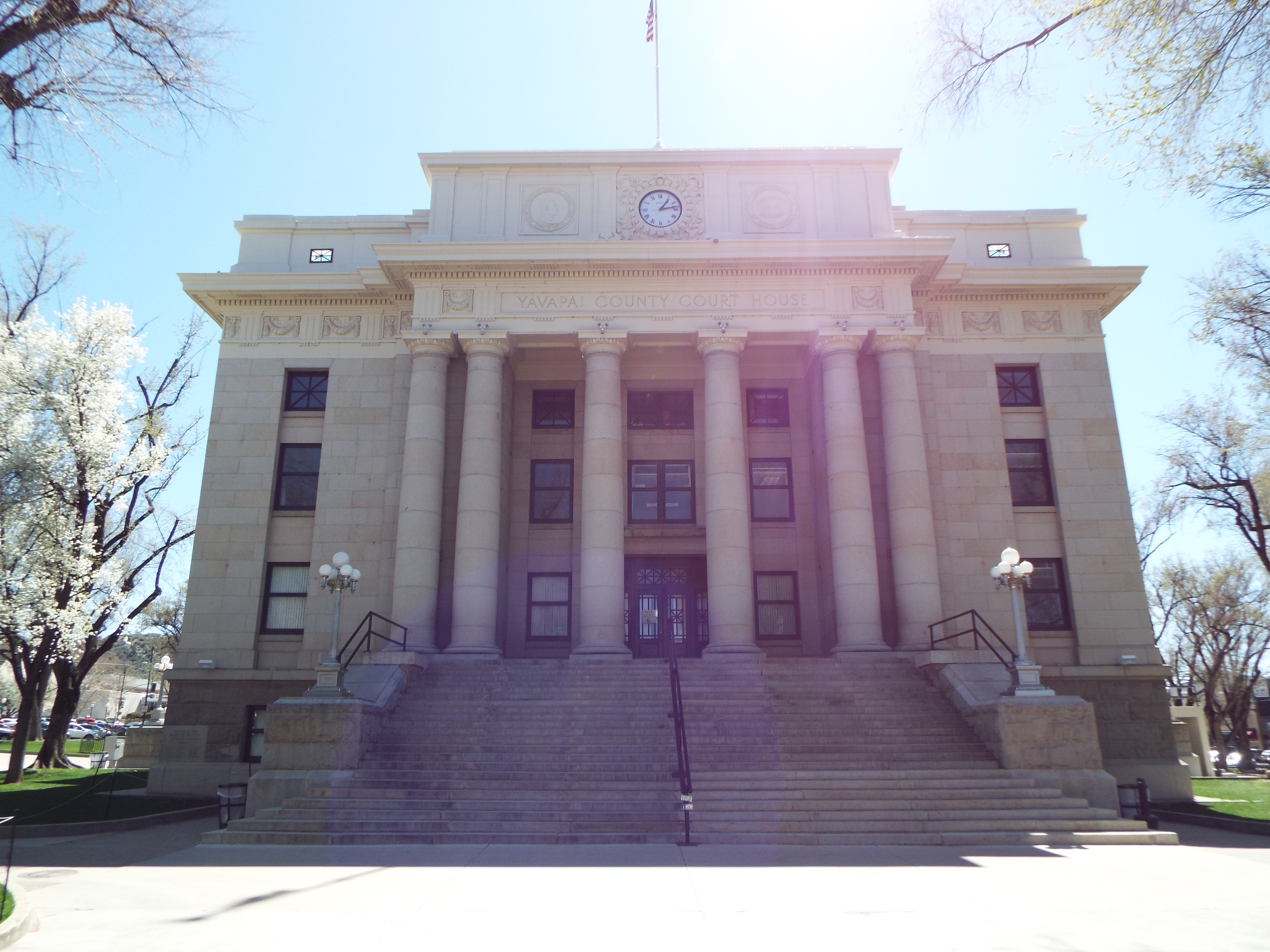
Courthouse Plaza Historic District

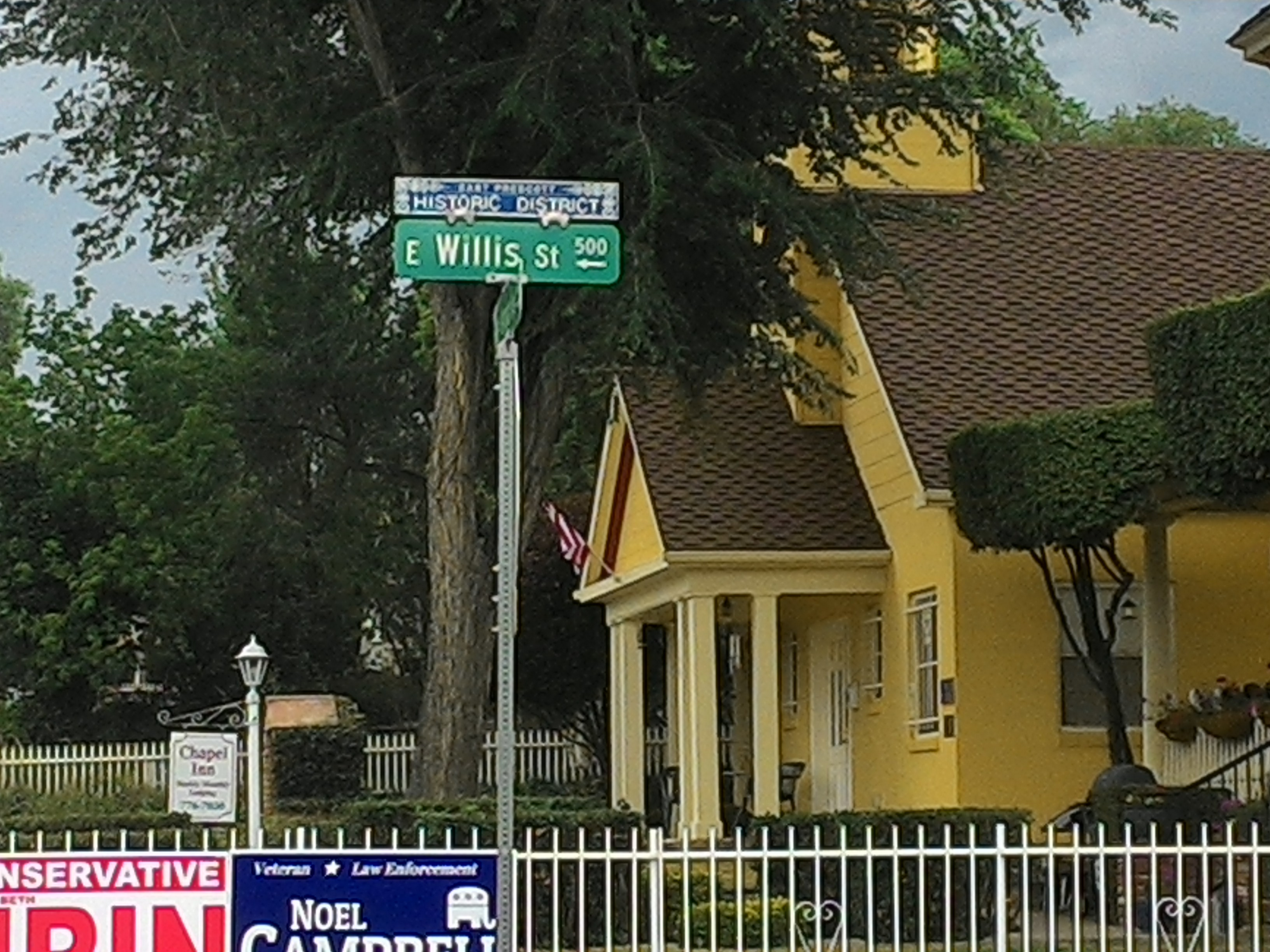
East Prescott Historic District

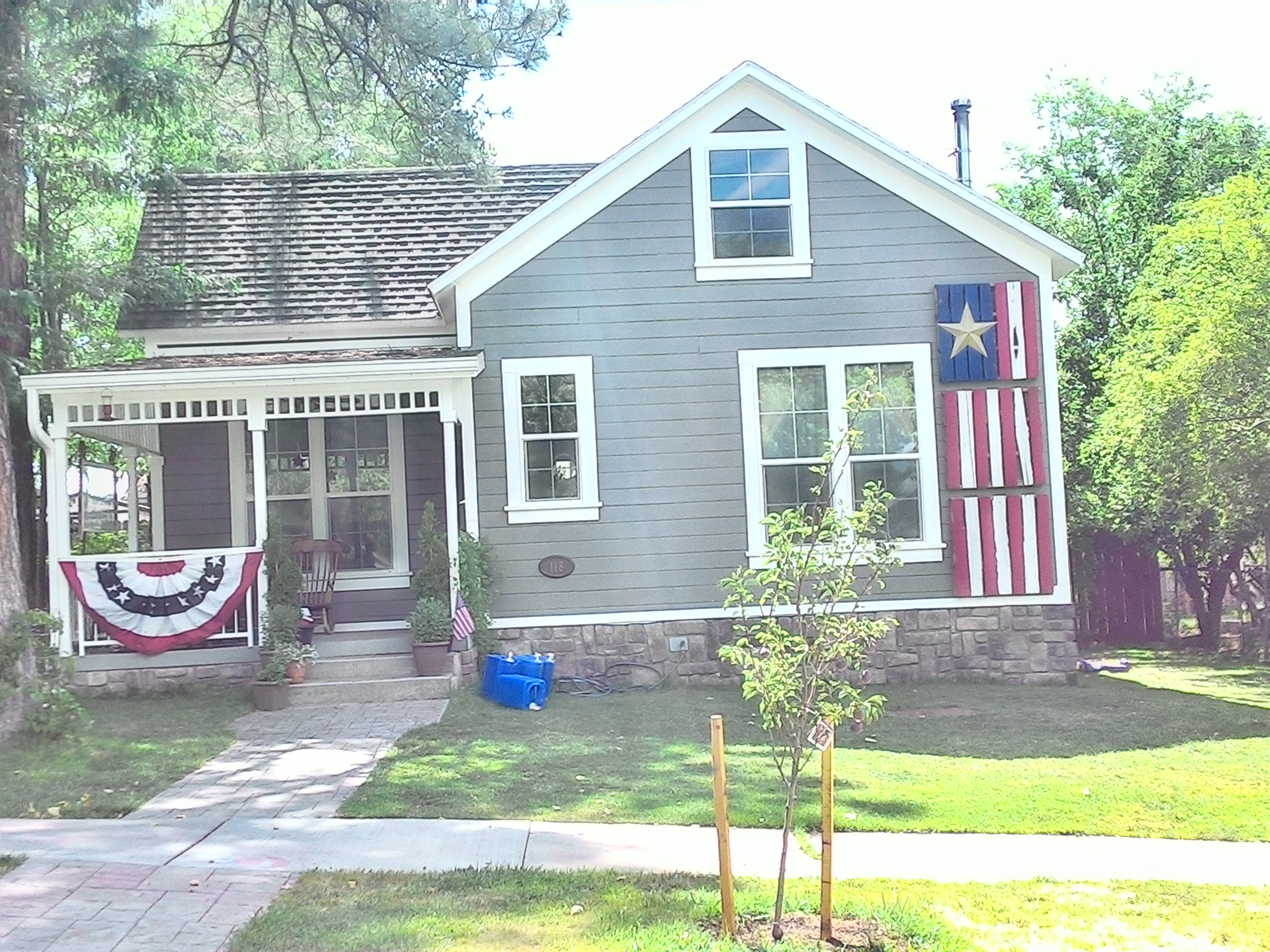
Flurry's Addition Historic District

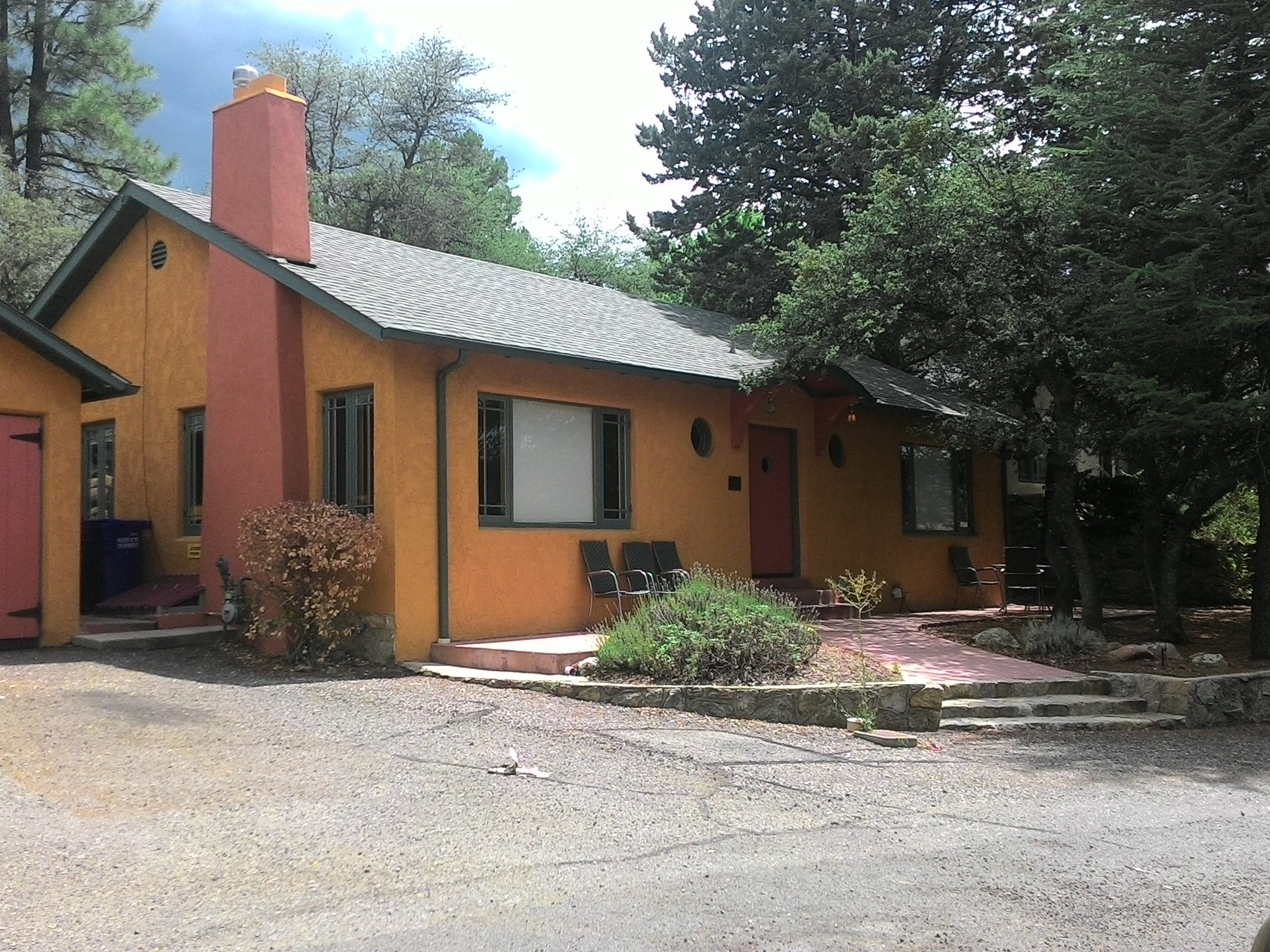
Hassayampa Historic District

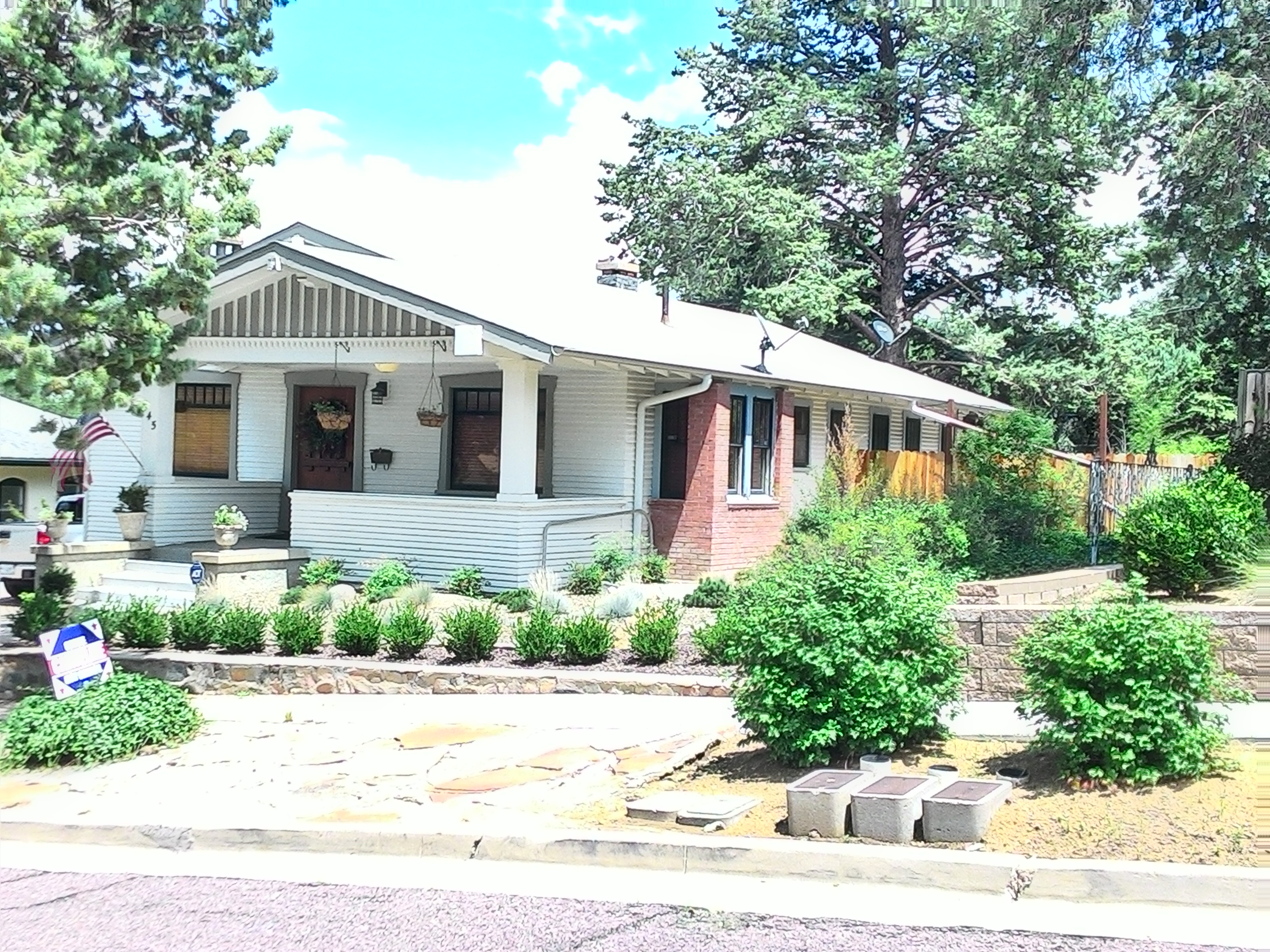
Joslin and Whipple Historic District

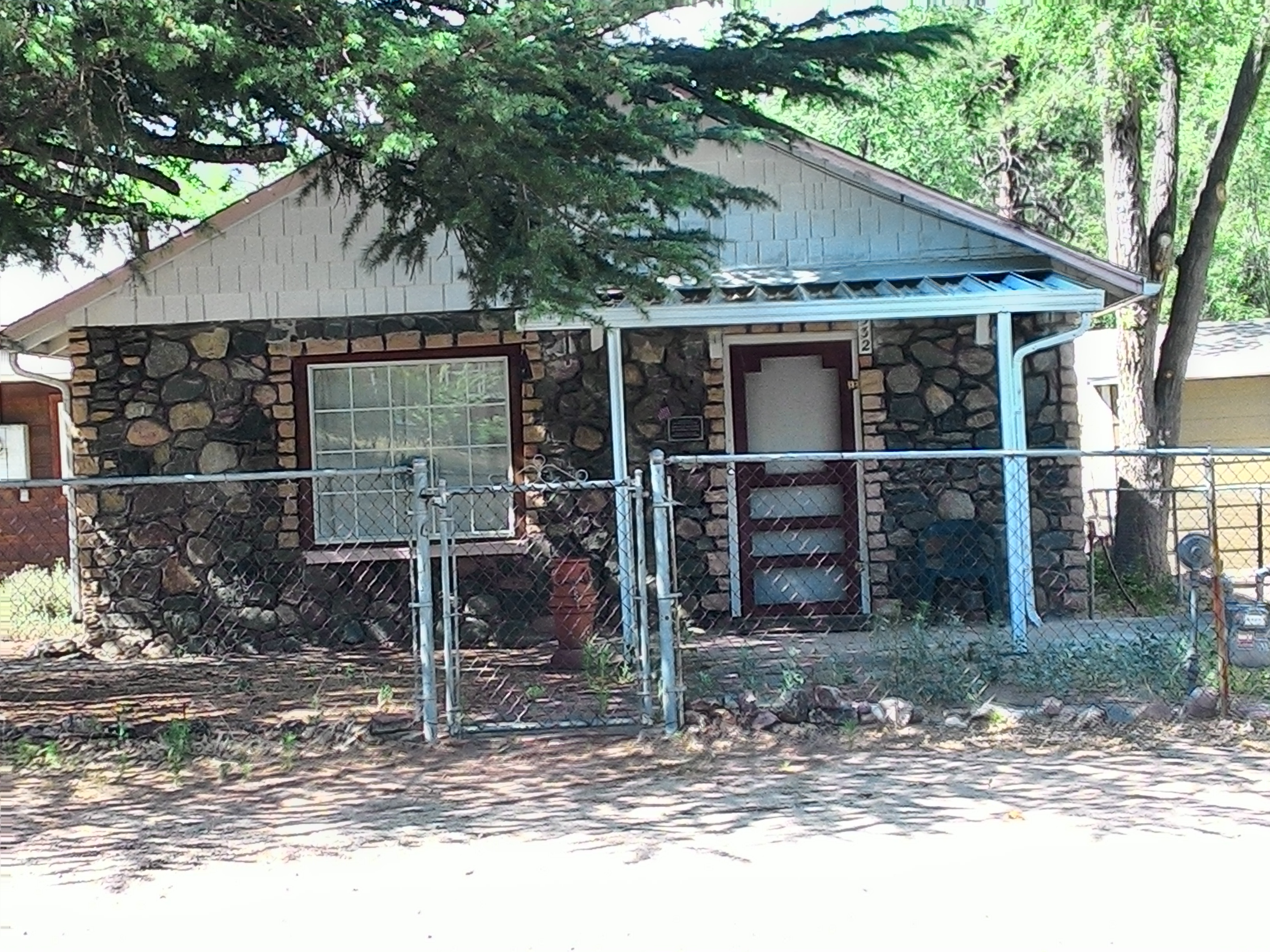
Mile High Park Historic District

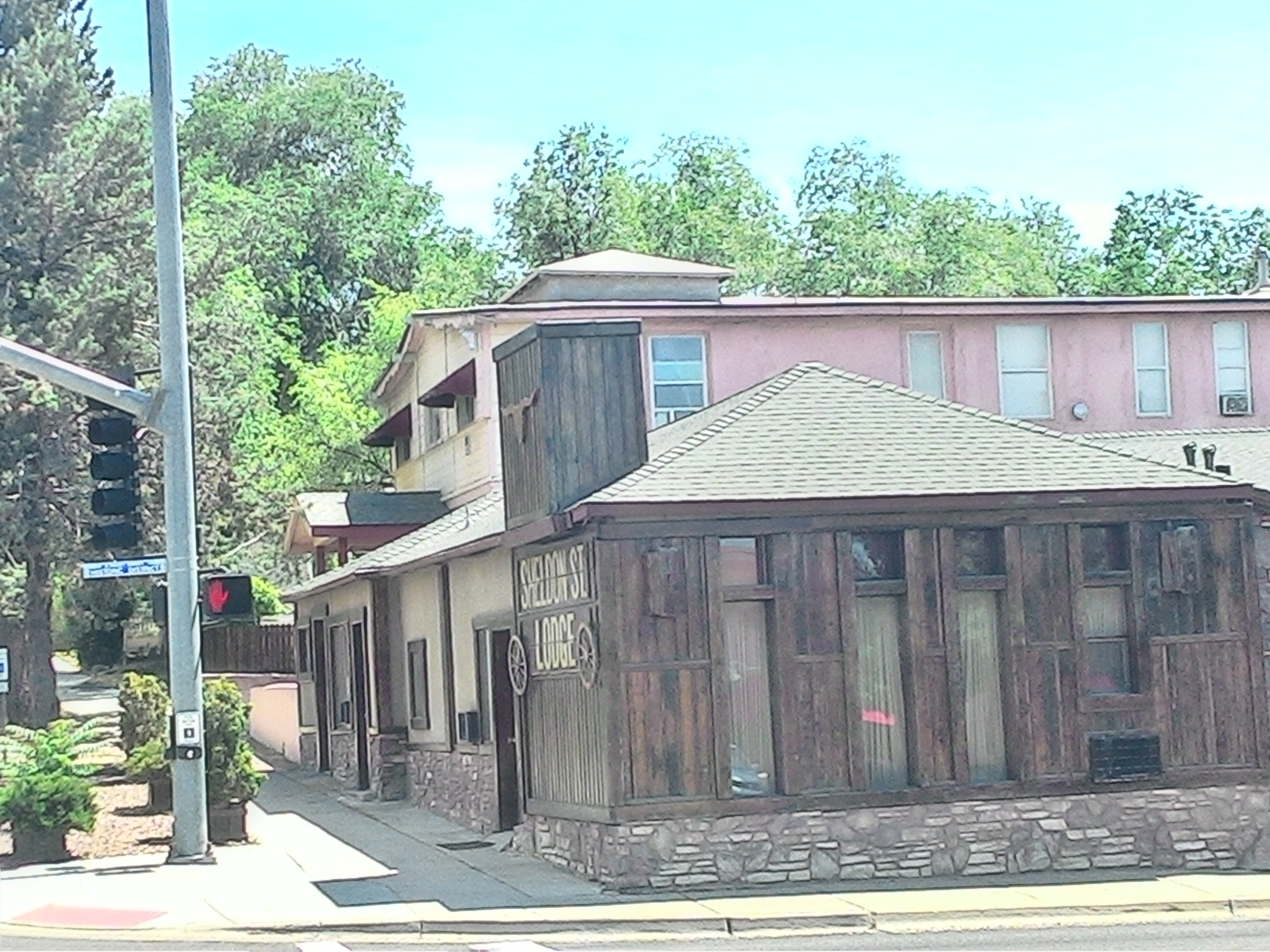
North Prescott Townsite Historic District

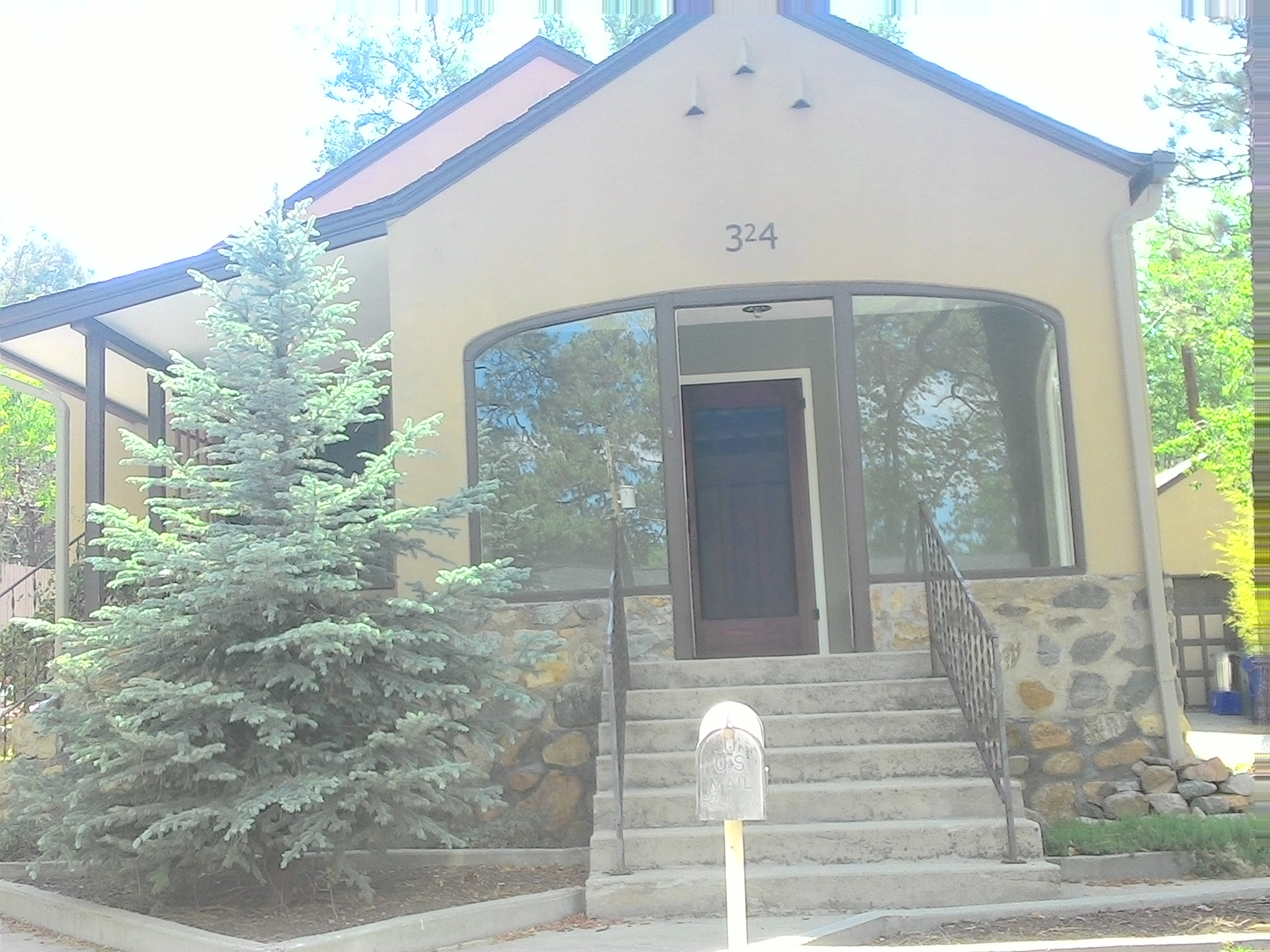
Pine Crest Historic District

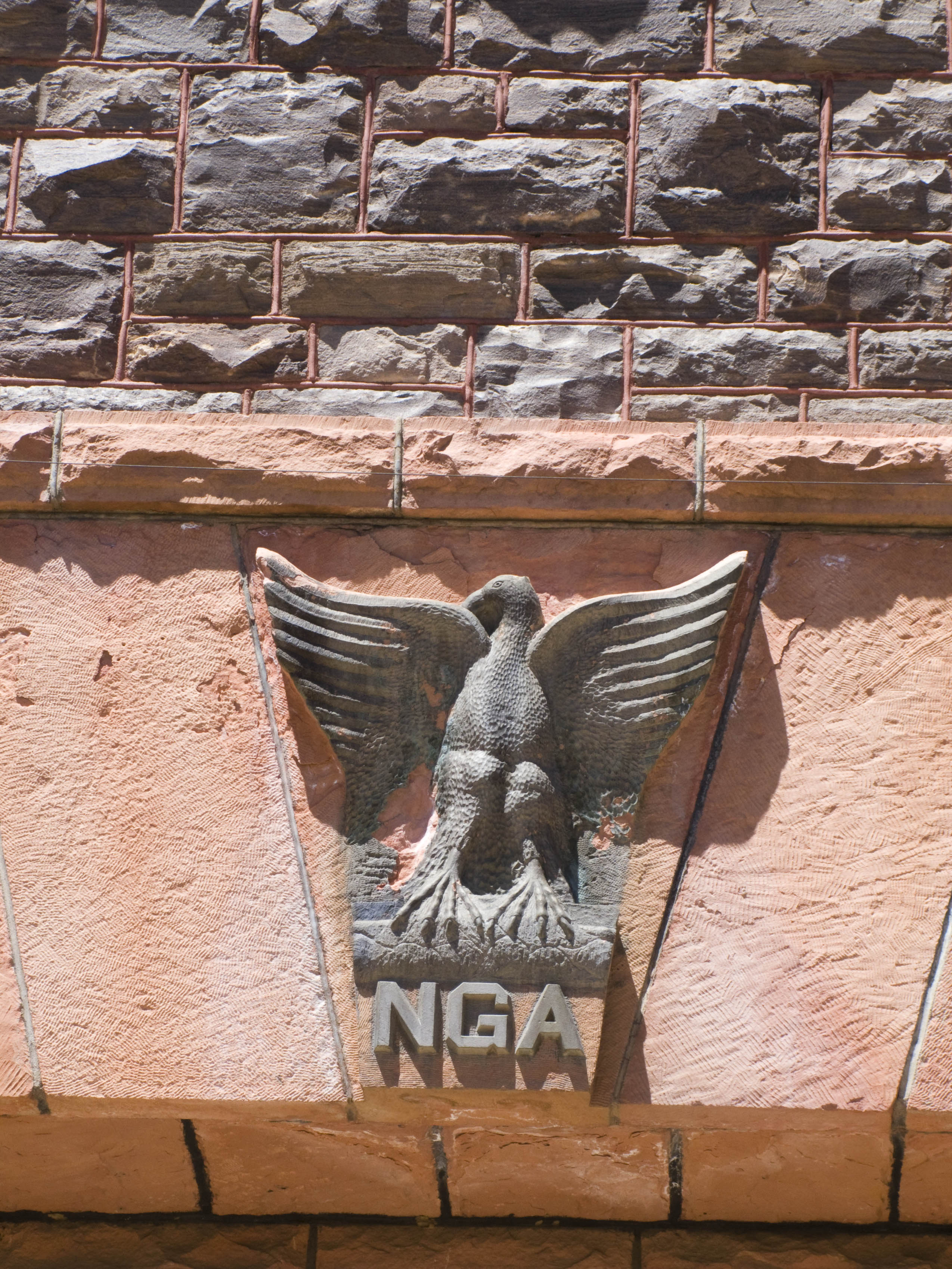
Prescott Armory Historic District

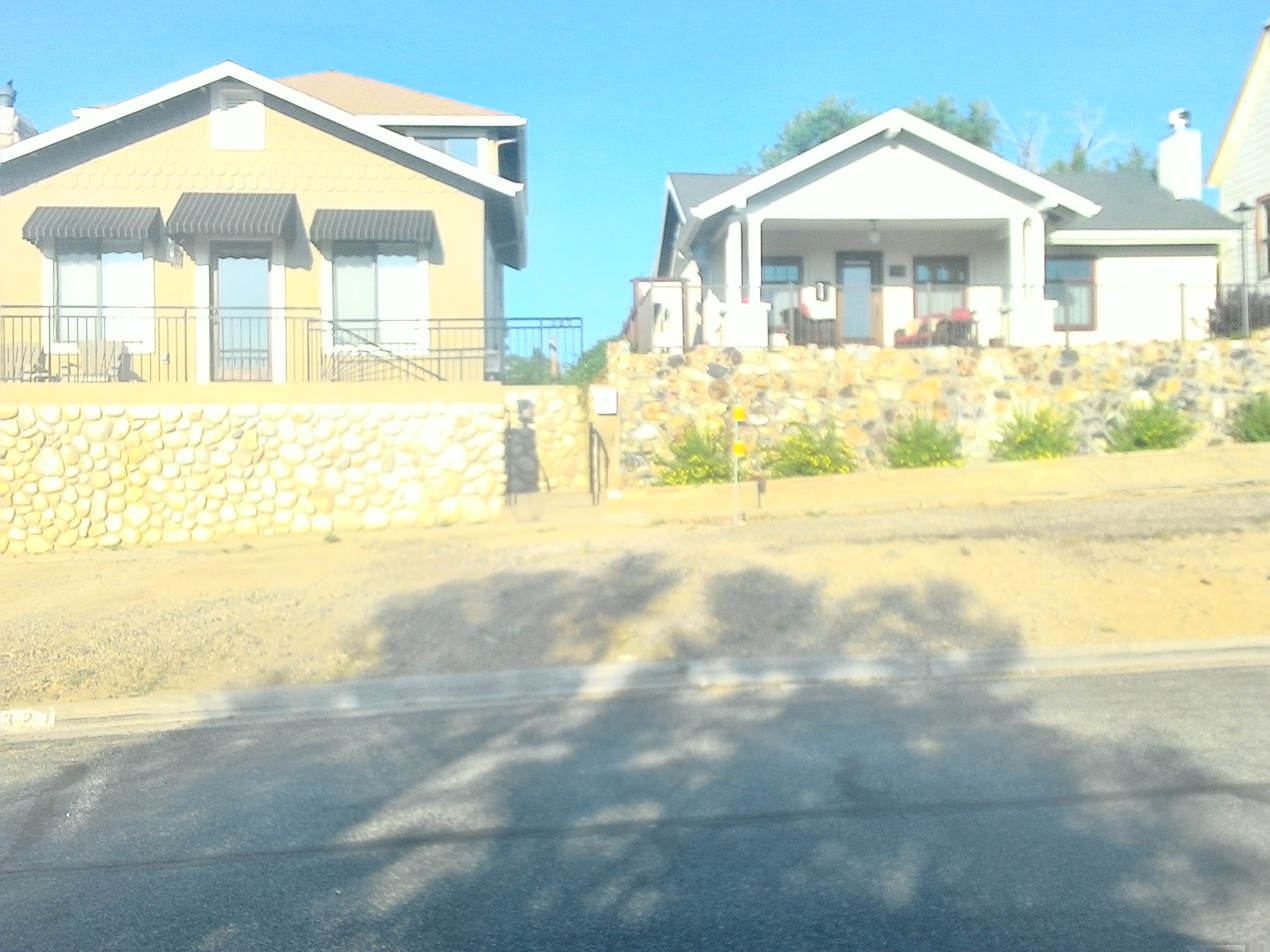
South Prescott Townsite

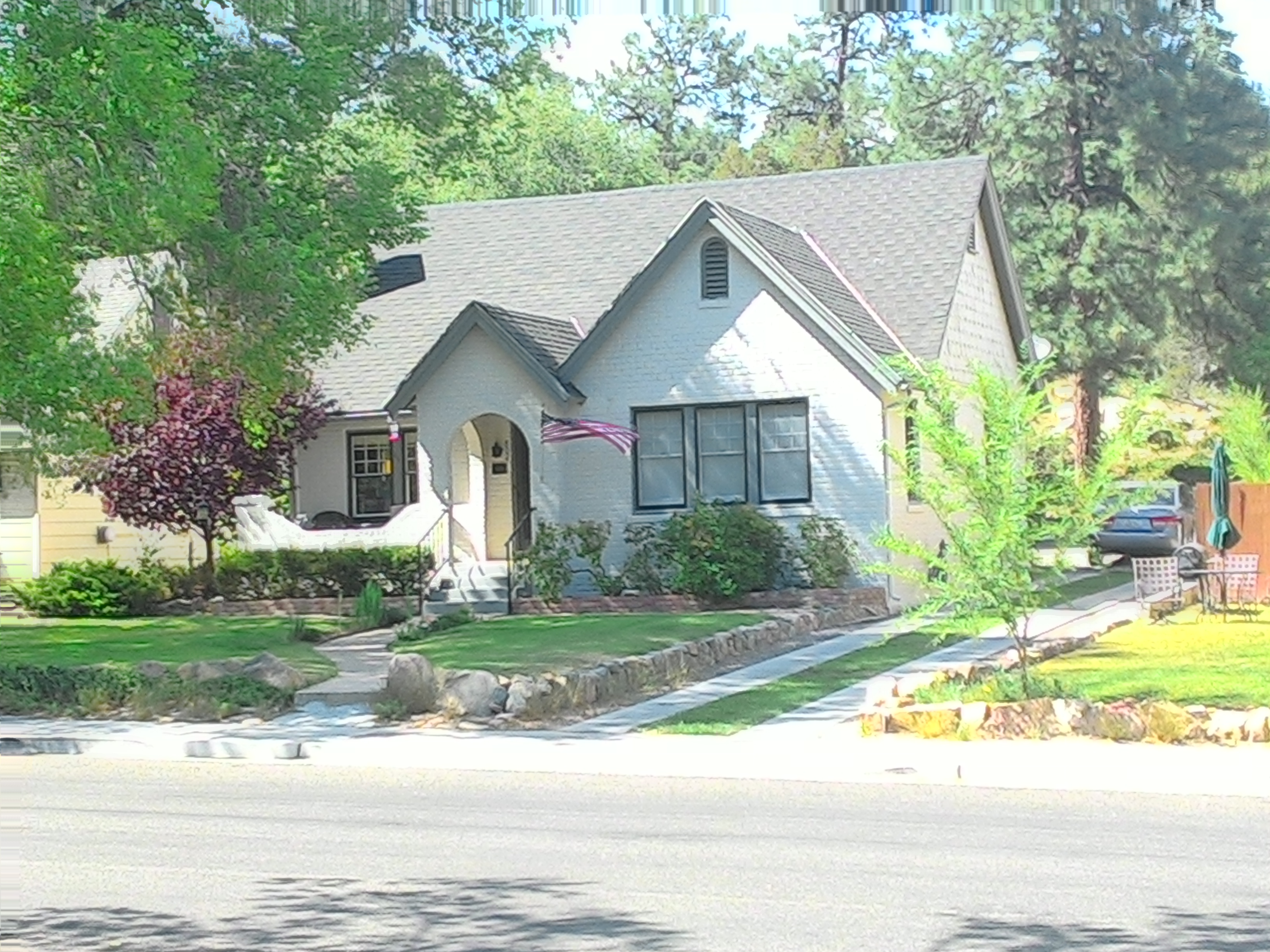
West Prescott Historic District

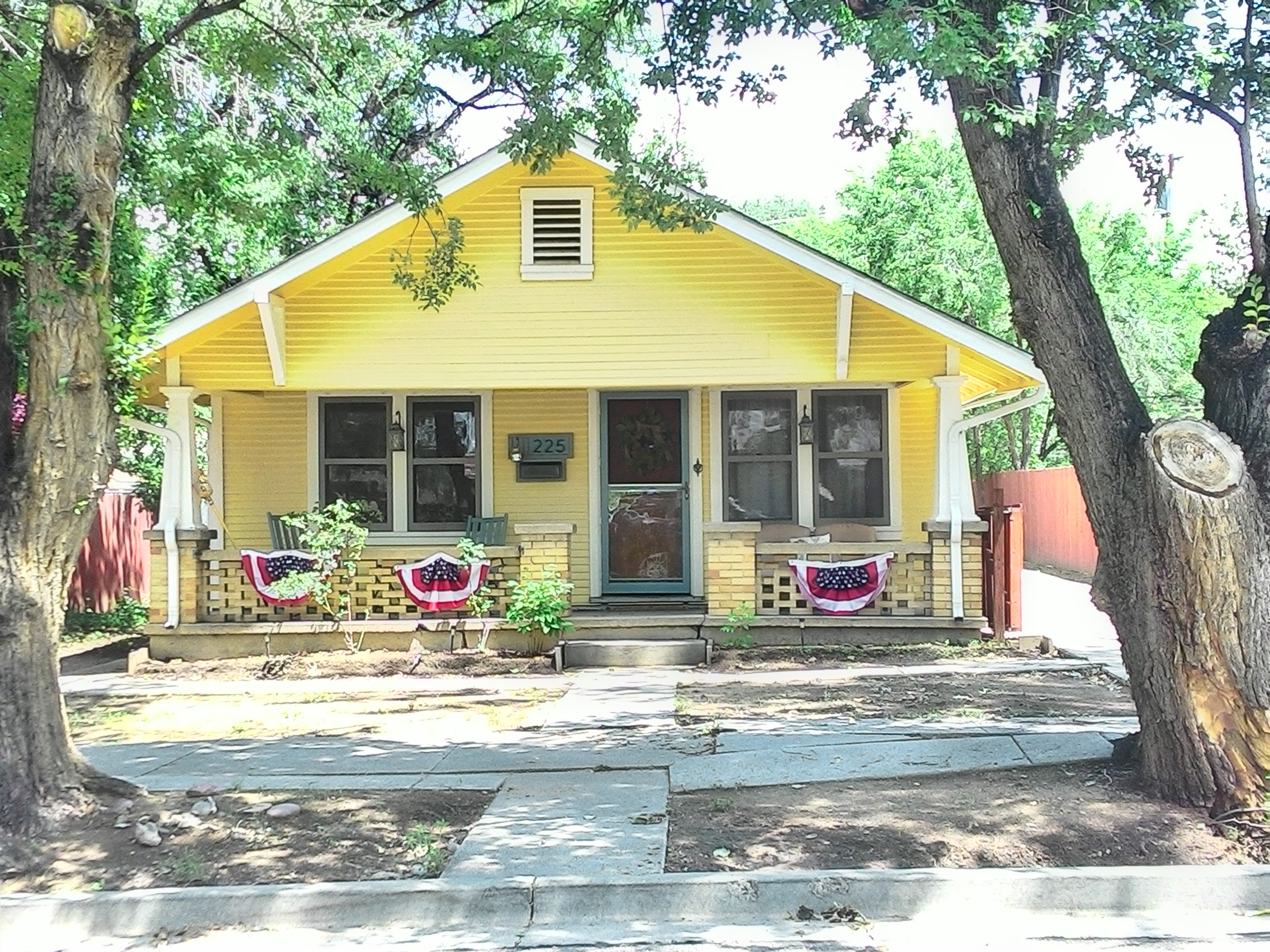
Whipple Heights Historic District

=== Bridge ===
The Atchison, Topeka & Santa Fe Railway (ATSF) Granite Creek Bridge is a Pratt through truss railroad bridge which was built in 1910 and abandoned in 1961. It was relocated to the Downtown Prescott Greenways Trail where it currently stands.

ATSF – Granite Creek Bridge
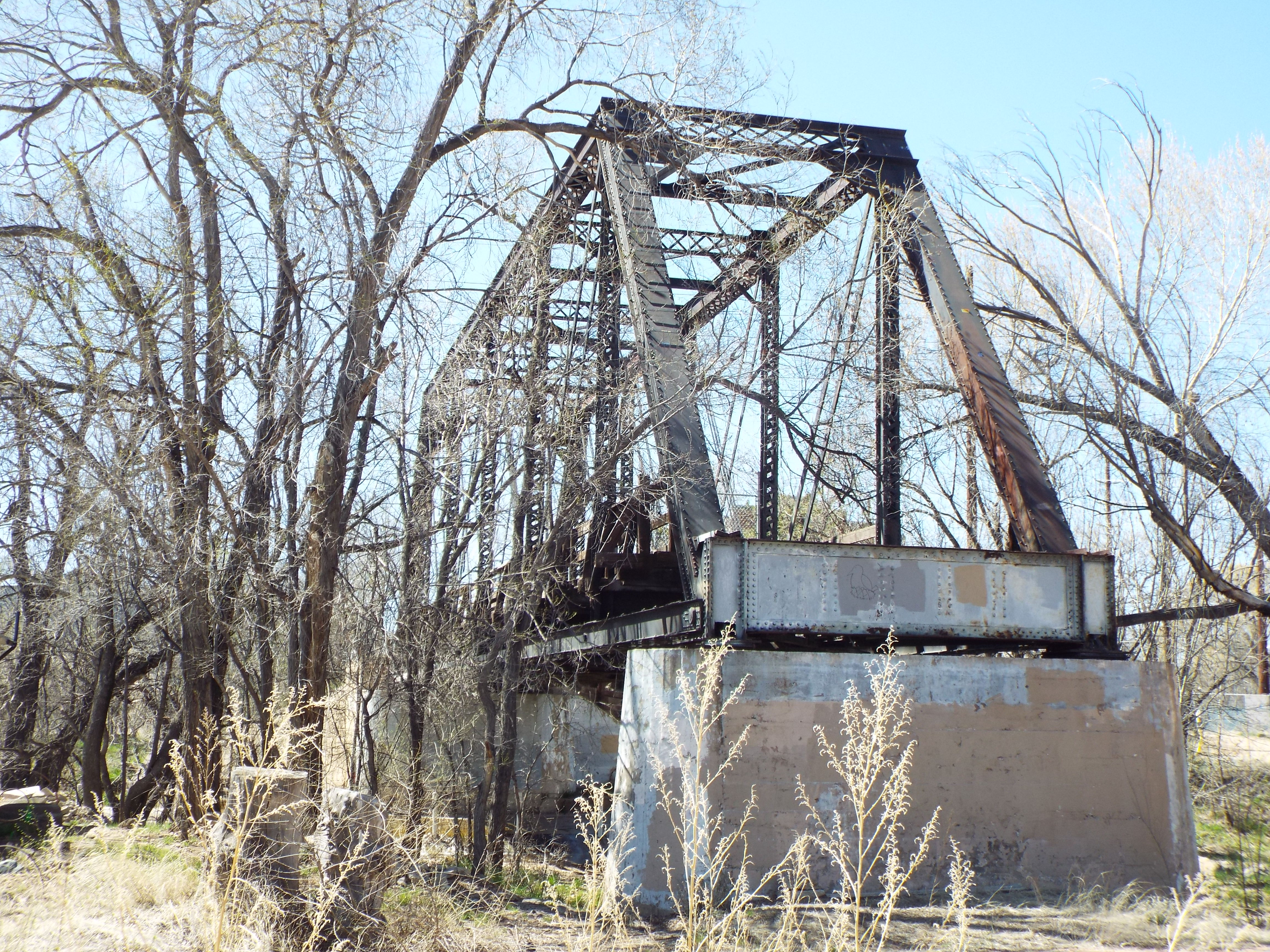
The Granite Creek Bridge

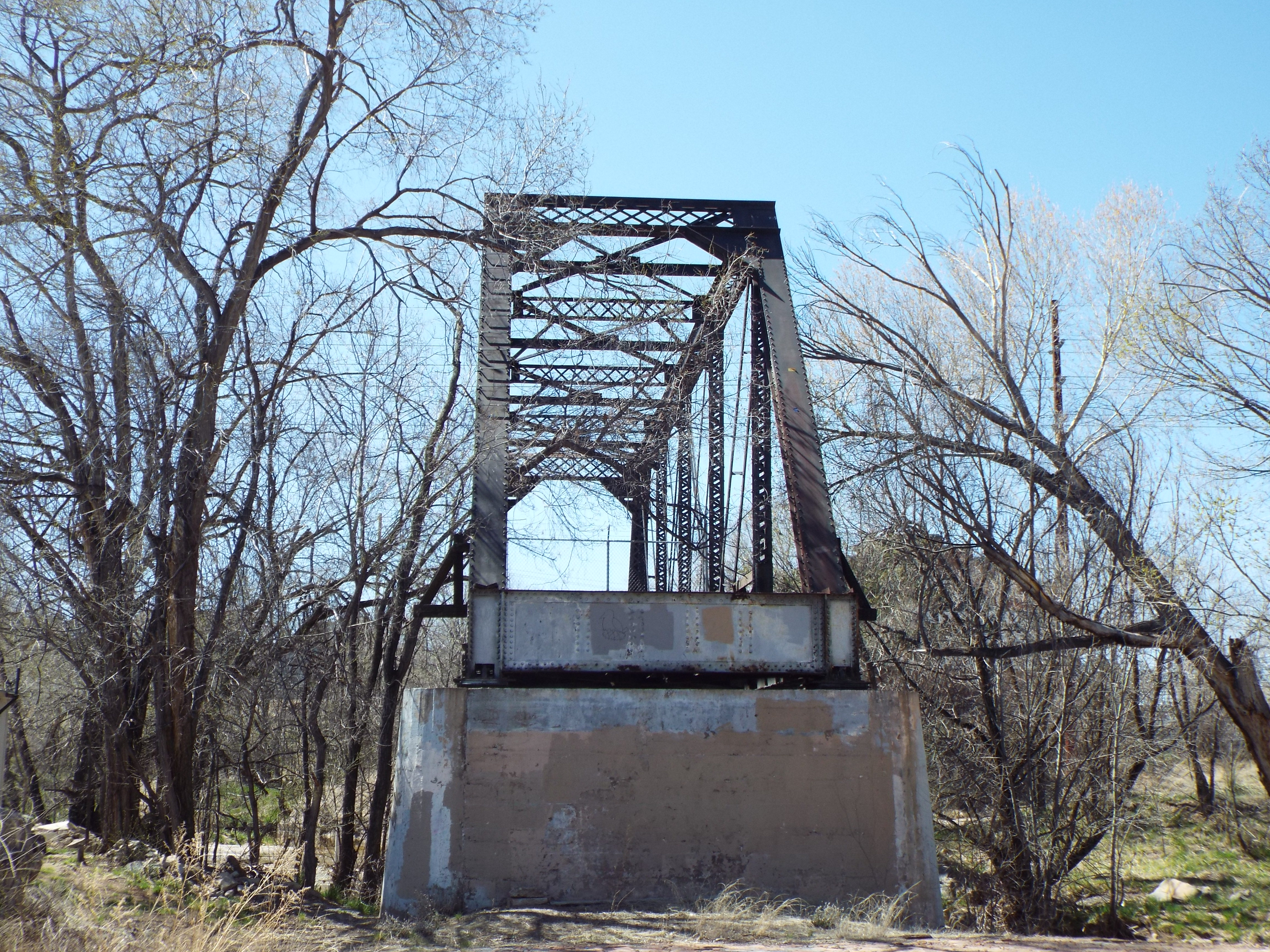
Front view of the Granite Creek Bridge

=== Buildings ===
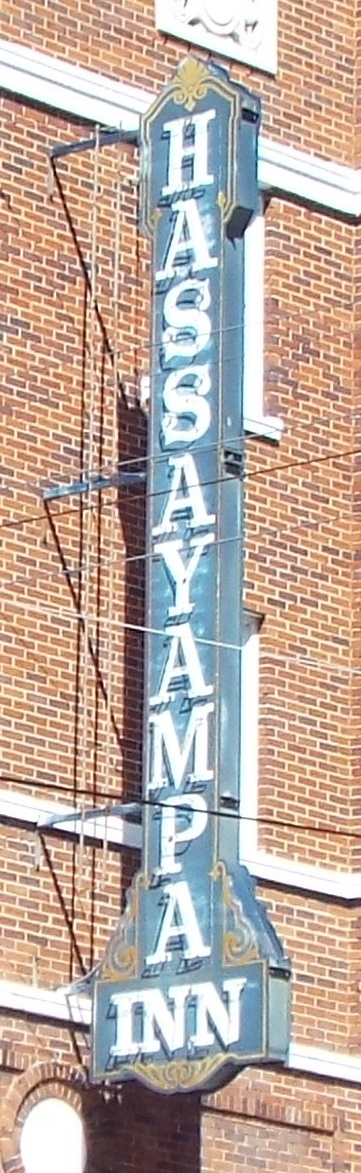
Vintage sign of the Hassayama Inn

The following historical buildings are individually listed in the National Register of Historic Places:

- Elks Building and Theater – built in 1904 and located at 117 E. Gurley St. Listed in the National Register of Historic Places on December 14, 1978, reference #78003226
- James I. Gardner Store – built in 1890 and located at 201 N. Cortez Street. Listed in the National Register of Historic Places on December 14, 1978, reference #78003230
- Hassayampa Inn – built in 1927 and located at 122 E. Gurley St. Listed in the National Register of Historic Places on November 29, 1979, reference #79000429
- Sam Hill Hardware building – built in 1900 and located at 154 S. Montezuma Listed in the National Register of Historic Places on December 14, 1978, reference #78003252
- Samuel Hill Hardware Company Warehouse – built in 1903 and located at 232 N. McCormick St. Listed in the National Register of Historic Places on September 13, 1984, reference #84000772
- Hotel Vendome – built in 1917 and located at 230 S. Cortez St. Listed in the National Register of Historic Places on November 25, 1983, reference #83003495
- Mountain States Telephone and Telegraph Exchange Building – built in 1933 and located at 116 N. Marina St. Listed in the National Register of Historic Places on September 16, 2004, reference #04000512
- The City Park and Ball Field a.k.a. the "Ken Lindley Field and Park"-built in 1908 and located on the NE of Gurley & Washington Streets.
- Carnegie library/Prescott Public Library – built in 1903 and located at 125 East Gurley St. Listed in the National Register of Historic Places on May 28, 1975, reference #75000365
- Mulvenon Building – built in 1901 and located at 230 W. Gurley St. Completed in August 1901, the Mulvenon Building was one of the first buildings constructed after the fire of 1900. It replaced a one-story wood-frame saloon building which was destroyed in the fire. Listed in the National Register of Historic Places on September 16, 2004, reference #04000512
- Prescott National Guard Armory – built in and located at Listed in the National Register of Historic Places on August 15, 1994, reference #94000829
- Santa Fe, Prescott and Phoenix Railroad Depot – built in 1907 and located at Cortez St. Listed in the National Register of Historic Places on February 8, 1988, reference #82004978
- Sisters of Mercy Hospital and Convent – built in 1896 and located at 200 Grove Ave.
- United States Post Office and Courthouse – built in 1931 and located at 101 W. Goodwin Ave. Listed in the National Register of Historic Places on December 3, 1985, reference #85003108
- The Washington Traditional School – built in 1907 and located at 300 E. Gurley Street
- The A.J. Head Hotel – built in 1901 and located 117 N. Cortez Street. The Post Office was once housed there. Later, the lower portion housed the New State Star moving picture theater before movies were seen at the Elk's Theater and J.C. Penney's was located there.
- The Santa Fe, Prescott and Phoenix Railway Depot – built in 1894 (now the Iron Café) and located at 1501 W. Iron Springs Road.
Historic buildings in Prescott

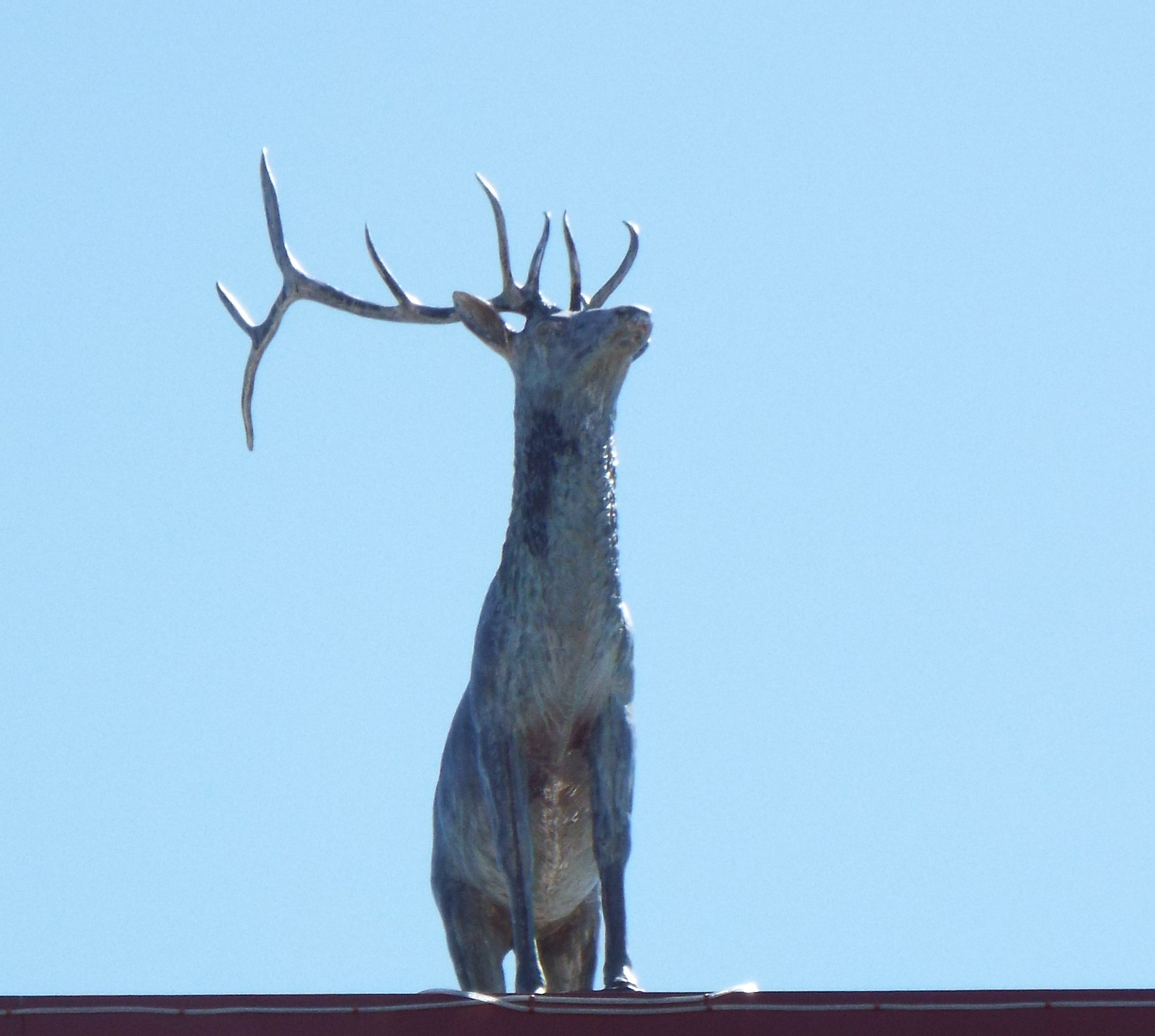
Elks Building and Theater roof

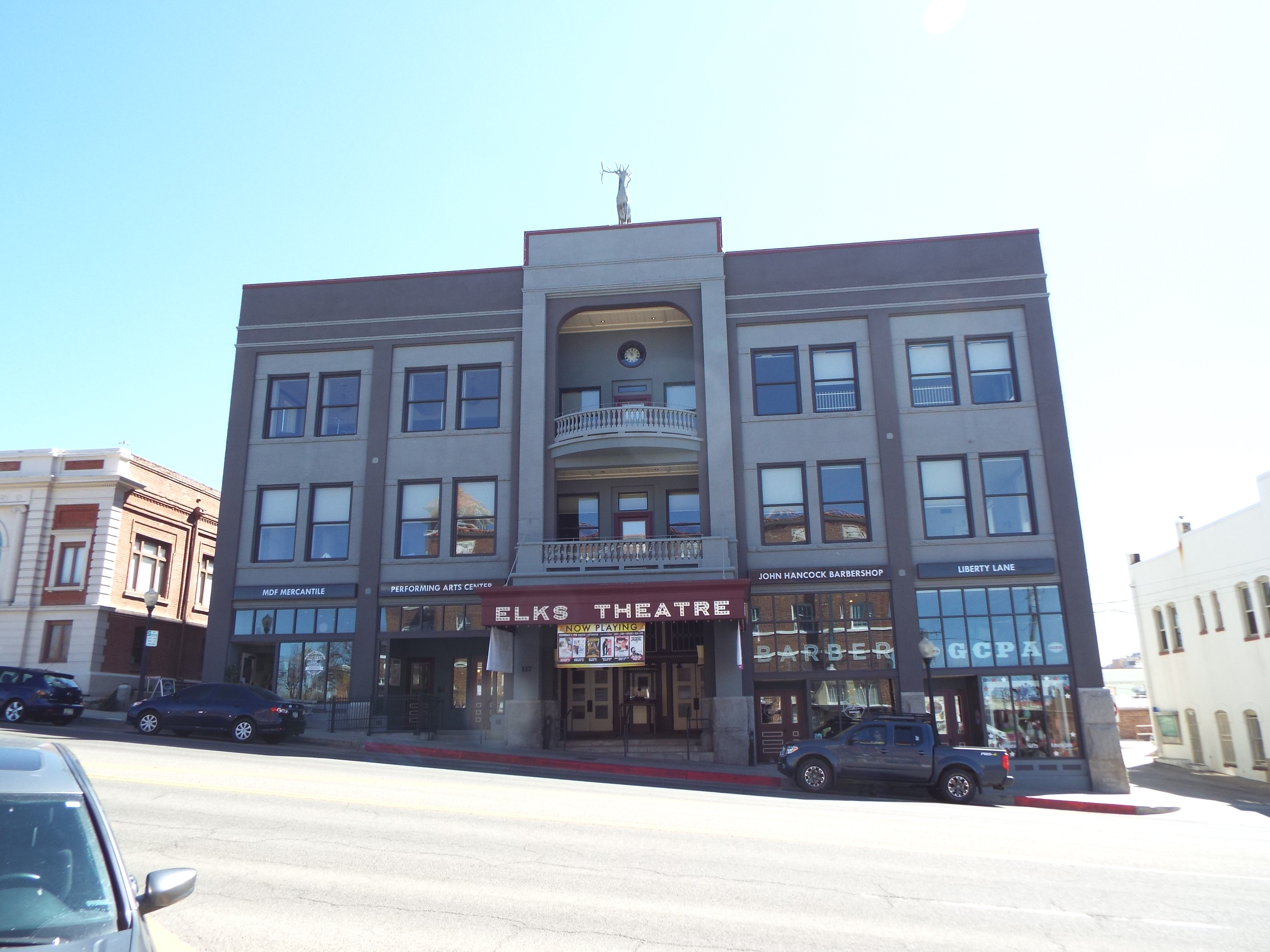
Elks Building and Theater

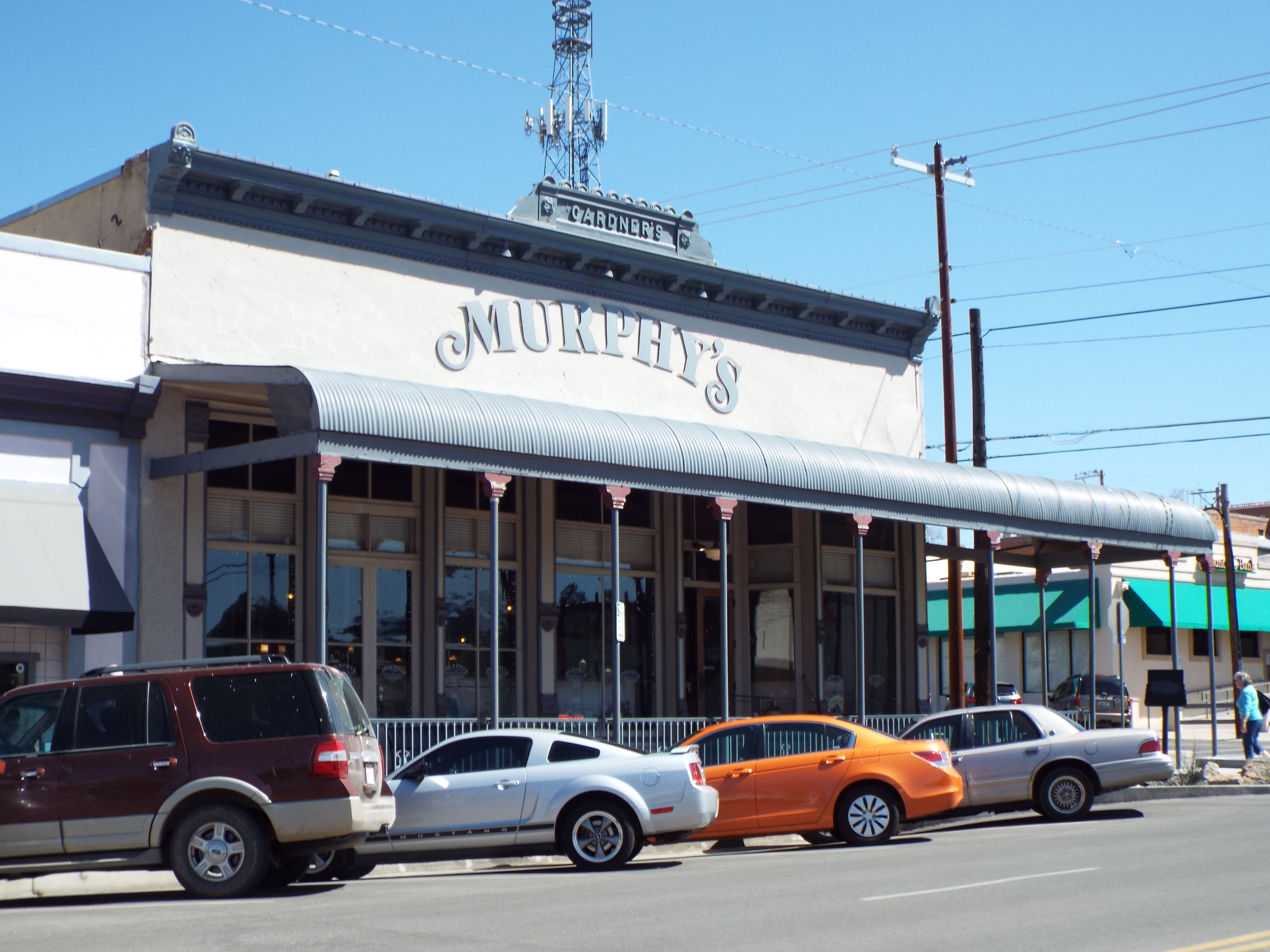
James I. Gardner Store

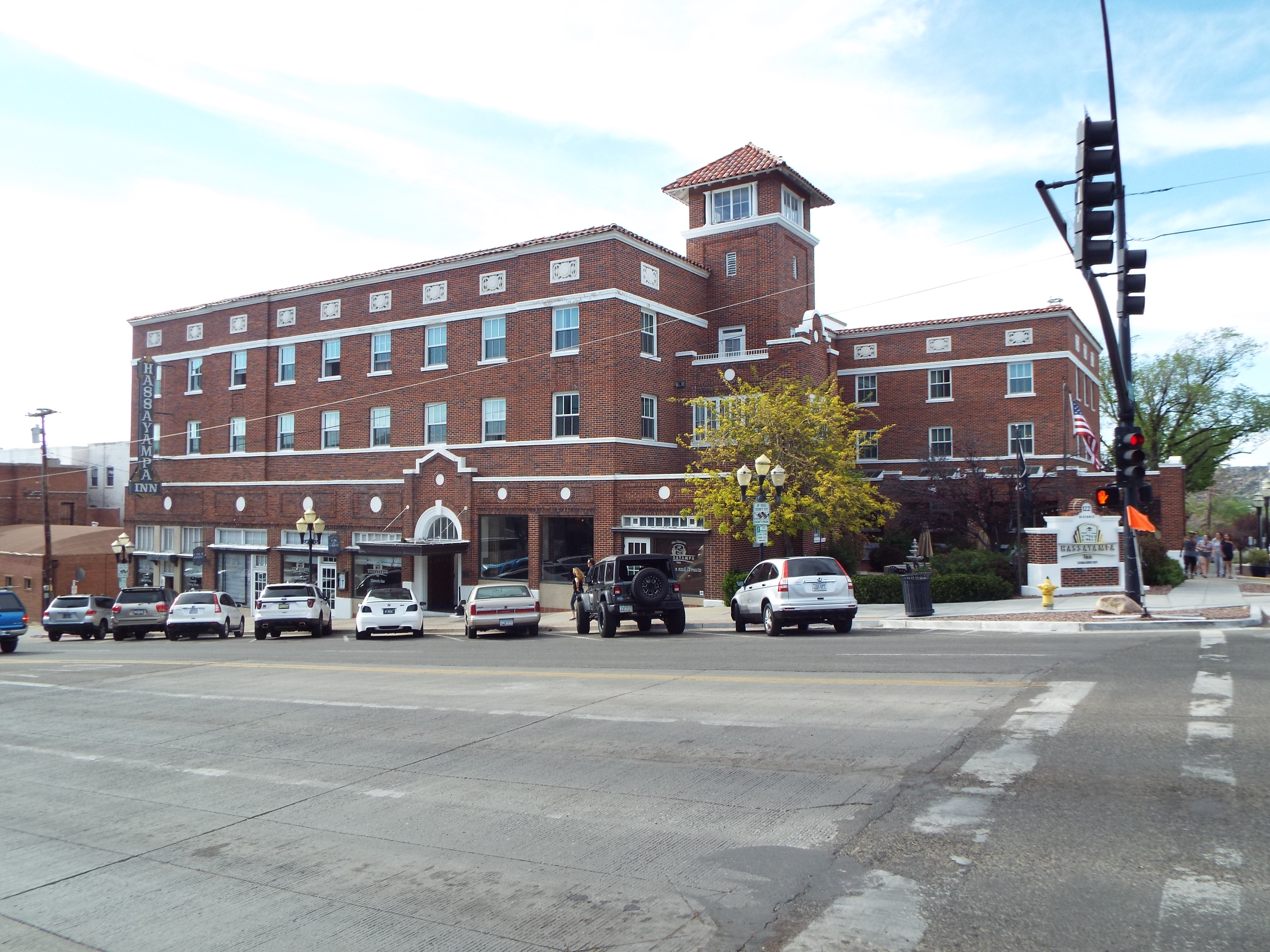
Hassayampa Inn

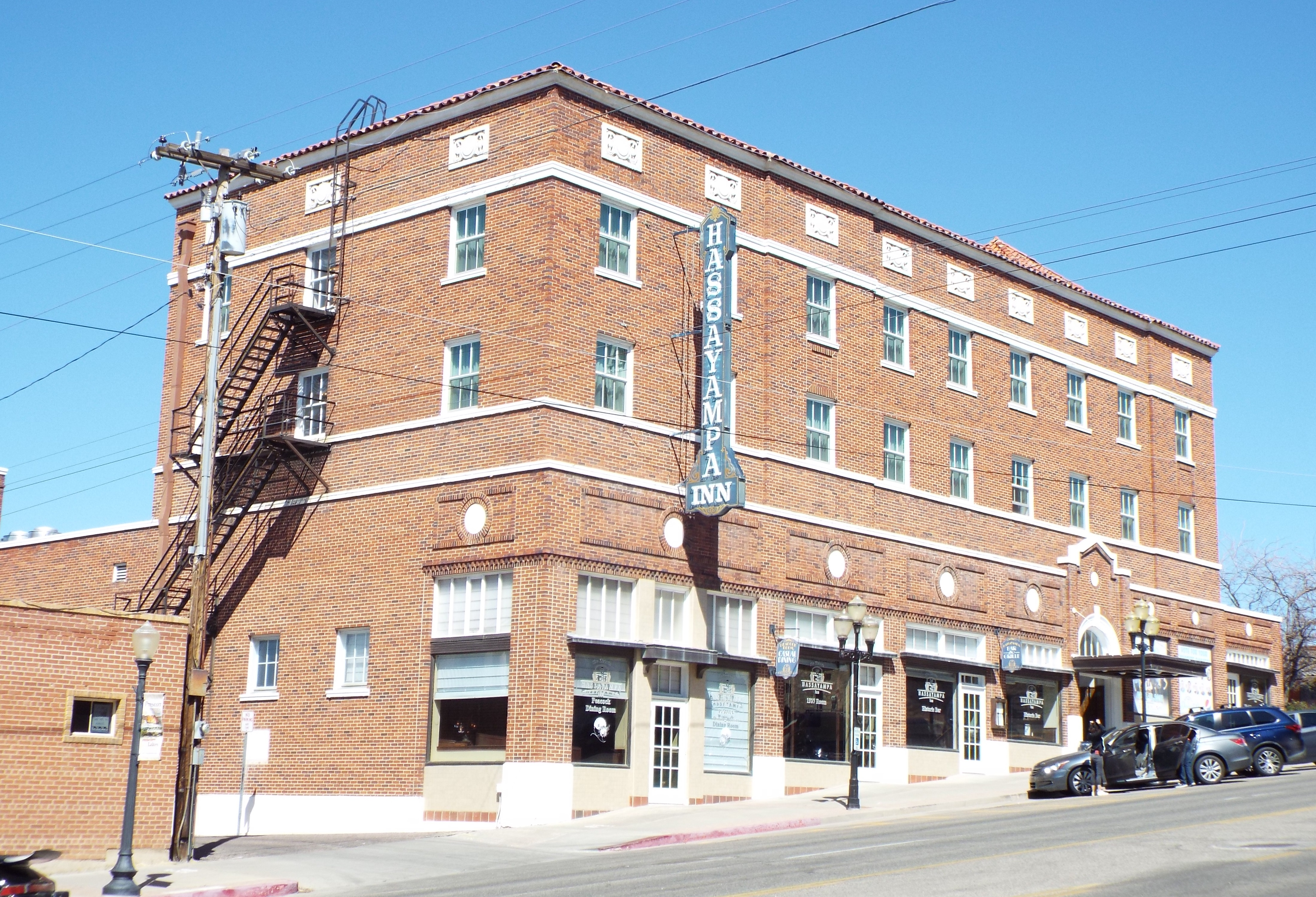
Back of the Hassayampa Inn

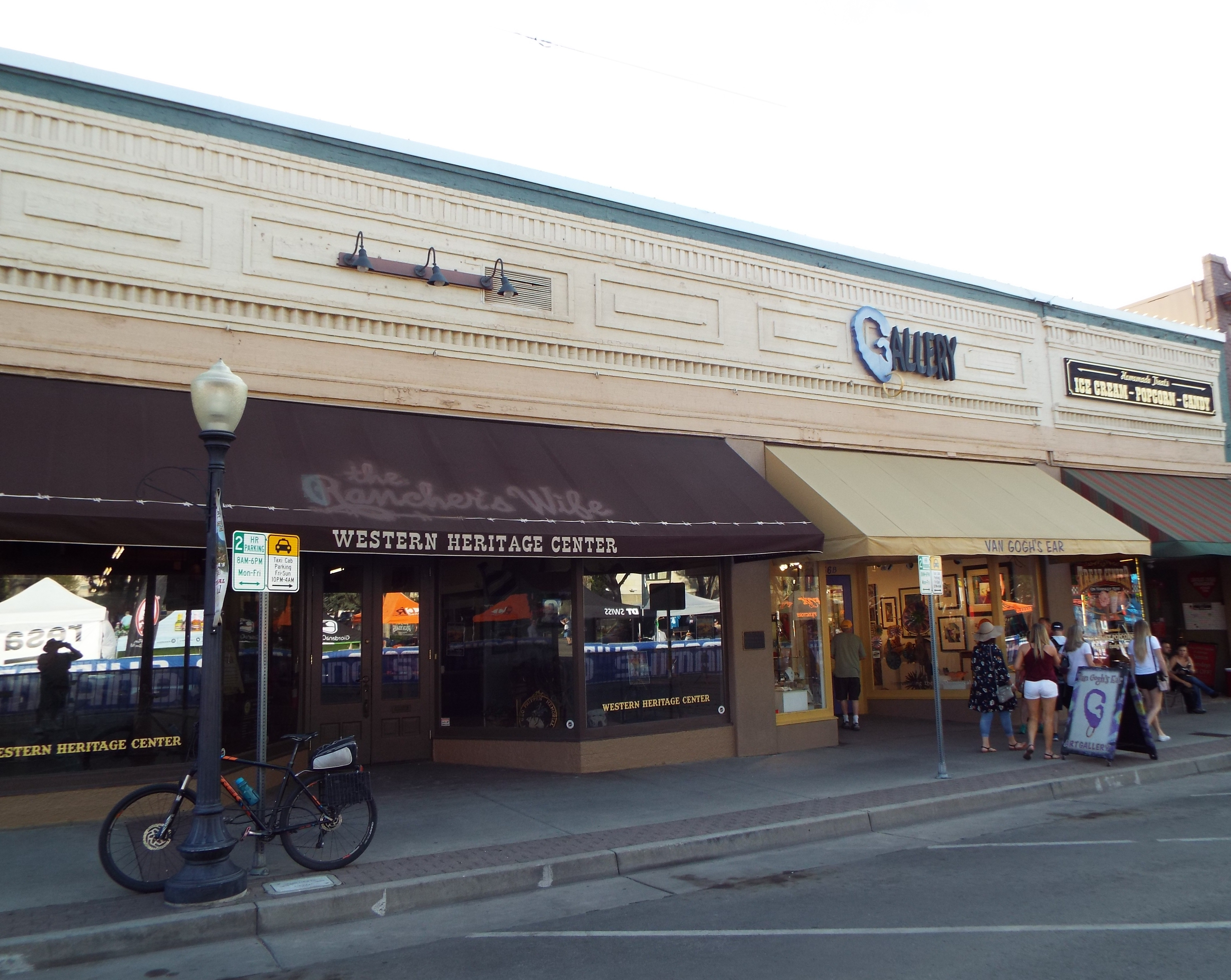
Sam Hill Hardware building

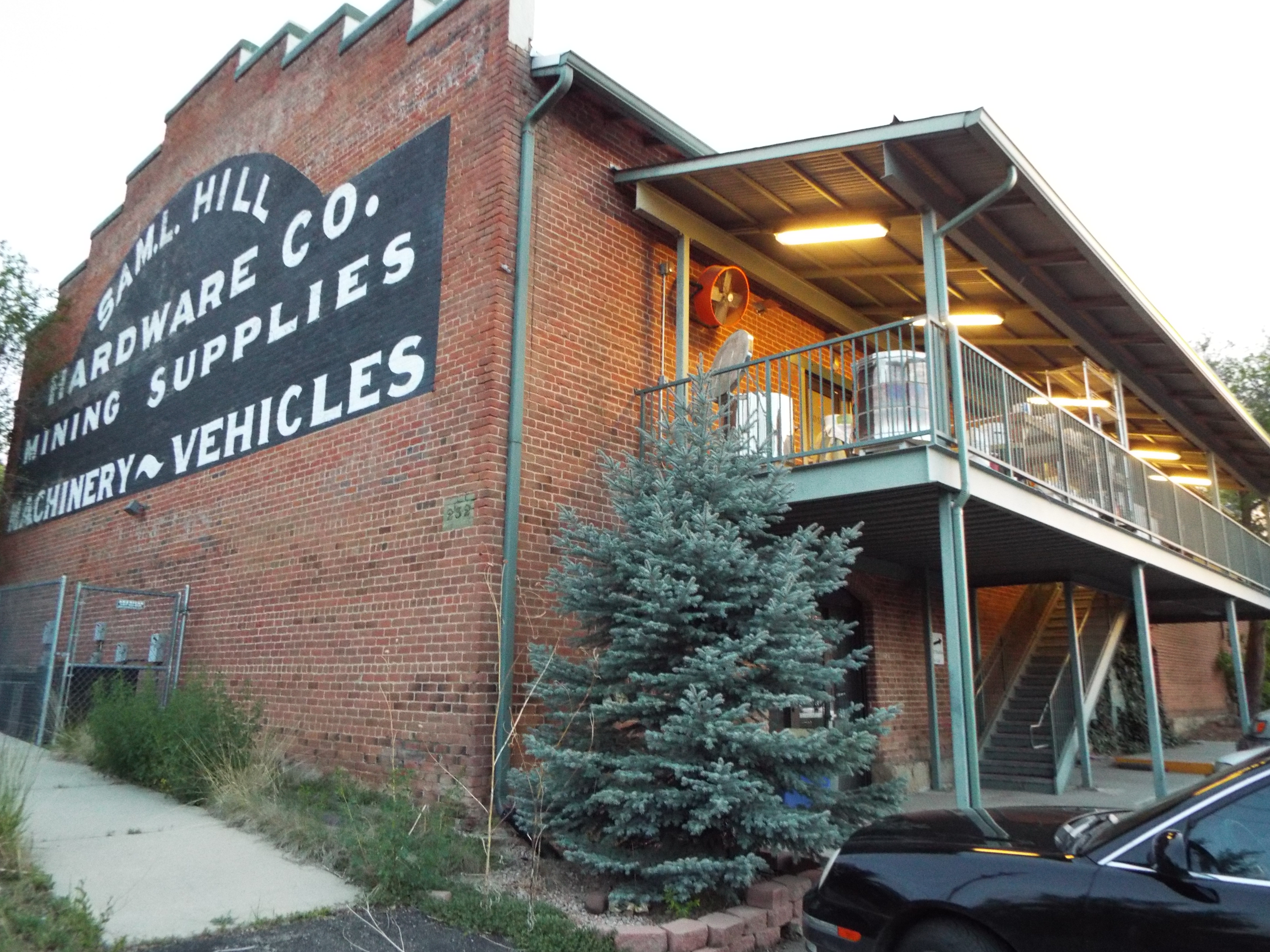
Samuel Hill Hardware Company Warehouse

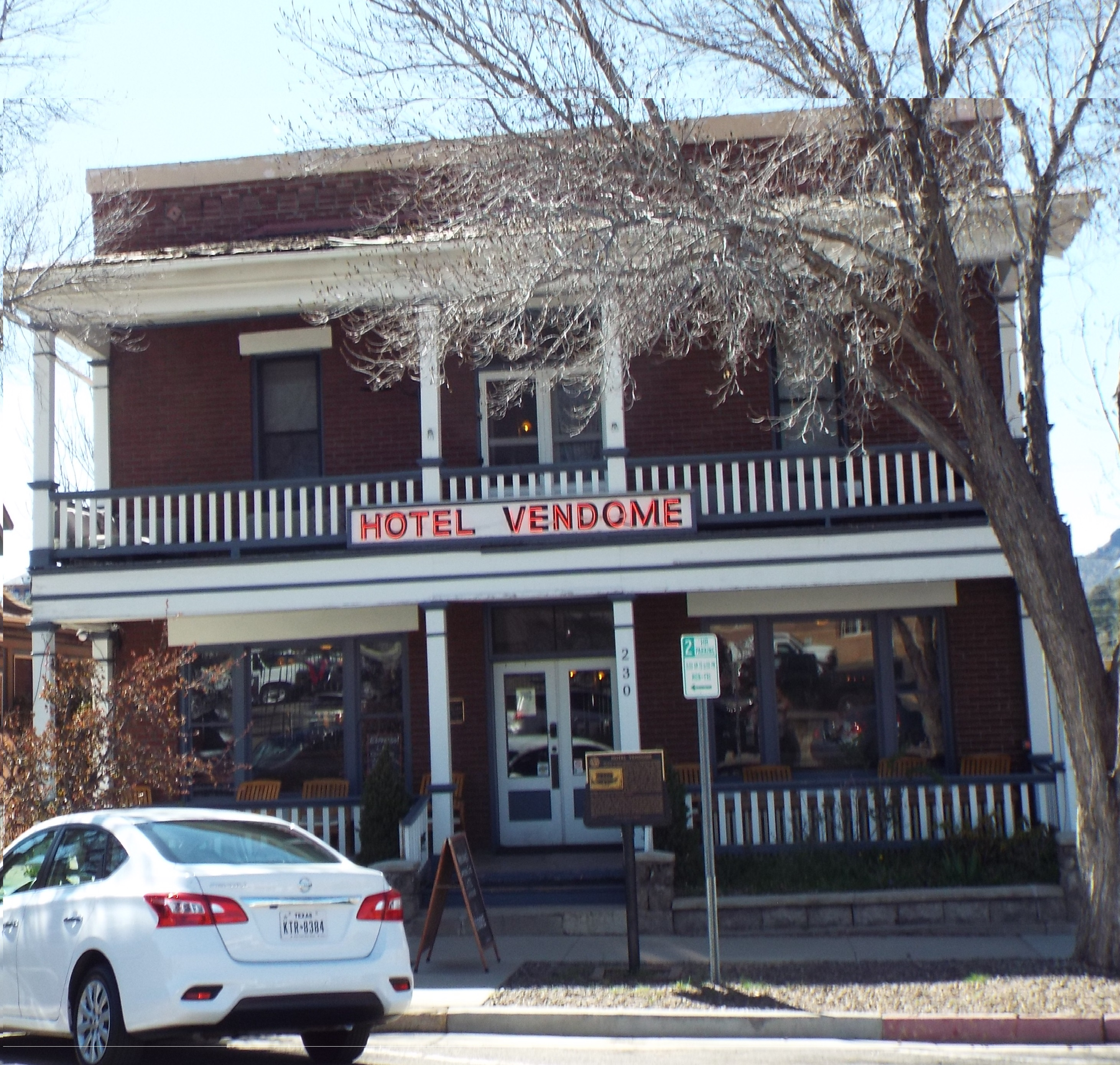
Hotel Vendome

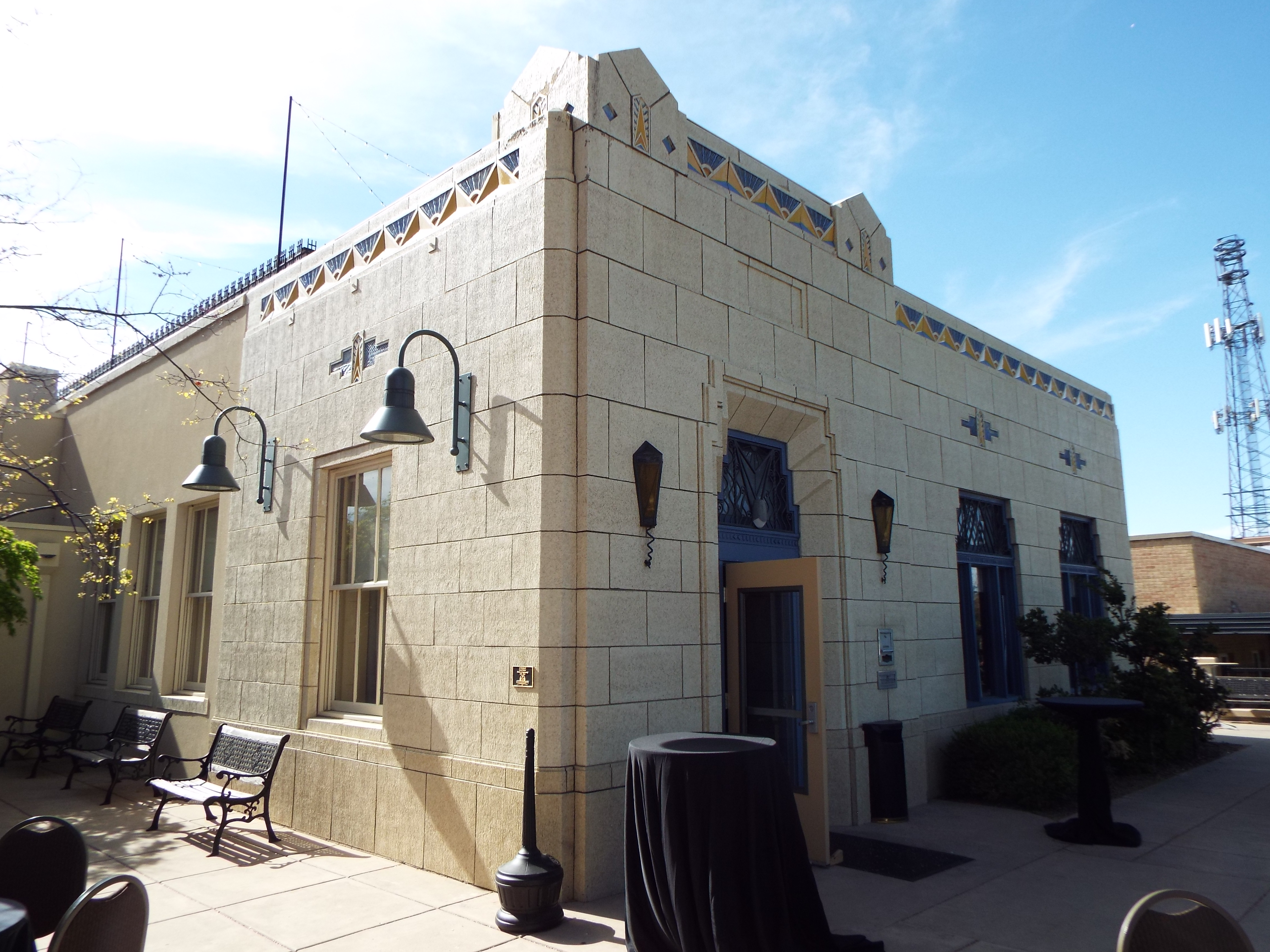
Mountain States Telephone and Telegraph Exchange Building

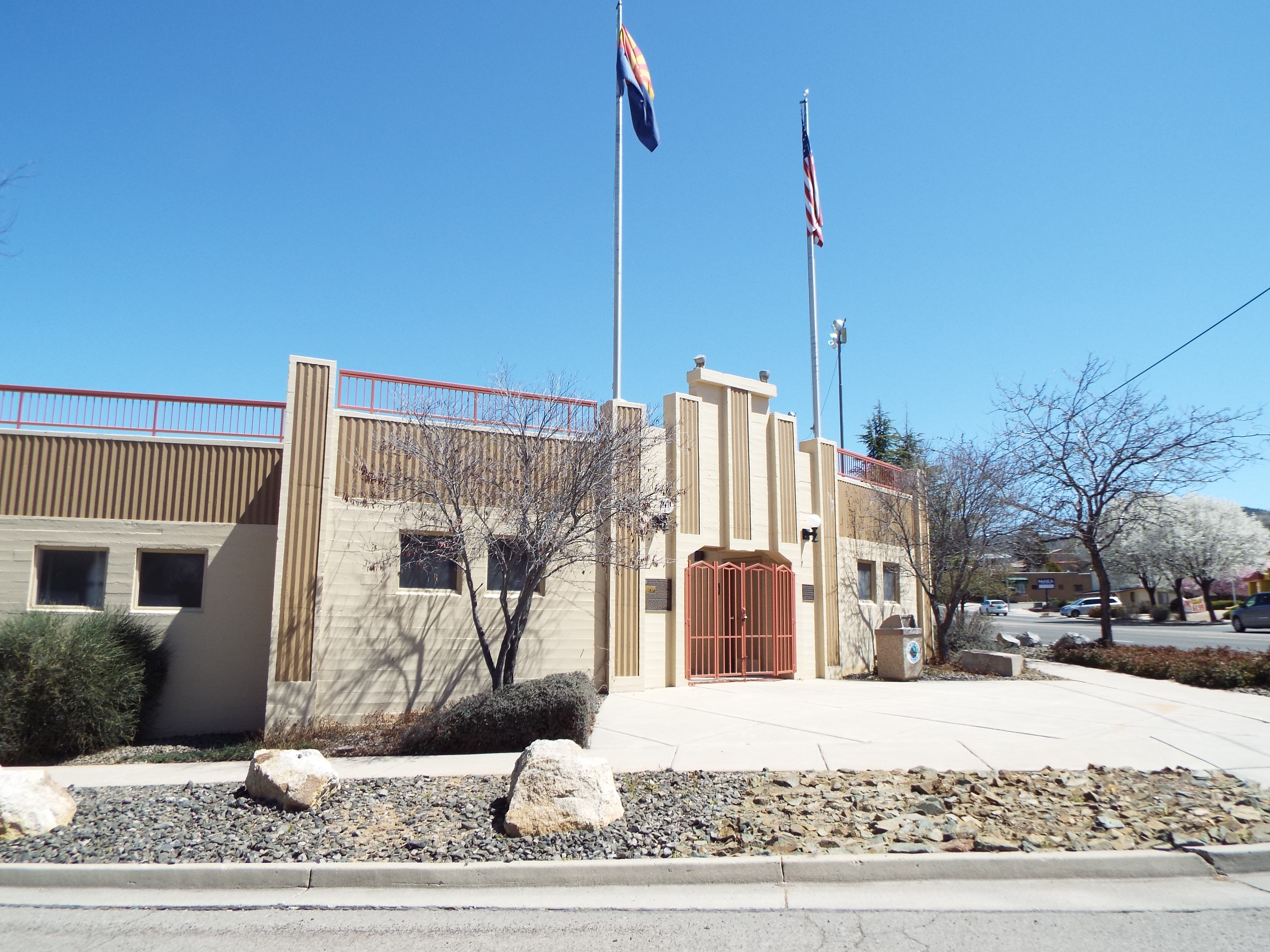
City Park and Ball Field

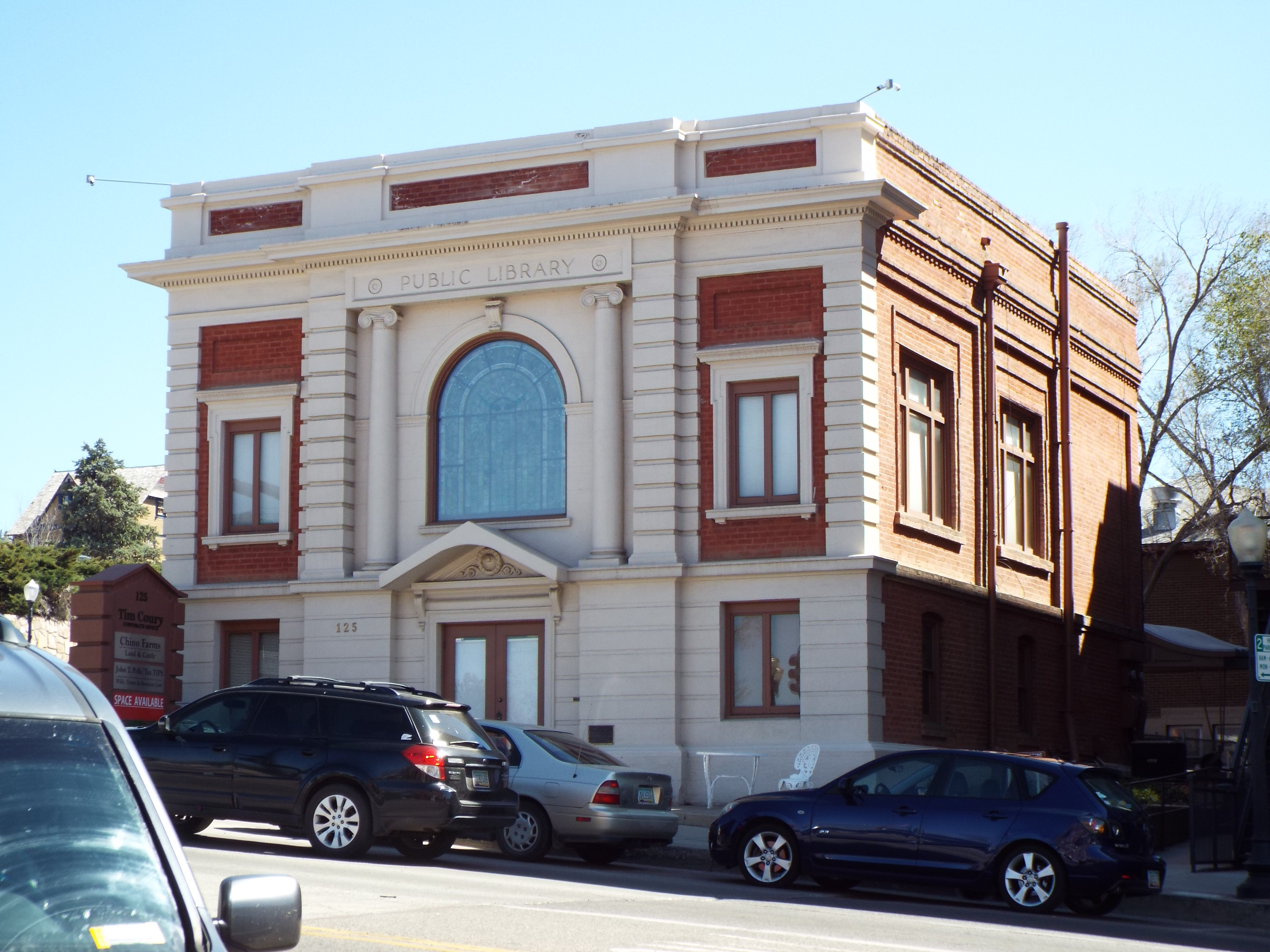
Carnegie library/Prescott Public Library

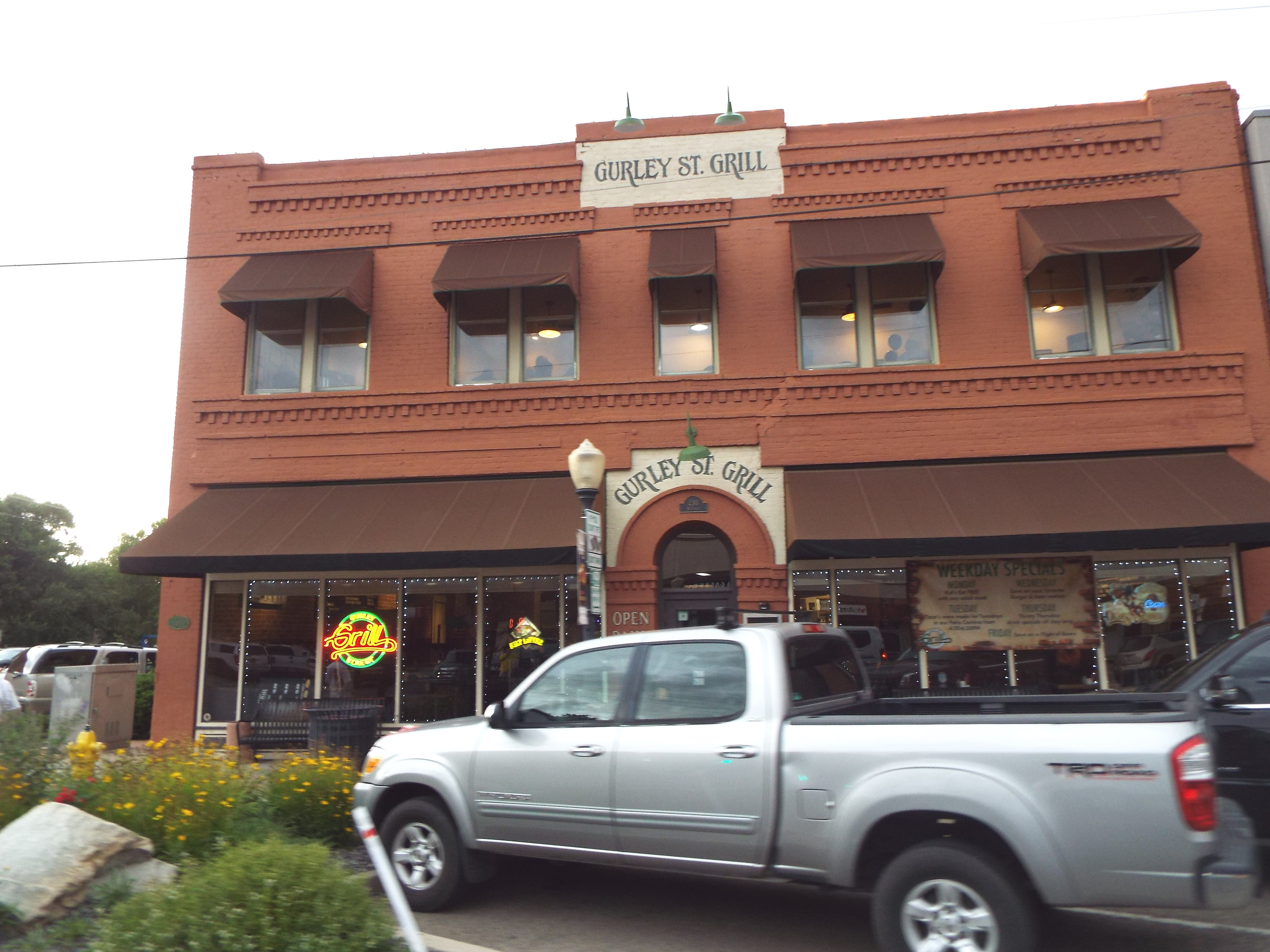
Mulvenon Building

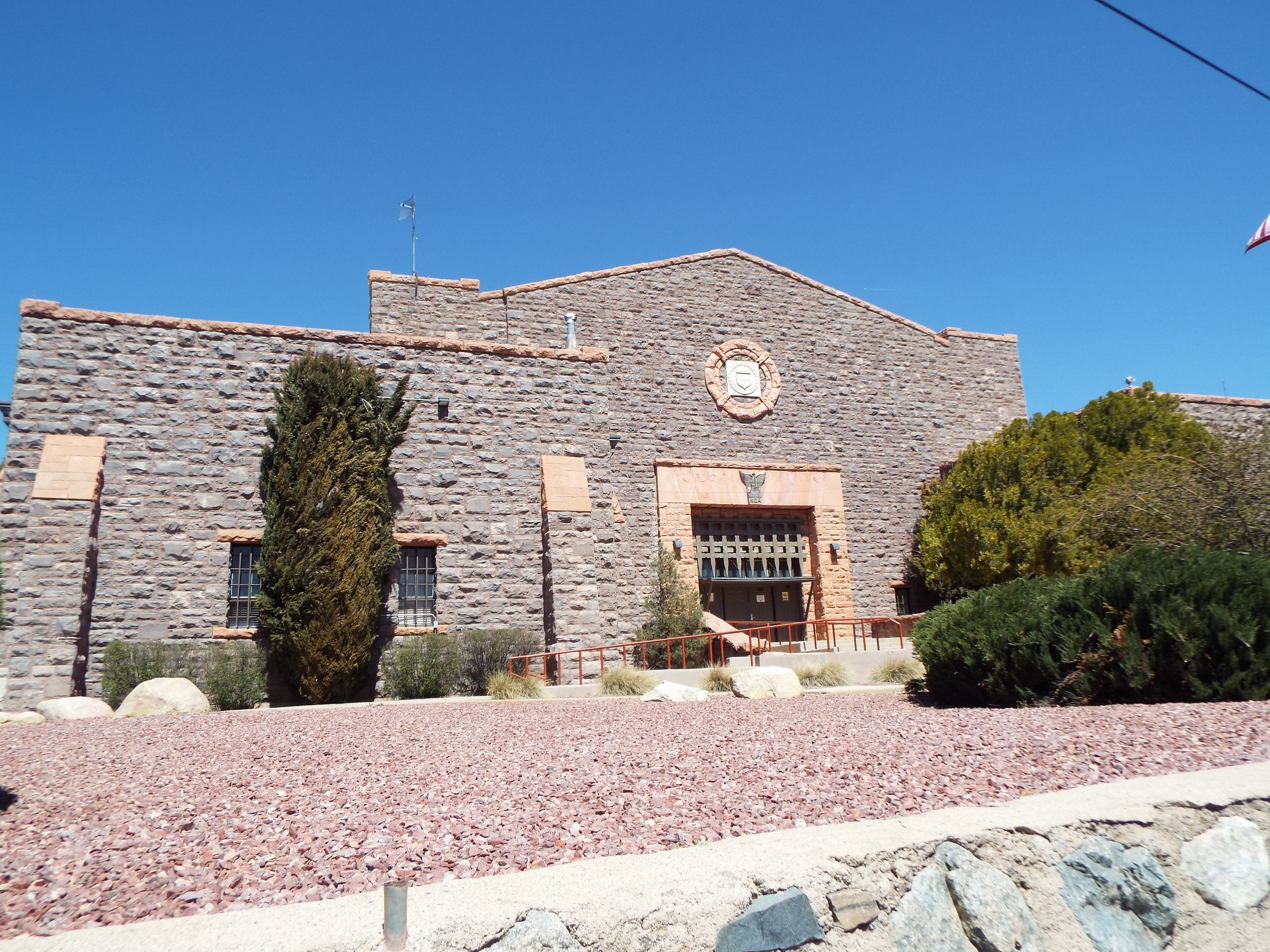
Prescott National Guard Armory

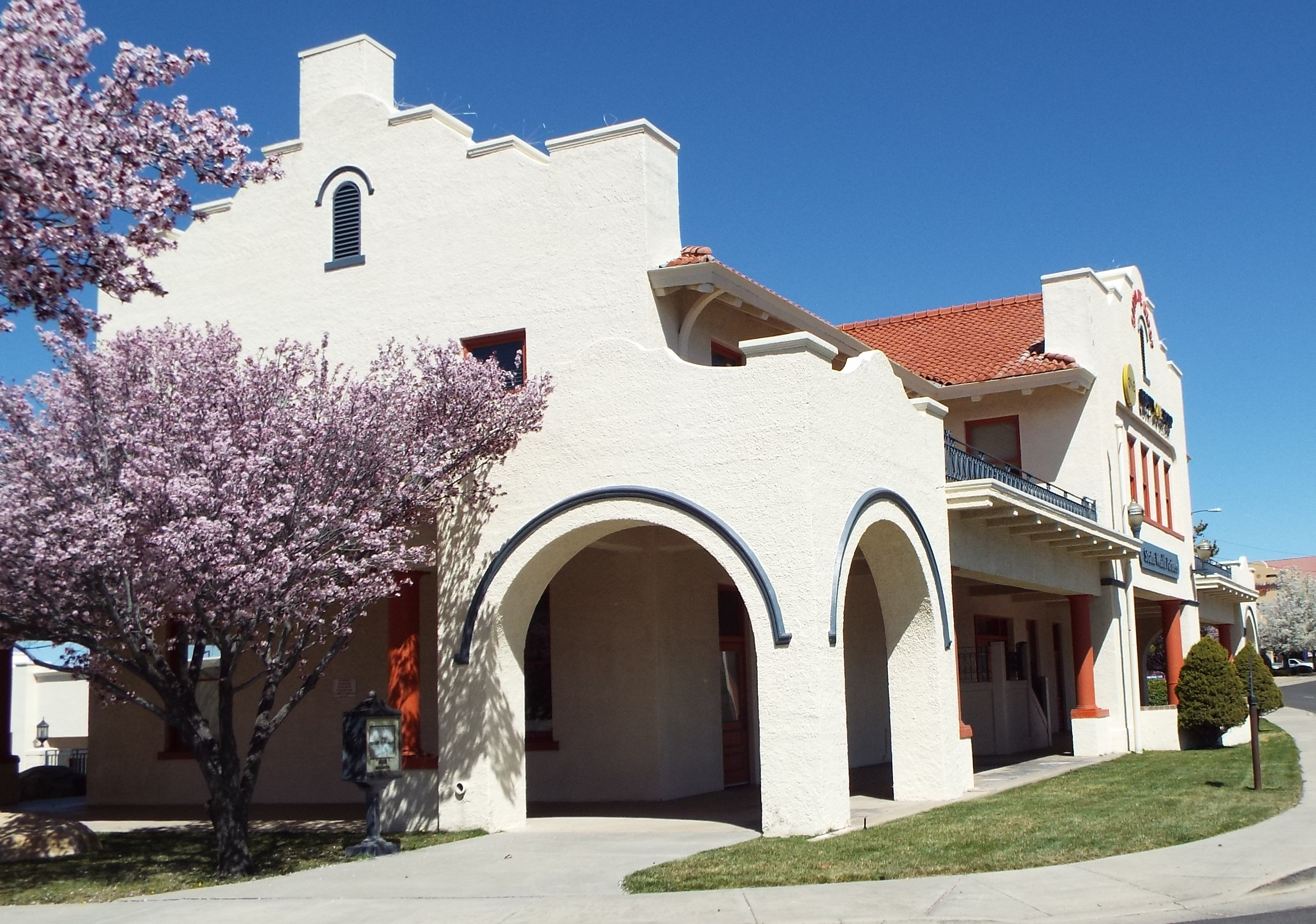
Santa Fe, Prescott and Phoenix Railroad Depot

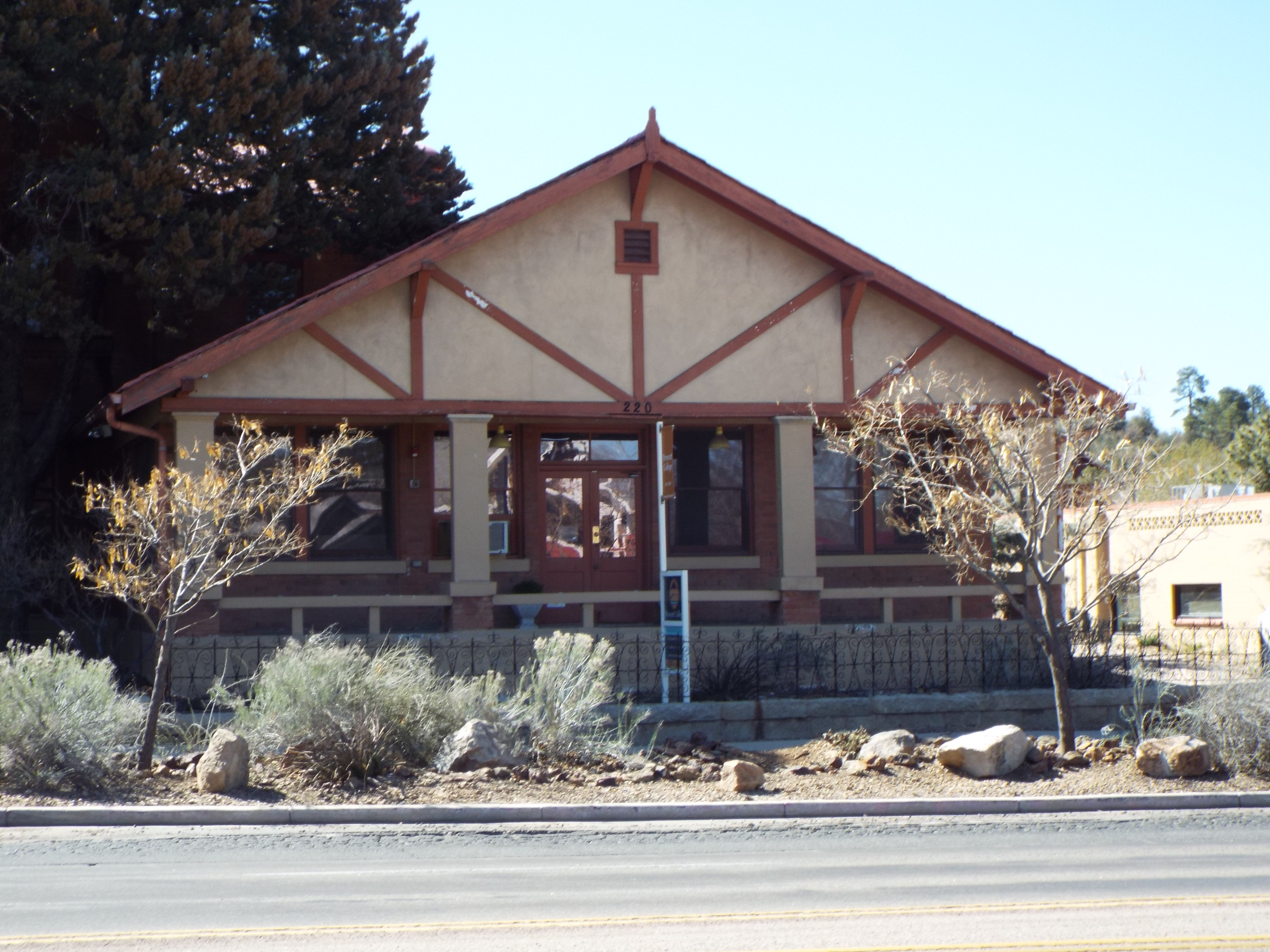
Sisters of Mercy Hospital and Convent

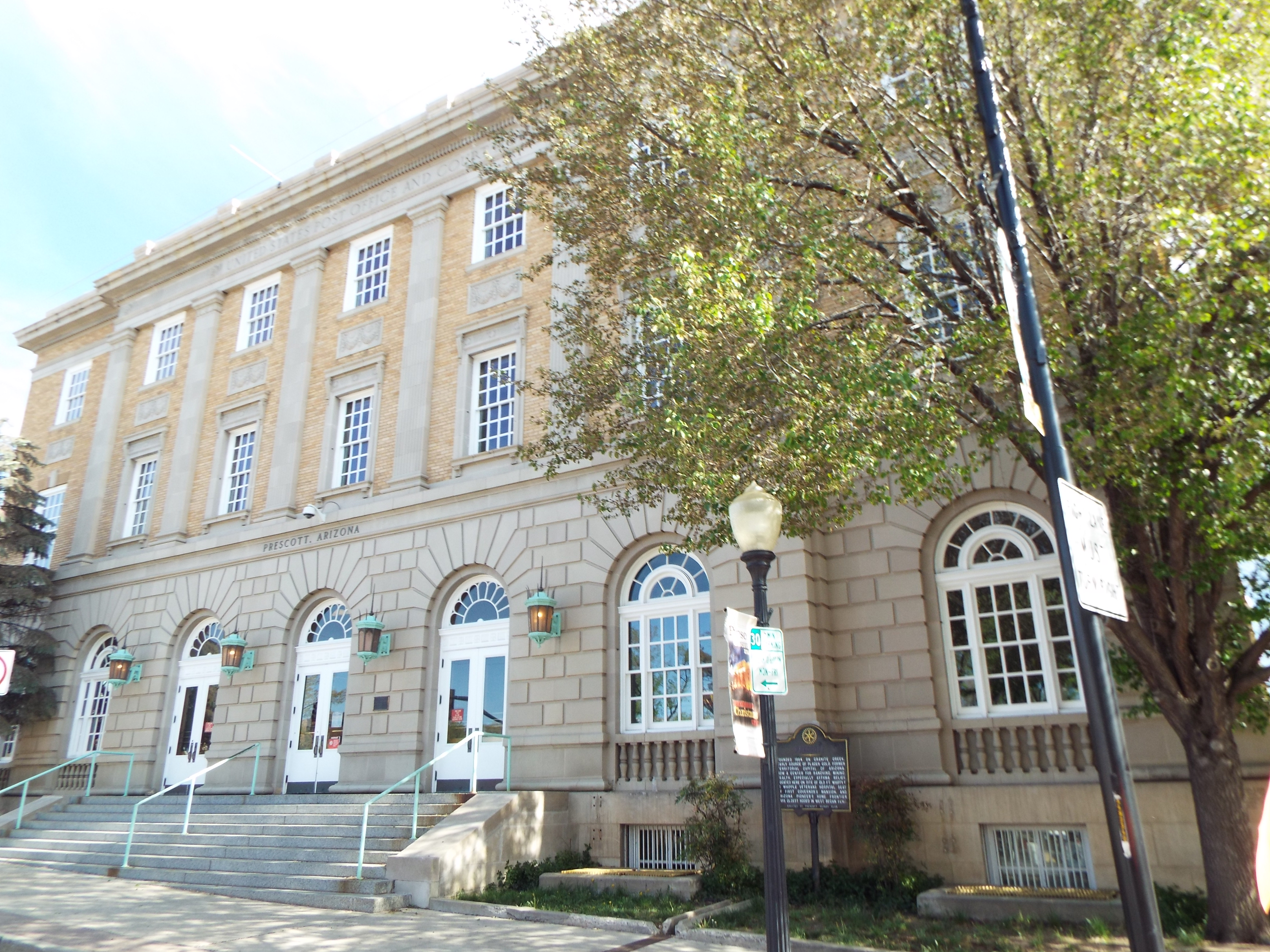
United States Post Office and Courthouse

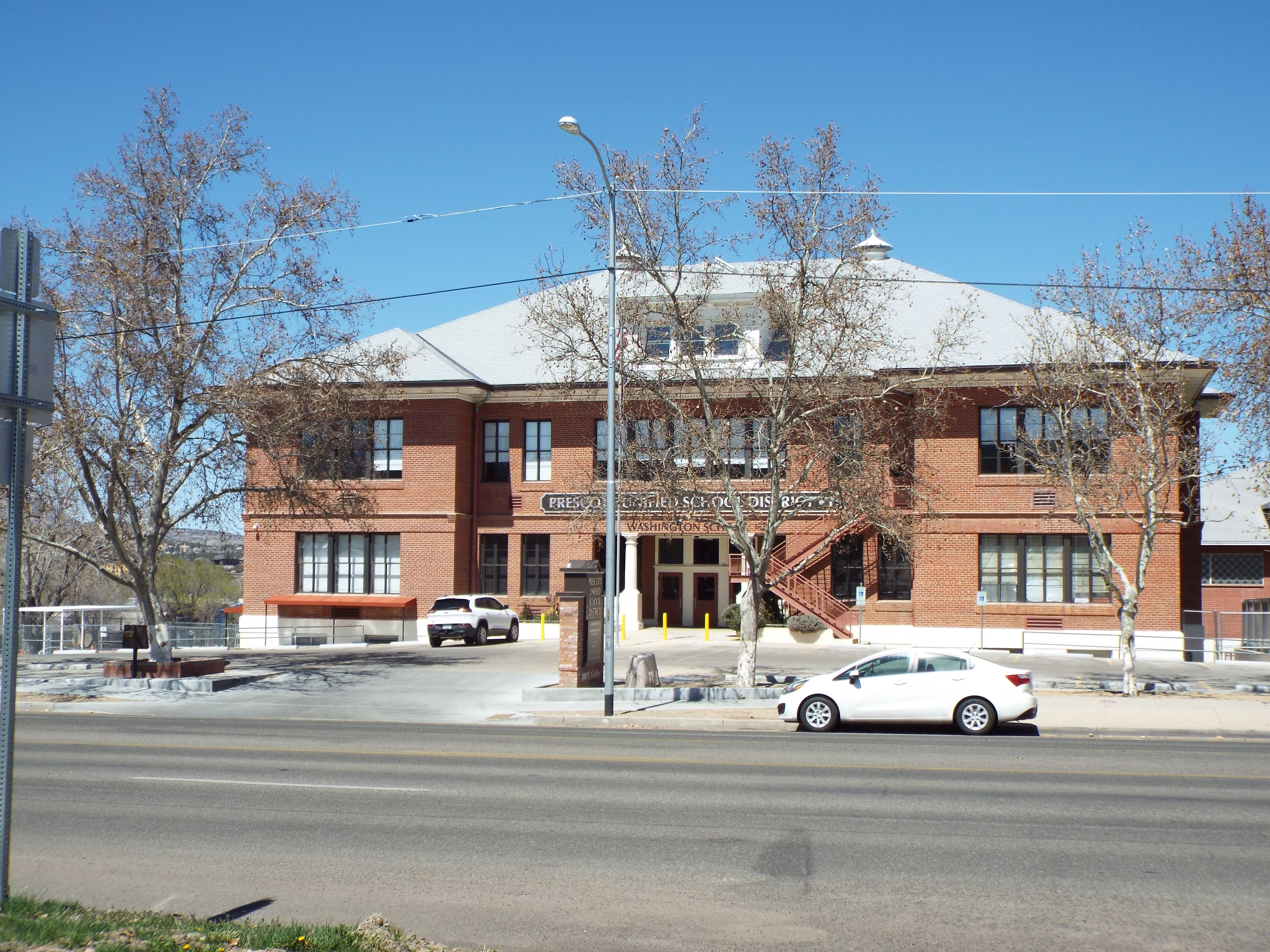
Washington Traditional School

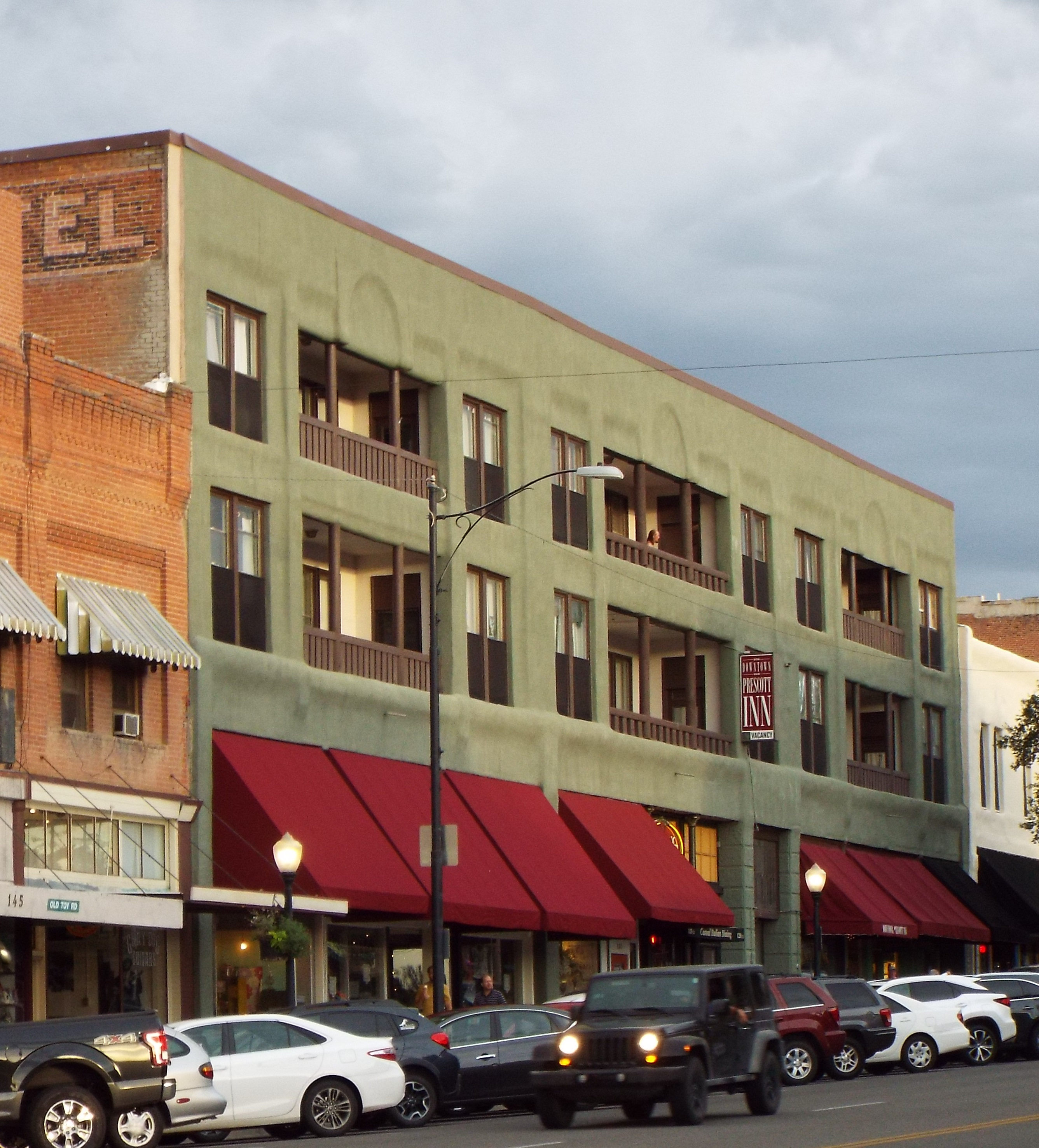
The A.J. Head Hotel

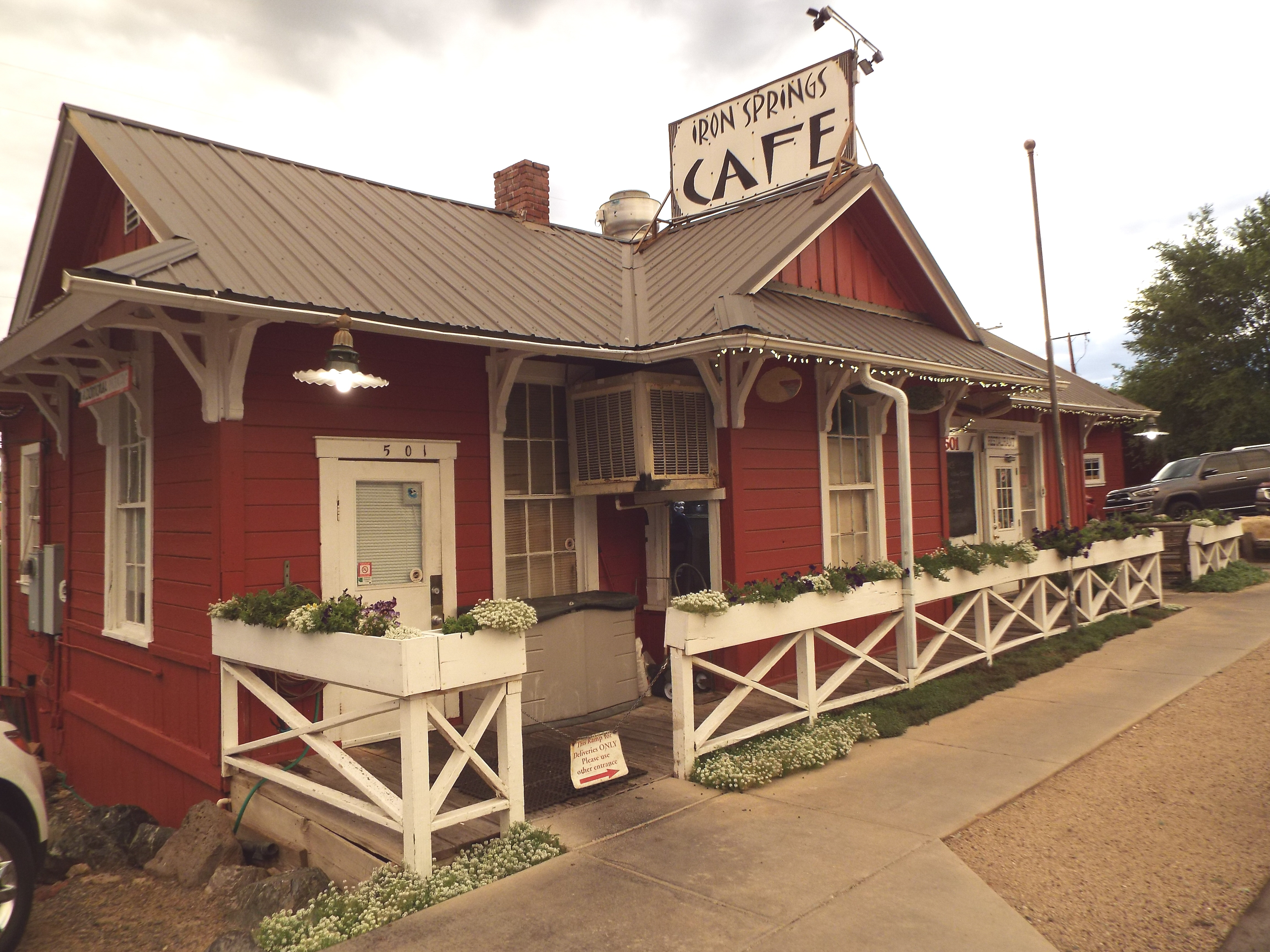
Santa Fe, Prescott and Phoenix Railway Depot (1894) – (now the Iron Café)

=== Courthouse Plaza Historic District buildings ===
In 1907, a statue of William "Buckey" O'Neill was placed in the historic Courthouse Plaza. The following are contributing structures of historical significance within the Courthouse Plaza Historic District.

- The Yavapai County Courthouse – built in 1916 and located on the Courthouse Plaza. Listed in the National Register of Historic Places on April 13, 1977, reference #77000241.
- The Prescott Gas and Electric Company (1875)/ Masonic Temple (1907) – built in 1875 and located at 107 N. Cortez Street.
- The Bank of Arizona – built in 1877 and located on the SE Corner of Gurley & Cortez Streets.
- A.G. Dunn's Butcher Shop – built in 1890 Bashford Block) and located on the NW Corner of Gurley & Cortez Streets.
- Bashford Burnister Building/Balentine Building built in 1901 and located on the NE Corner of Gurley & Montezuma St.
- The Grand Highland Hotel was built in 1903 and is located at 154 S. Montezuma St. It is a contributing building in the Courthouse Plaza Historic District.
- The Palace Hotel built in 1901 at 120 S. Montezuma Street.
- The D. Levy Mercantile Building built in 1901 and located at 112 South Montezuma Street.
- Hotel St. Michael was built in 1901 and located at 205 W. Gurley St. Prior to the 1900 fire which destroyed many of the buildings in Whiskey Row, the hotel was originally named the Burke Hotel. In 1925, the hotel installed an Otis Traction Elevator.
- The Knights of Pythias Building built in 1892 and located at 105 S. Cortez Street.
- The Prescott National Bank Building built in 1902 and located on the Corner of Gurley and Cortez Streets.
- Bashford Courts built in 1888 and located at 130 W. Gurley Street is a contributing building in the Courthouse Plaza Historic District.
- The United States Post Office and Courthouse built in 1931 and located at 101 W Goodwin St. Not only is the building a contributor in the Courthouse Plaza Historic District, It was also listed in the National Register of Historic Places on December 3, 1985, ref: 85003108.
- The Prescott Jail and Firehouse built in 1895 and located at 117 W Goodwin Street is a Romanesque/Classical Revival building. The fire station was located on the first floor and the City jail on the second. The building is a contributing building in the Courthouse Plaza Historic District. It now houses the Prescott Chamber of Commerce Tourist Information Center.
- The Olaf Helsa Clock built in 1920 and located in front of the Helsa Jewelry Store Clock in 113 W. Goodwin St. The clock is a contributing building in the Courthouse Plaza Historic District.
Courthouse Plaza Historic District structures

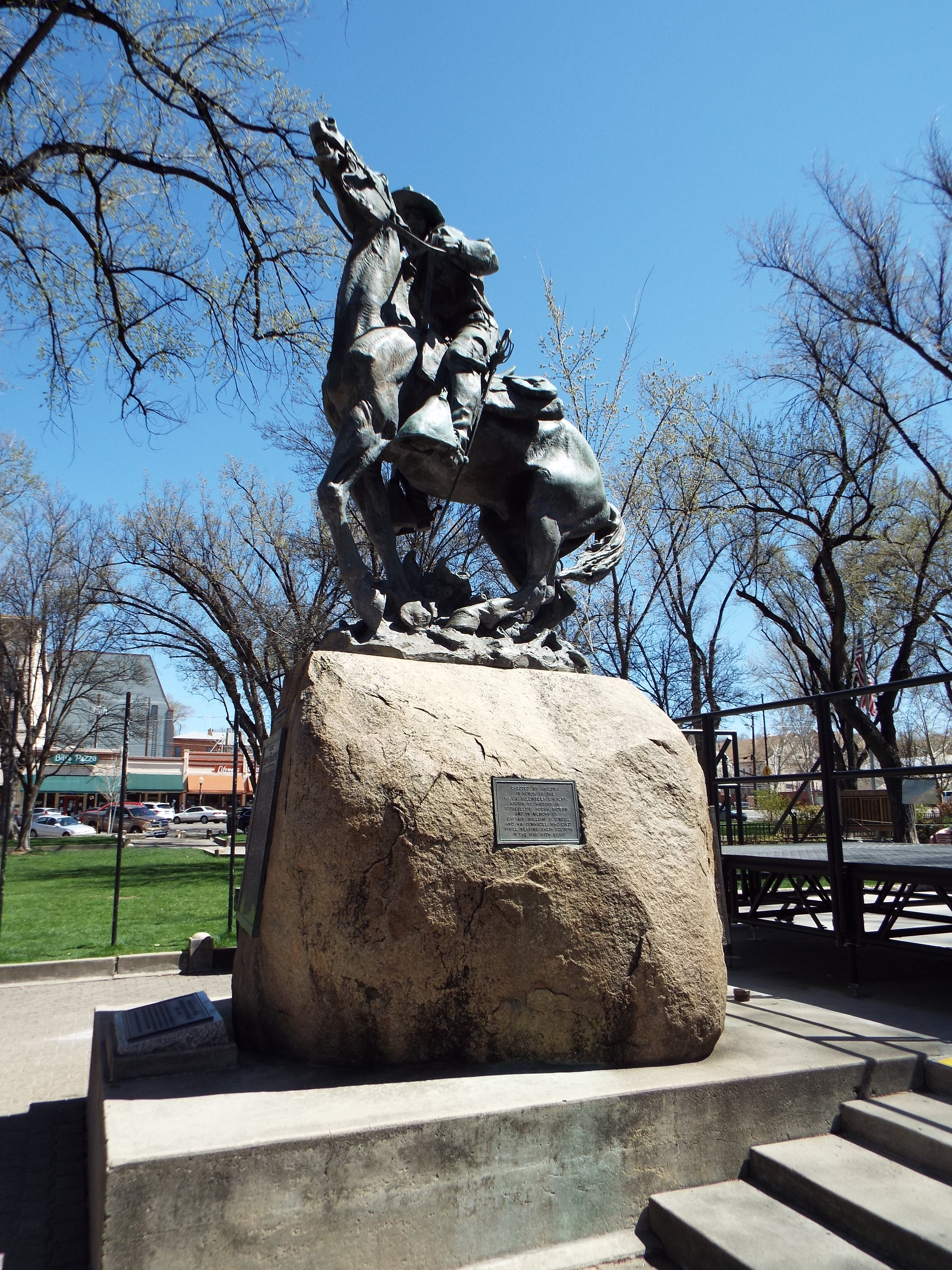
Statue of William "Buckey" O'Neill" dedicated in 1907 in the Courthouse Plaza

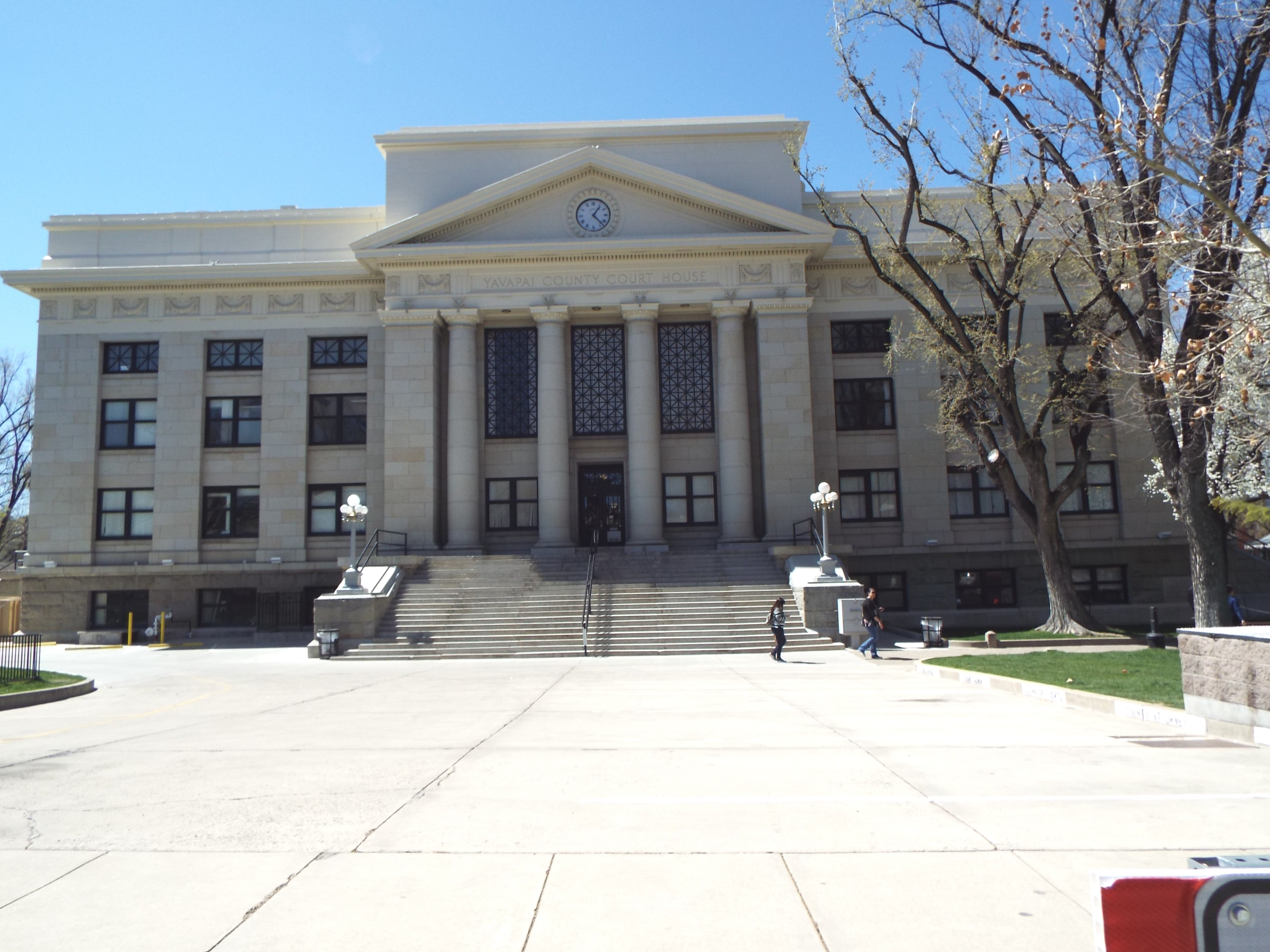
Yavapai County Courthouse

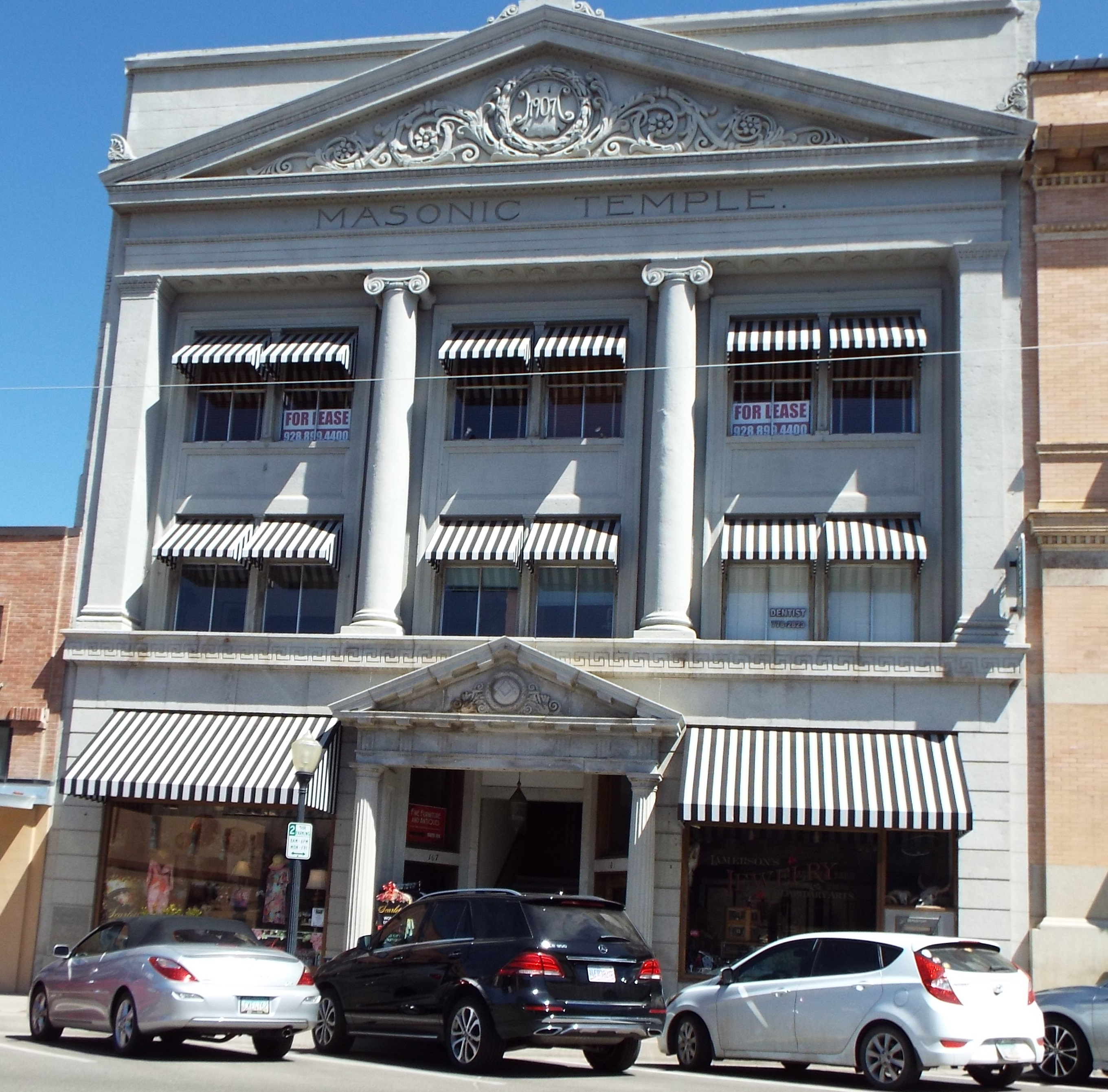
Prescott Gas and Electric Company-1875 – Masonic Temple

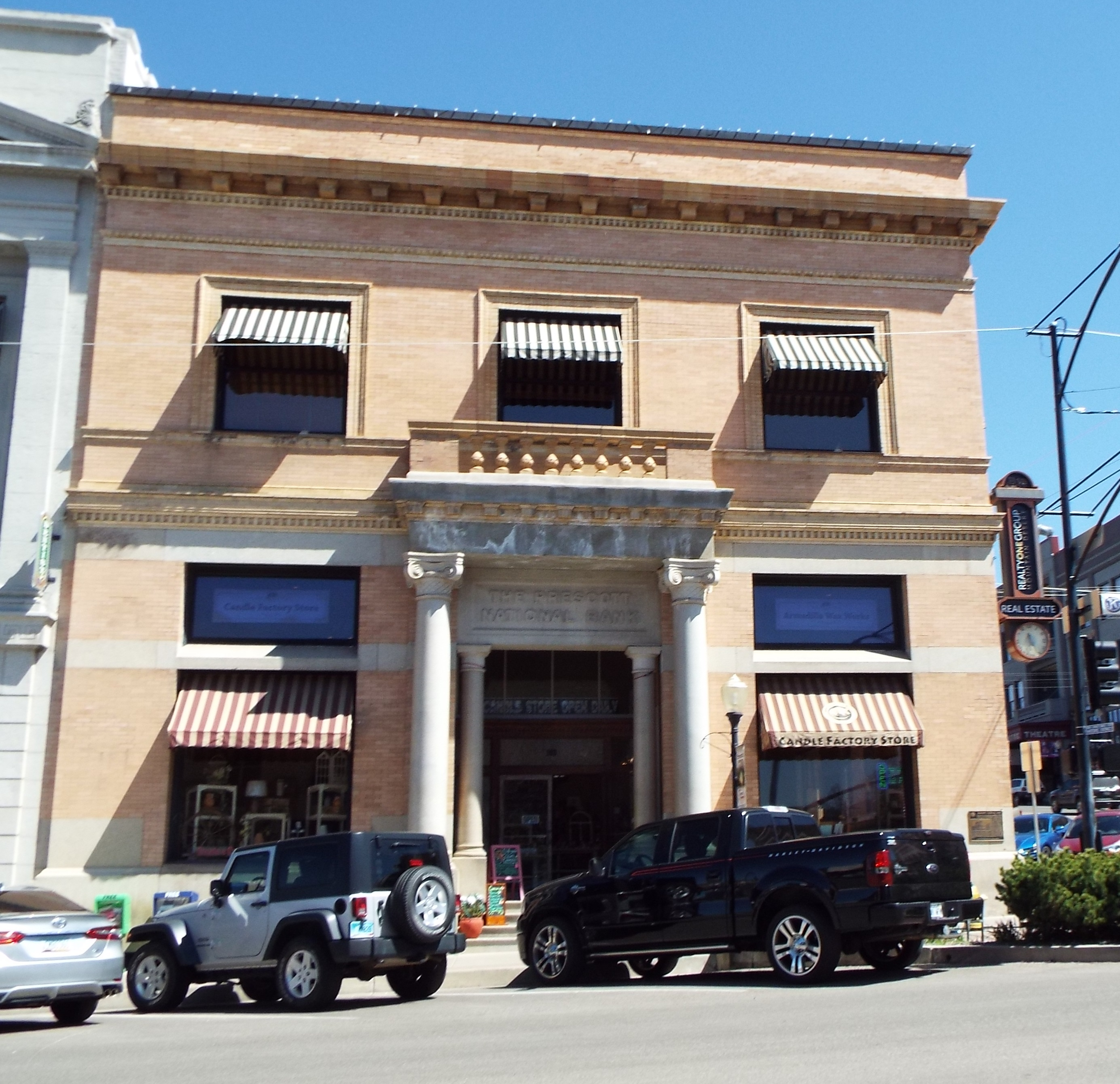
Bank of Arizona

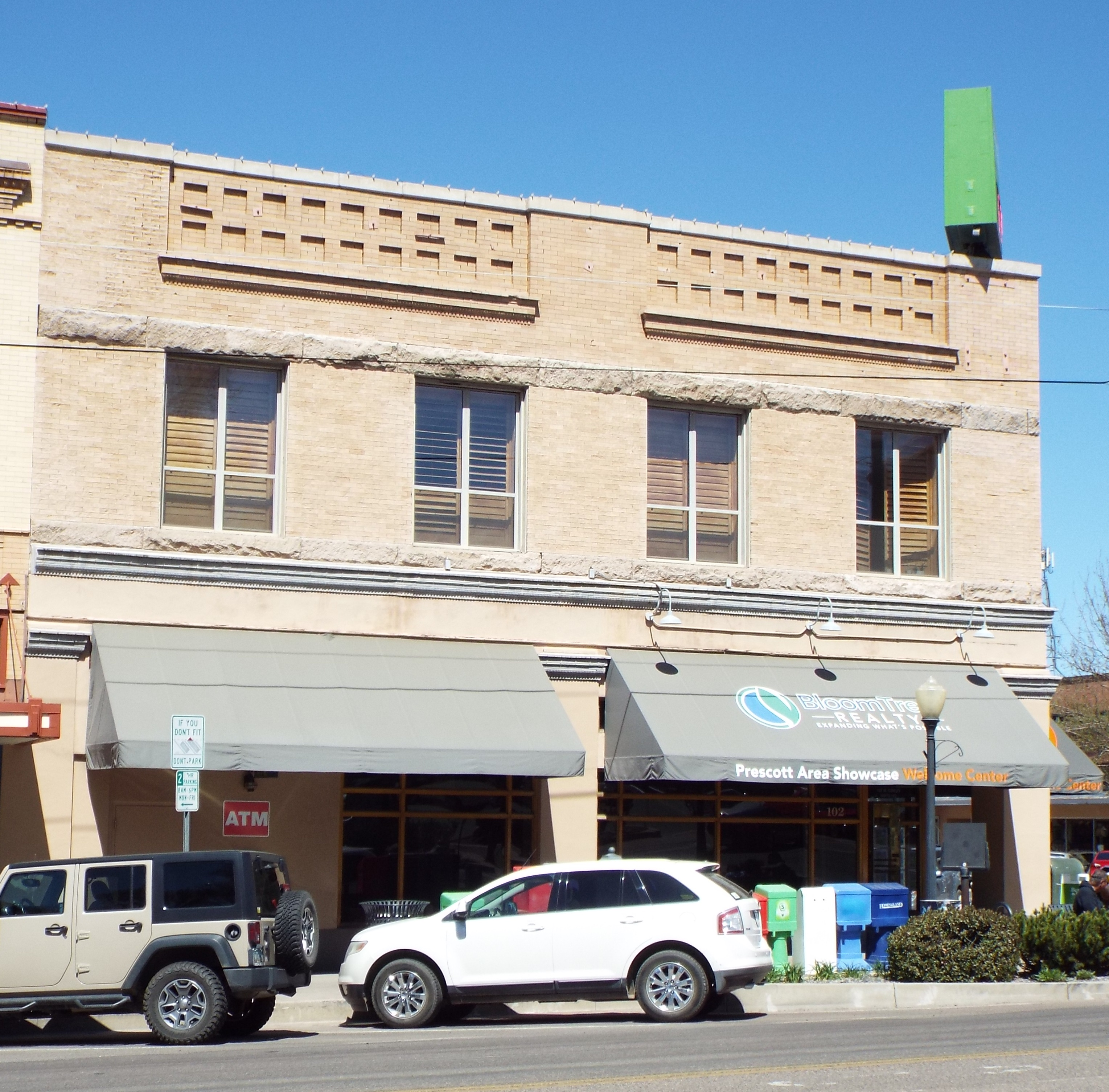
A.G. Dunn's Butcher Shop

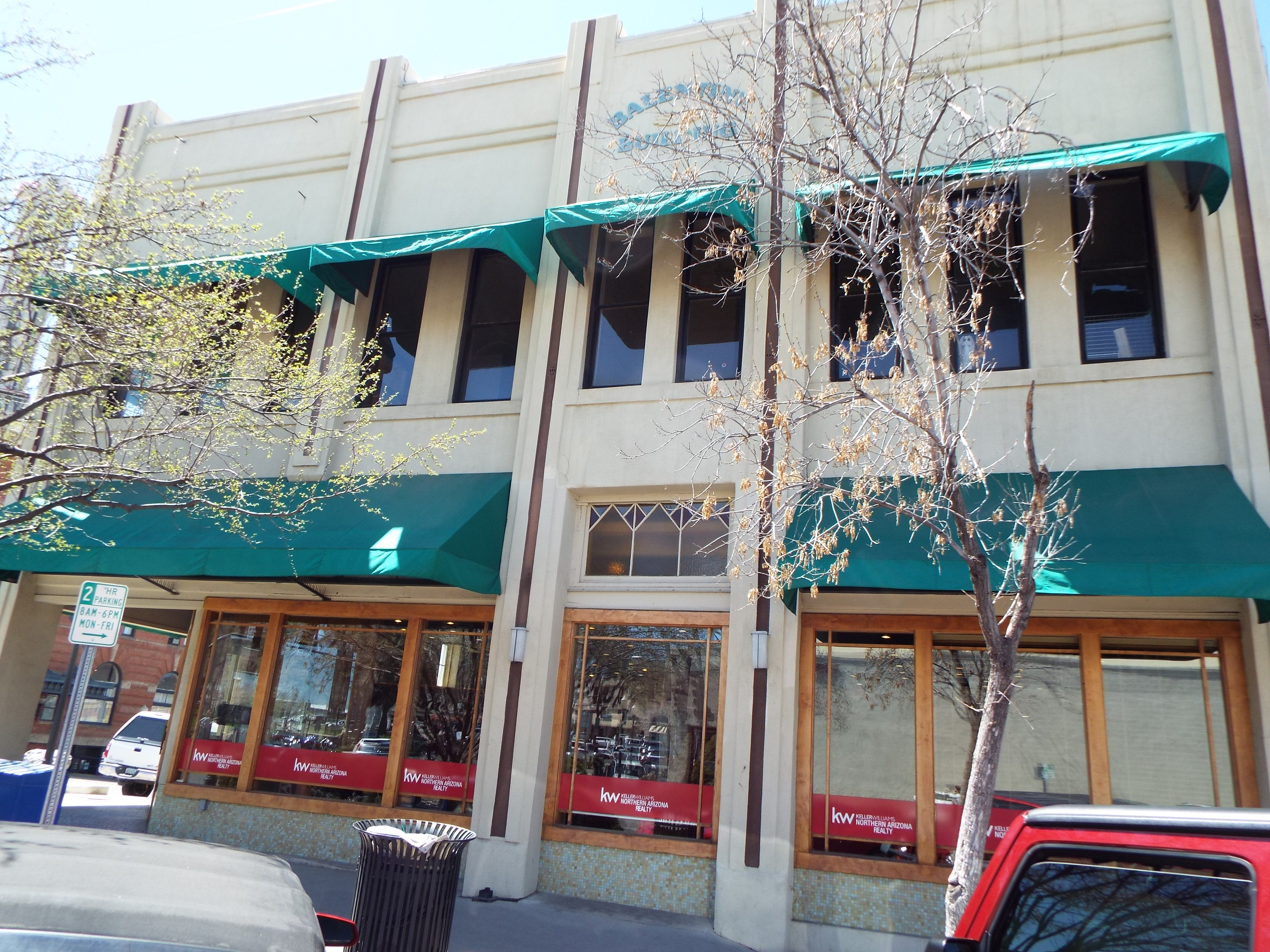
Bashford Burnister Building/Balentine Building

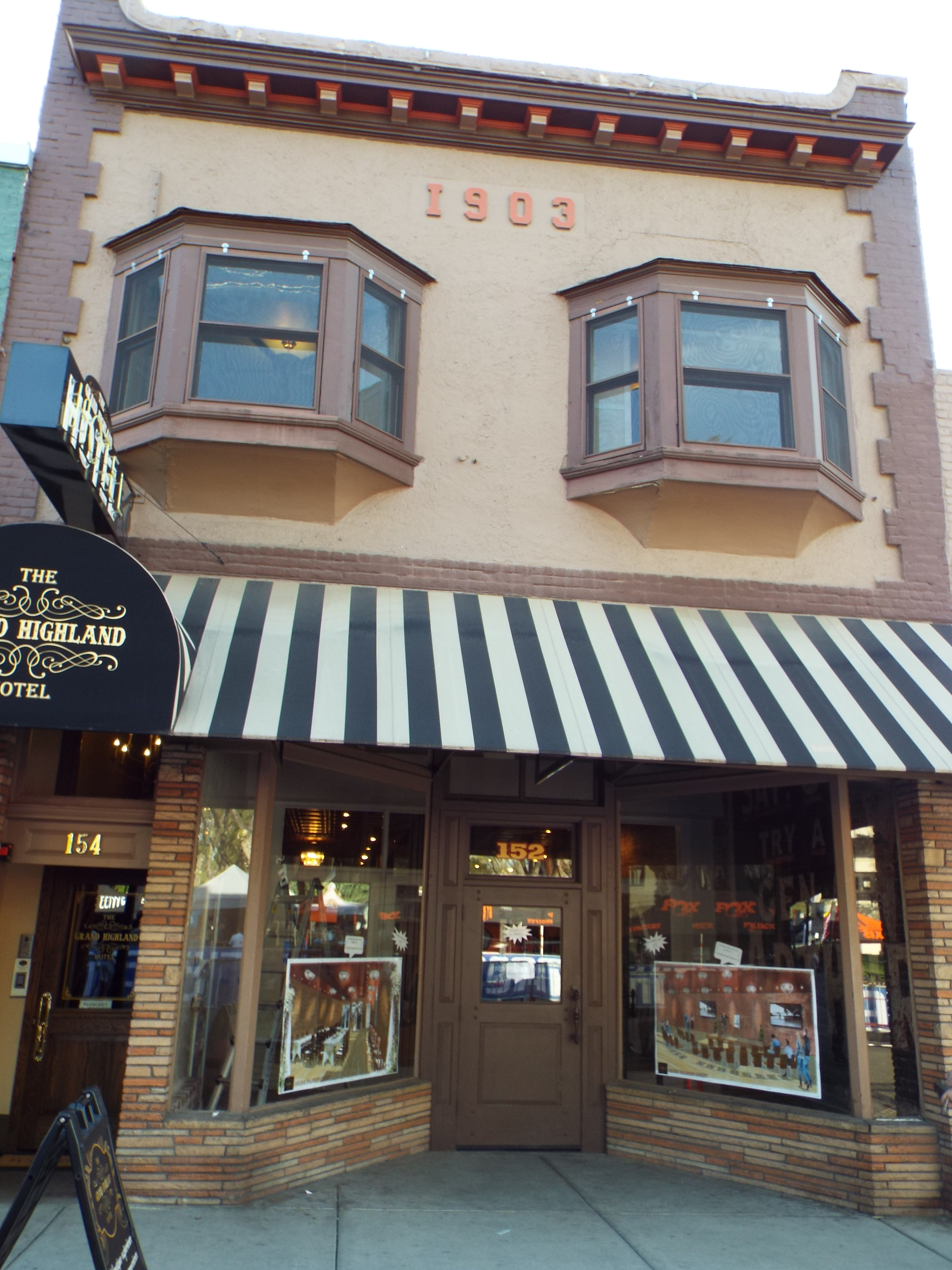
Grand Highland Hotel

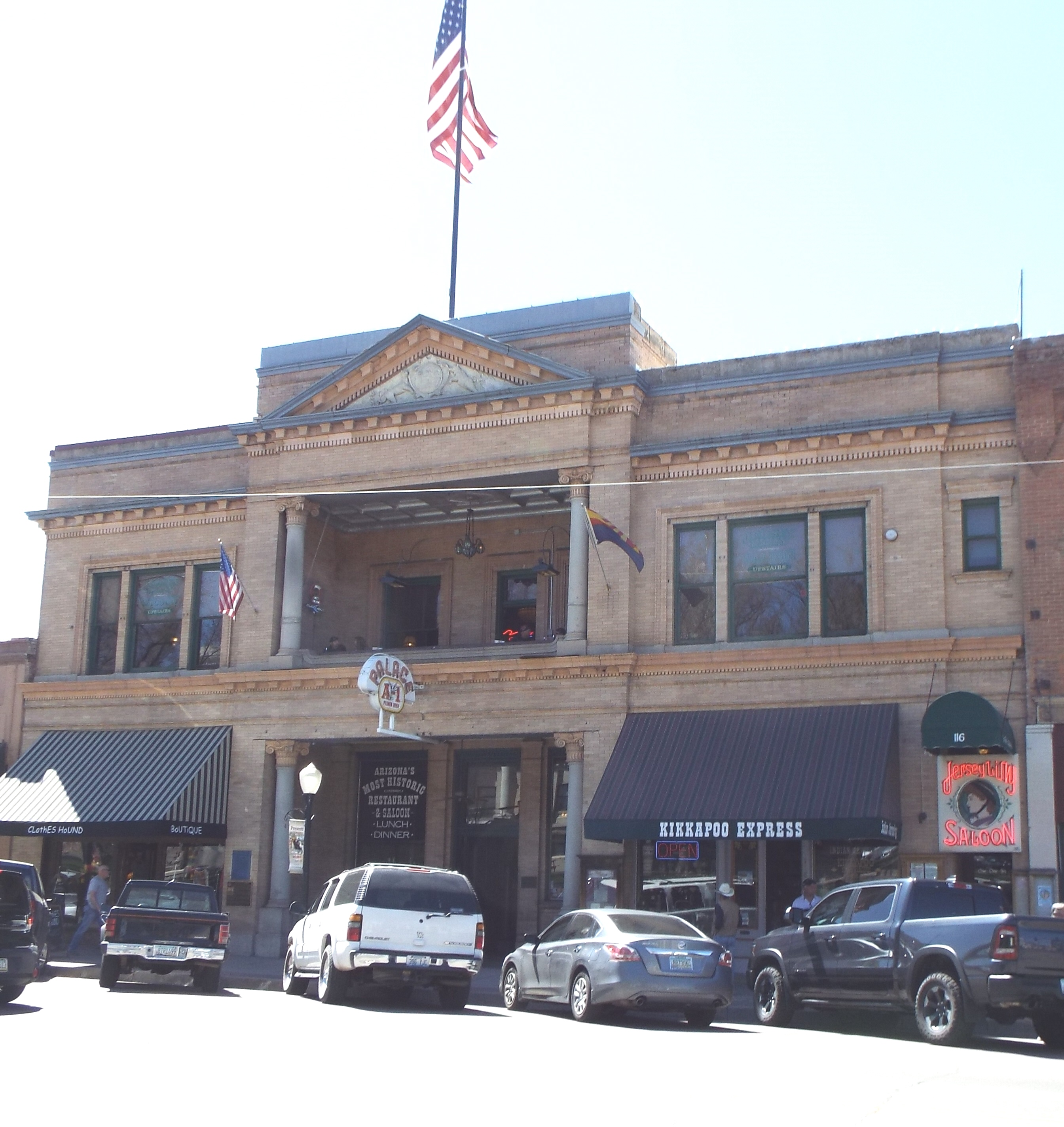
Palace Hotel 1901

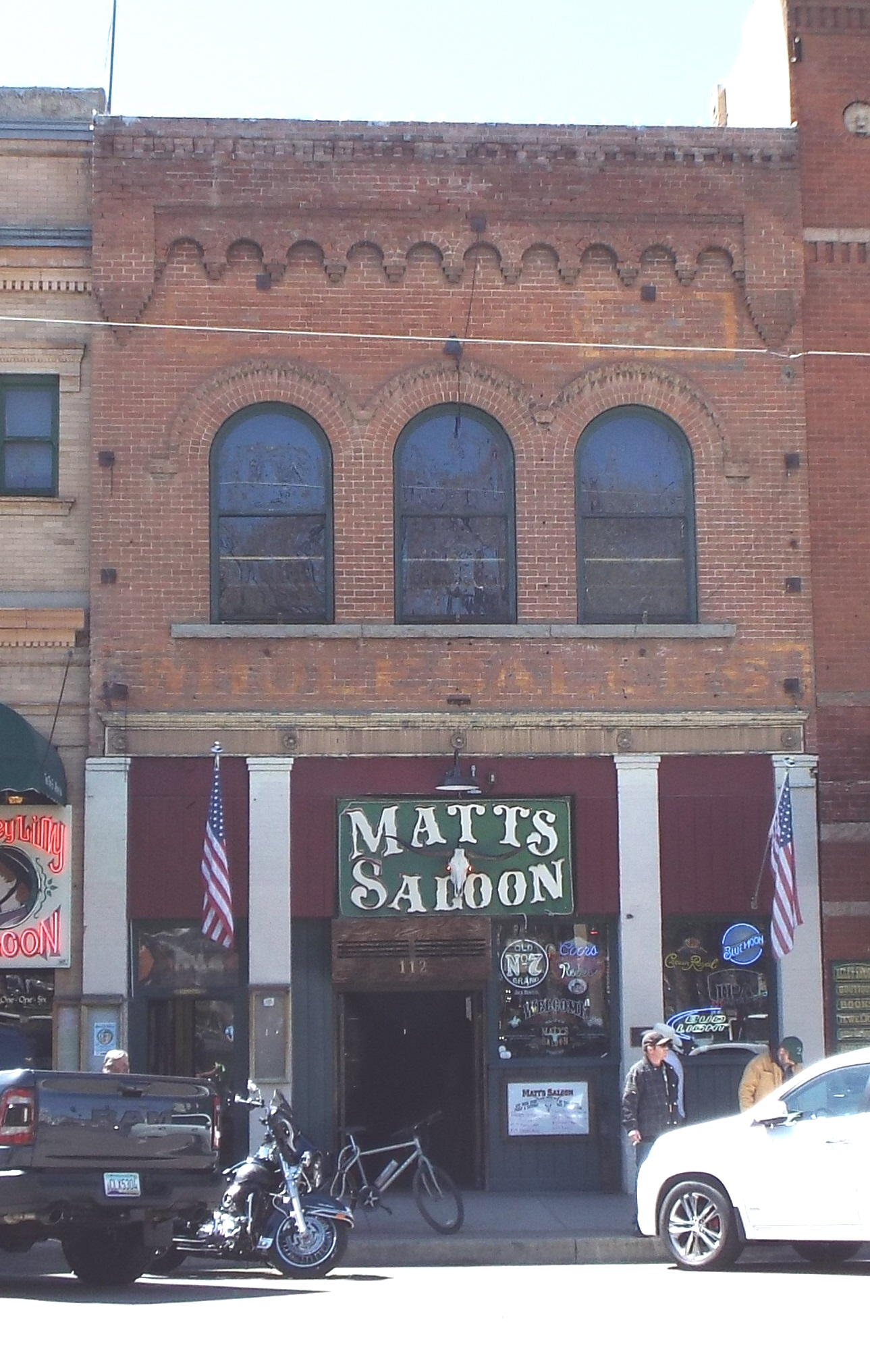
D. Levy Mercantile Building

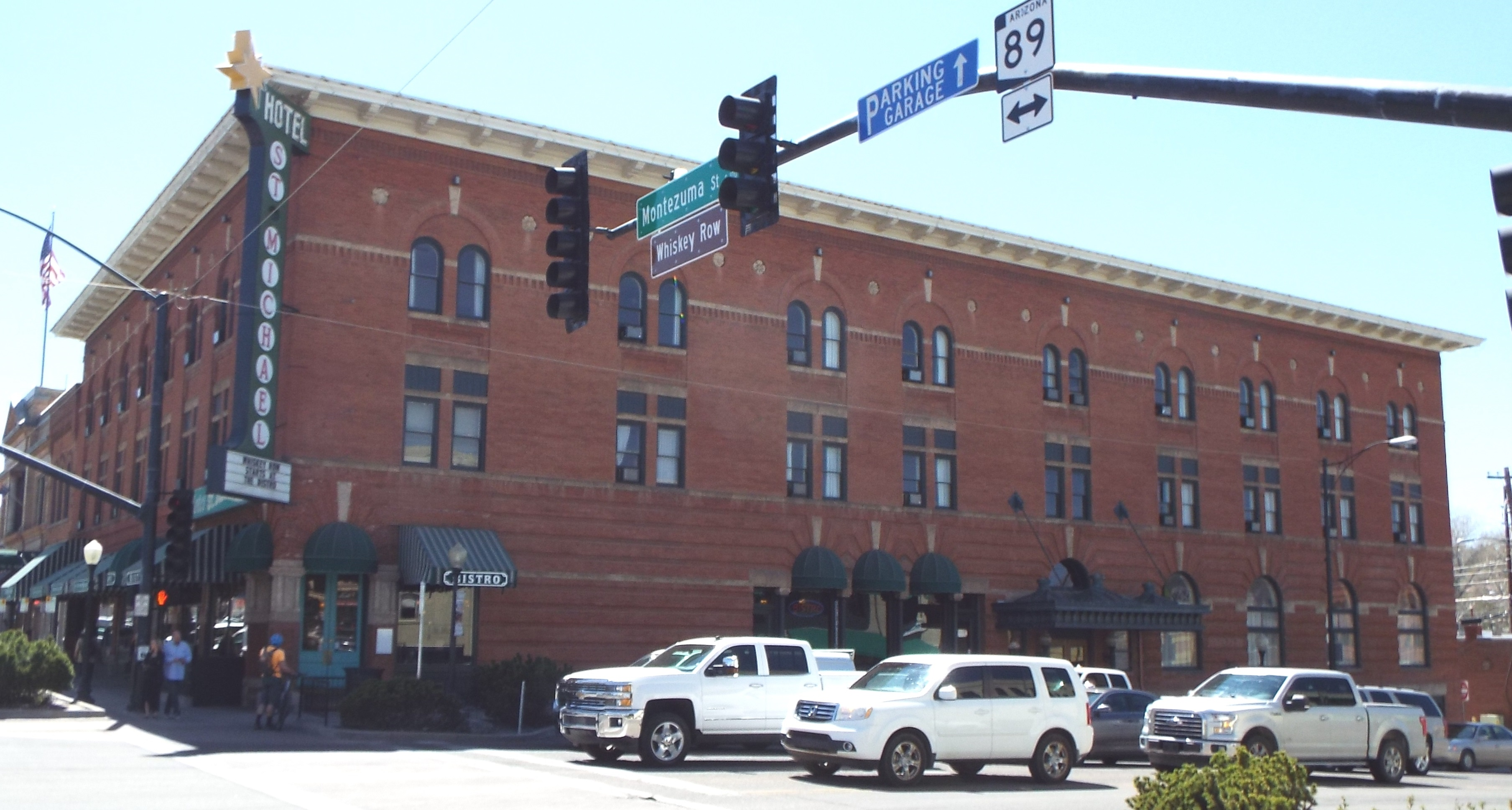
Hotel St. Michael

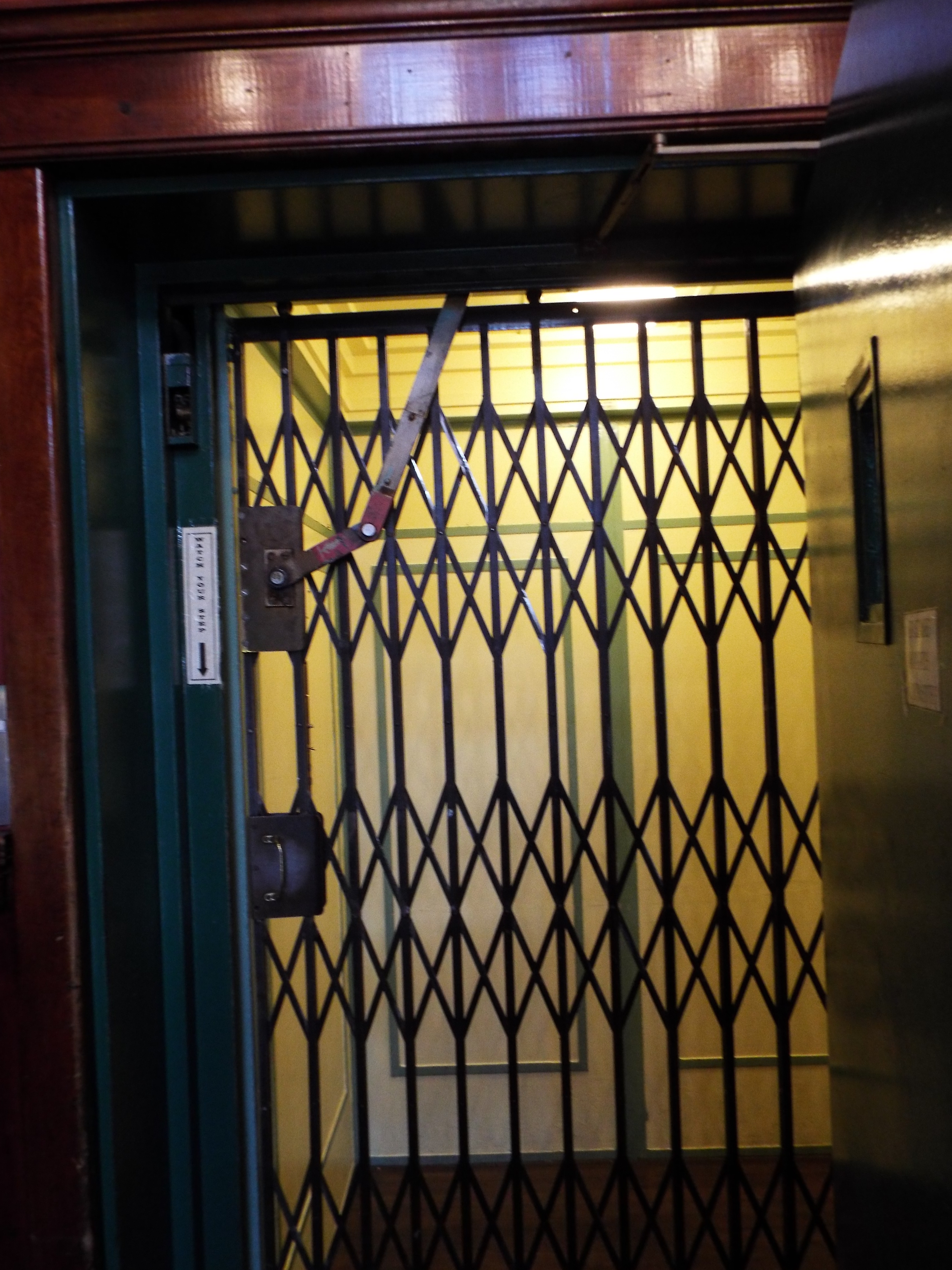
The 1925 Otis Traction Elevator

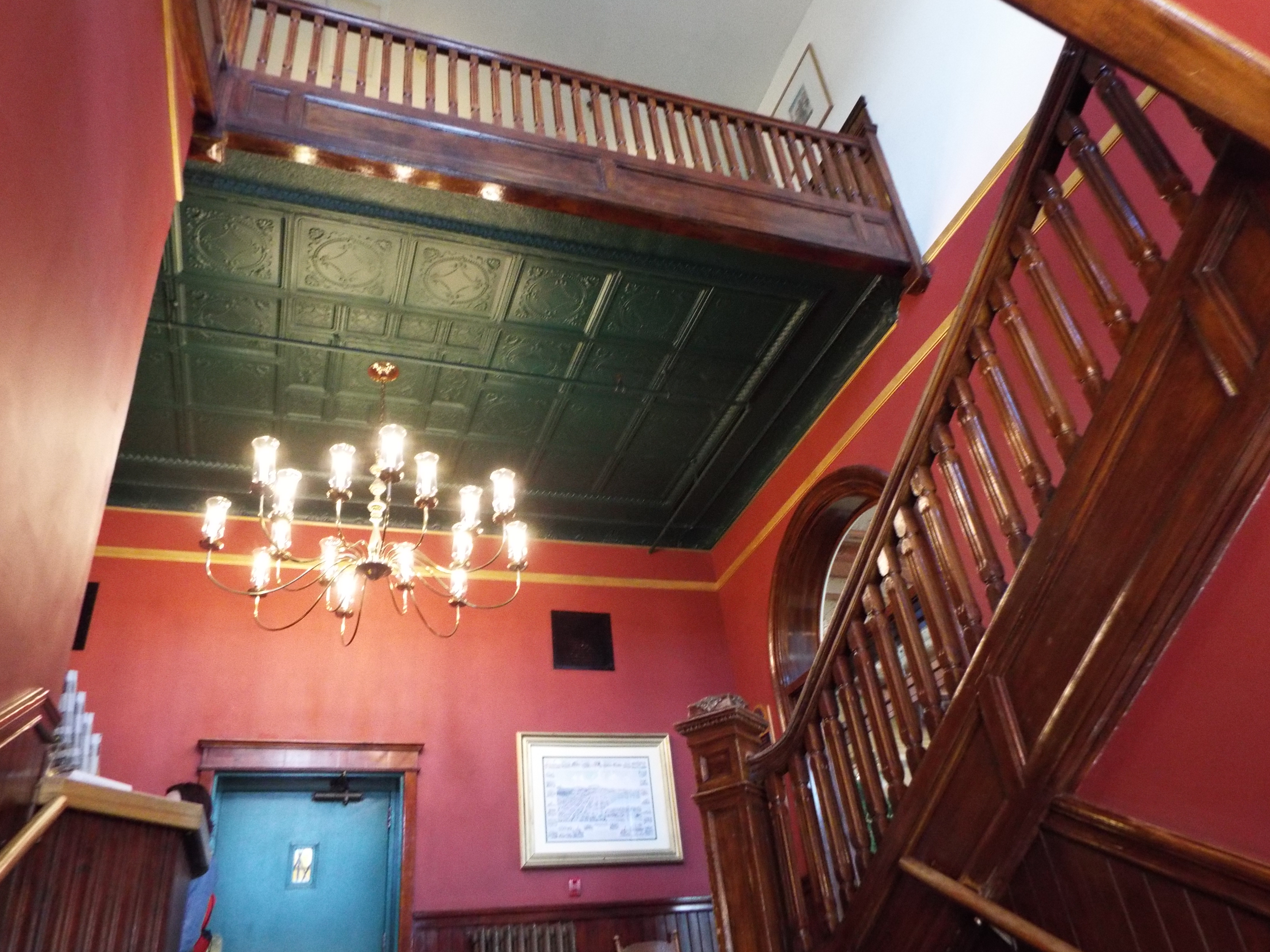
Inside the St. Michael Hotel

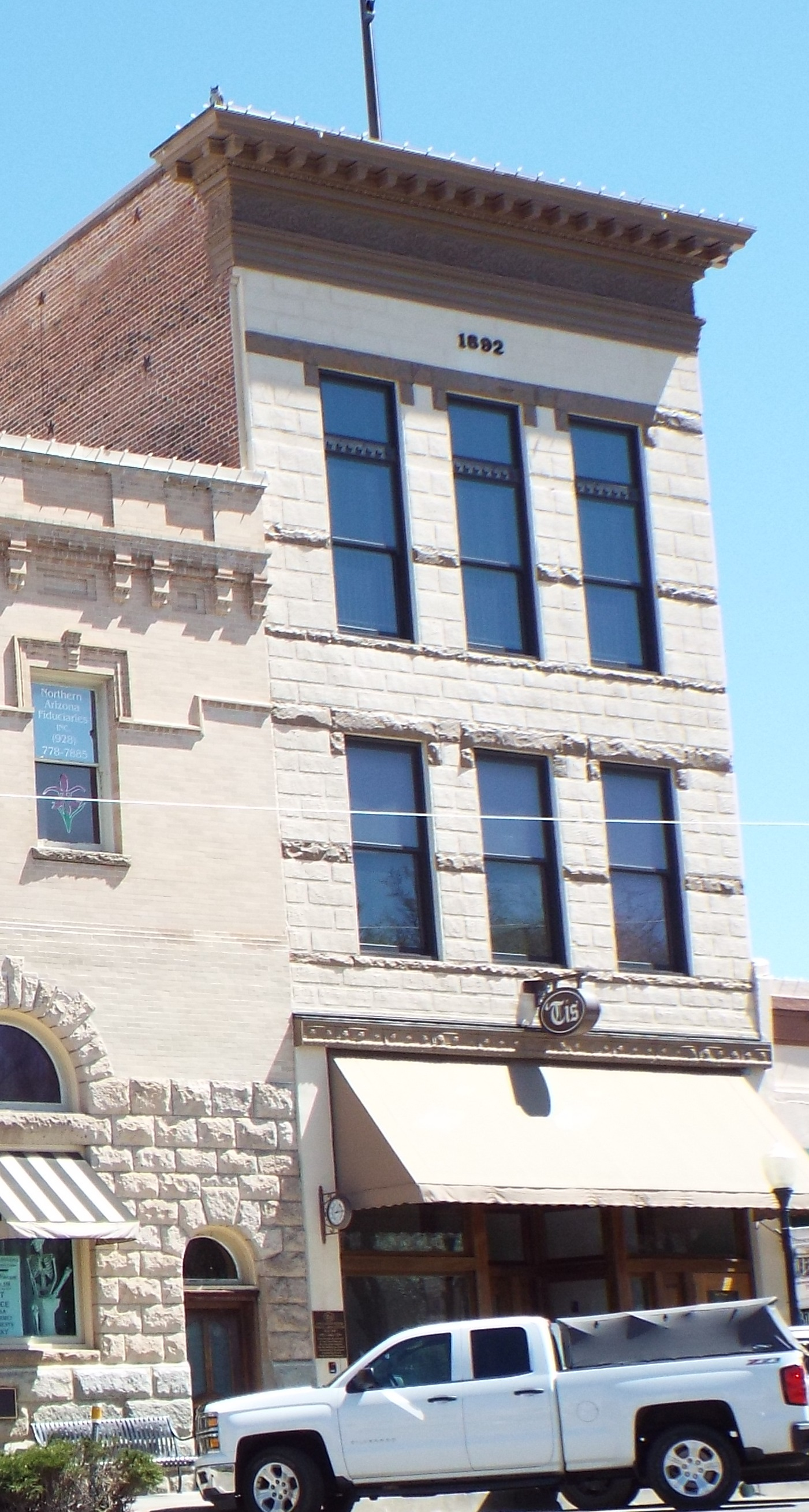
Knights of Pythias Building

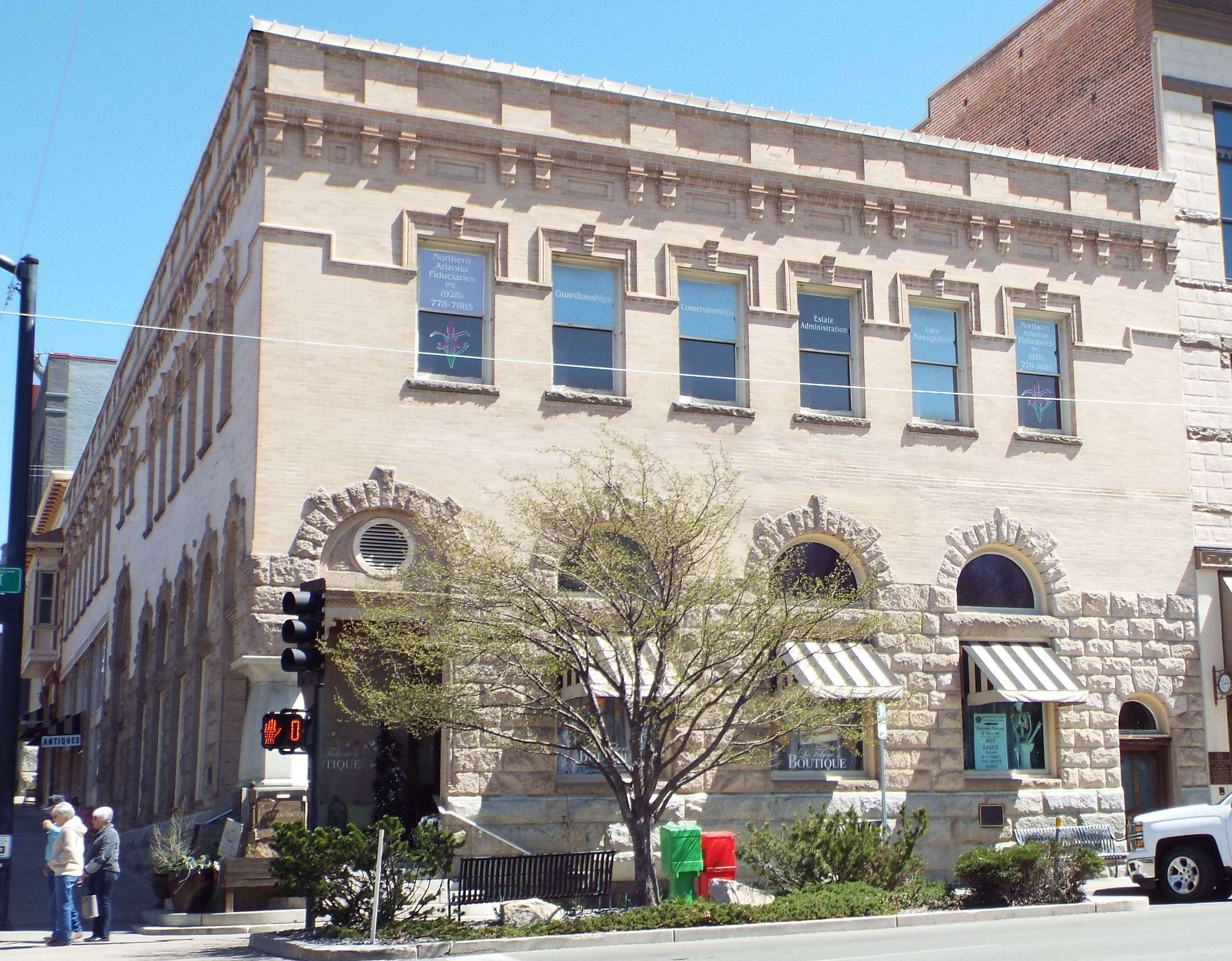
Prescott National Bank Building

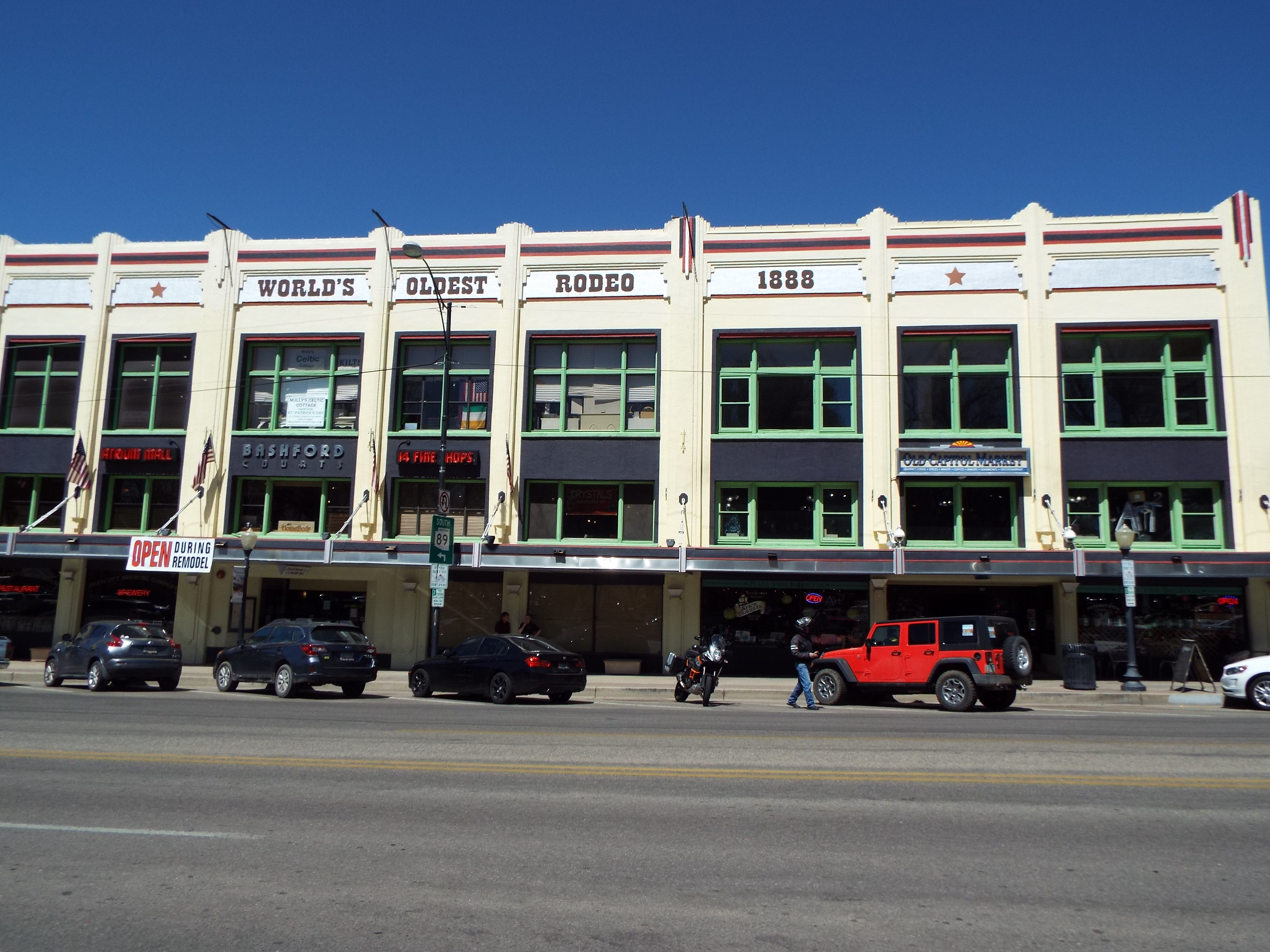
Bashford Courts

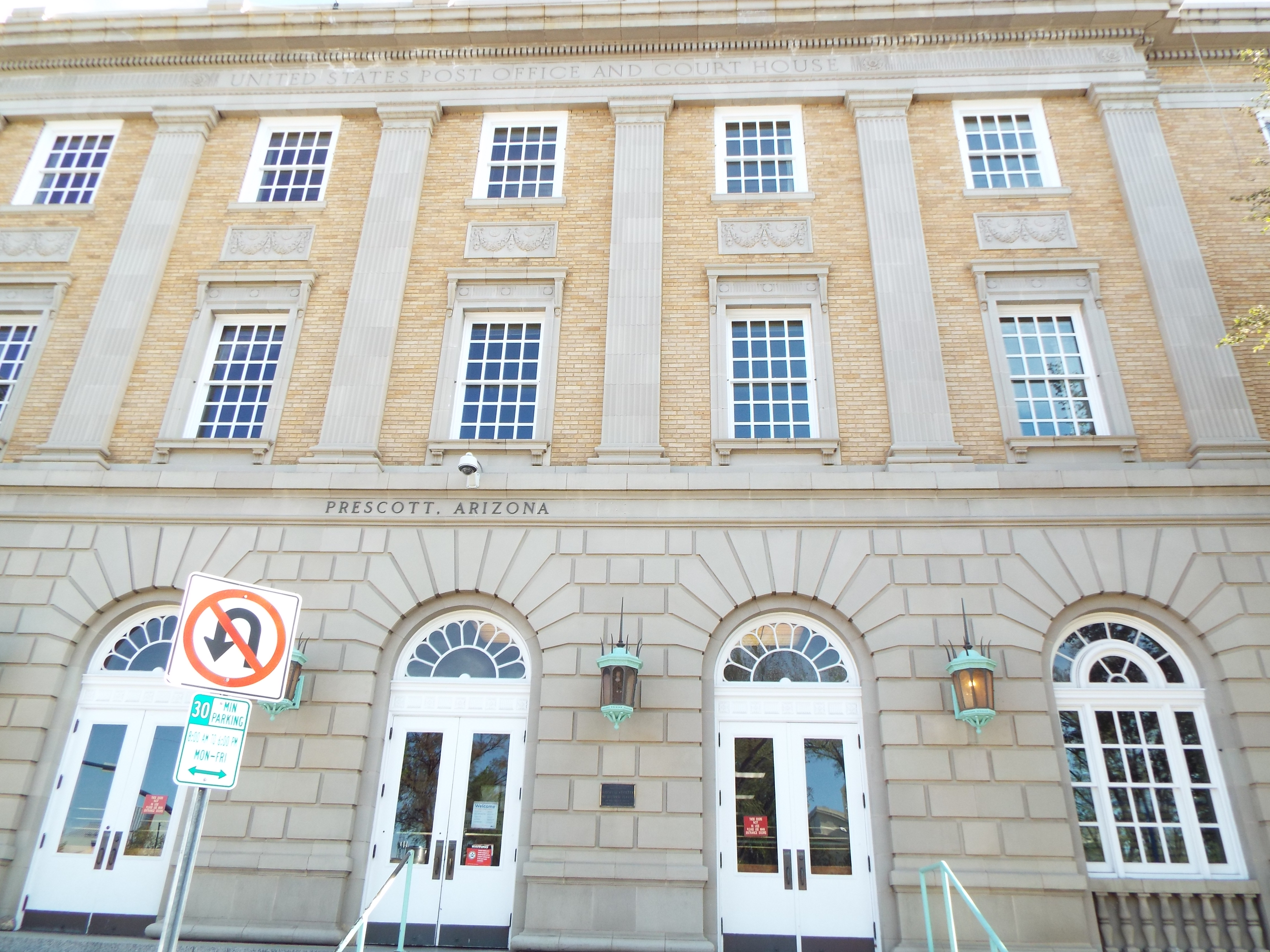
United States Post Office and Courthouse

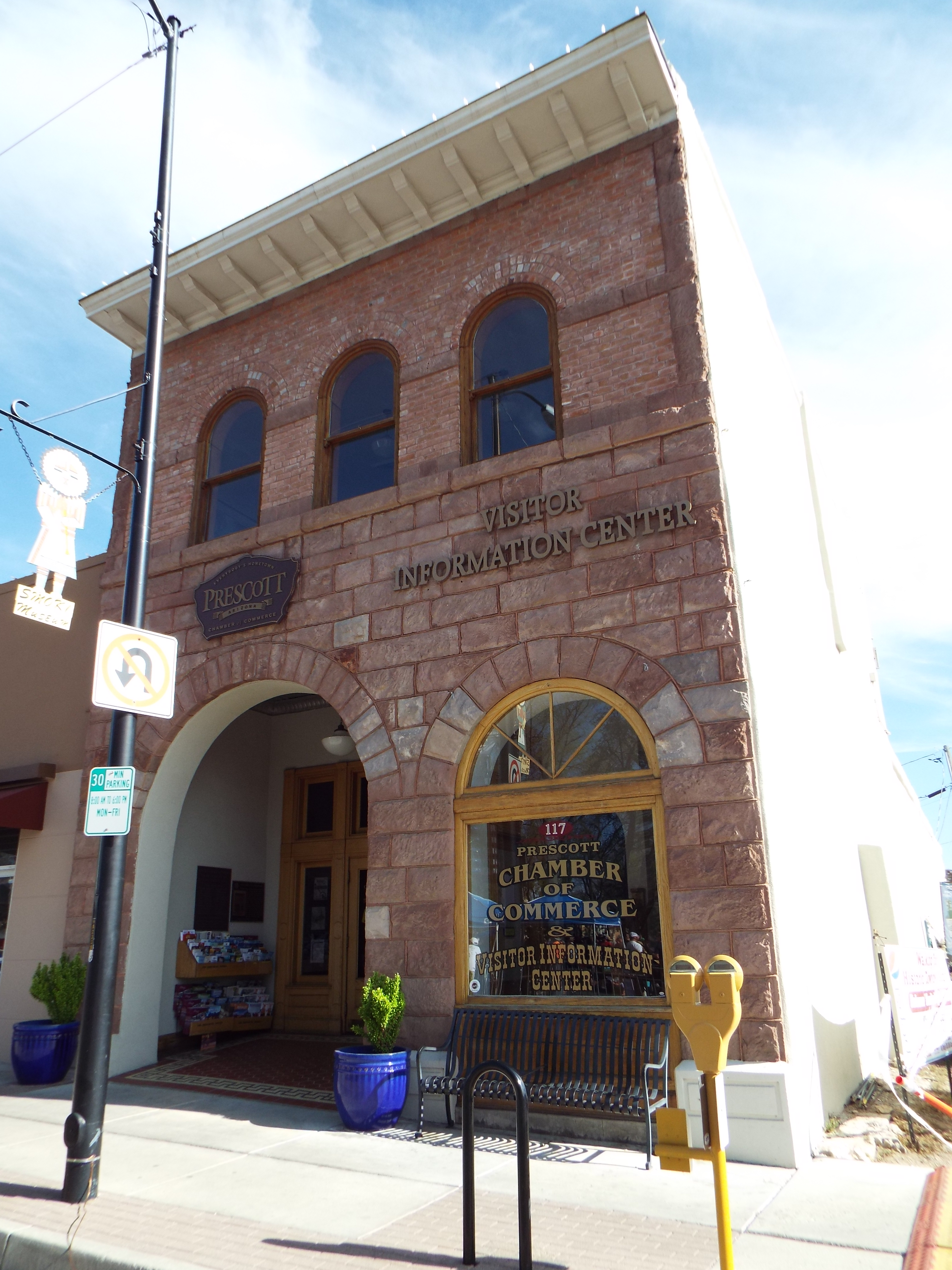
Prescott Jail and Firehouse

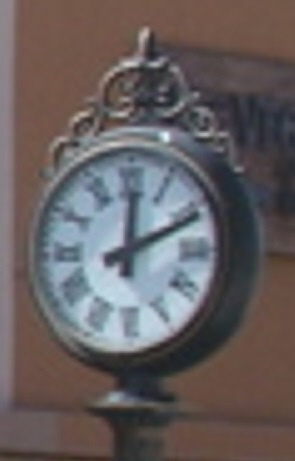
Olaf Helsa Clock
The Palace Hotel

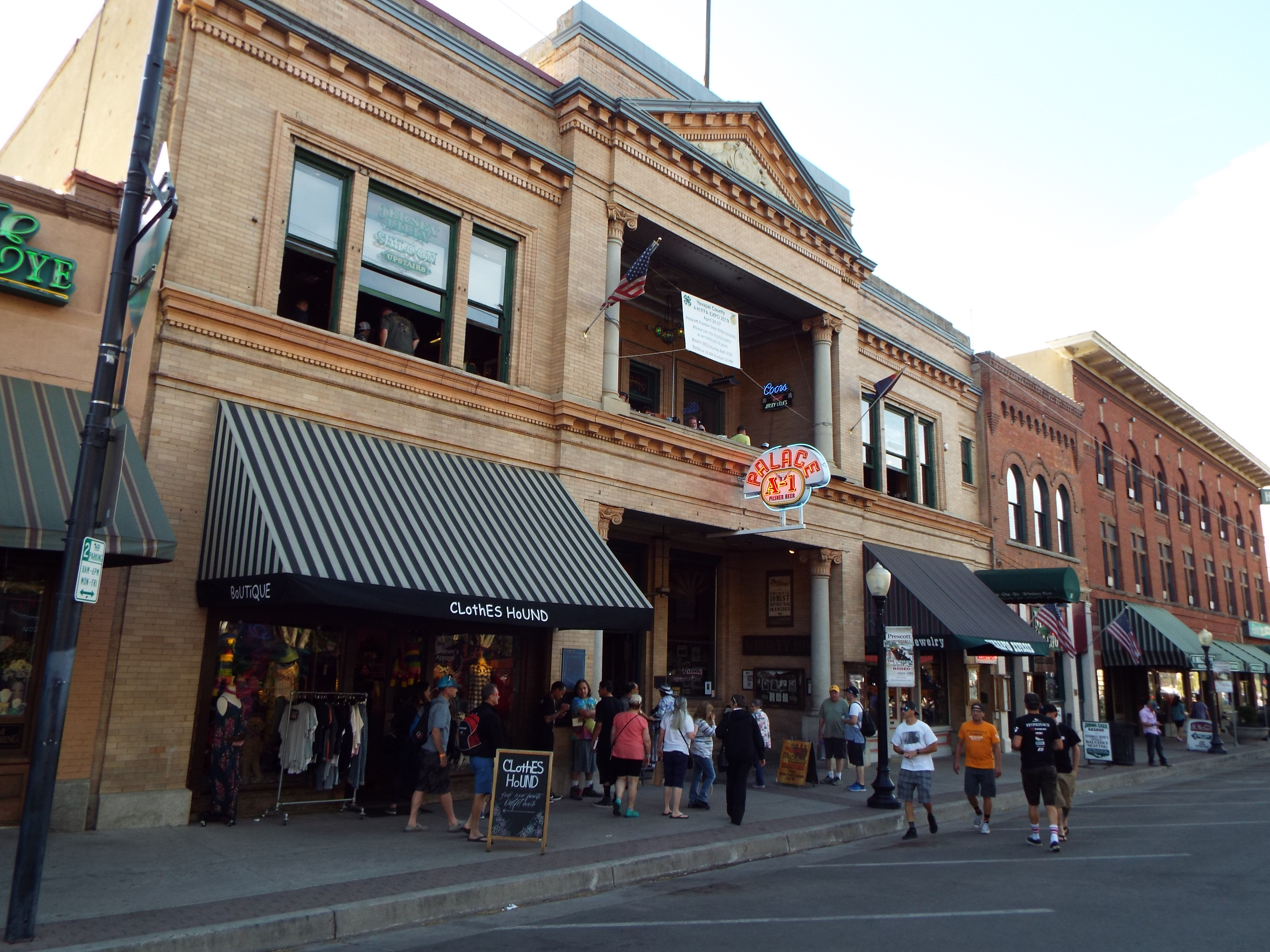
Palace Hotel

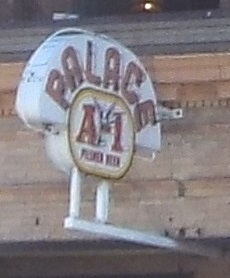
Palace Hotel outdoor sign

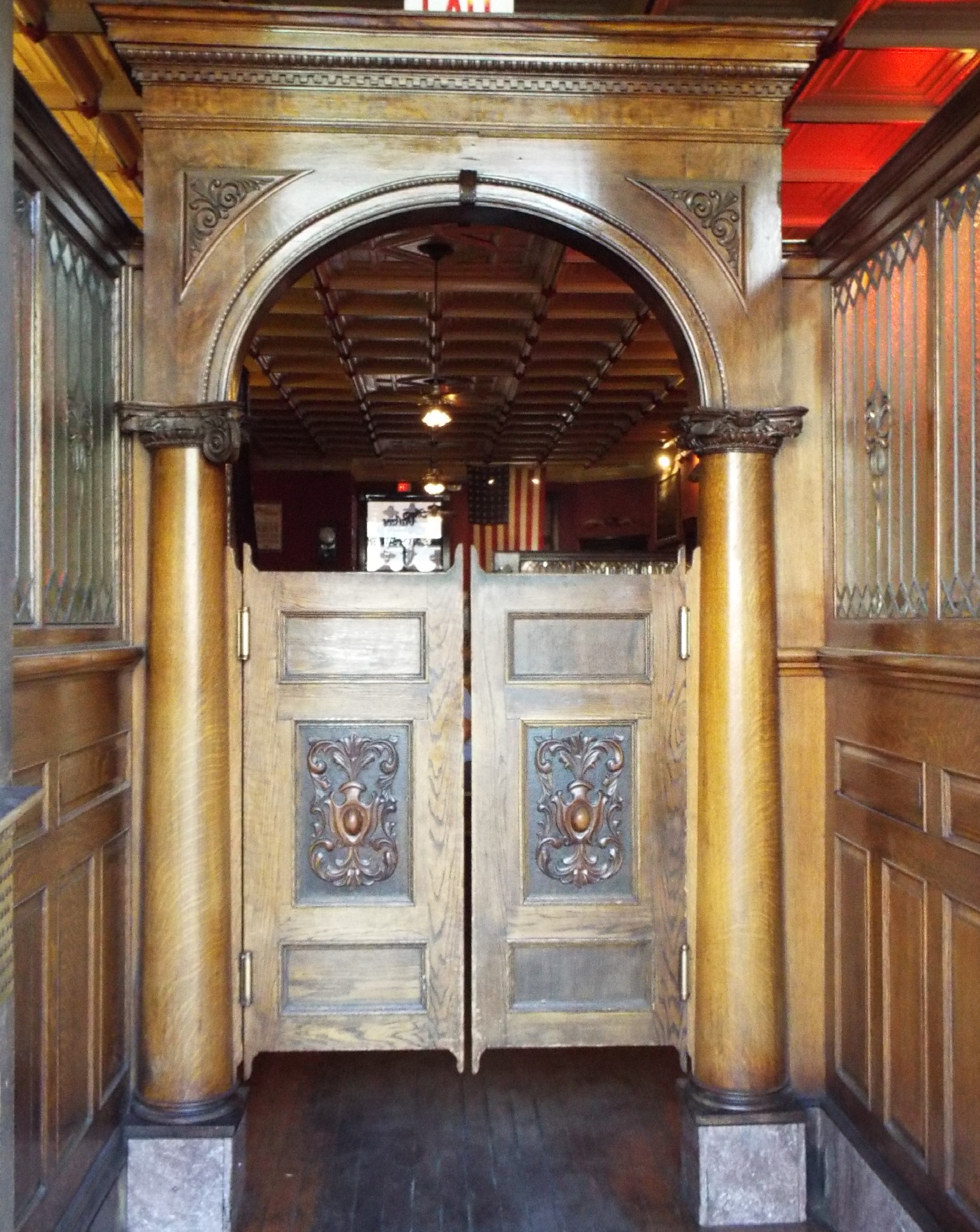
Original 1901 Saloon Swinging Doors

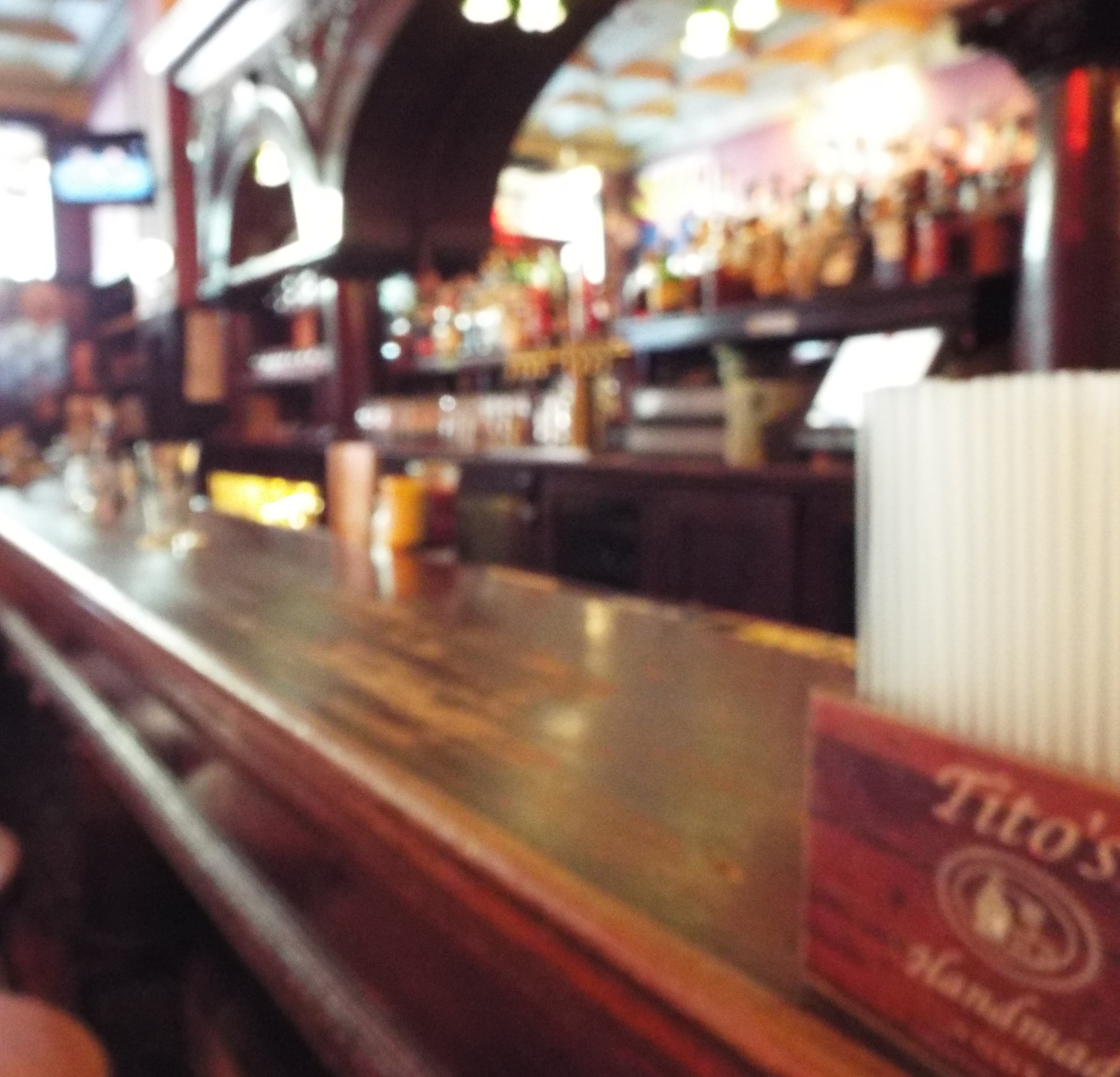
Original 1884 Brunswick bar

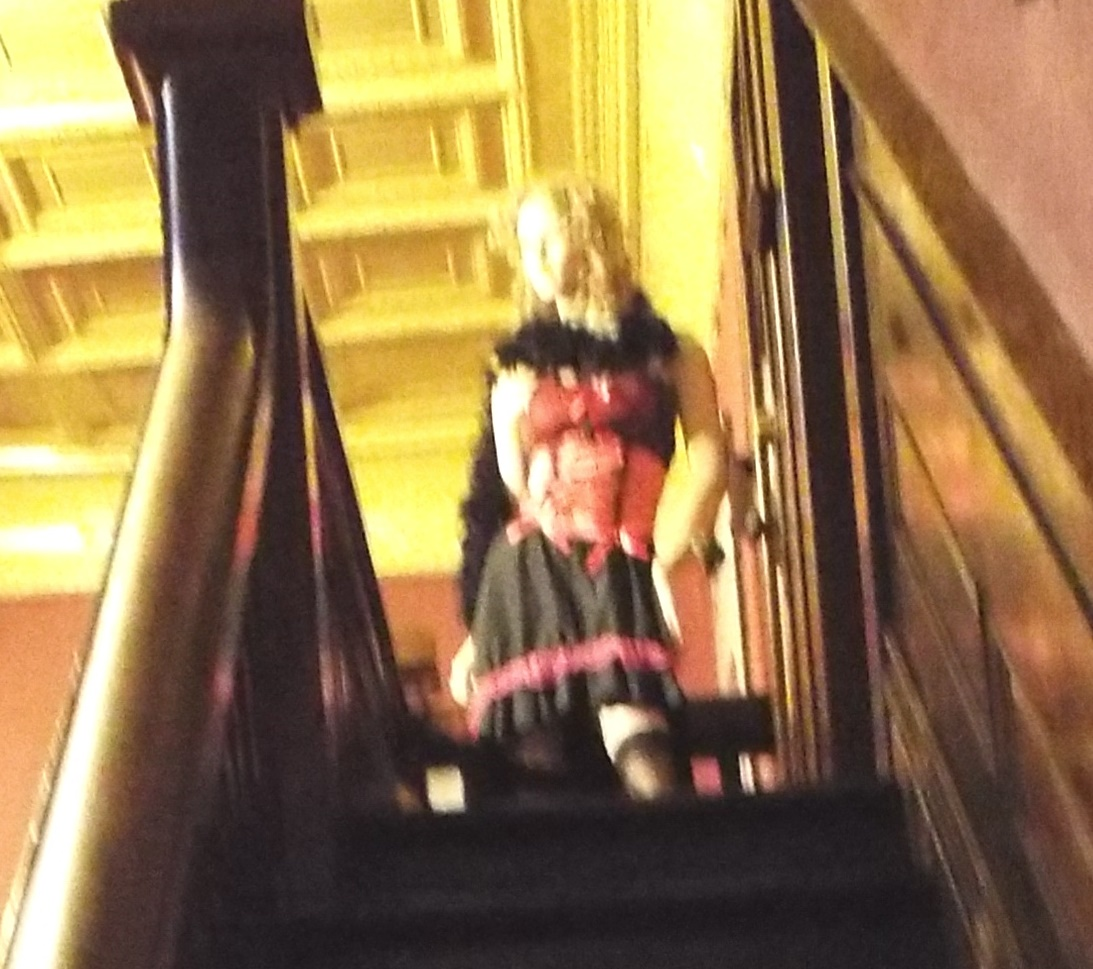
What once was the second floor Brothel room

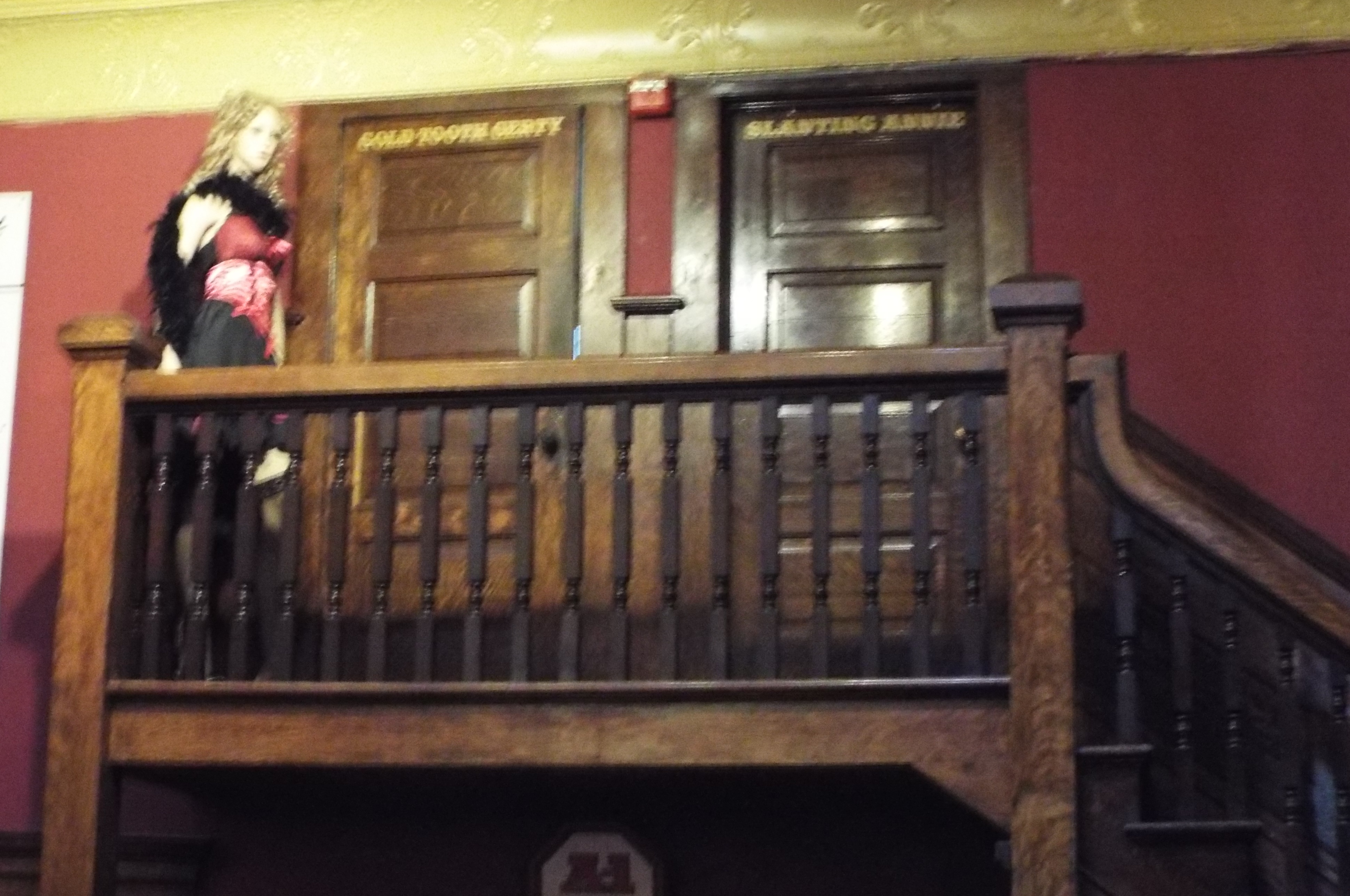
Different view of the second floor Brothel room

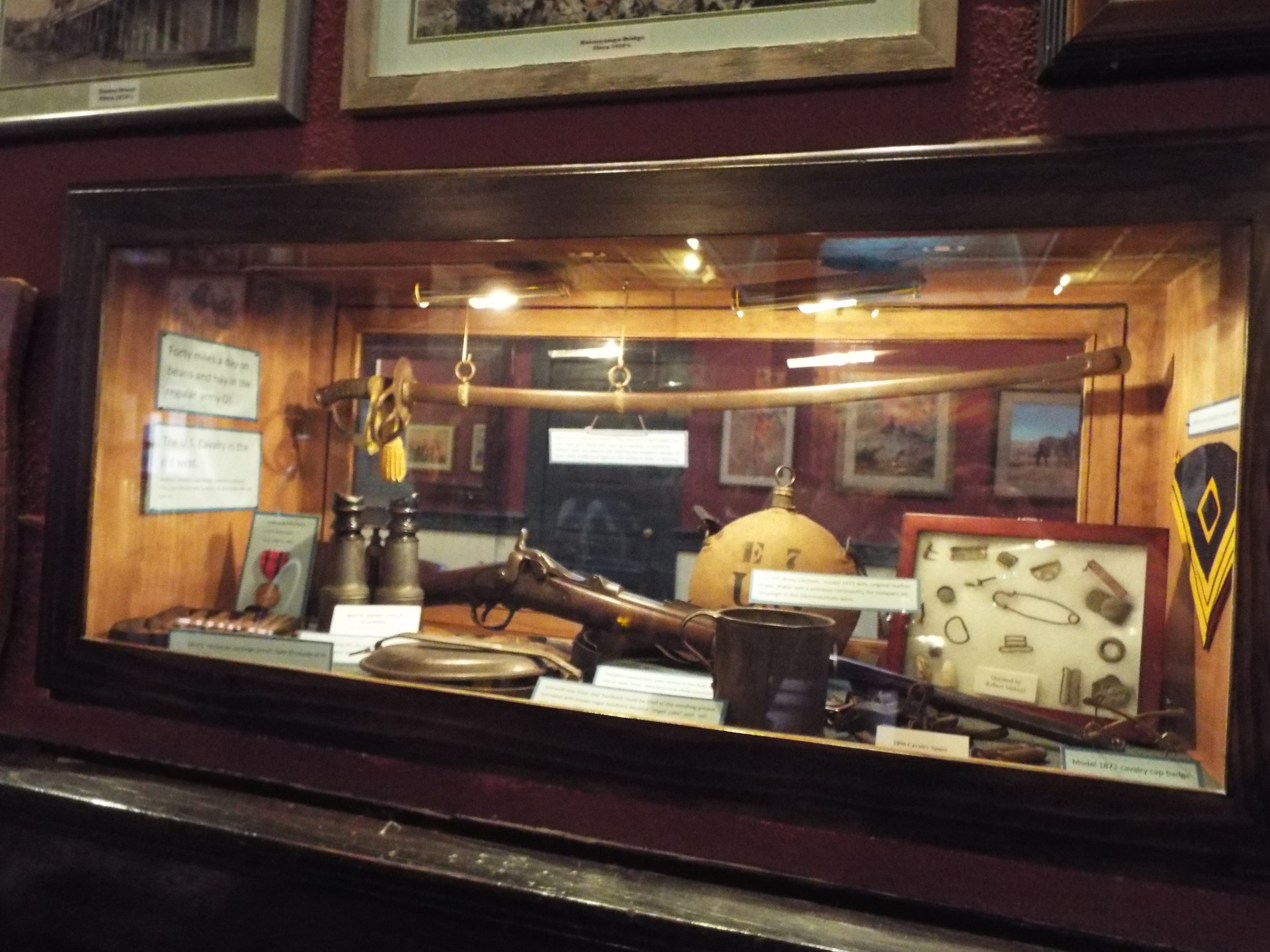
Fort Whipple display

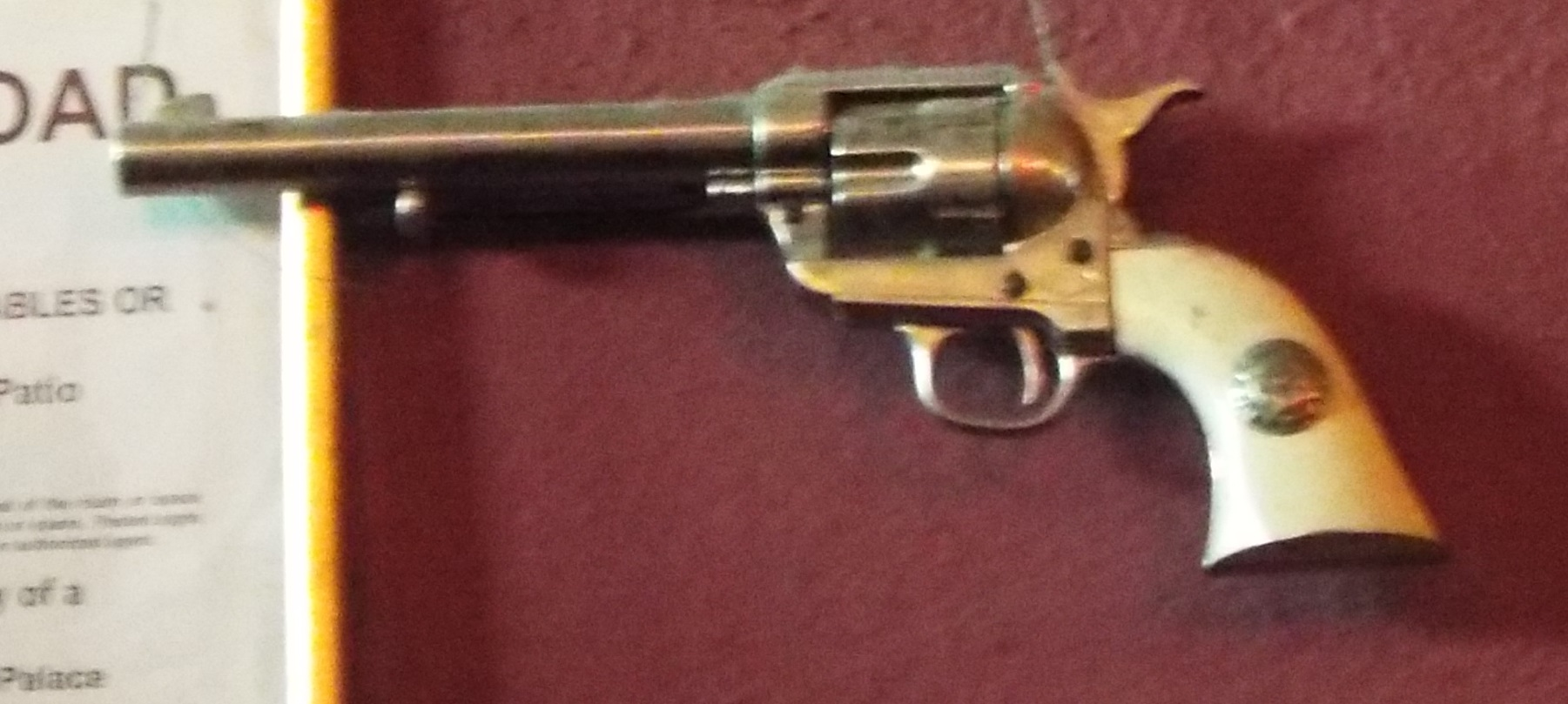
Replica of Wyatt Earp's Colt 45.

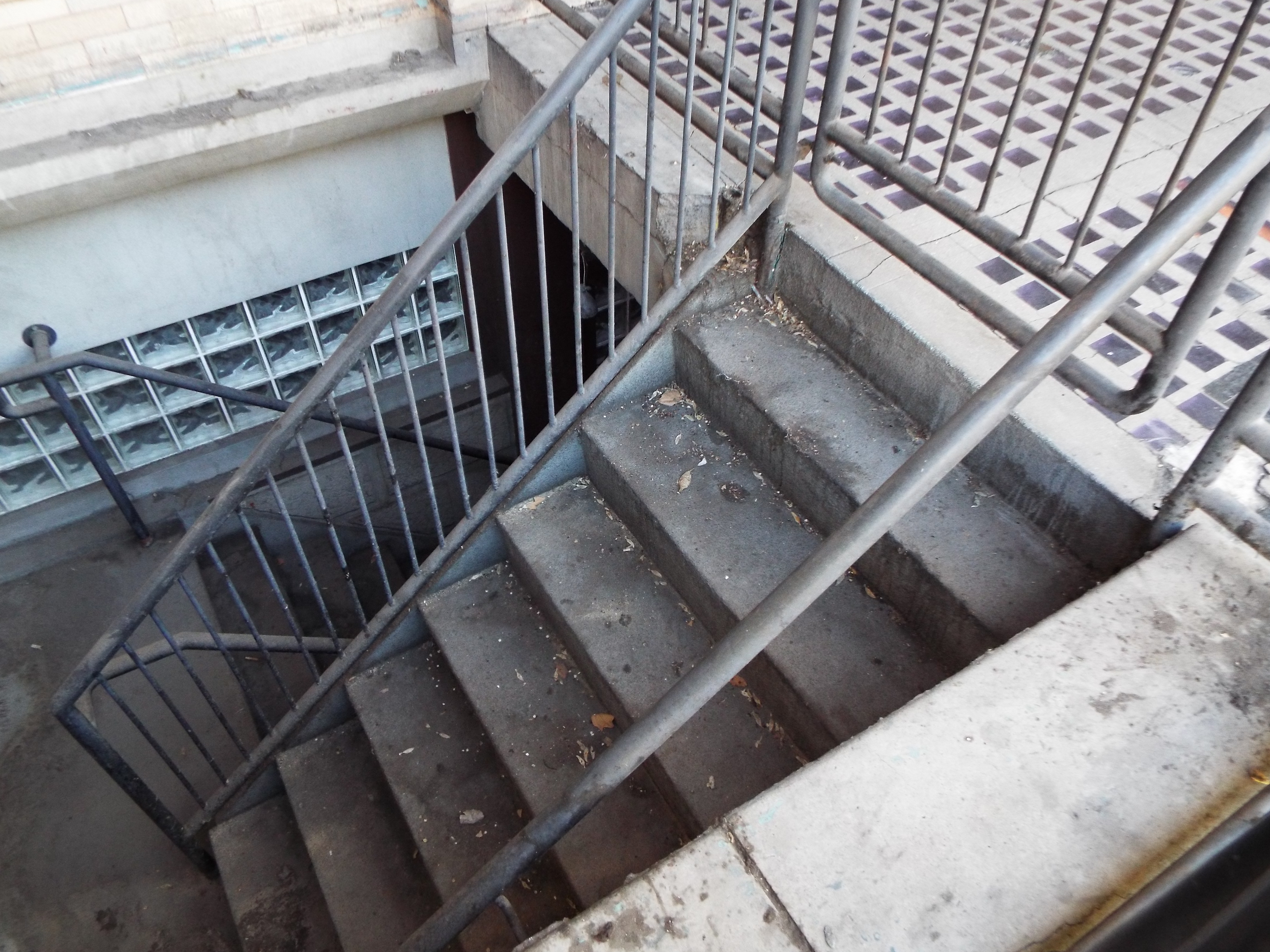
Downstairs to opium den

The original Prescott Opera House, which was built in the early 1870s in Prescott by James Howey, was moved to the Pioneer Living History Museum which is located at 3901 W. Pioneer Road in Phoenix, Arizona. In 1876, the Goldwater family established their first store there. Howey sold the building to Levi Bashford who in 1882, added a stage and converted the place into an opera house. John Drew, Jr. and Lillie Langtry performed in the opera house. The building ceased as an opera house in 1899.

The Prescott Opera House
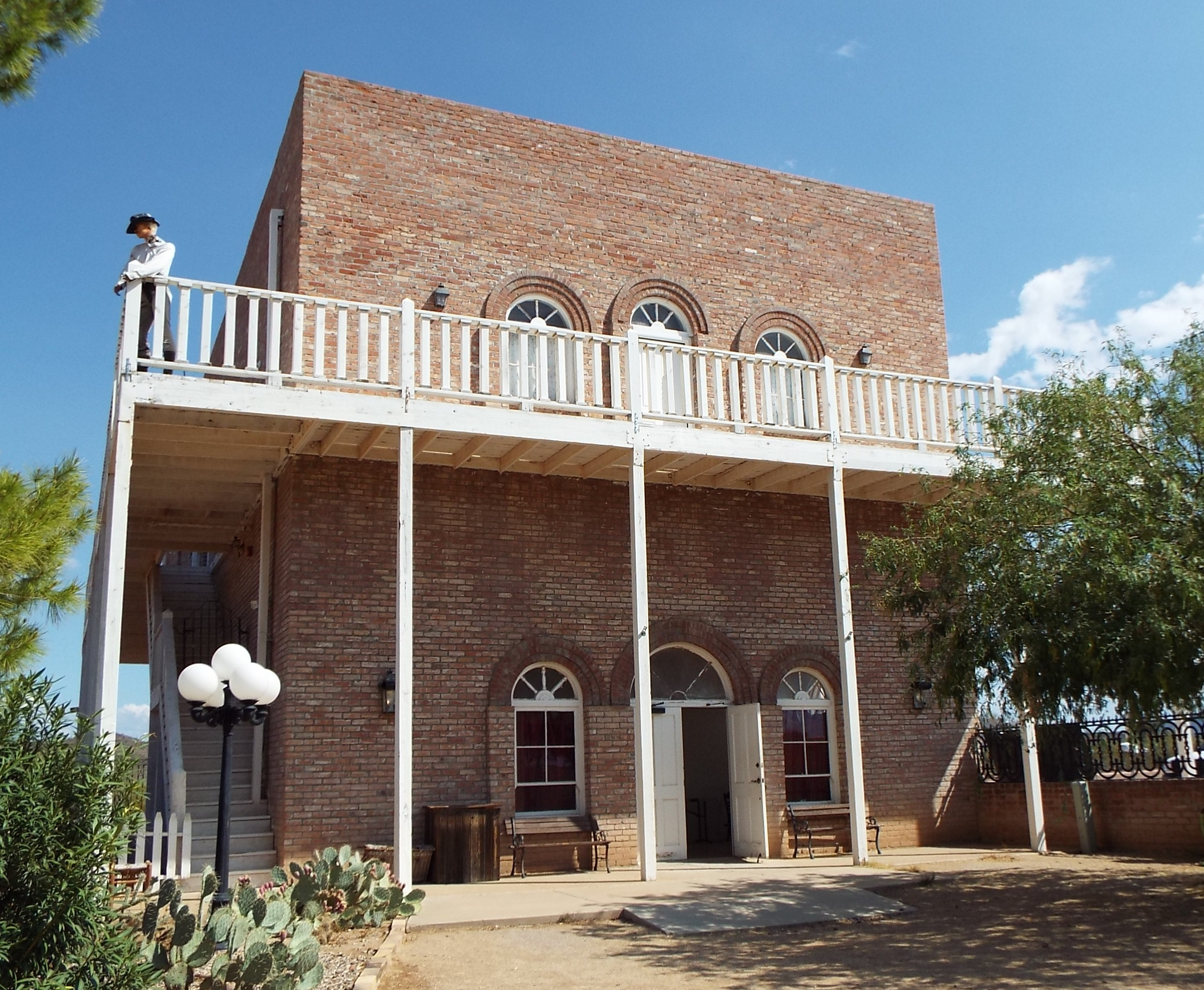
The Opera House.

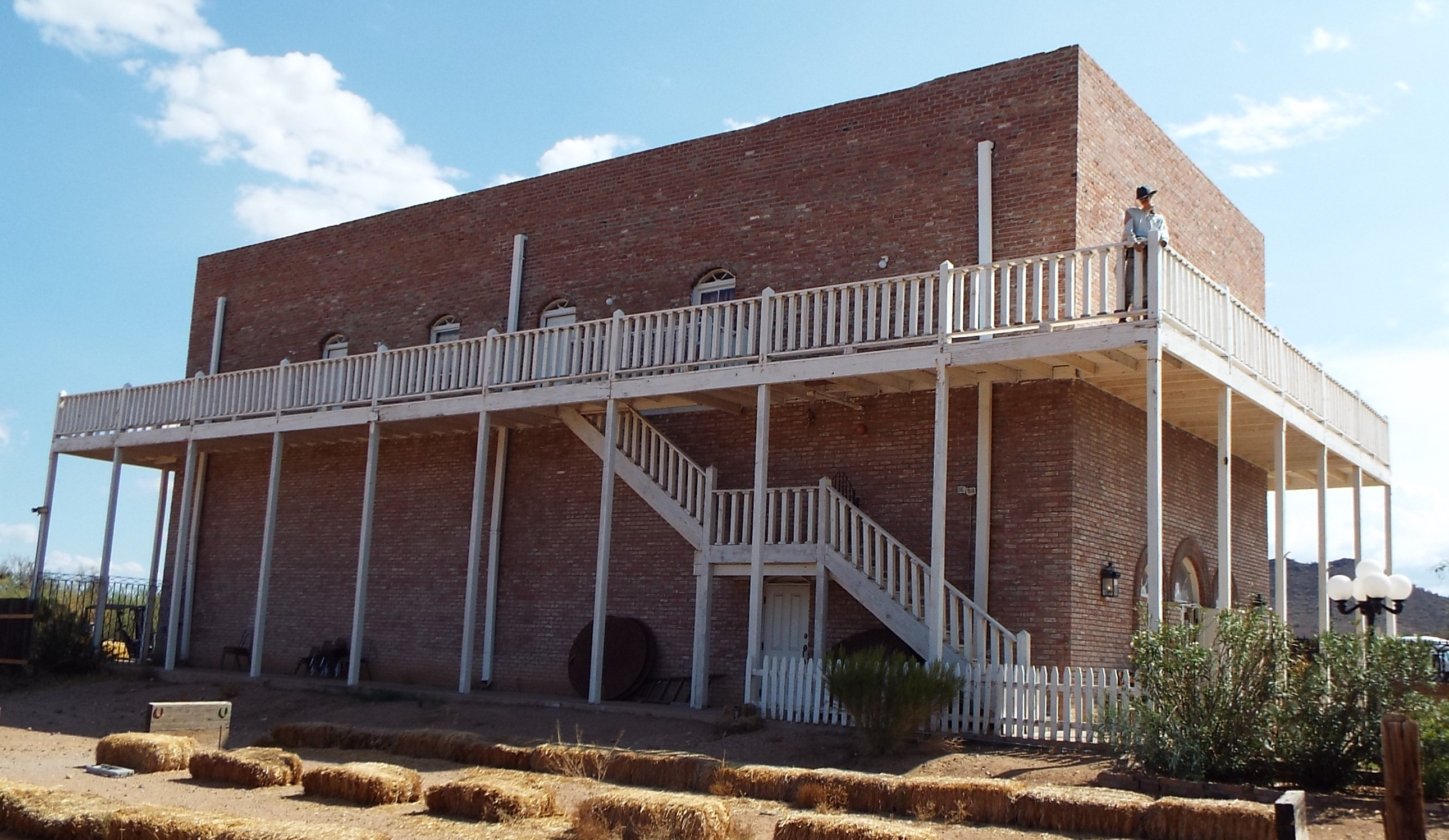
Different view of the 1899 Opera House.

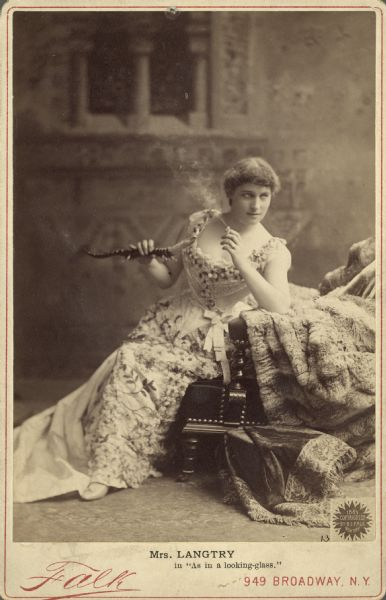
Lillie Langtry starring in the 1887 play As in a Looking-Glass in the Prescott Opera House.

=== Houses of religious worship ===
There are four historic houses of worship pictured. Of the four three are listed in the National Register of Historic Places while the remaining structure is eligible to be listed.

- 1st Congressional Church and Parsonage built in 1899 and located at 216–220 E. Gurley Street. Listed in the National register of Historic Places on December 14, 1978, reference #78003227. It is the oldest Congregational Church in Arizona and what is now the Southwest Conference.
- Mormon Church built in 1927 and located at 126 N. Marina St. Listed in the National register of Historic Places on December 22, 1983, reference #83003496. In 1982, the building was converted to commercial use.
- Sacred Heart Catholic Church and Rectory built in 1894 and located at 208 N. Marina Listed in the National register of Historic Places on December 14, 1978, reference #78003251. The building is used as the Prescott Fine Arts Association gallery.
- Solid Rock Christian Fellowship built in 1927 and located at 148 S. Marina Street.
Houses of religious worship
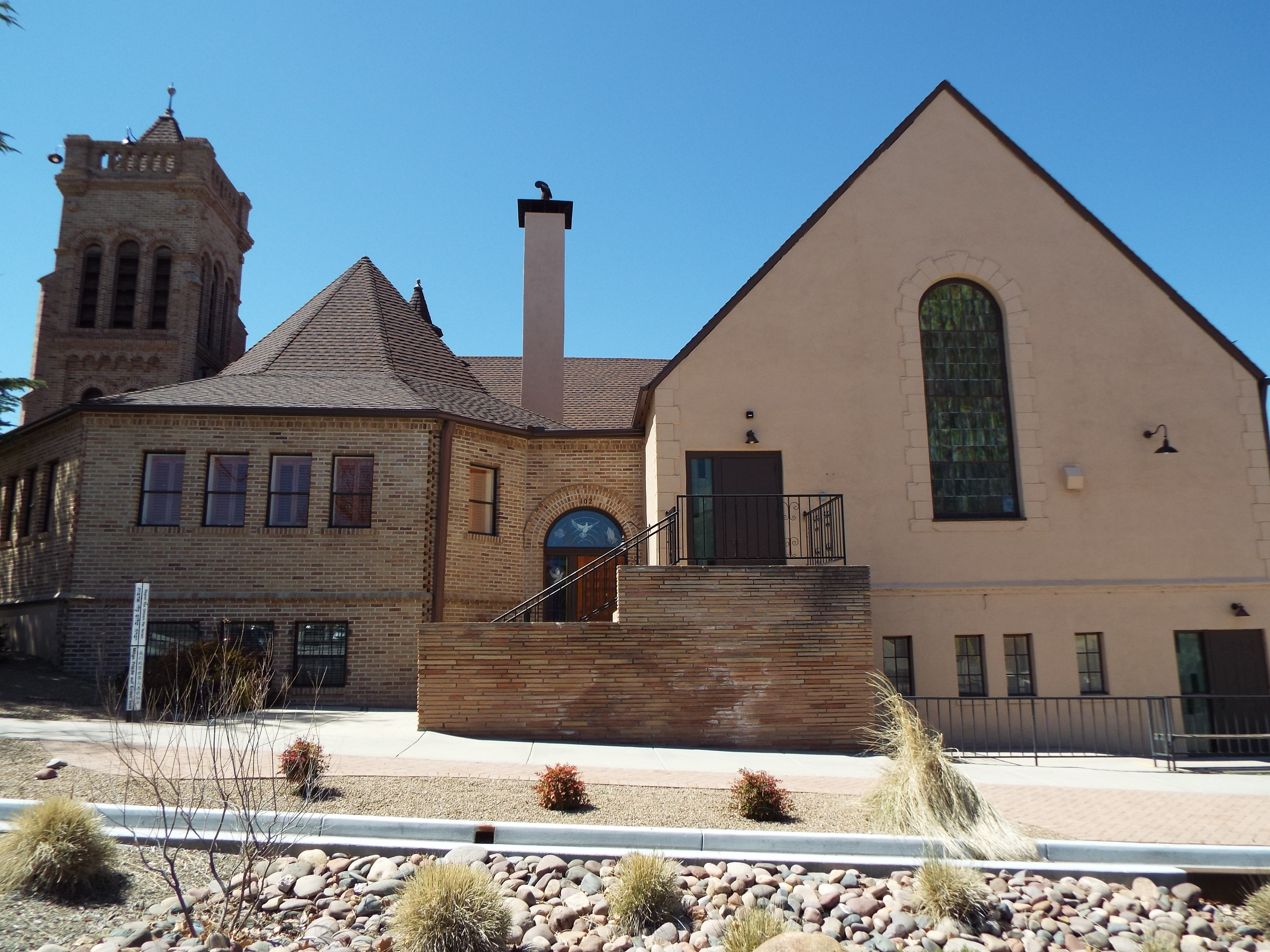
1st Congressional Church

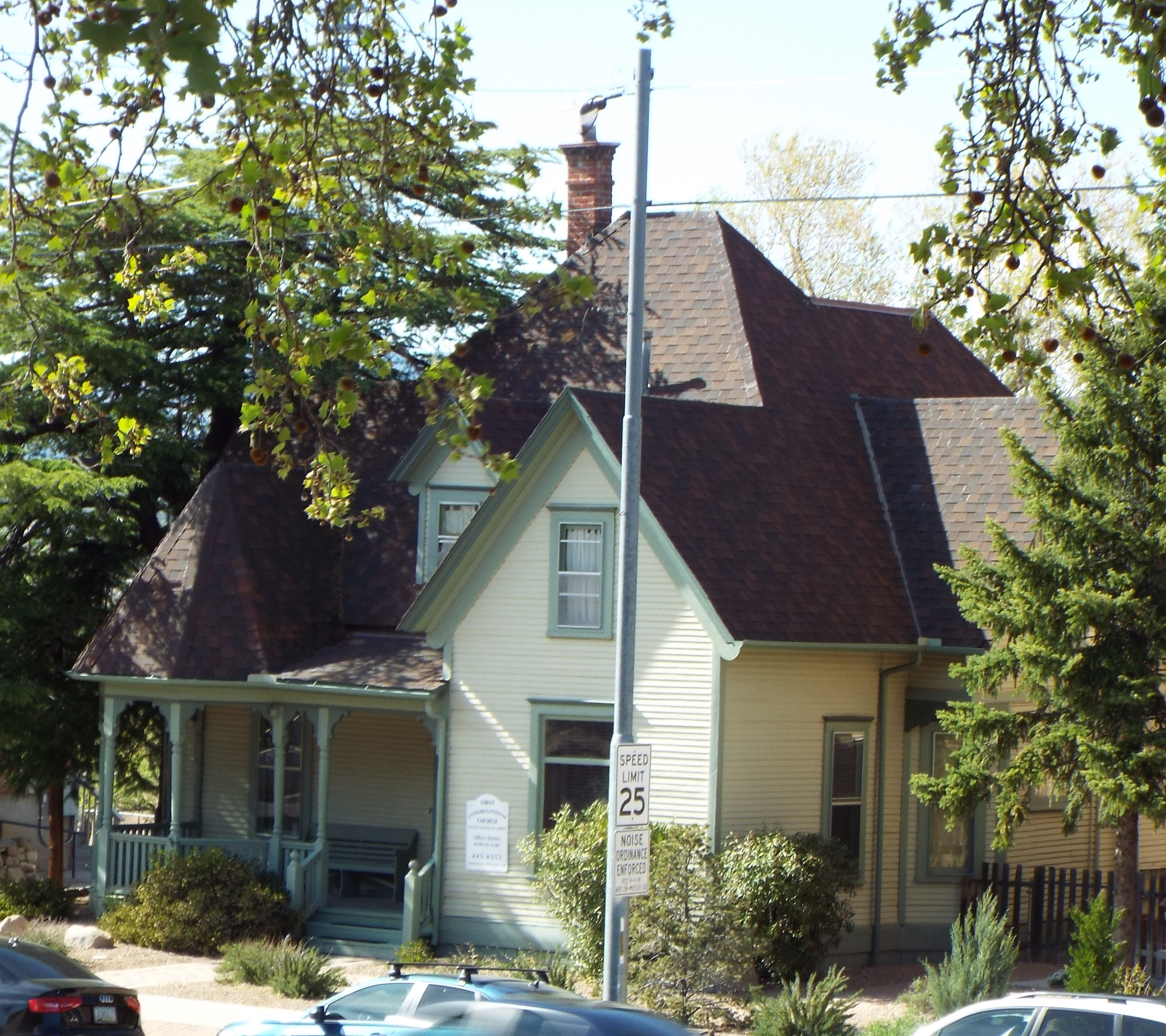
1st Congressional Church Parsonage

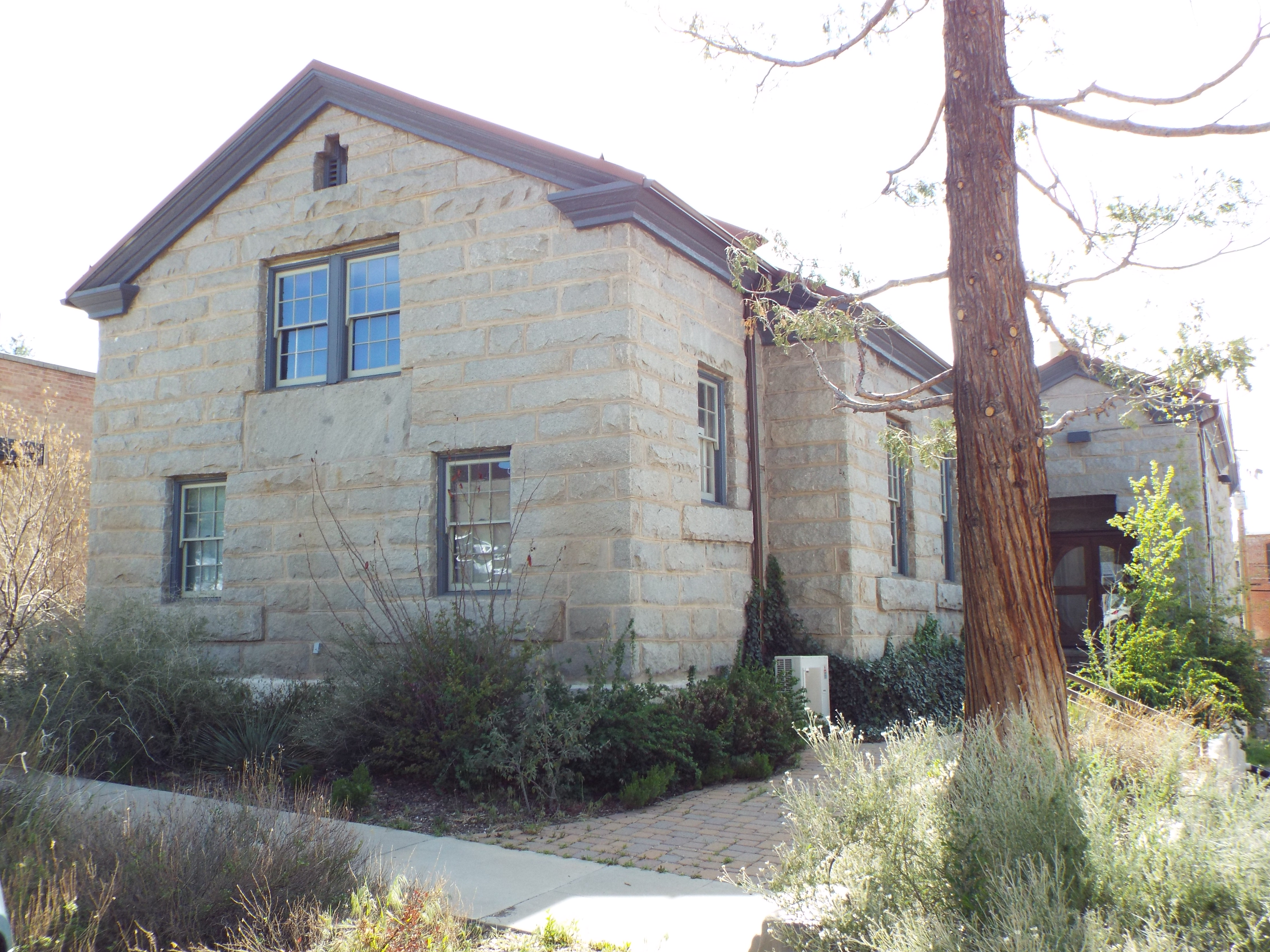
Mormon Church

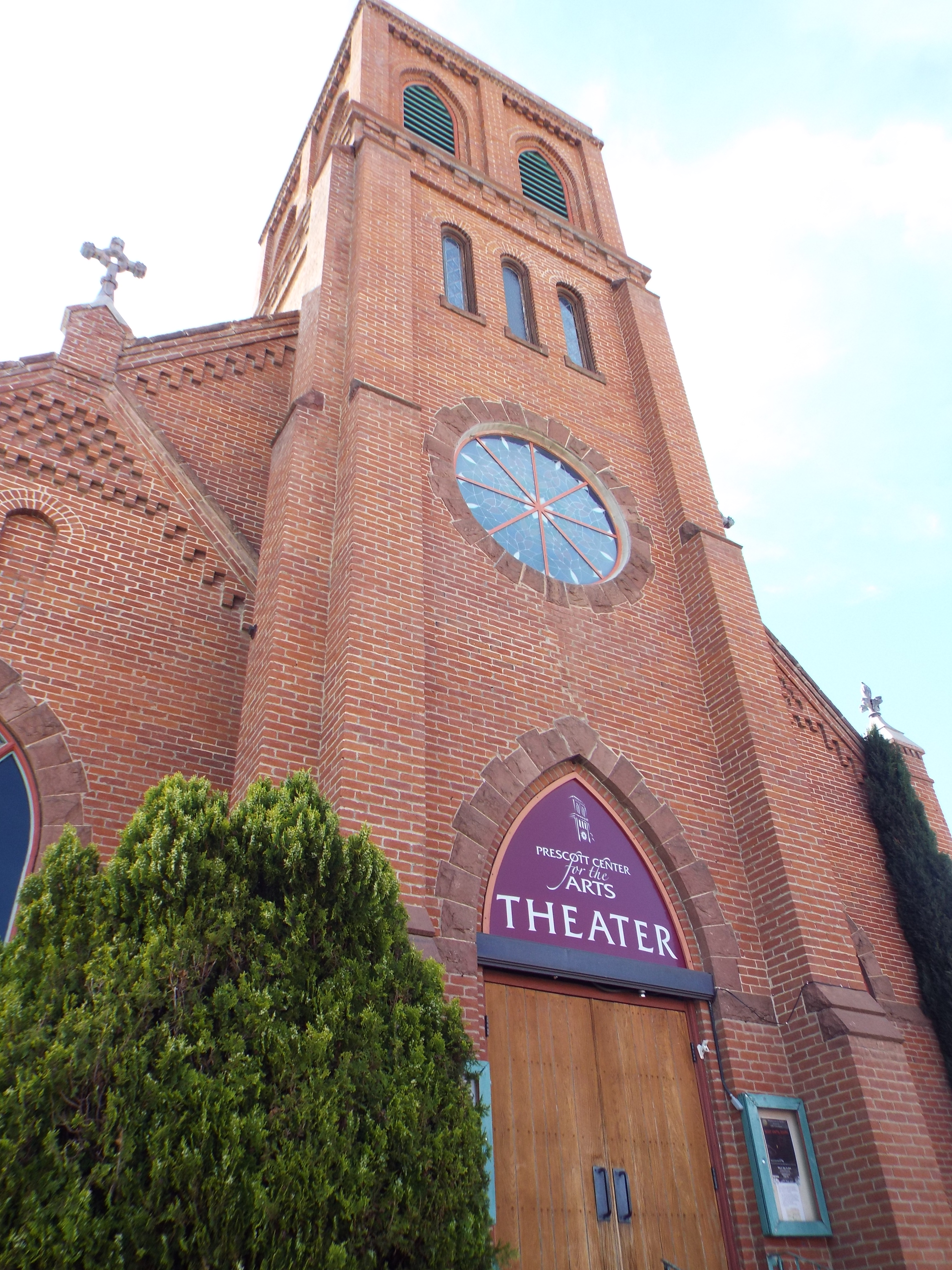
Sacred Heart Catholic Church

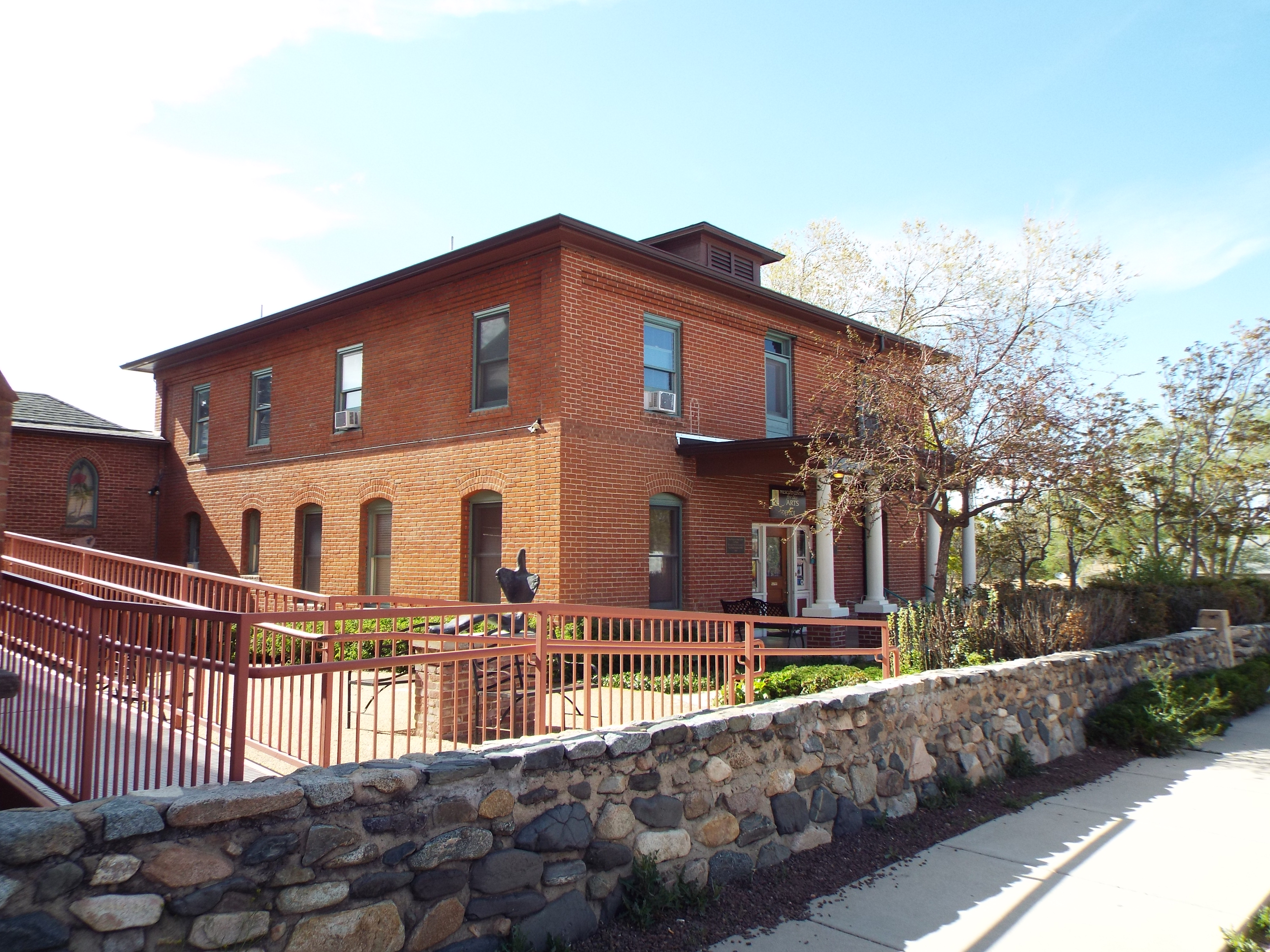
Sacred Heart Catholic Church Rectory

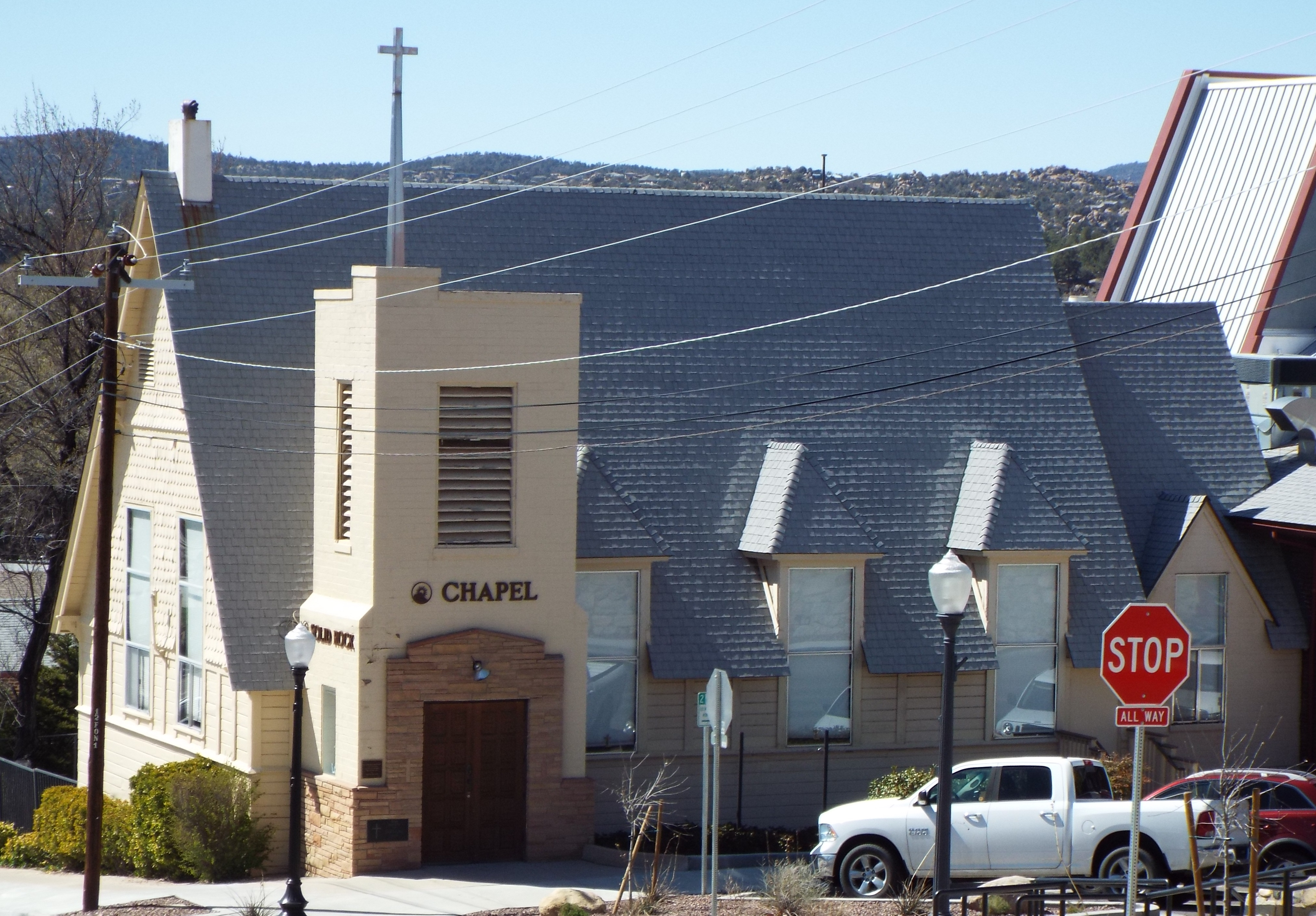
Solid Rock Christian Fellowship

=== Houses ===
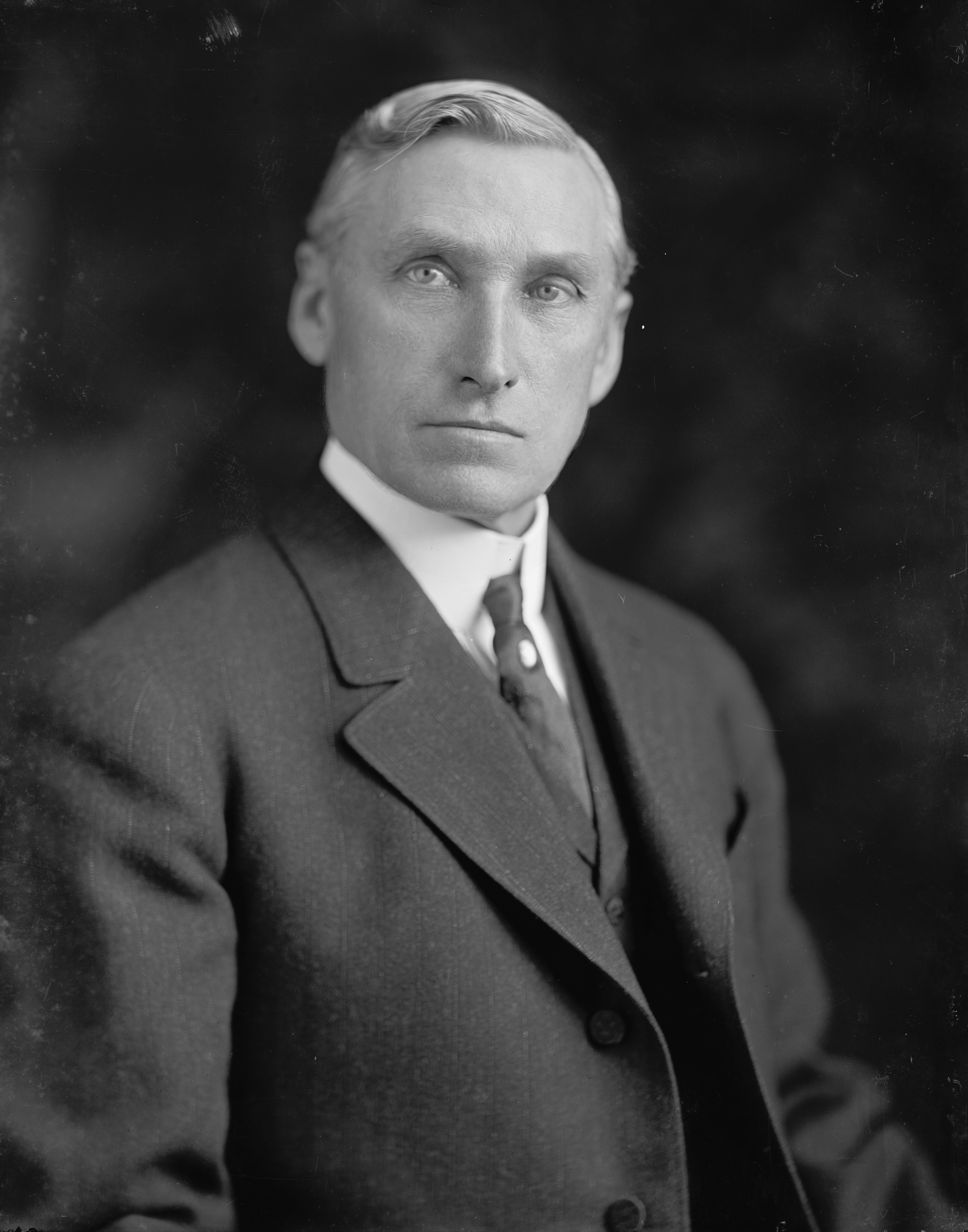
Governor Richard Elihu Sloan

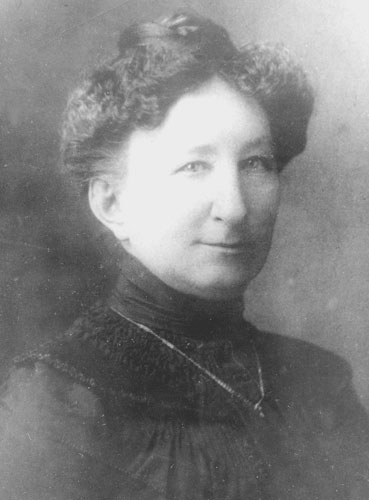
Big Nose Kate

- The Arizona Pioneers' Home – built in 1911 and located at 300 McCormick St. Listed in the National Register of Historic Places on November 20, 1995, reference #95001363. It is a retirement home in established to provide housing for early Arizona pioneers. Big Nose Kate was buried on November 6, 1940, under her birth name "Mary K. Cummings" (Mary Katherine Horony-Cummings) in the Arizona Pioneer Home Cemetery. She was the longtime companion and common-law wife of Old West gunfighter Doc Holliday.
- The A. W. Robinson Building – built in 1899 and located at 115 N. Grove St. Listed in the National Register of Historic Places on December 14, 1978, reference #78003250.
- The Blumberg House – built in 1900 and located at 143 N. Mt. Vernon St. Listed in the National Register of Historic Places on December 14, 1978, reference #78003217
- The Brinkmeyer House – built in 1899 and located at 605 W. Gurley St. Listed in the National Register of Historic Places on December 14, 1978, reference #78003218
- The Burmister/Timerhoff House – built in 1899 and located at 116 S. Mt. Vernon St. Listed in the National Register of Historic Places on December 14, 1978, reference #78003219. Robert B. Burmister was the son of pioneer Prescott merchant Robert H. Burmister. His mother, Margaret, was the daughter of Territorial Governor, Coles Bashford. In 1909 the property was acquired by H. Timerhoff, a local drug store owner and politician. Timerhoff and his family lived in the house during his several terms as mayor.
- The Clark House – built in 1883 and located at 109 N. Pleasant St. Listed in the National Register of Historic Places on December 14, 1978, reference #78003220. Eli Payson Clark was a saw-miller, secretary-treasurer of the Prescott and Arizona Central Railroad Company, later the Santa Fe, Prescott and Phoenix Railroad with Frank Murphy. He served as Territorial Auditor while in Prescott.
- The Curtis Cottage – built in 1881, and located at 125 S. McCormick St. Listed in the National Register of Historic Places on May 4, 1993, reference #93000344.
- The Day House – built in 1887 and located at 212 E. Gurley St. Listed in the National Register of Historic Places on December 14, 1978, reference #78003222
- The Detwiler House – built in 1900 and located at 310 N. Alarcon St. Listed in the National Register of Historic Places on December 14, 1978, reference #78003223
- The Drake House – built in 1901 and located at 137 N. Mt. Vernon St. Listed in the National Register of Historic Places on December 14, 1978, reference #78003224
- The Charles H. Dunning Log Cabin – built in 1932 and located at 811 Boulder Dr. Listed in the National Register of Historic Places on August 26, 1993, reference #93000870
- The Fisher/Goldwater House – built in 1894 and located at 240 S. Cortez St. Listed in the National Register of Historic Places on December 14, 1978, reference #78003228. Mayor Morris Goldwater boarded at the home of Mr. and Mrs. Fisher at 240 S. Cortez Street. Mr. Fisher died in 1895, and, on September 19, 1906, Sara (Sally) Ann Shivers Fisher married Morris Goldwater.
- The Fredericks House – built in and located at 202 S. Pleasant St. Listed in the National Register of Historic Places as reference #78003229. R.N. Fredericks served as president of the Prescott National Bank and had extensive personal investments.
- The Gage/Murphy House – built in 1875 and located at 105 S. Alarcon St. Listed in the National Register of Historic Places on December 14, 1978, reference #78003230
- The Goldwater-Henry House – built in 1894 and located at 217 Union St. Listed in the National Register of Historic Places on March 25, 1982, reference #82002091. Henry was the uncle of U.S. Senator Barry Goldwater.
- The Lawler-Hetherington Double House – built in 1894 and located at 223 E. Union St. Listed in the National Register of Historic Places on December 14, 1978, reference #78003237
- The Hawkins House – built in 1895 and located at 122 S. Mt. Vernon St. Listed in the National Register of Historic Places on December 14, 1978, reference #78003232. John J. Hawkins was a prominent attorney and judge during the last three decades of Arizona's territorial period.
- The Hazeltine House – built in 1903, and located at 202 S. Mt. Vernon St. Listed in the National Register of Historic Places on December 14, 1978, reference #78003233. Moses Hazeltine Sherman was a teacher, who was invited by the third Governor of Arizona Territory, Gov. Anson P. K. Safford in 1873 to organize the Territory's schools. In Prescott he built the Prescott Free Academy, the first graded school in the Territory and the second school building in Prescott; across Alarcon Street in front of what is now the Washington School. He was then appointed by Gov. John C. Frémont to the position of Superintendent of Public Instruction and later elected to that post in 1880. He and his brother-in-law Eli P. Clark then went into the business of Electric railroads and developing lands.
- The Head House – built in 1875 and located at 309 E. Gurley St. Listed in the National Register of Historic Places on December 14, 1978, reference #78003234
- The Hill House – built in 1906 and located at 144 S. Park St. Listed in the National Register of Historic Places on December 14, 1978, reference #78003235. Amy Hill, who owned the house was the widow of Sam Hill who at the time of his death in 1901, was the owner of the oldest and largest Mercantile Company in Prescott.
- The Kenwill Apartments – built in 1925 and located at 119–127 E. Goodwin St. Listed in the National Register of Historic Places on January 21, 1988, reference #87002494
- The Marks House – built in 1875 and located at 203 E. Union St. Listed in the National Register of Historic Places on December 14, 1978, reference #78003239
- The Martin/Ling House – built in 1892 and located at 125 N. Pleasant St. Listed in the National Register of Historic Places on December 14, 1978, reference #78003240
- The Morin House – built in 1899 134 and located at N. Mt. Vernon St. Listed in the National Register of Historic Places on December 14, 1978, reference #78003242
- The Morrison House – built in 1902 and located at 300 S. Marina St. Listed in the National Register of Historic Places on December 14, 1978, reference #78003243
- The Otis House – built in 1877 113 and located at N. Pleasant St. Listed in the National Register of Historic Places on December 14, 1978, reference #78003245. Theodore Weld Otis was a graduate of Oberlin College. He was an Army veteran and later became a School teacher. He came with his family to Prescott in 1874 from New York and established a grocery. Otis served his community as Judge, Coroner, and Postmaster and in 1895 he and a Rev. McLean began a school for the Chinese men in Prescott.
- The Peters House – built in 1898 211 and located at E. Union St. Listed in the National Register of Historic Places on December 14, 1978, reference #78003247
- The Roberts House – built in 1880 and located at 136 N. Pleasant St. Listed in the National Register of Historic Places on December 14, 1978, reference #78003249
- The Sewall House – built in 1893 220 and located at N. Mt. Vernon St. Listed in the National Register of Historic Places on December 14, 1978, reference #78003253
- The Shekels House – built in 1872 and located at 226 S. Cortez St. Listed in the National Register of Historic Places on December 14, 1978, reference #78003254
- The Sloan House – built in 1900 and located at 128 N. Mt. Vernon St. Listed in the National Register of Historic Places on December 14, 1978, reference #78003255. This house belonged to Richard Elihu Sloan, prominent attorney whose extensive public service was climaxed with his appointment as the last territorial governor.
- The Wells House – built in 1878 and located at 303 S. Cortez St. Listed in the National Register of Historic Places on December 14, 1978, reference #78003257
- The Wilder House – built in 1891 and located at 346 S. Montezuma St. Listed in the National Register of Historic Places on December 14, 1978, reference #78003259
Historic houses

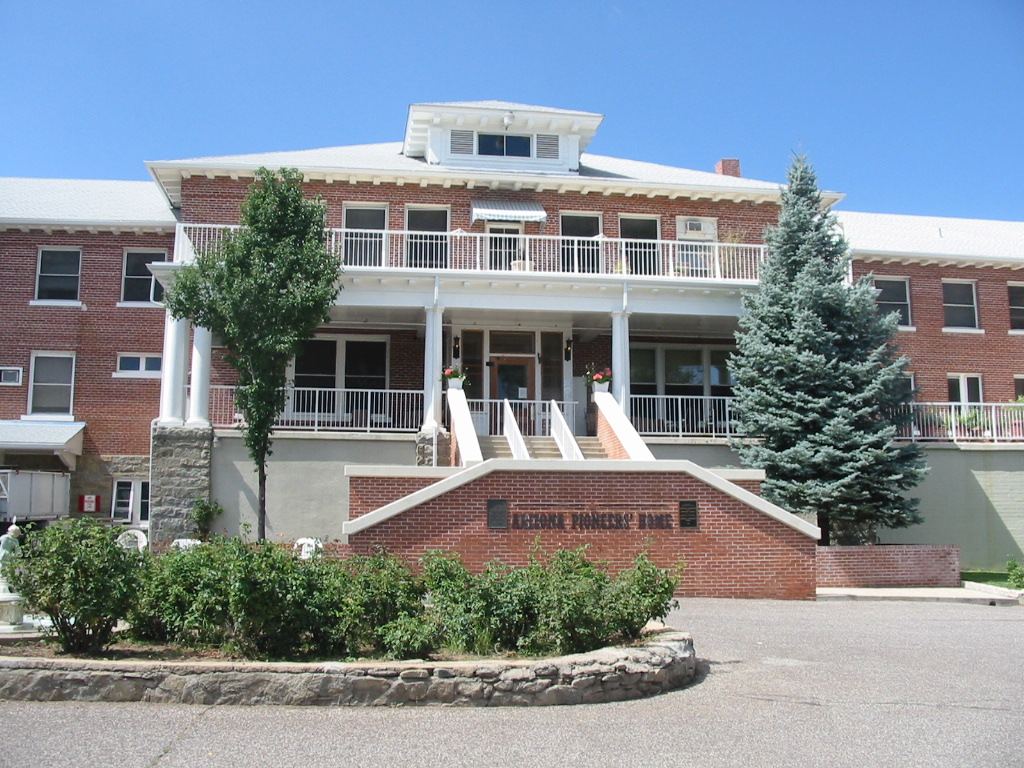
Arizona Pioneers' Home

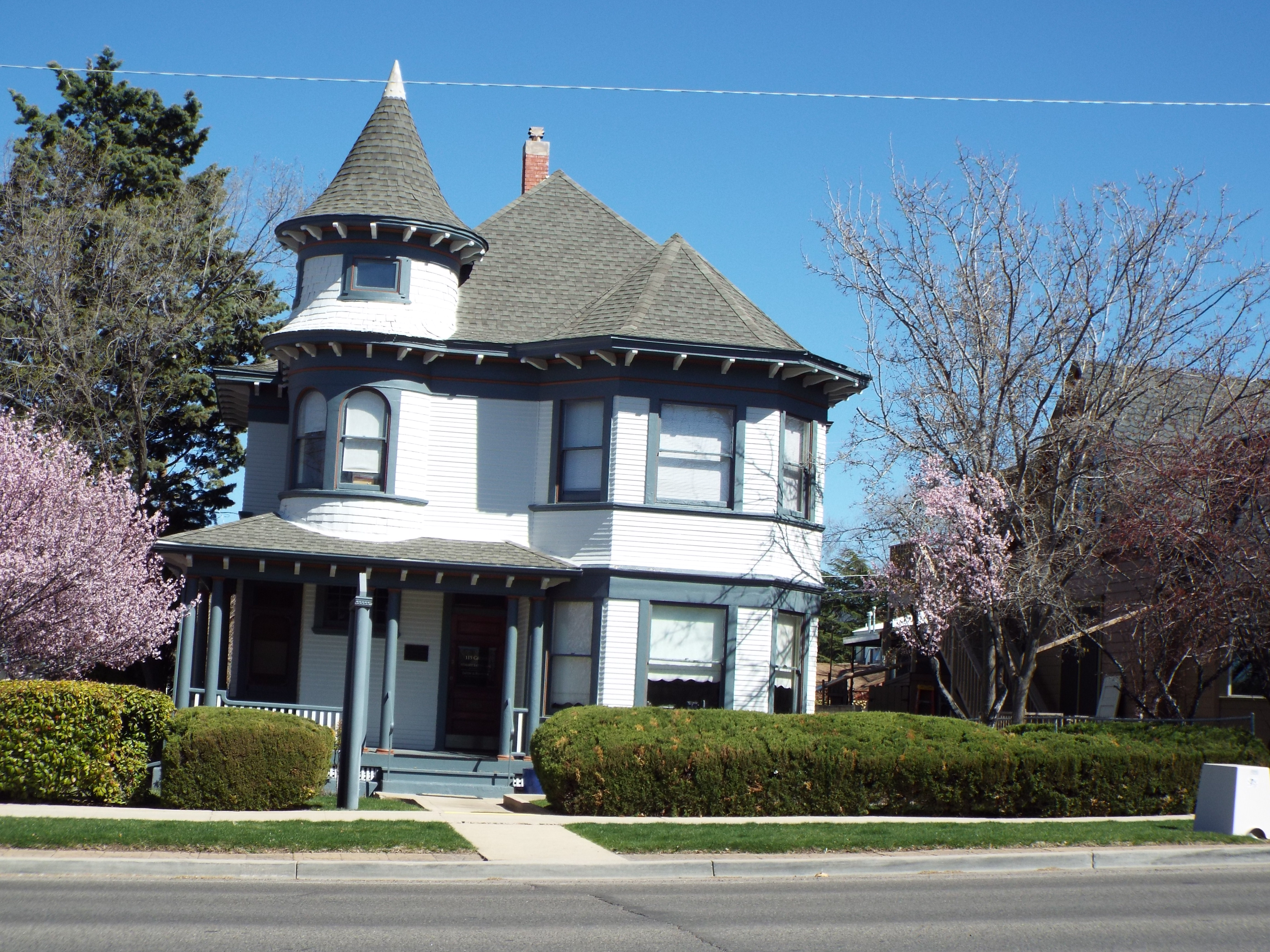
A. W. Robinson Building

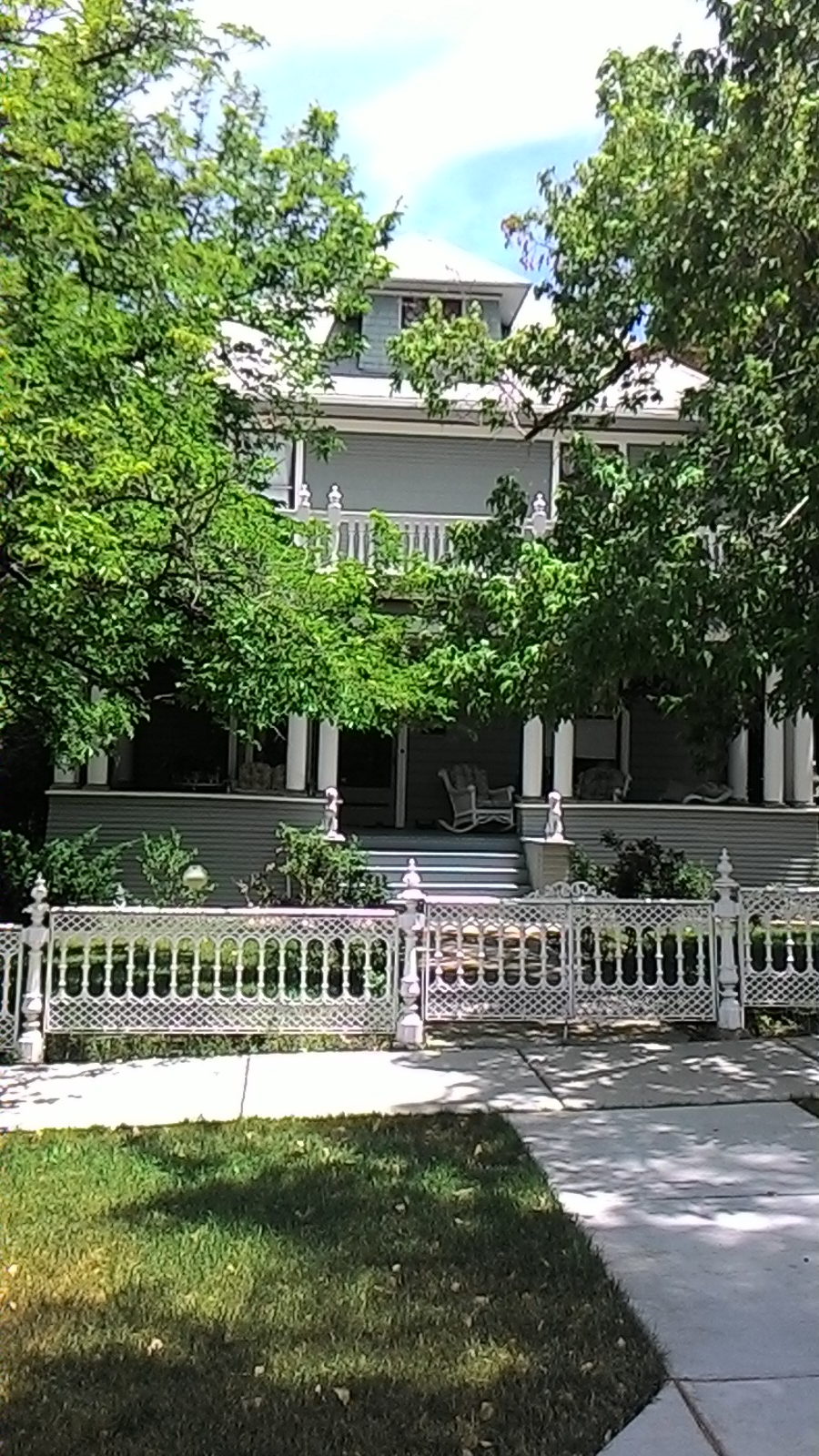
Blumberg House

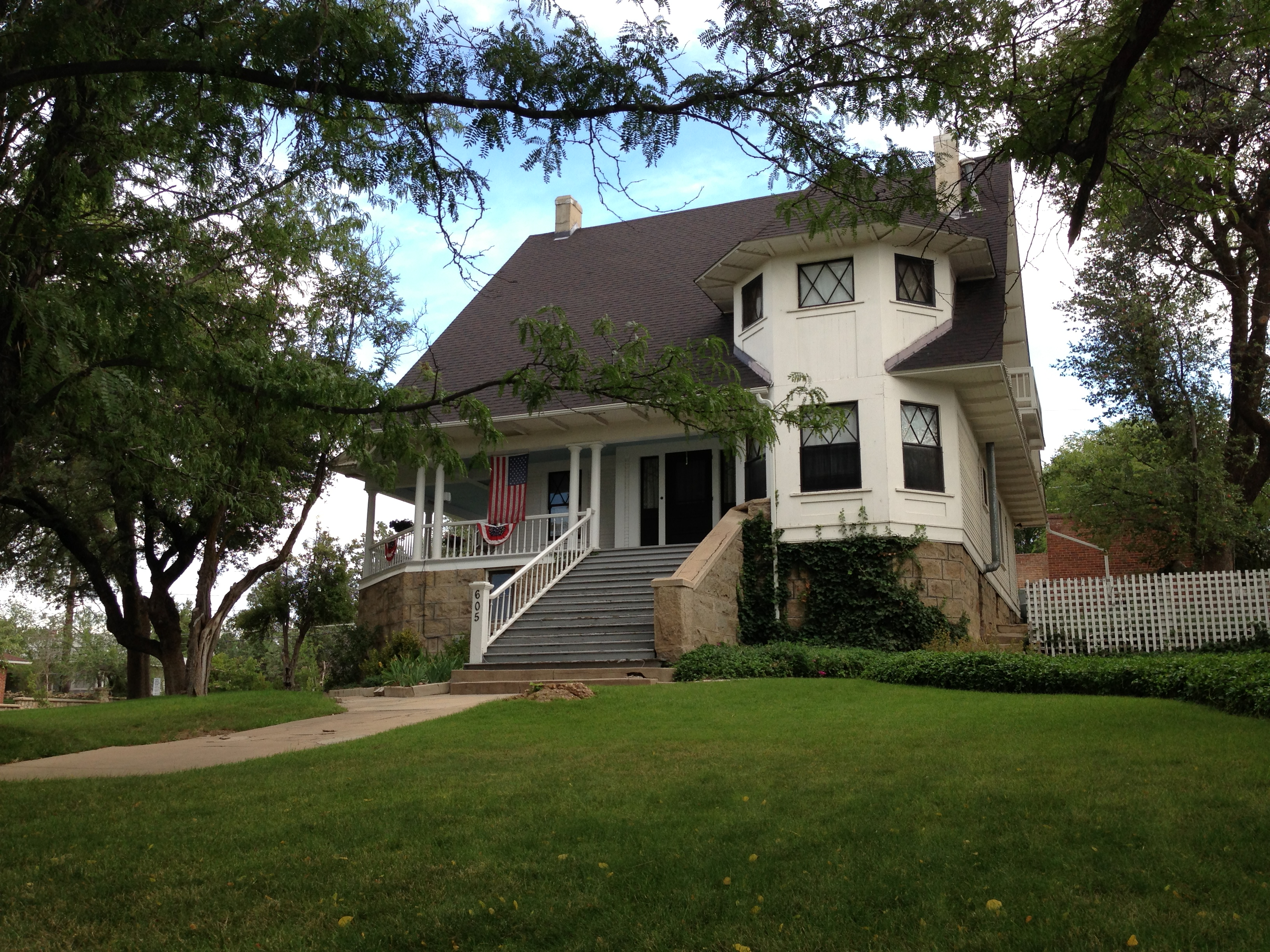
Brinkmeyer House

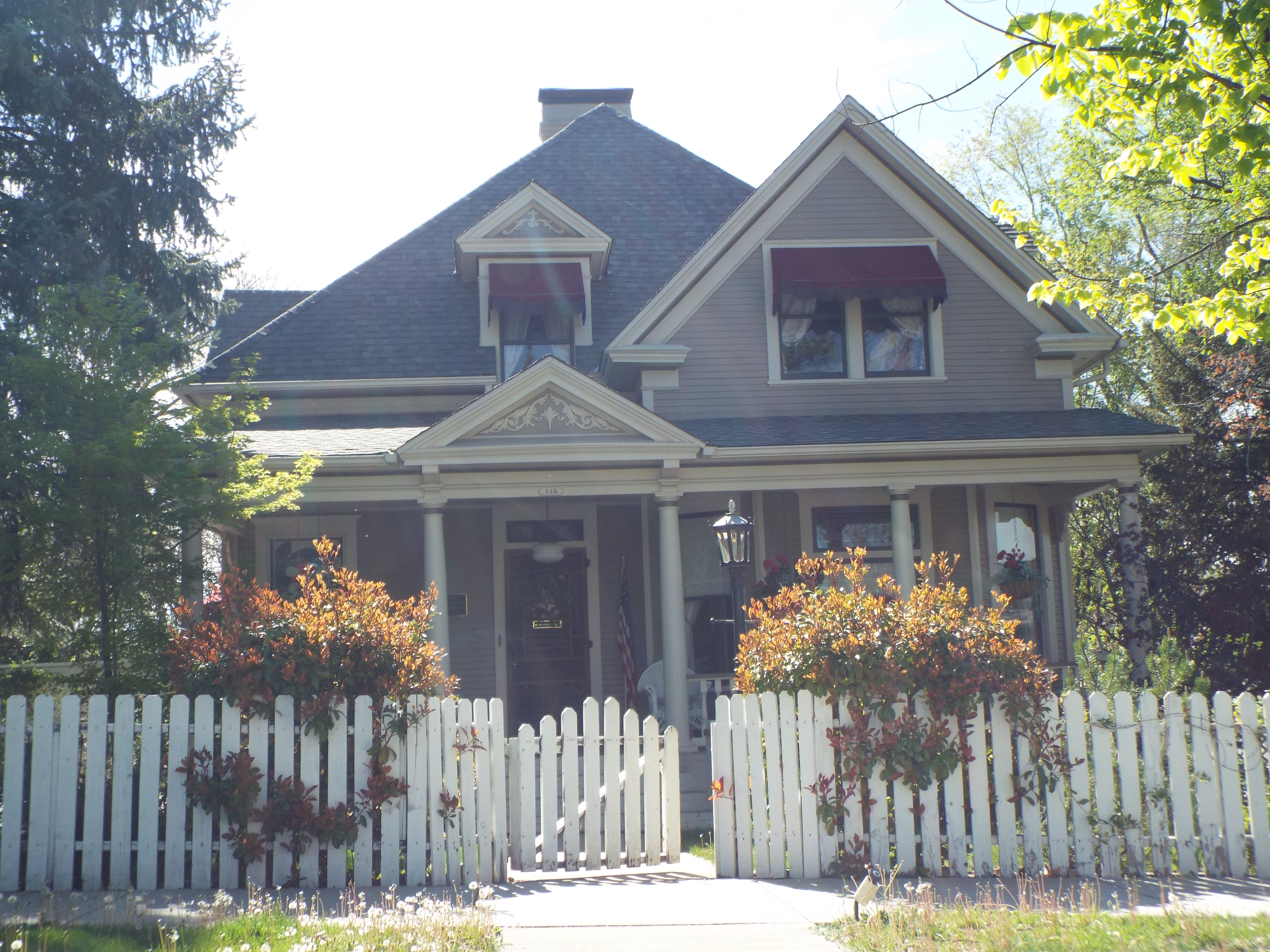
Burmister/Timerhoff House

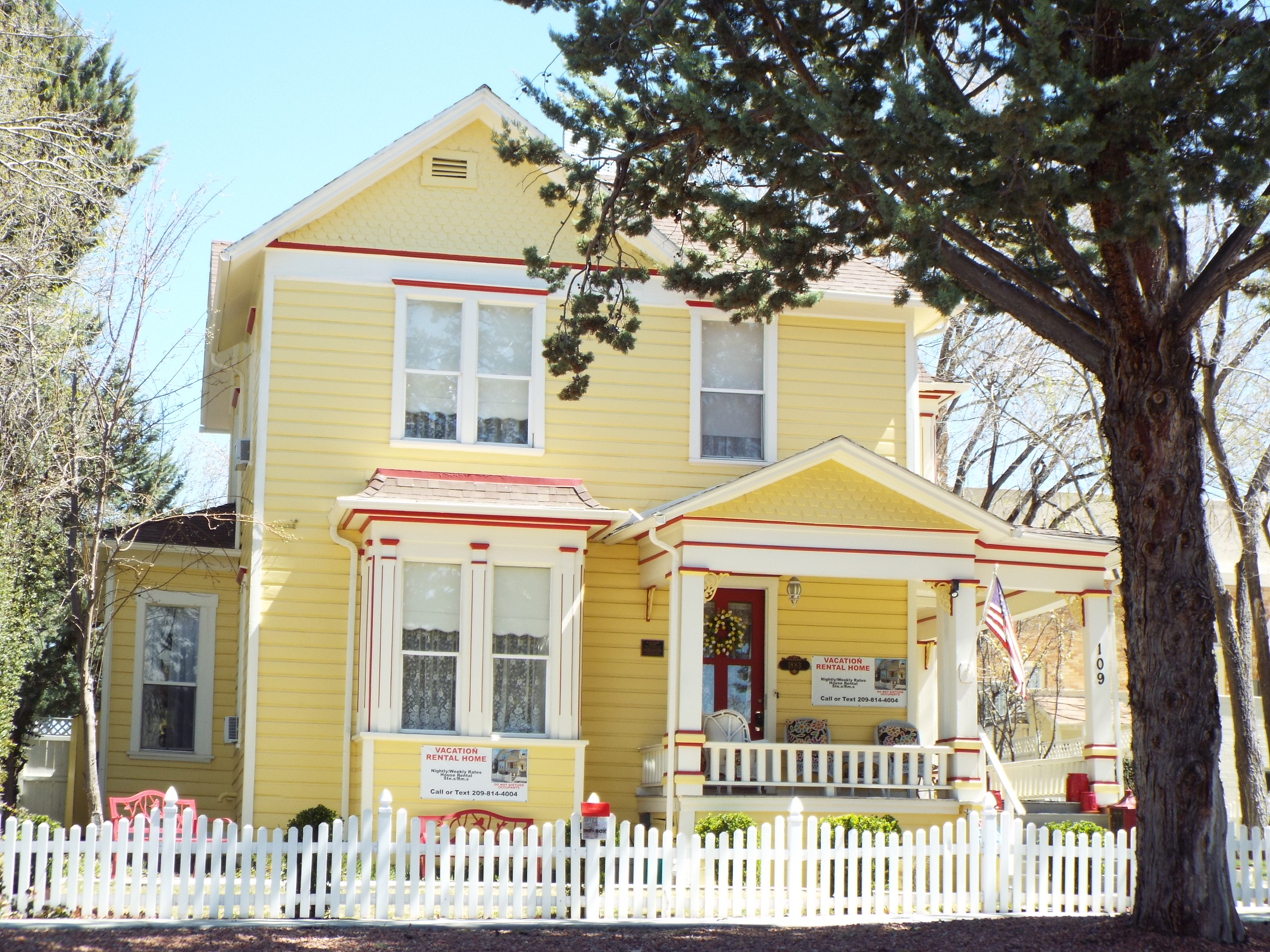
Clark House

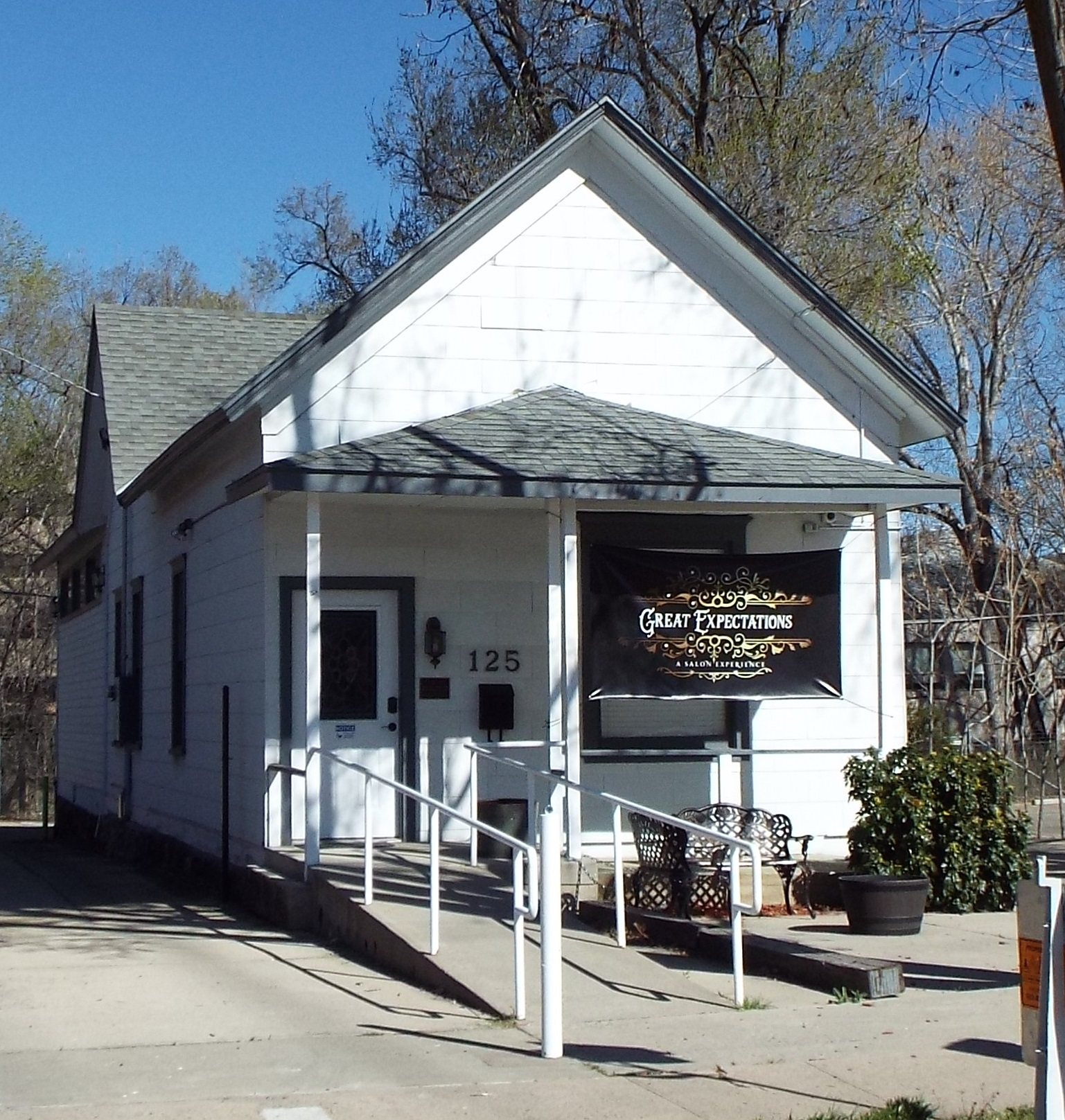
Curtis Cottage

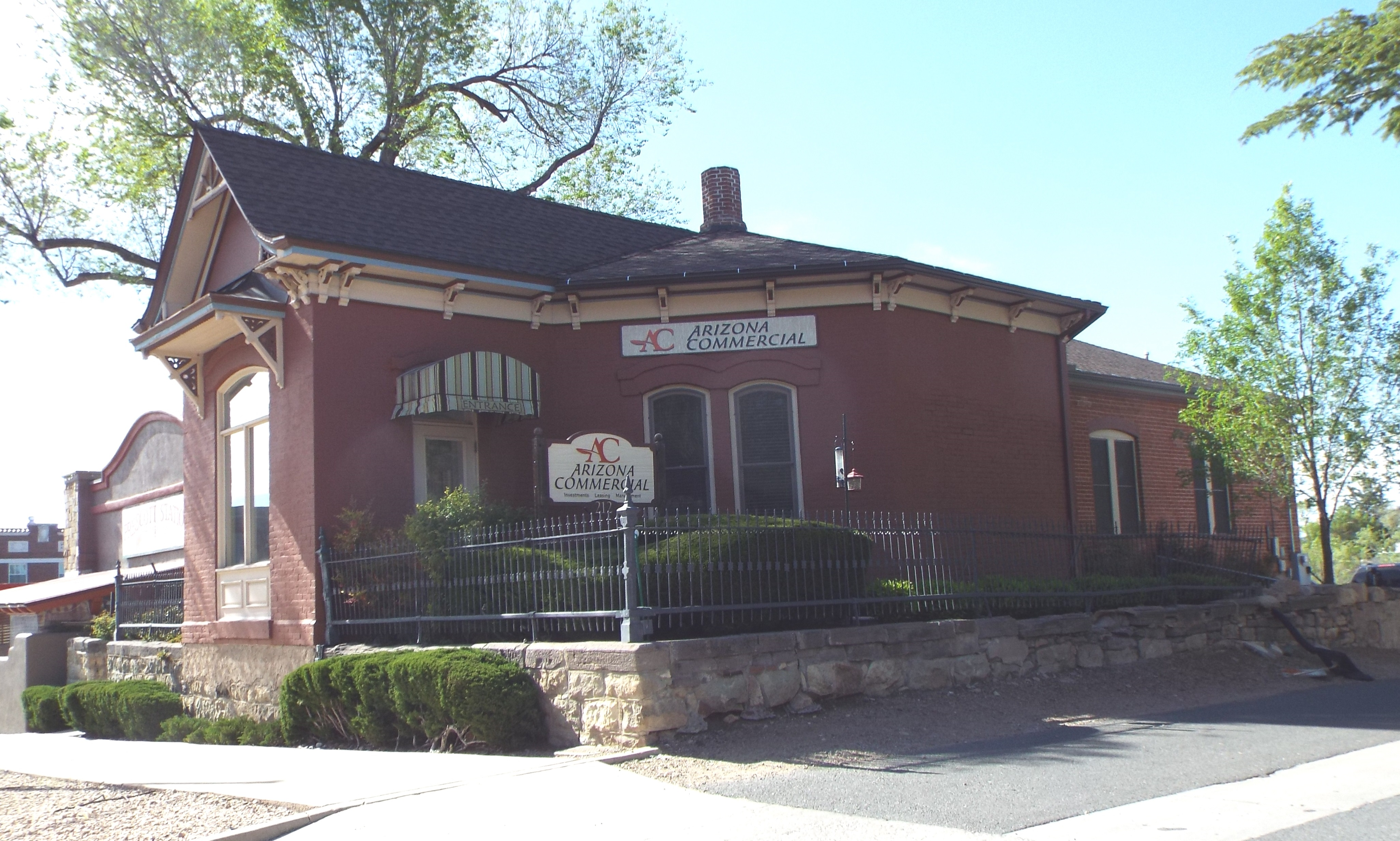
Day House

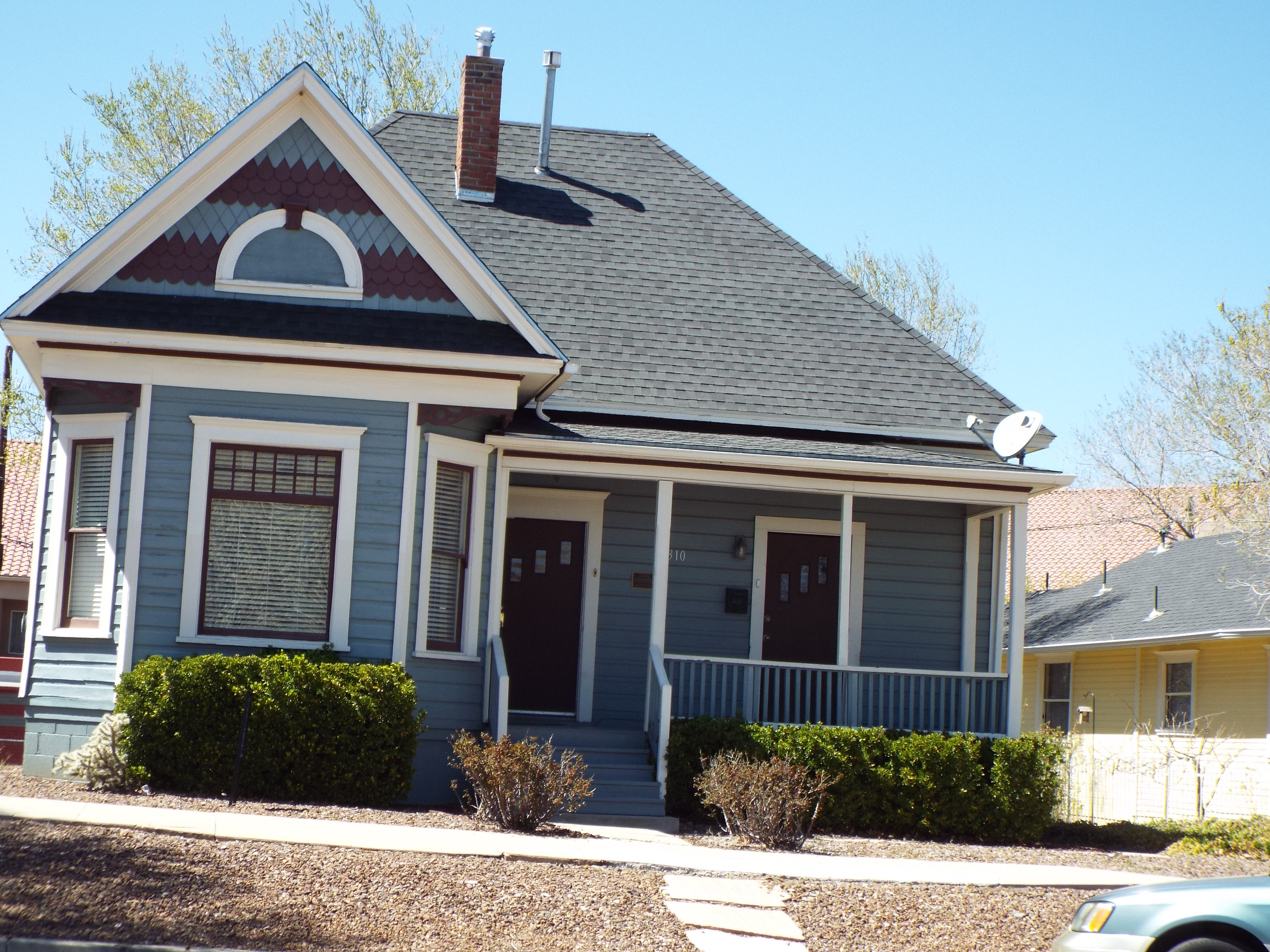
Detwiler House

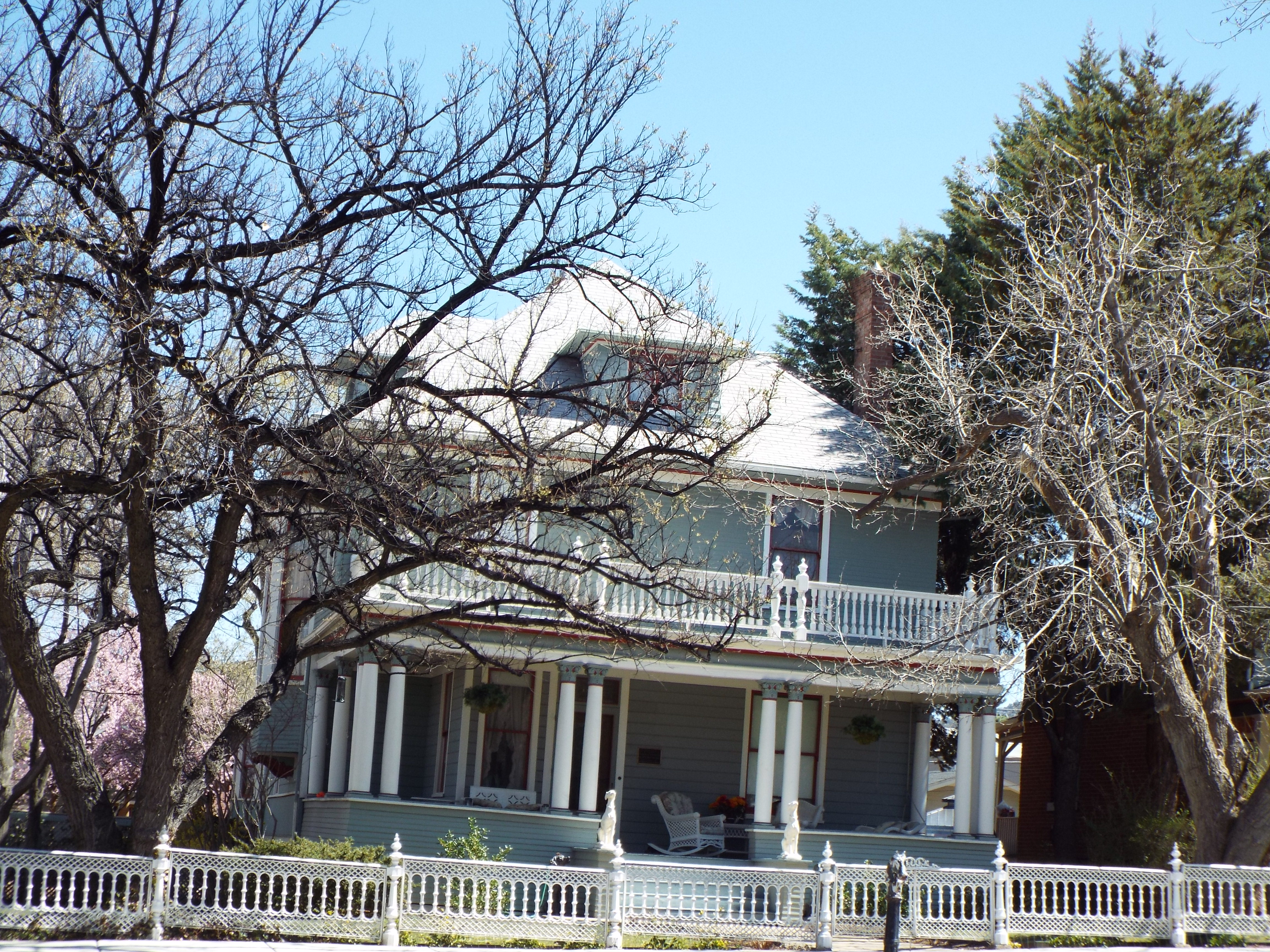
Drake House

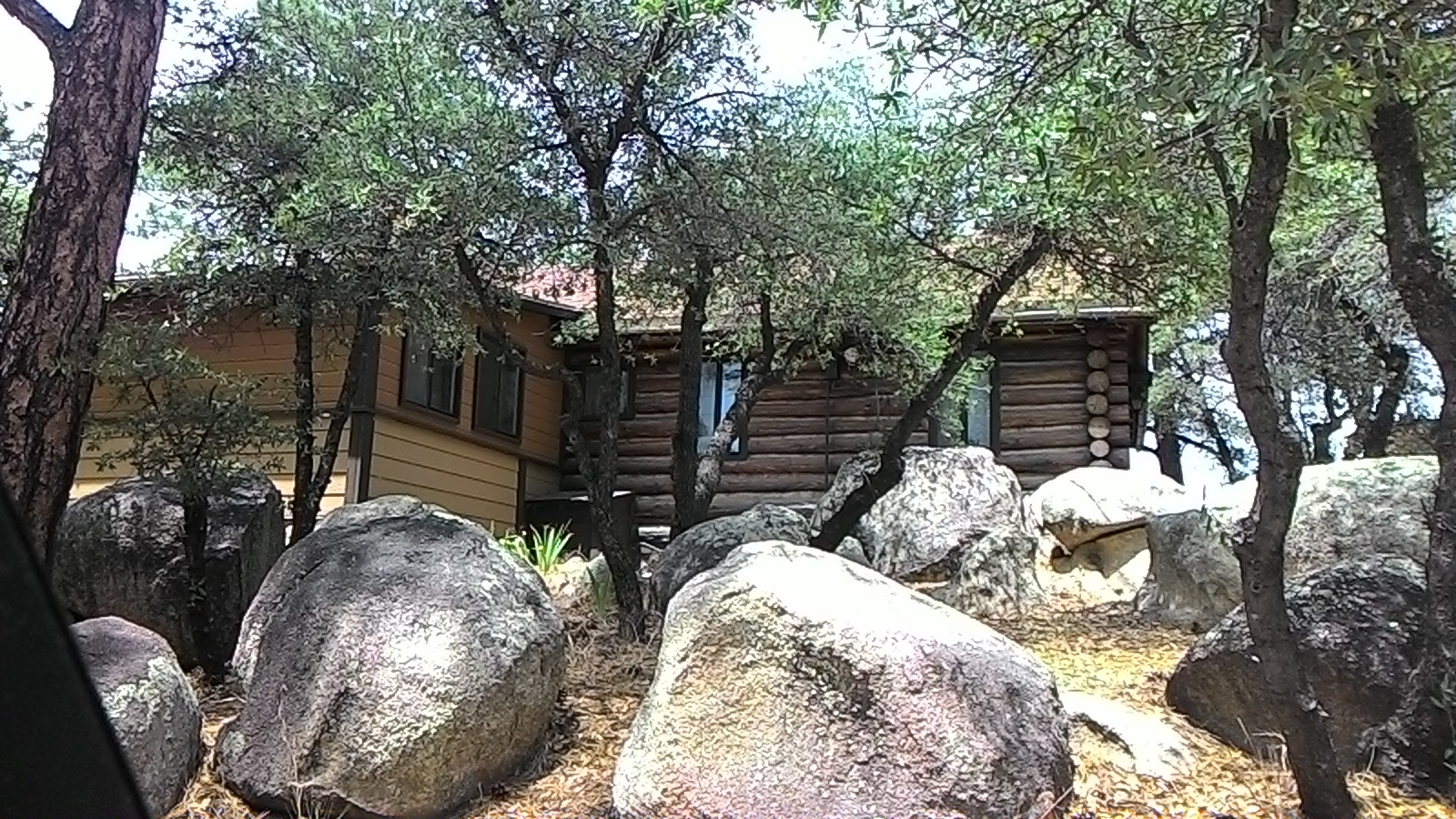
Charles H. Dunning Log Cabin

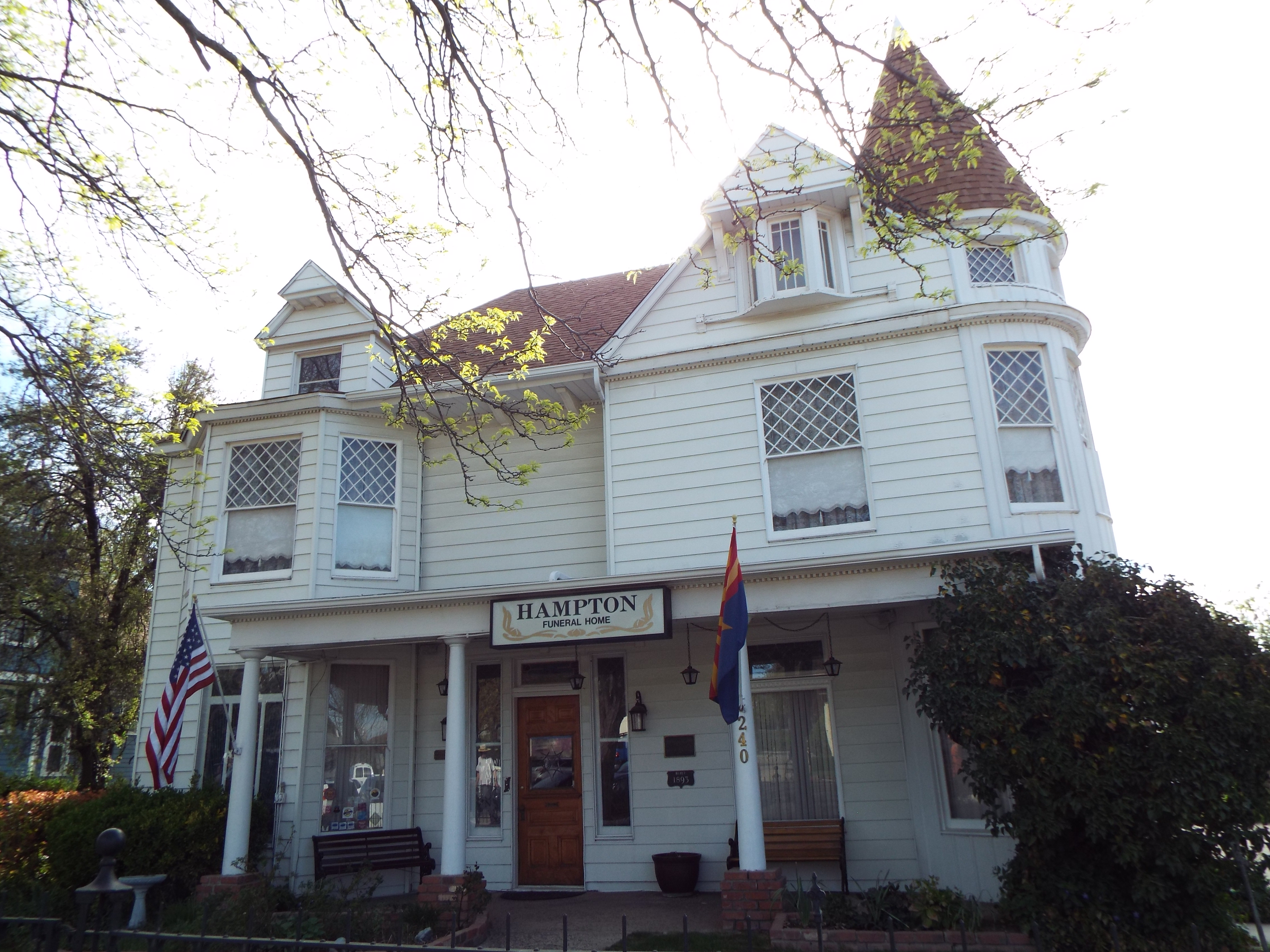
Fisher/Goldwater House

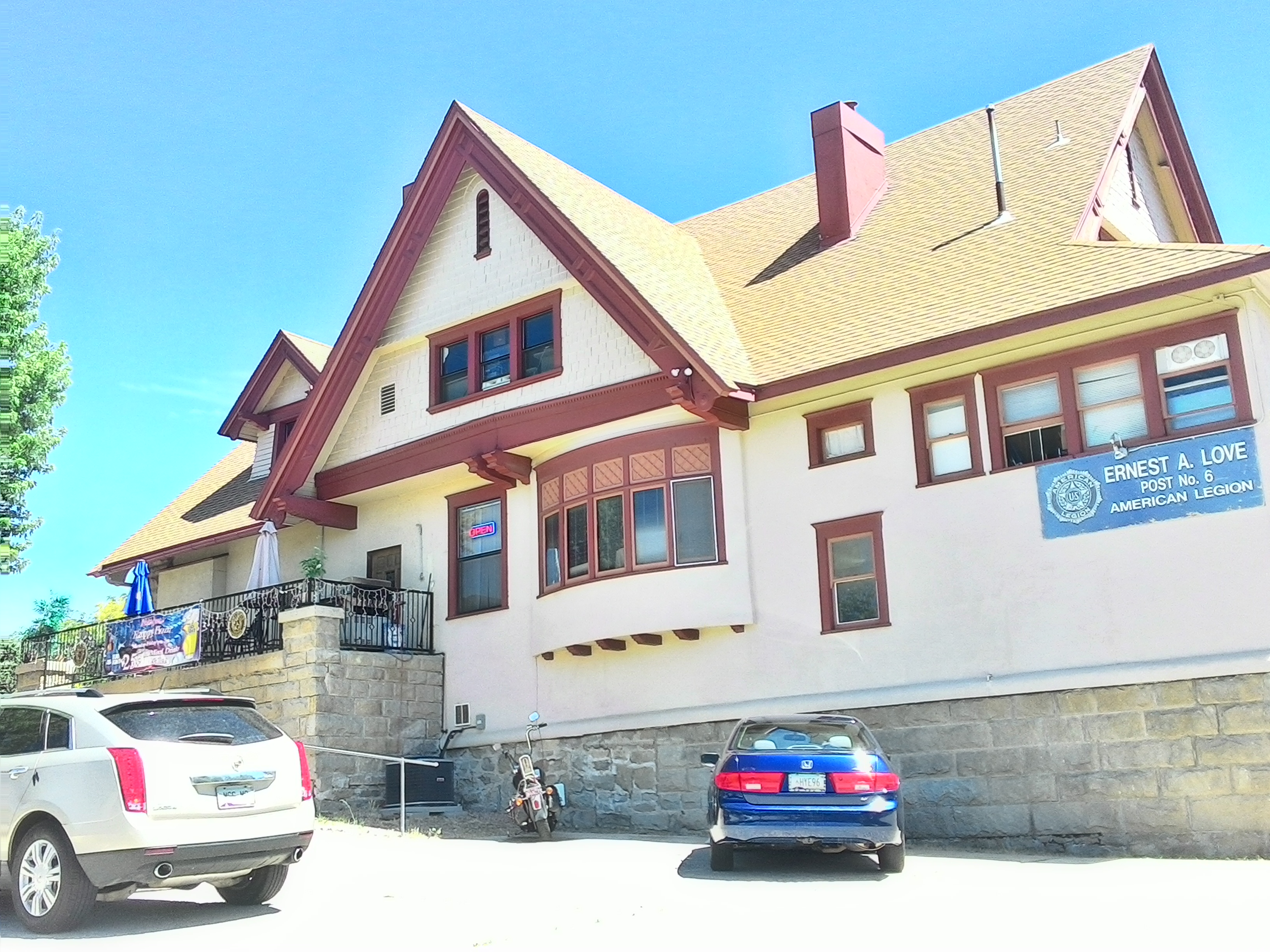
Fredericks House

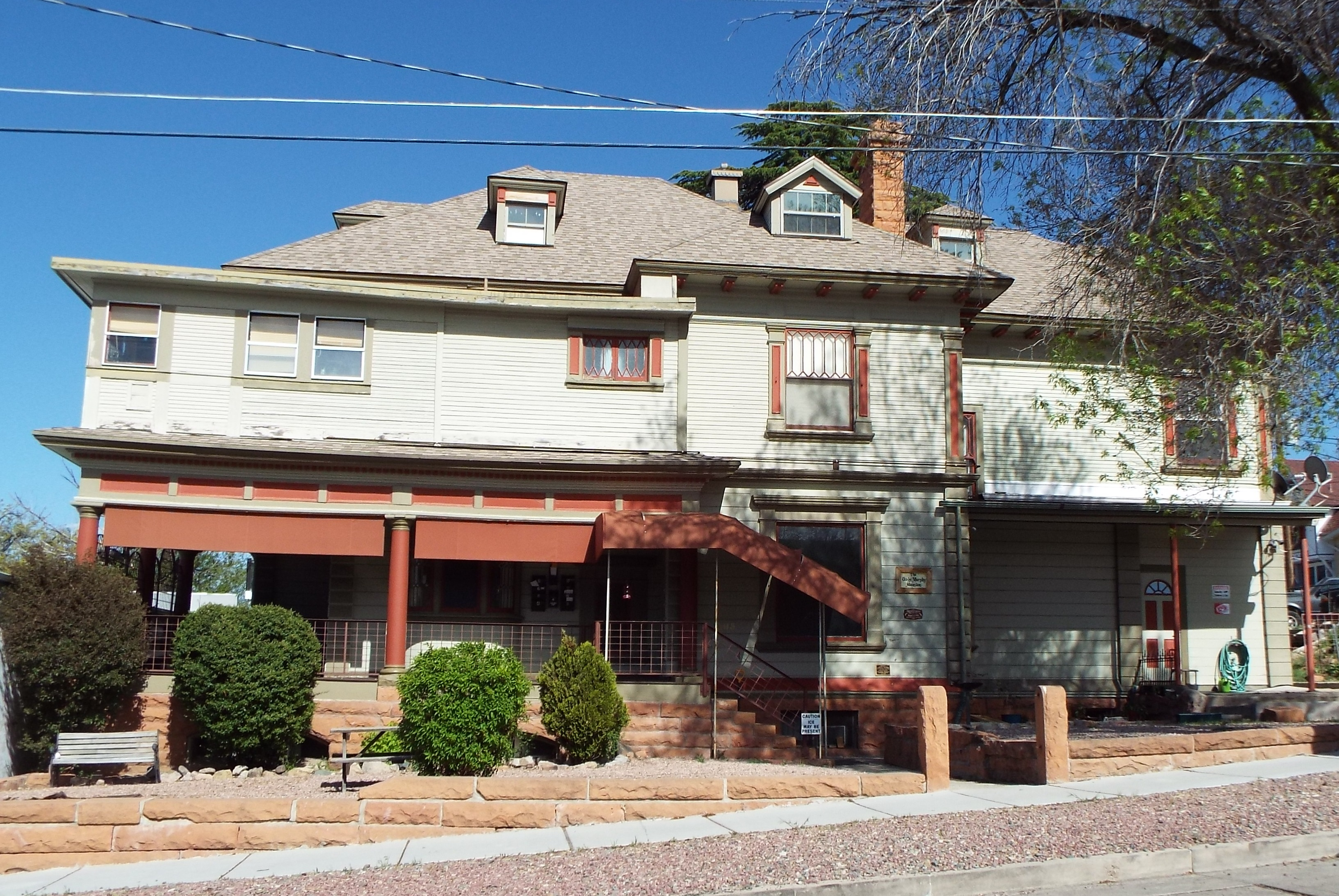
Gage/Murphy House

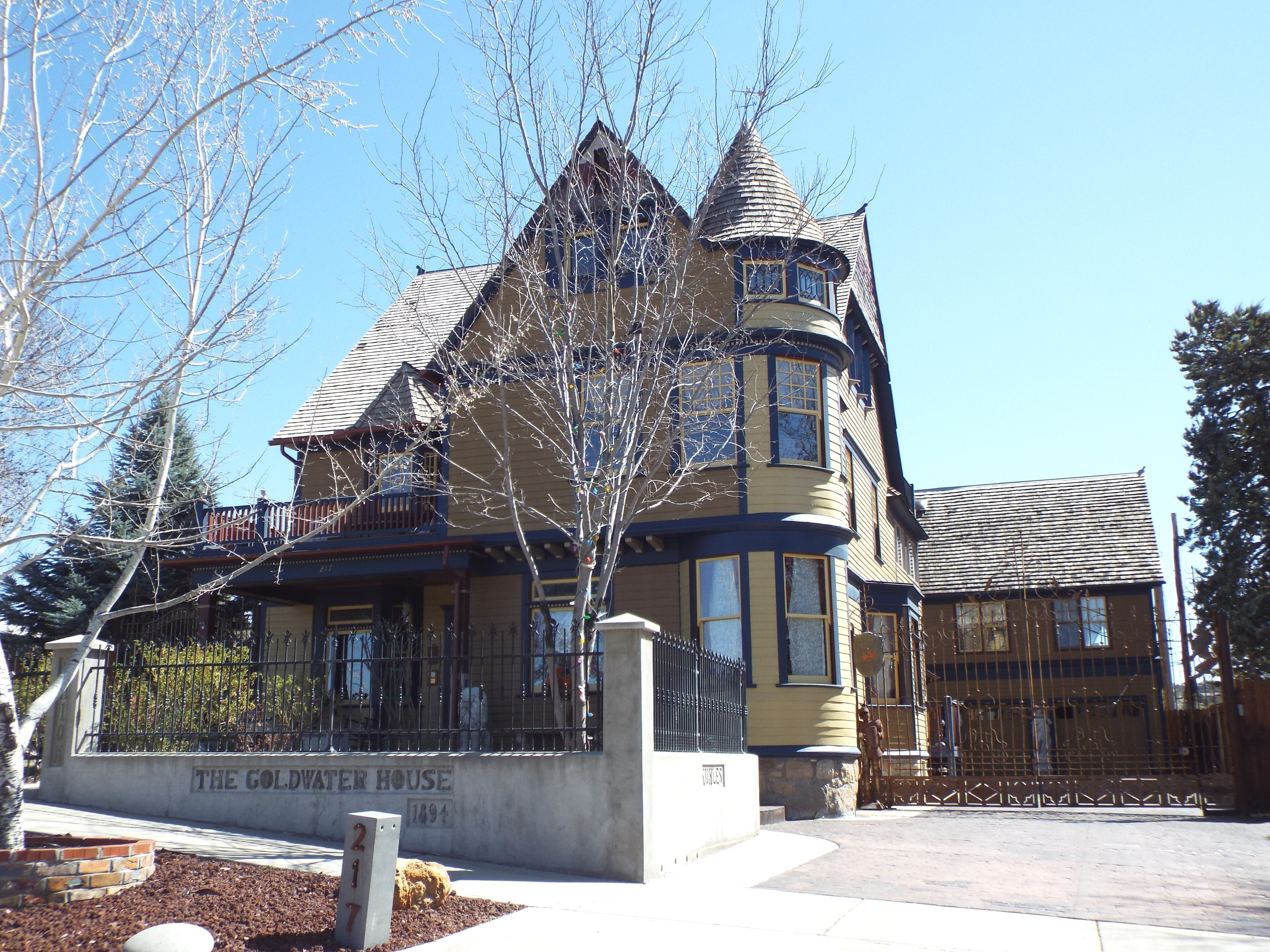
Henry Goldwater House

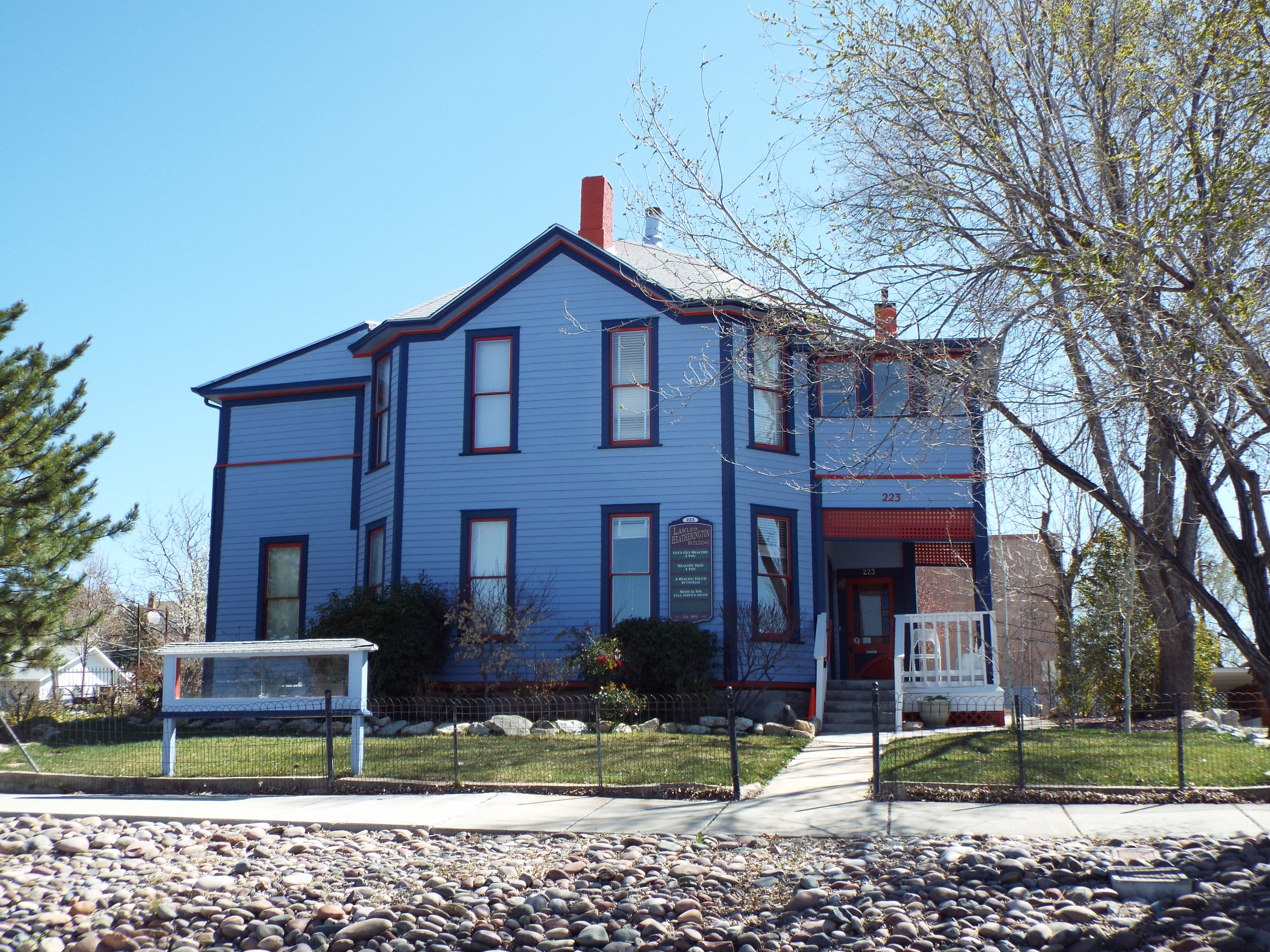
Lawler-Hetherington Double House

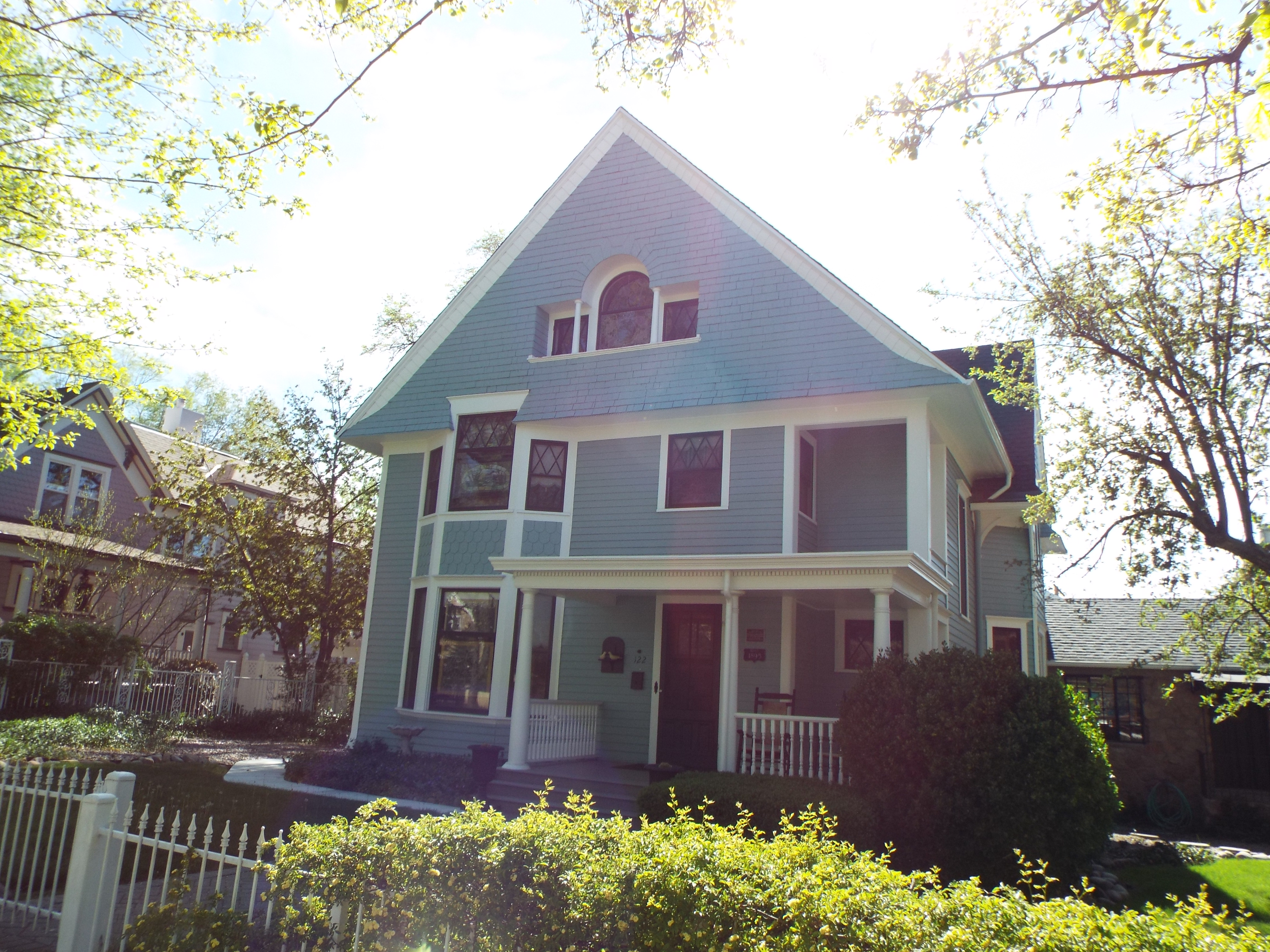
Hawkins House

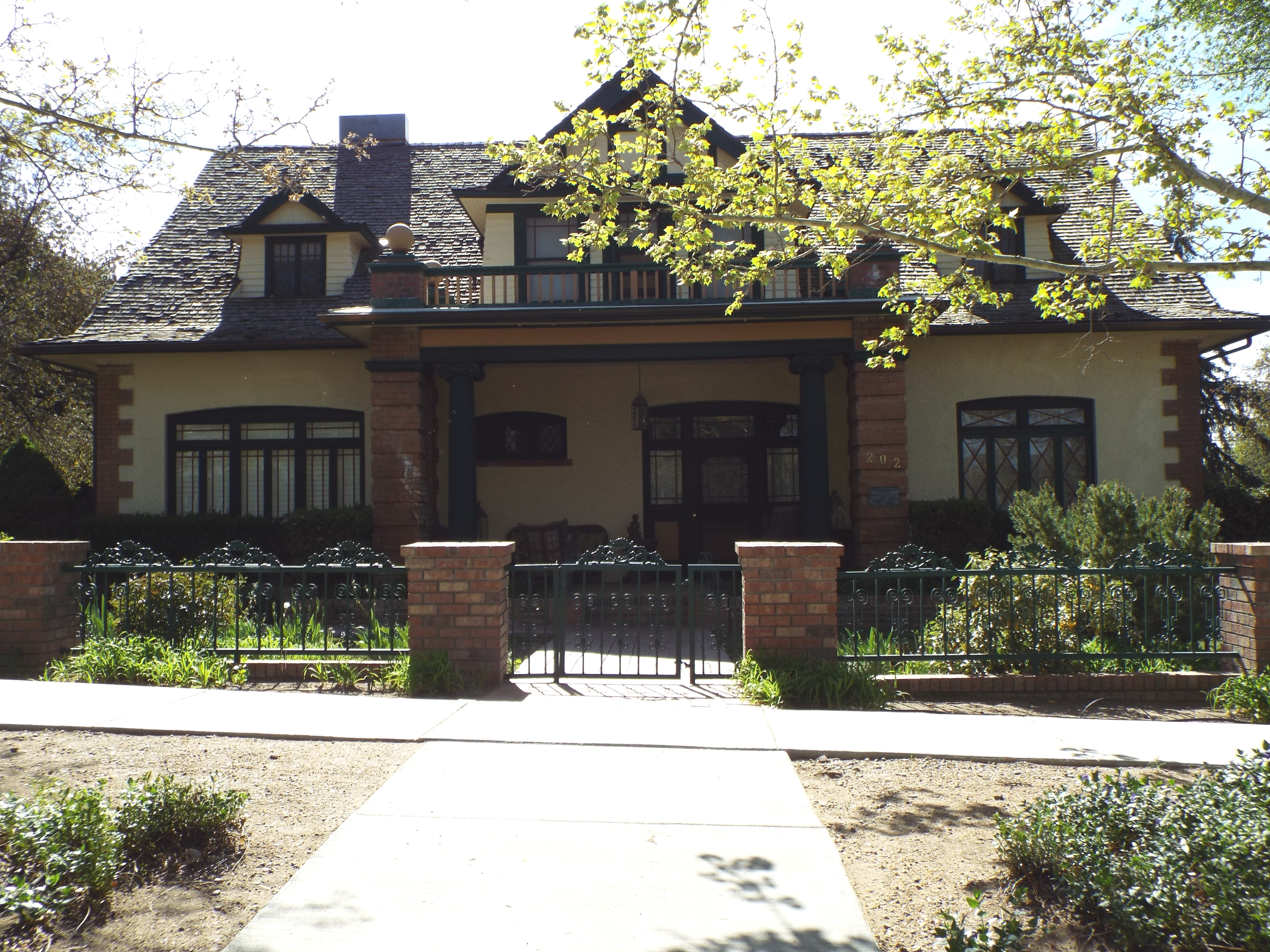
Hazeltine House

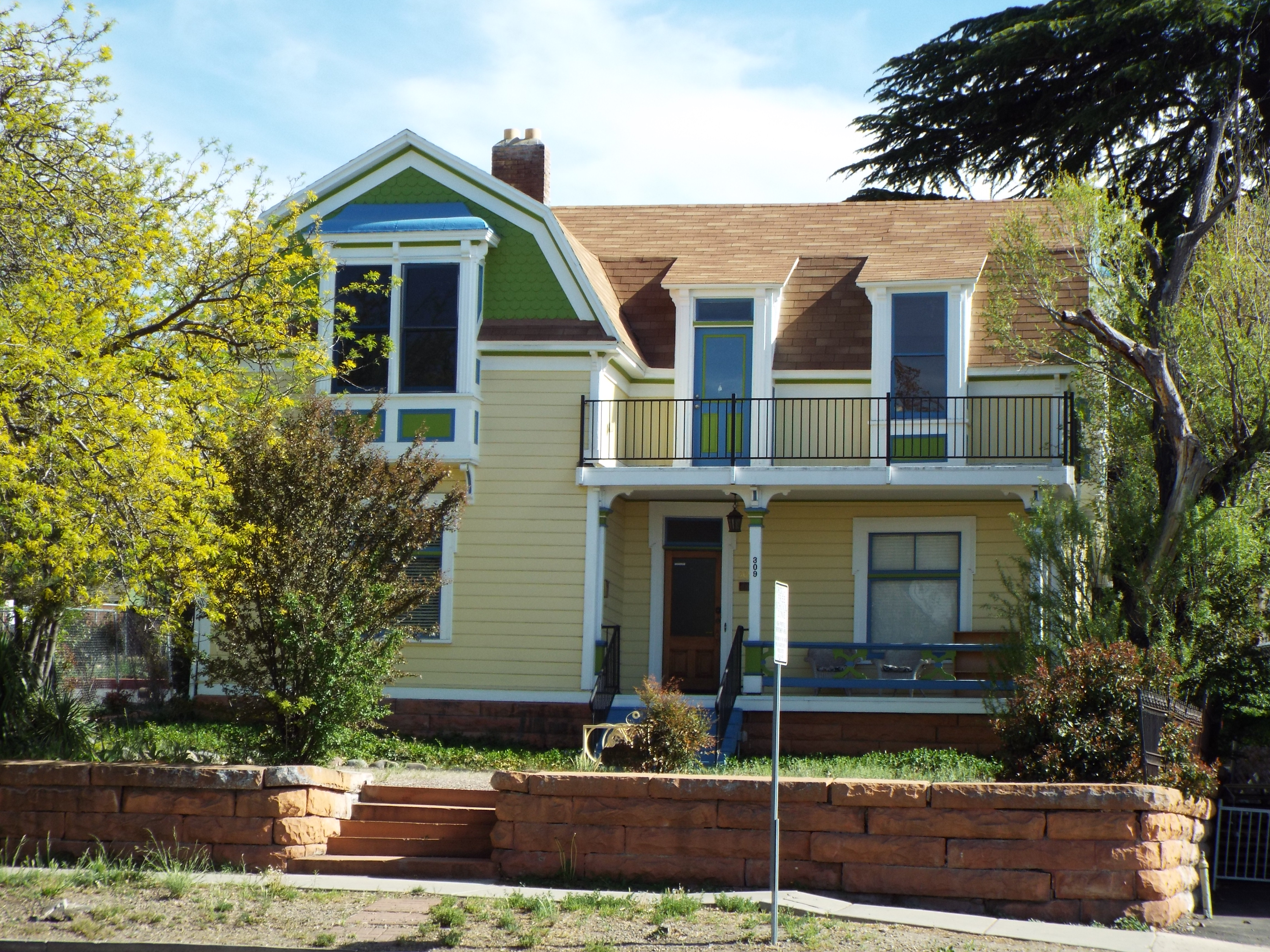
Head House

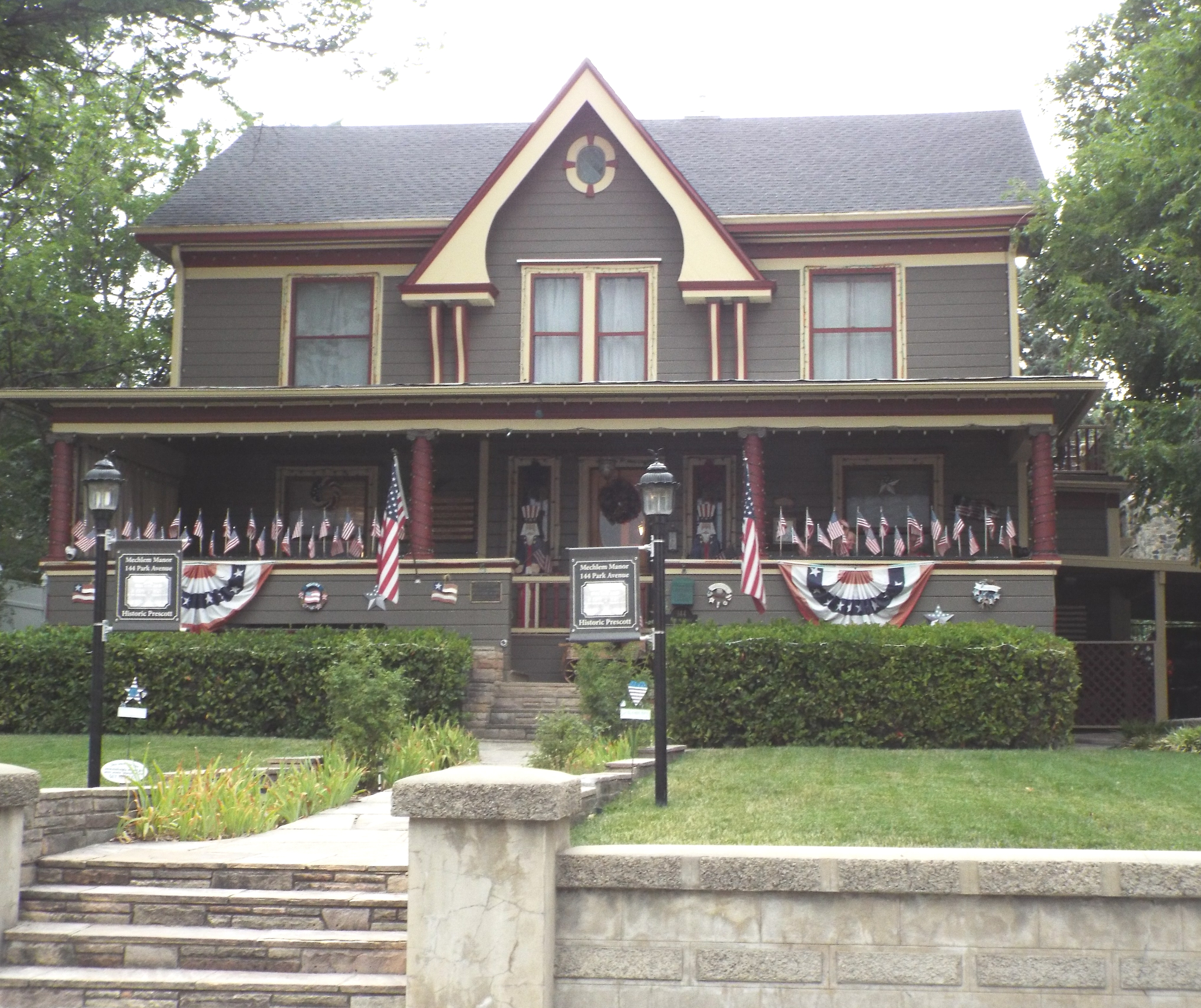
Hill House

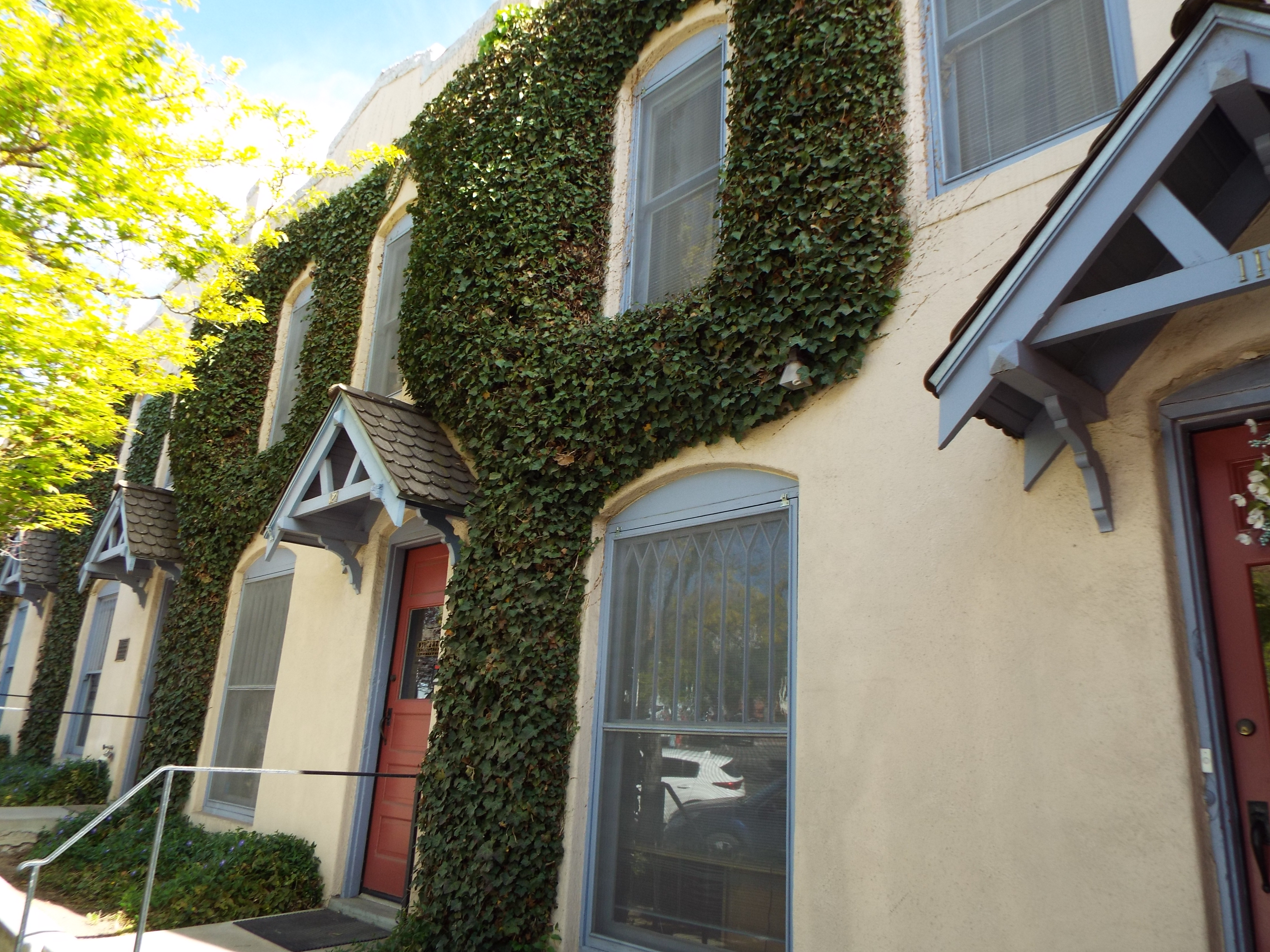
Kenwill Apartments

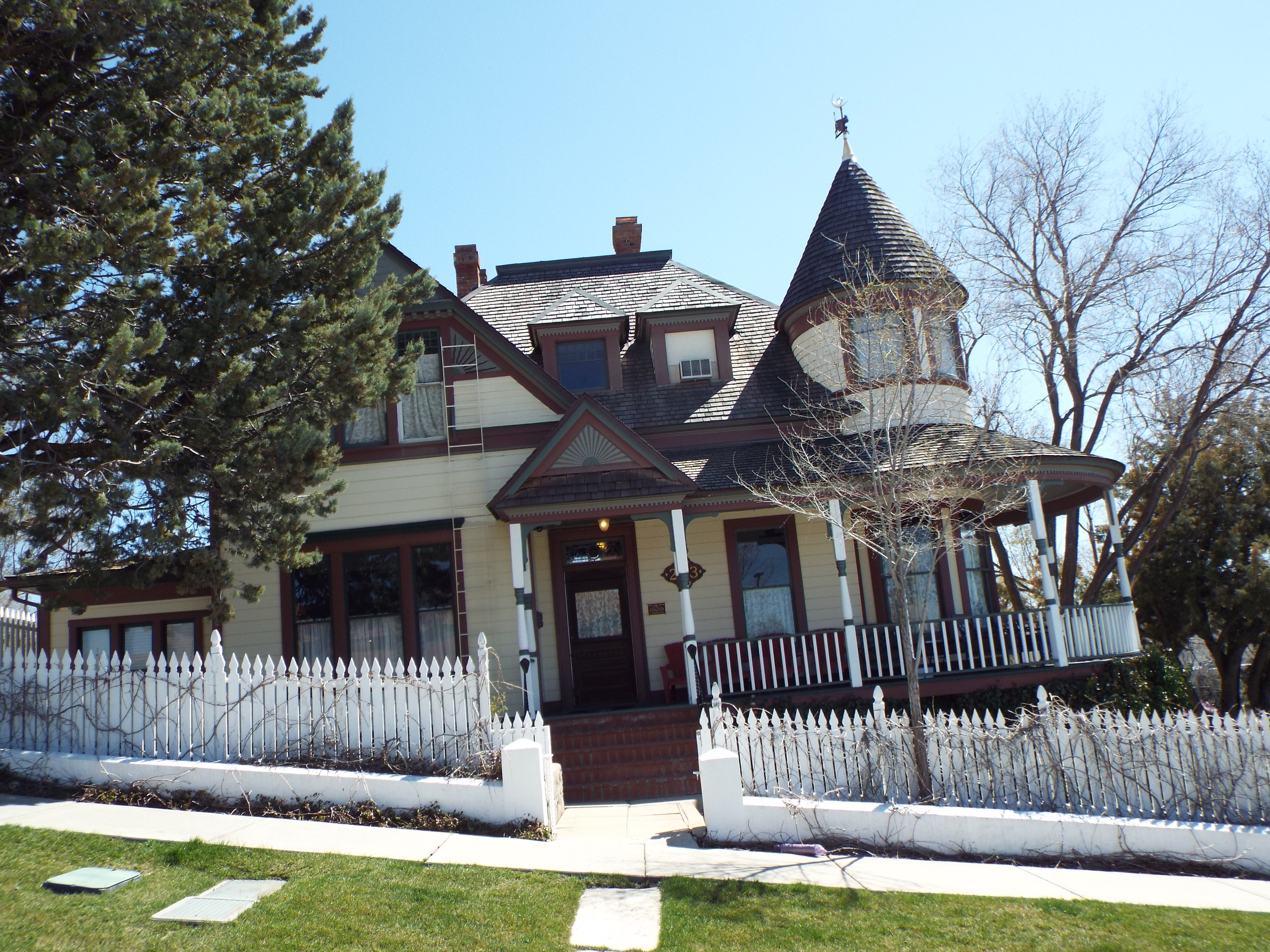
Marks House

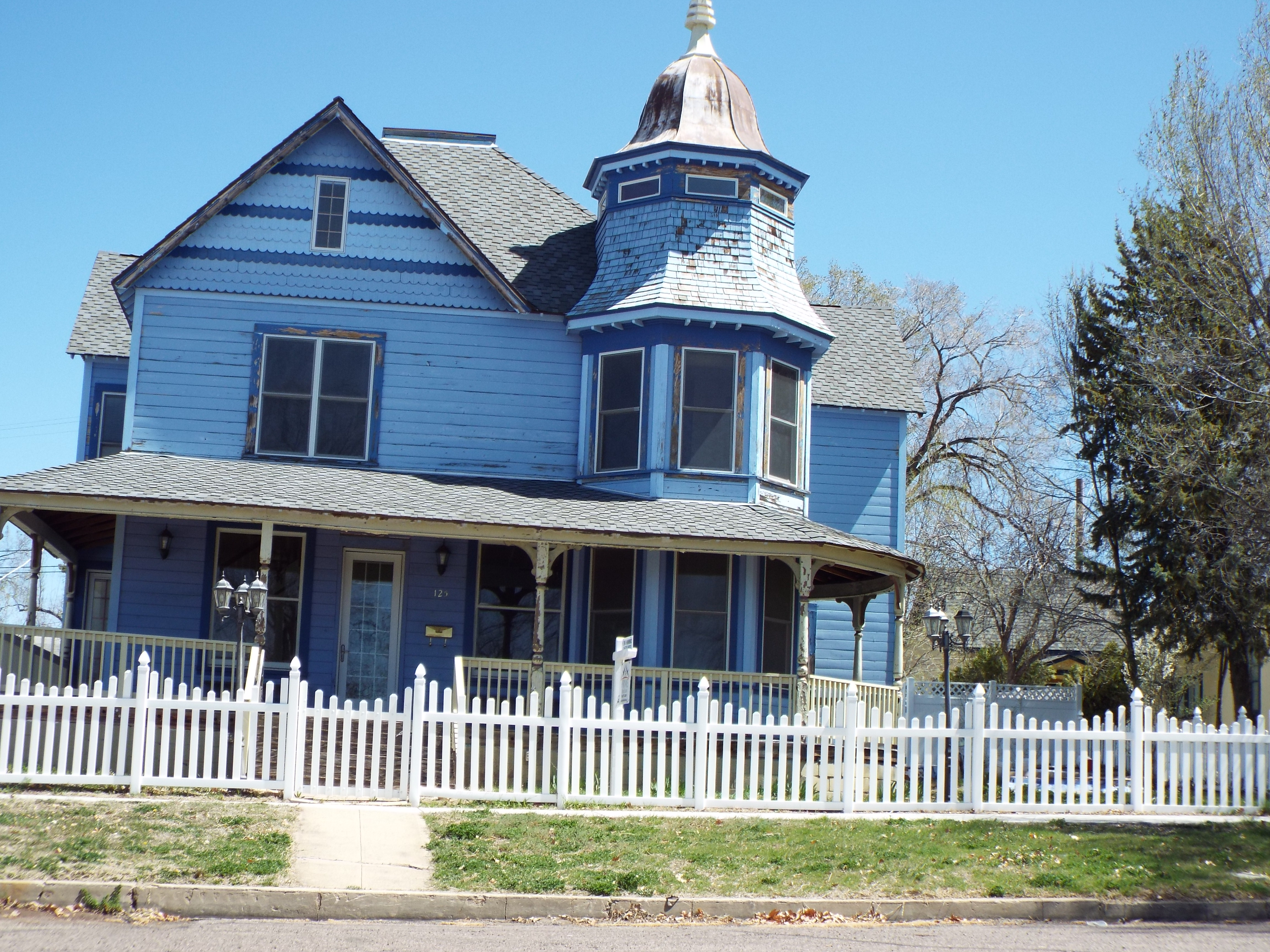
Martin/Ling House

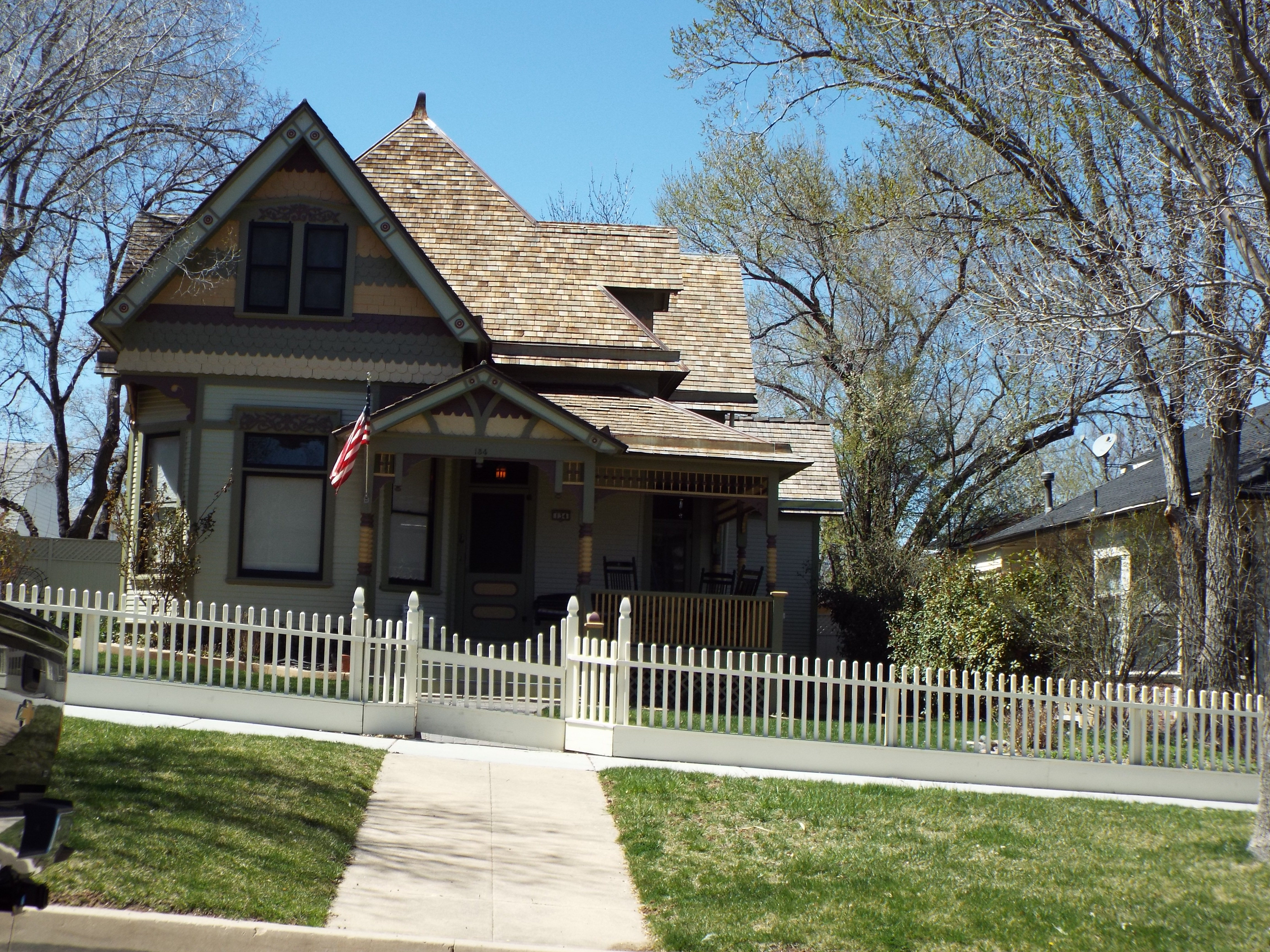
Morin House

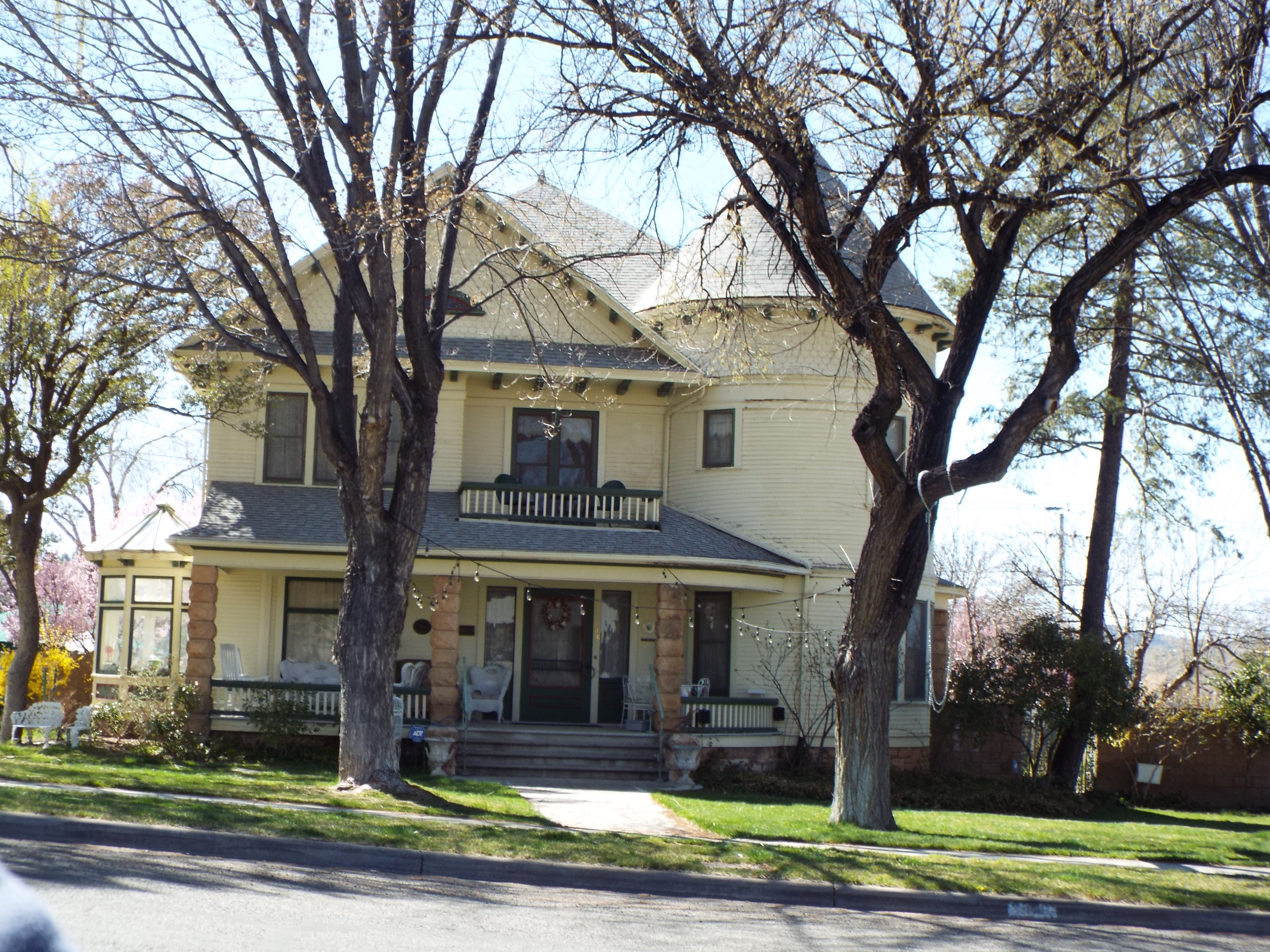
Morrison House

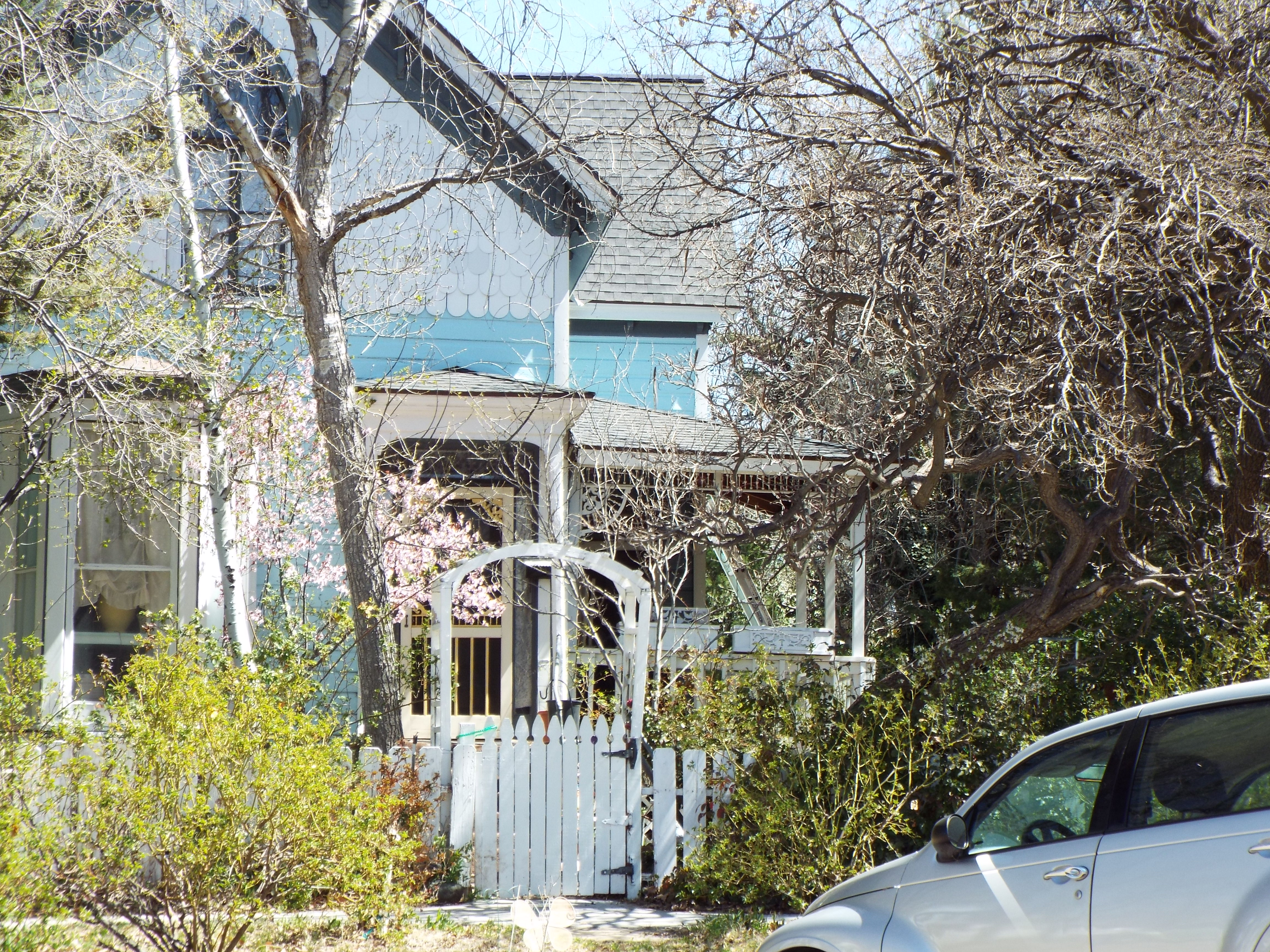
Otis House

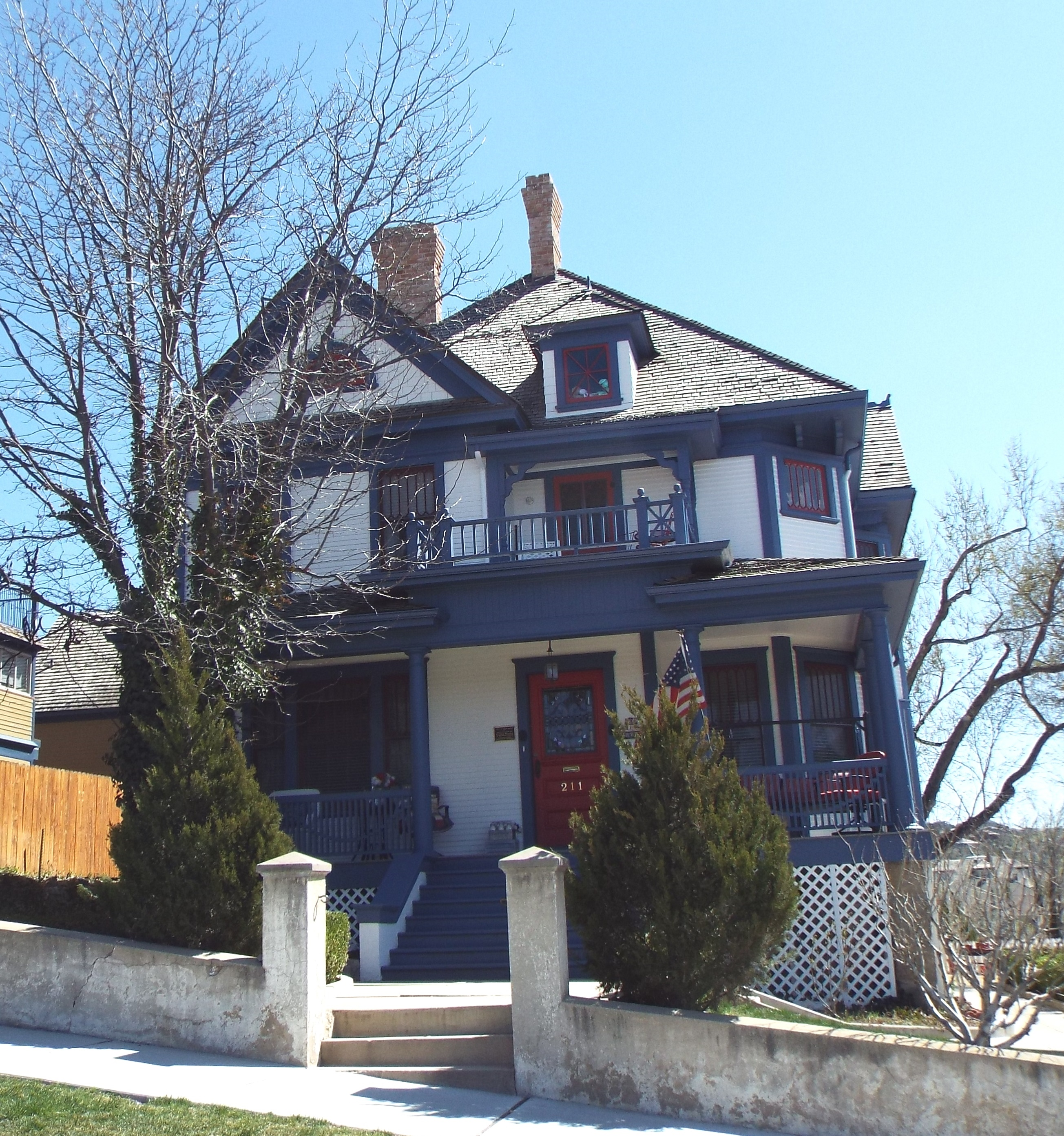
Peters House

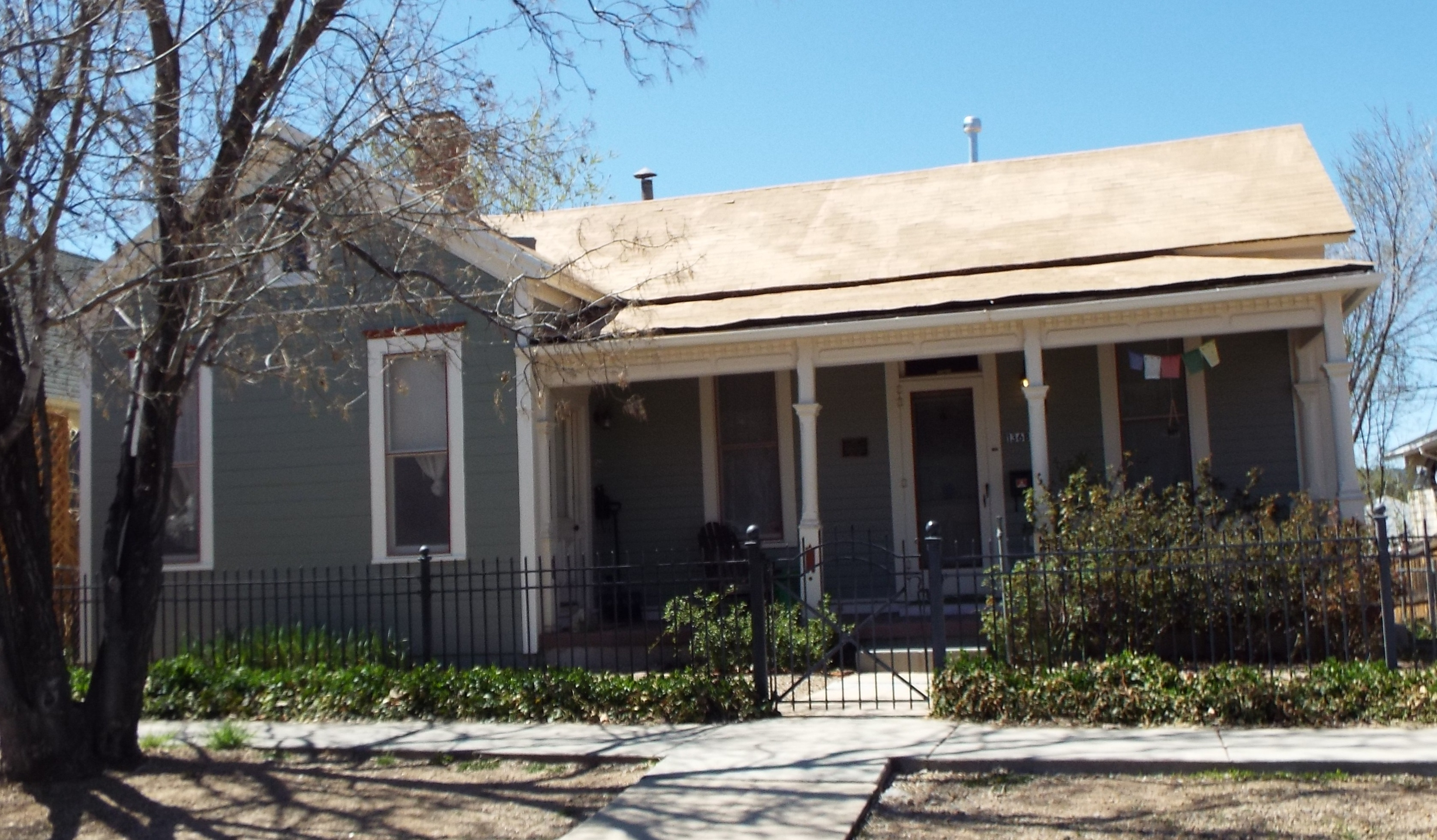
Roberts House

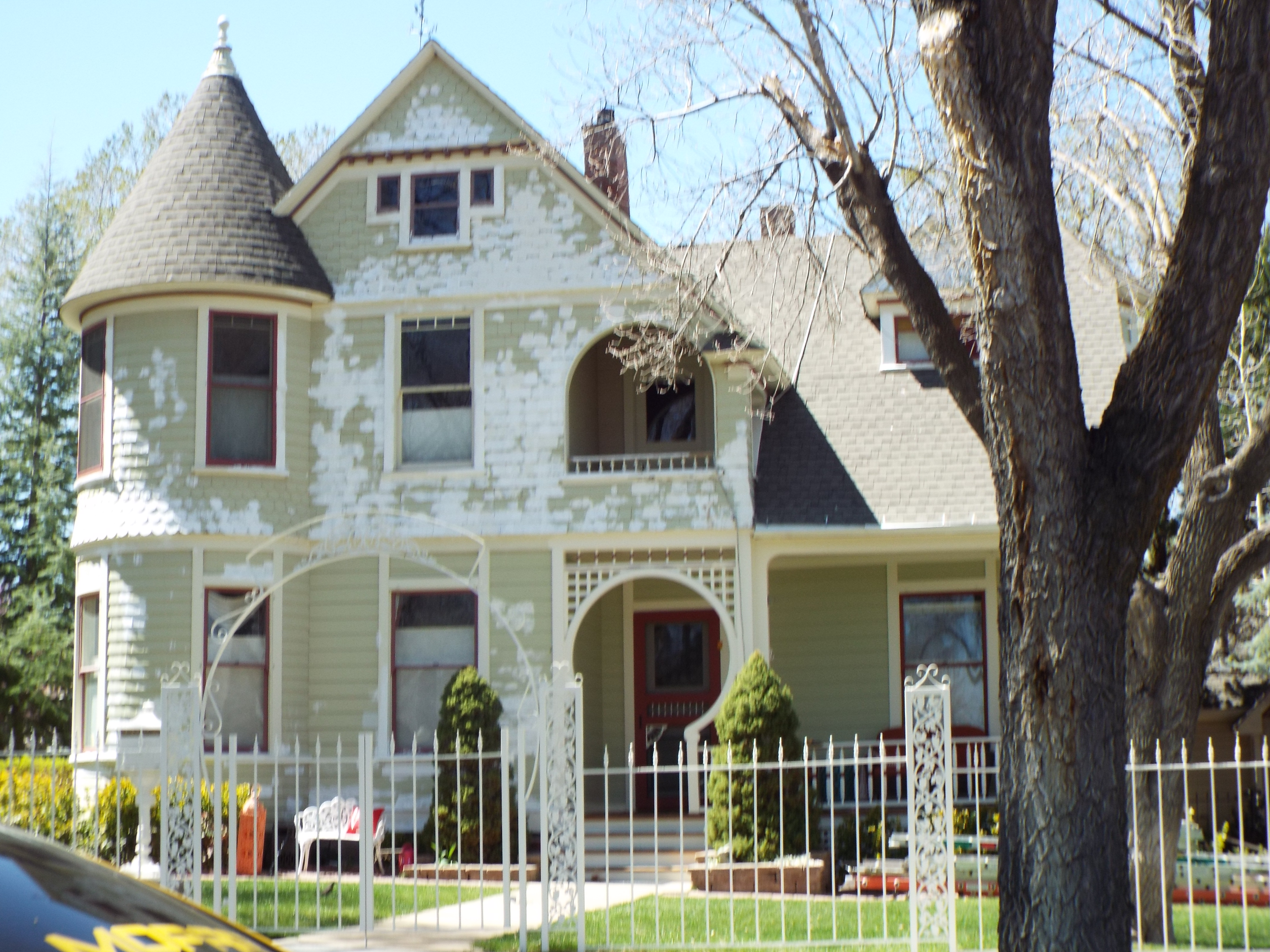
Sewall House

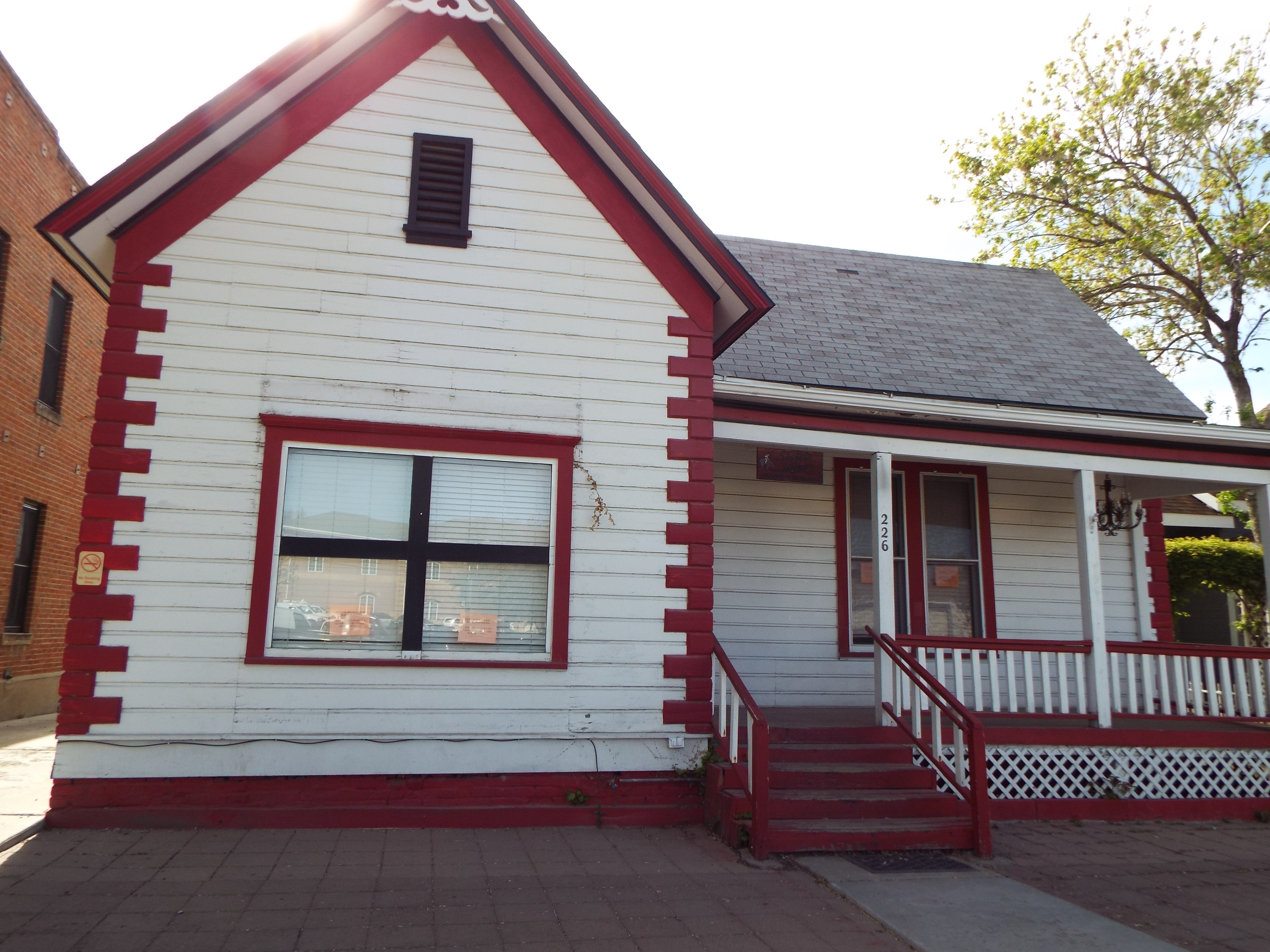
Shekels House

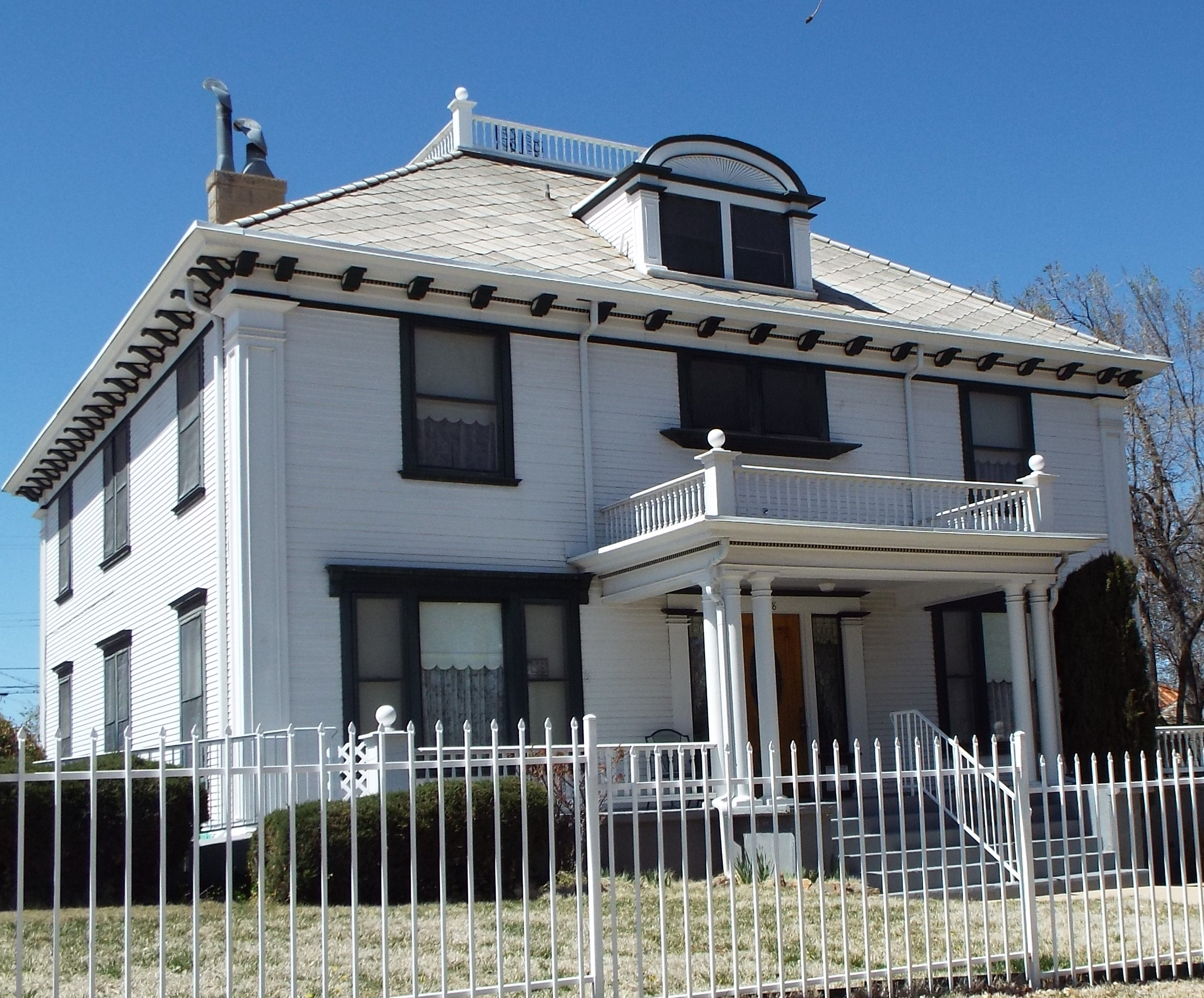
Sloan House

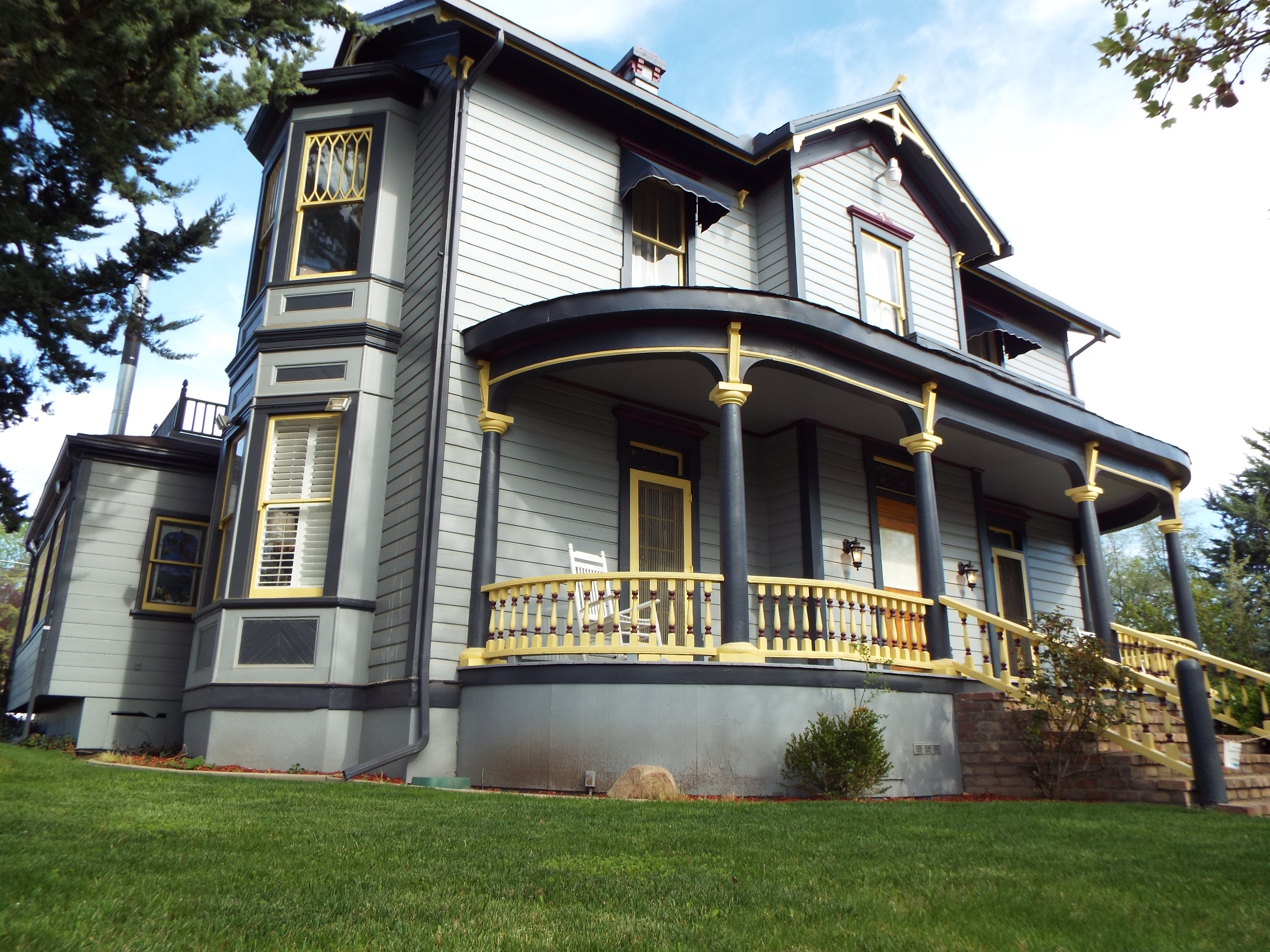
Wells House

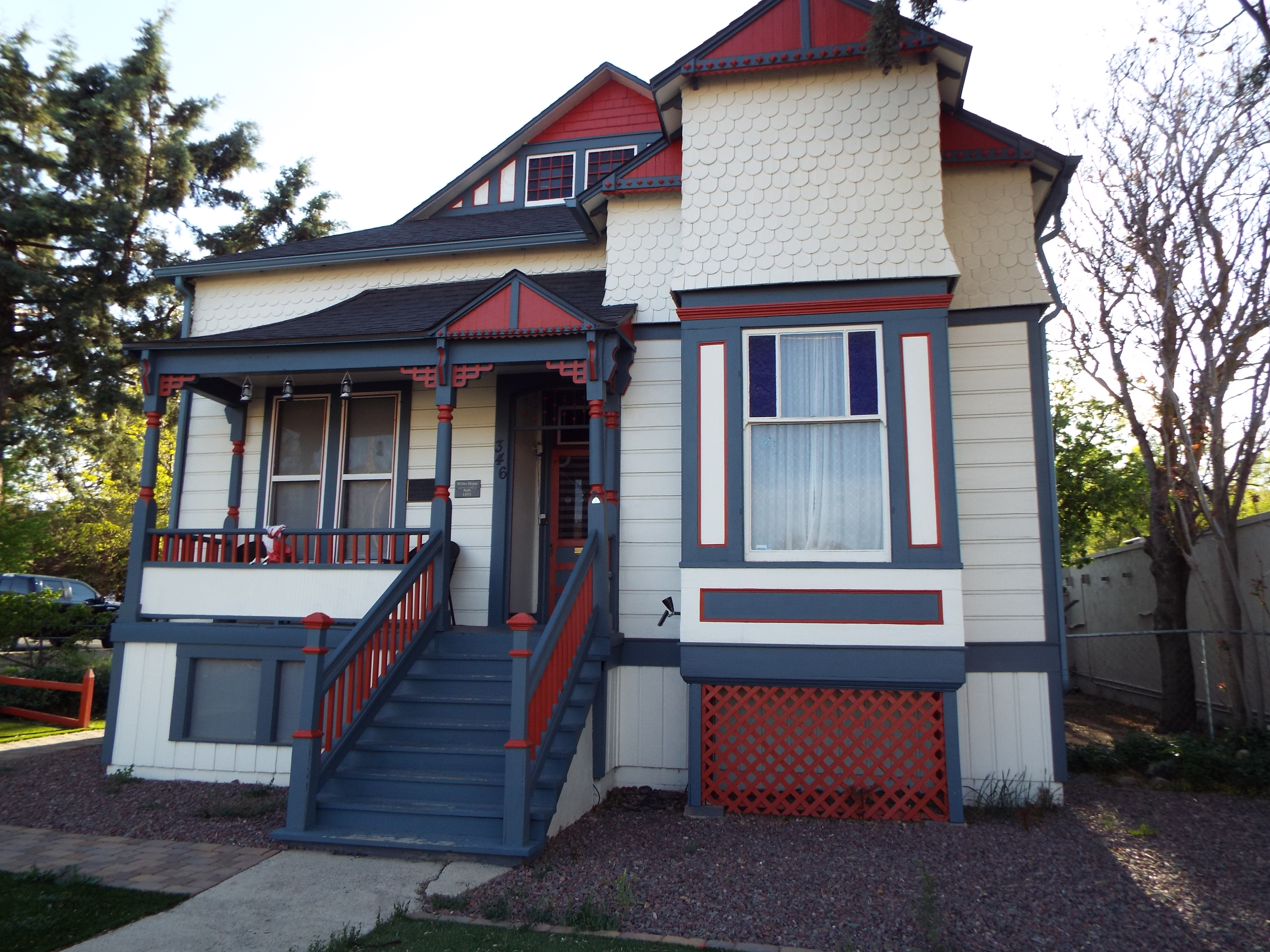
Wilder House

== Sharlot Hall Museum ==
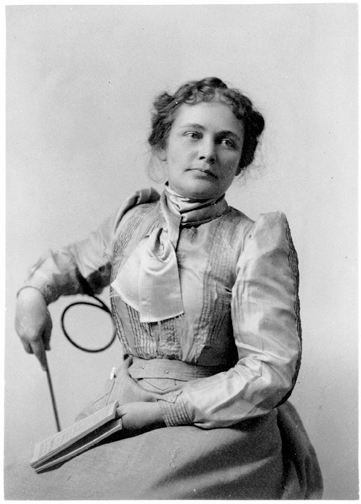
Sharlot Hall

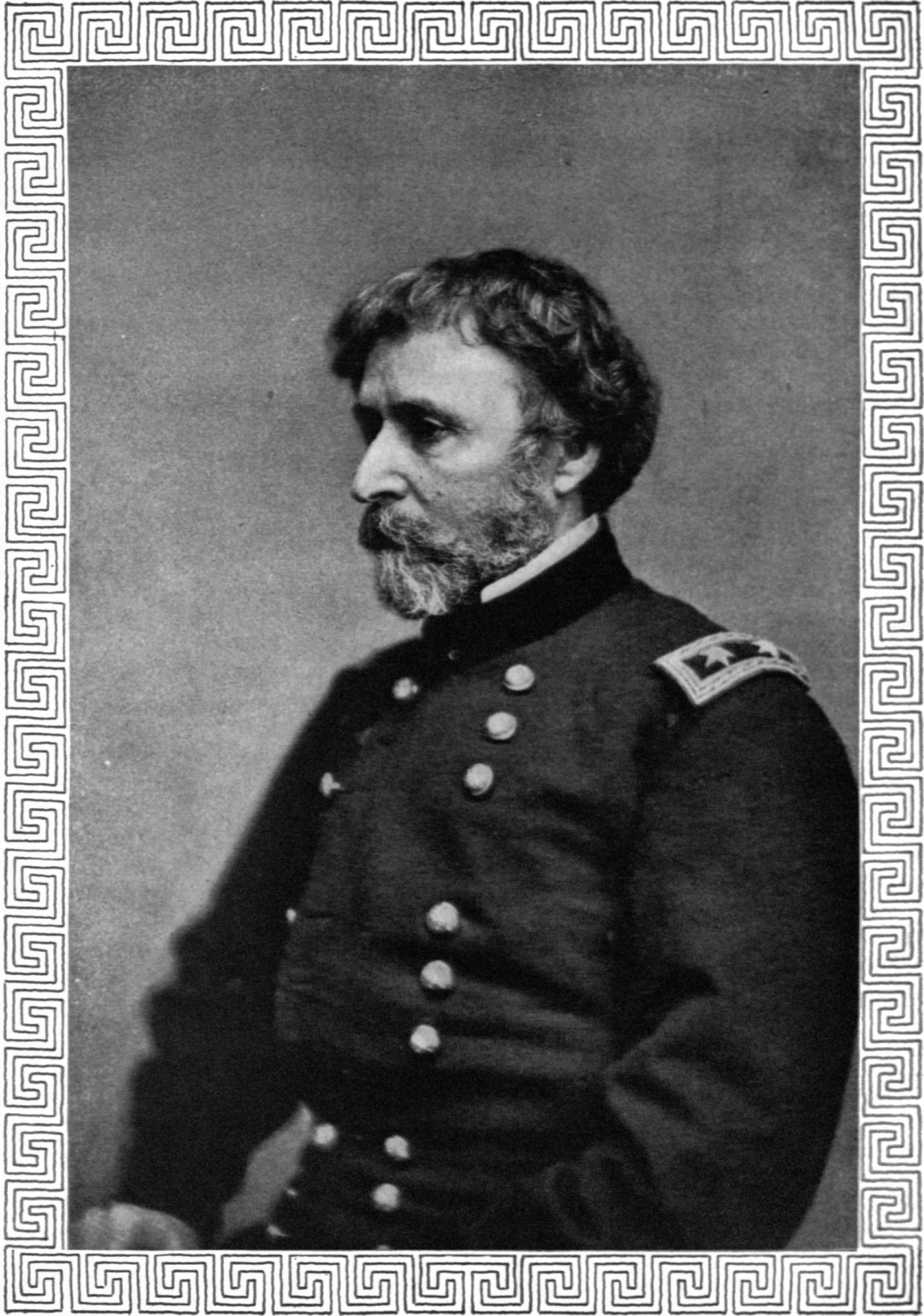
Major General John C. Frémont

The Sharlot Hall Museum was named after Sharlot Hall who in 1909 was appointed territorial historian. As such, she became the first woman to hold public office in the Arizona. Two of the exhibits are individually listed in the National Register of Historic Places. They are the Governor's Mansion listed on September 10, 1971, reference #71000121 and the Iron Turbine Windmill which was listed July 9, 1981, reference #81000139. Among the outside exhibits which are pictured are the following:

- The Old Governor's Mansion built in 1864. The served as the residence of the Territorial Governor John Goodwin who established the territorial capital of Arizona in Prescott. The mansion has various rooms: the governor's office, a dining room, a bedroom and a storage room with all the miscellaneous objects that would have been in a 19th-century house.
- The Bashford House built in 1877, the William C. Bashford house is Victorian styled house.
- The Fremont House built in 1875. This house served as the residence of the territory's fifth governor, John Fremont.
- Fort Misery A log cabin built in 1864. It is the oldest log building associated with the Arizona Territory.
- The 'Ranch House was built in the 1930s. The single roomed Ranch House had a kitchen, bedroom and bathroom.
- The Transportation Building built in 1937. It once housed Jacob's Mechanical Service and Edson's Electrical Service. Today, it holds the Museum's vehicle collection, which includes a stagecoach used in Tombstone, Arizona (and held up at least one time); a Conestoga wagon once driven from Yuma, Arizona to Massachusetts; an 1886 Columbia Ordinary Bicycle; a 1917 Ford Model T truck used for years in the Prescott area; and Sharlot Hall's personal Durant Star Touring car.
- The Sharlot Hall Building, constructed in 1936 as a project of the Civil Works Administration and once home to Sharlot Hall, houses many of the Museum's historical exhibits.
- The Iron Turbine Windmill built in 1876. The historic windmill was added to the National Register of Historic Places in 1981. It is the sole known intact example of the first mass-produced all-metal windmill remaining in the Southwest and probably the United States.
- Replica of Prescott's First Community Schoolhouse which had been established in 1872.
Sharlot Hall Museum

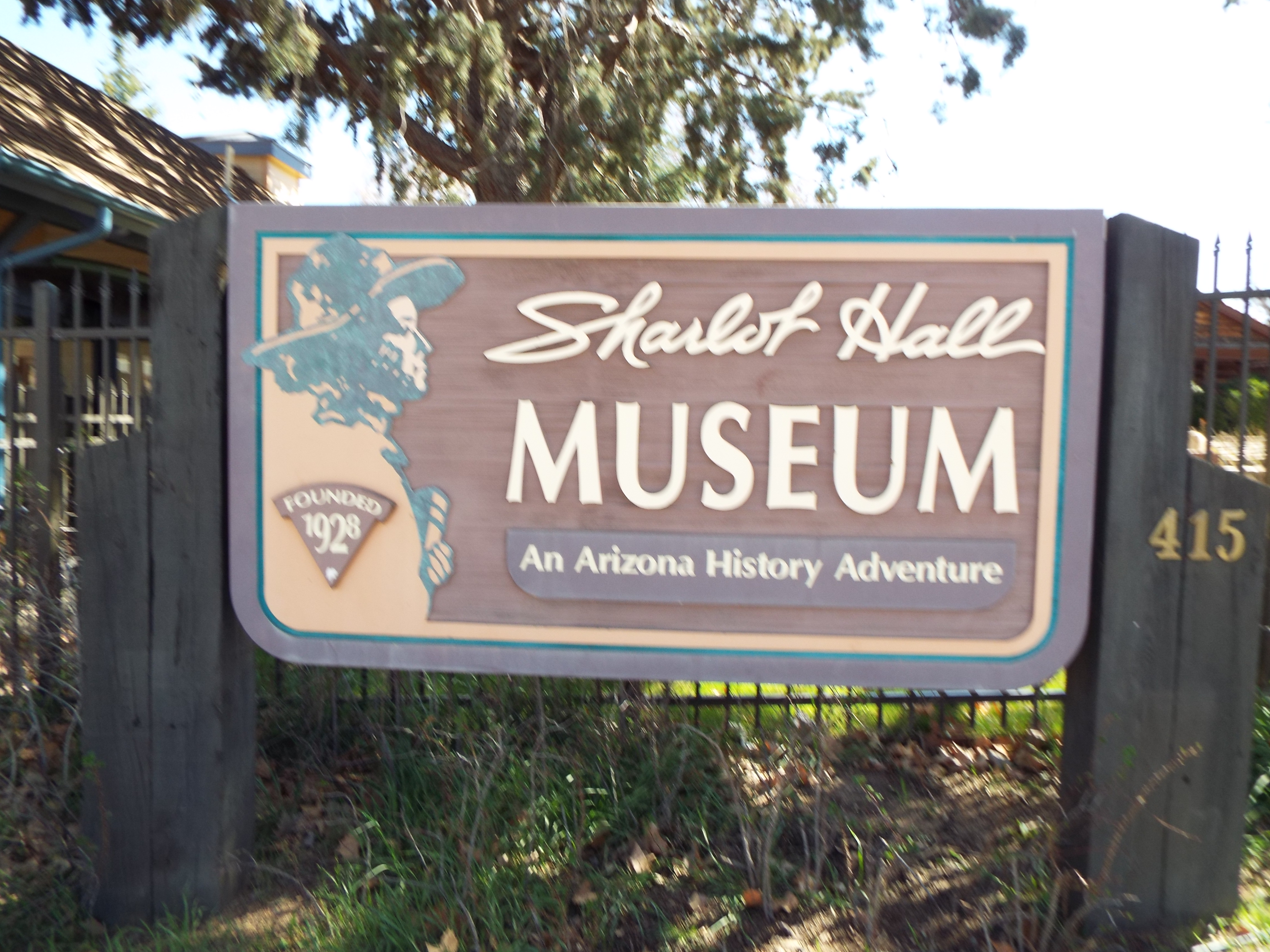
Old Governor's Mansion on the museum grounds

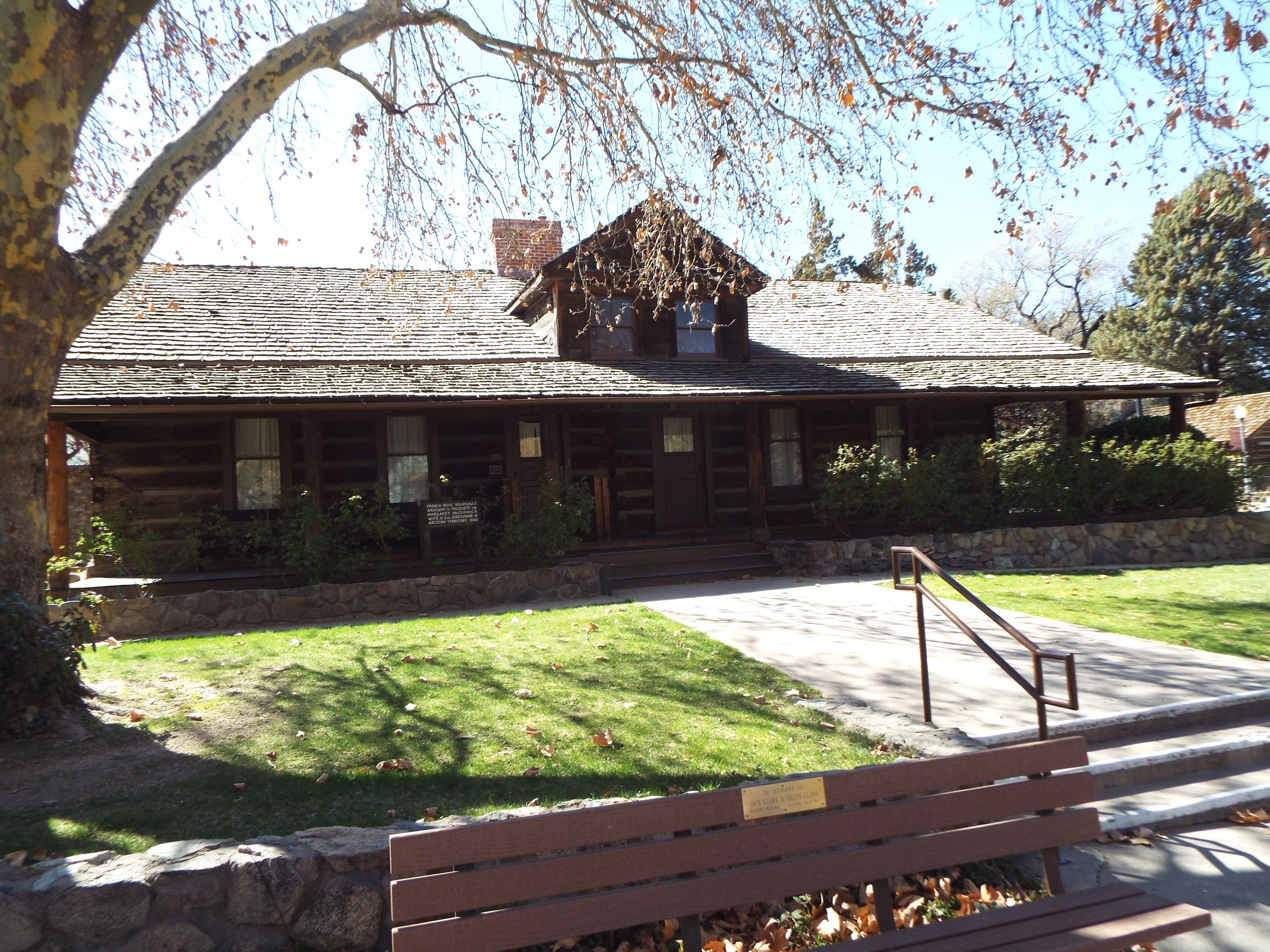
Old Governor's Mansion

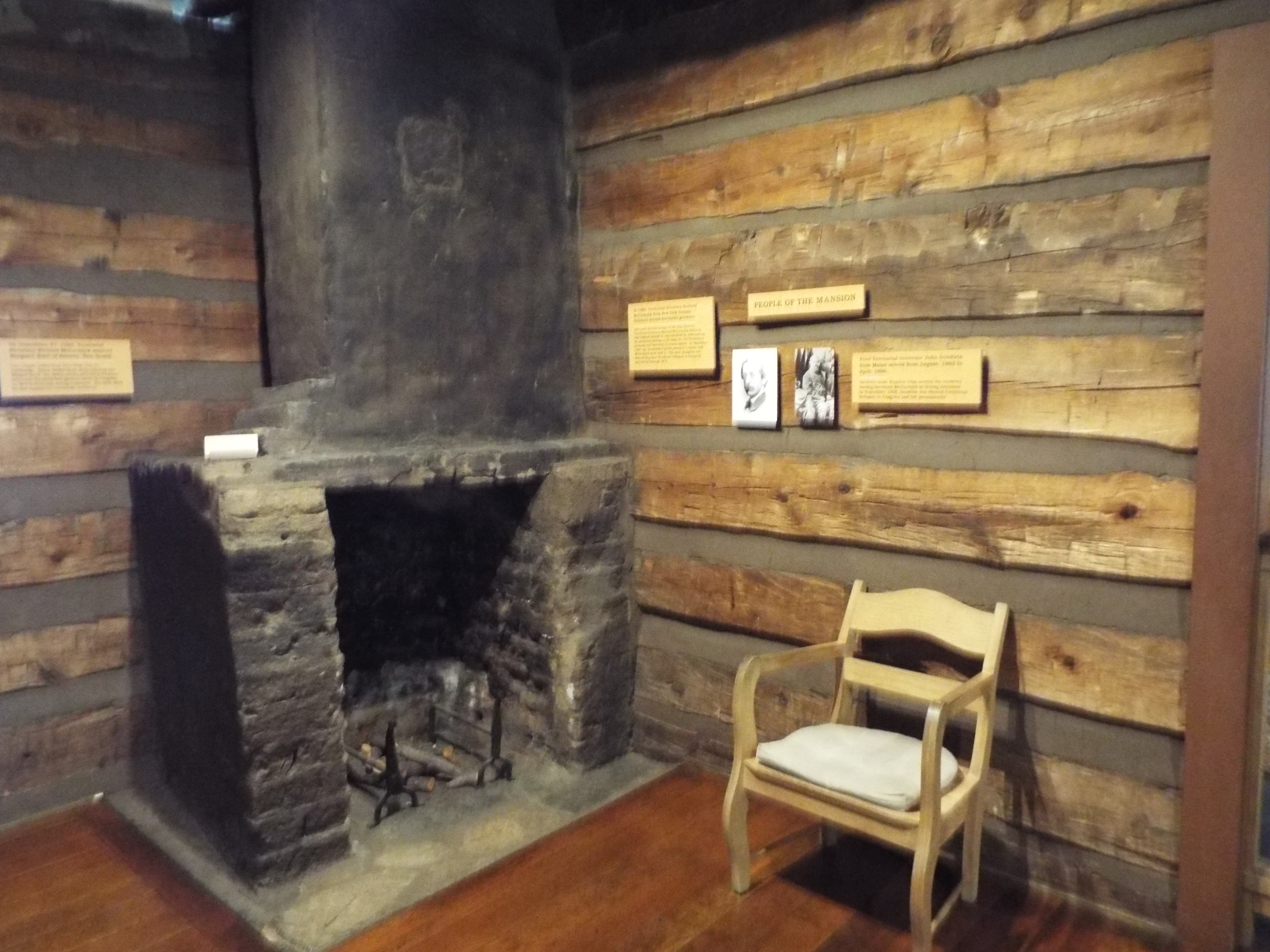
Inside the "Old Governor's Mansion"

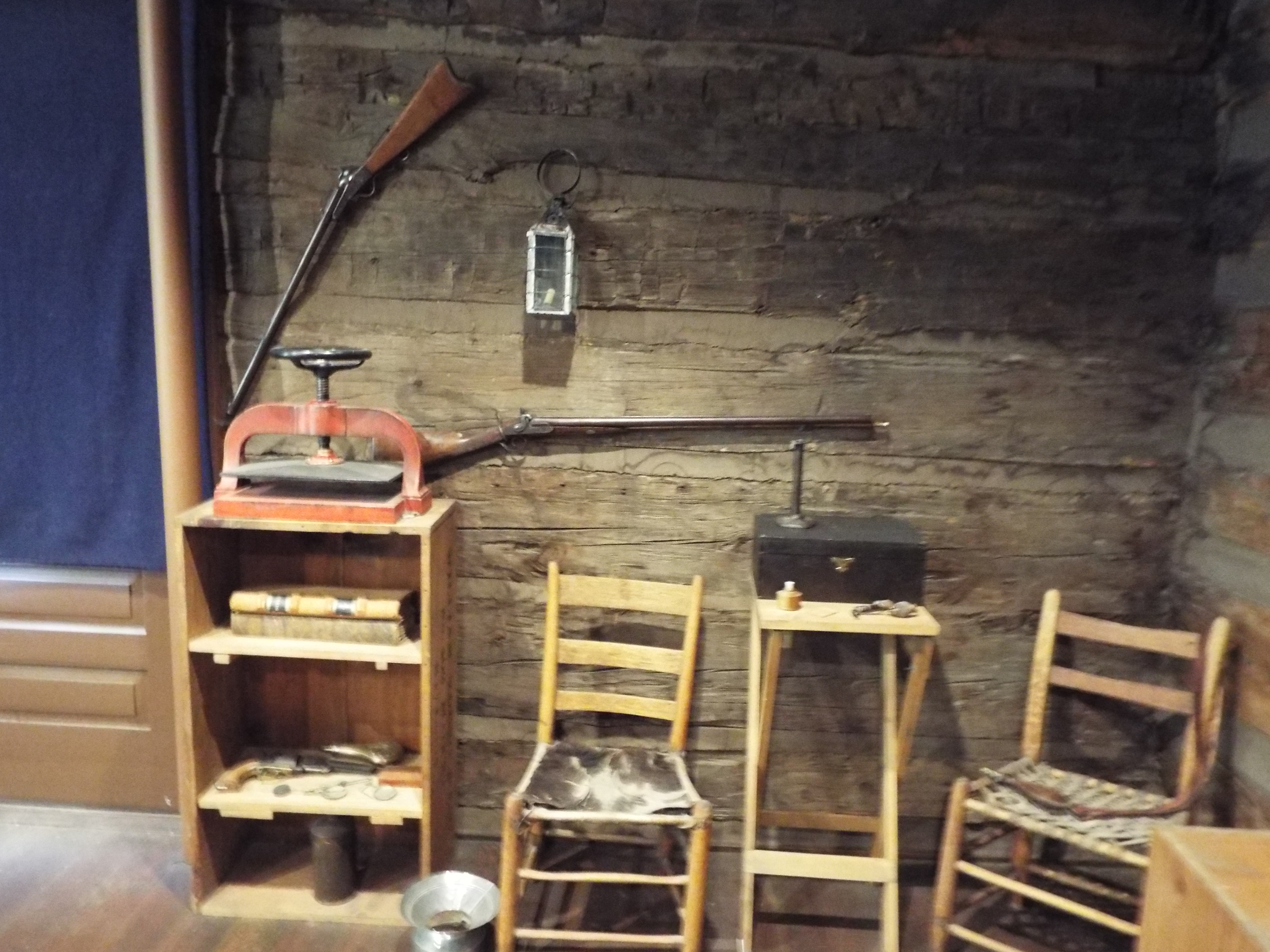
Inside another room of the "Old Governor's Mansion"

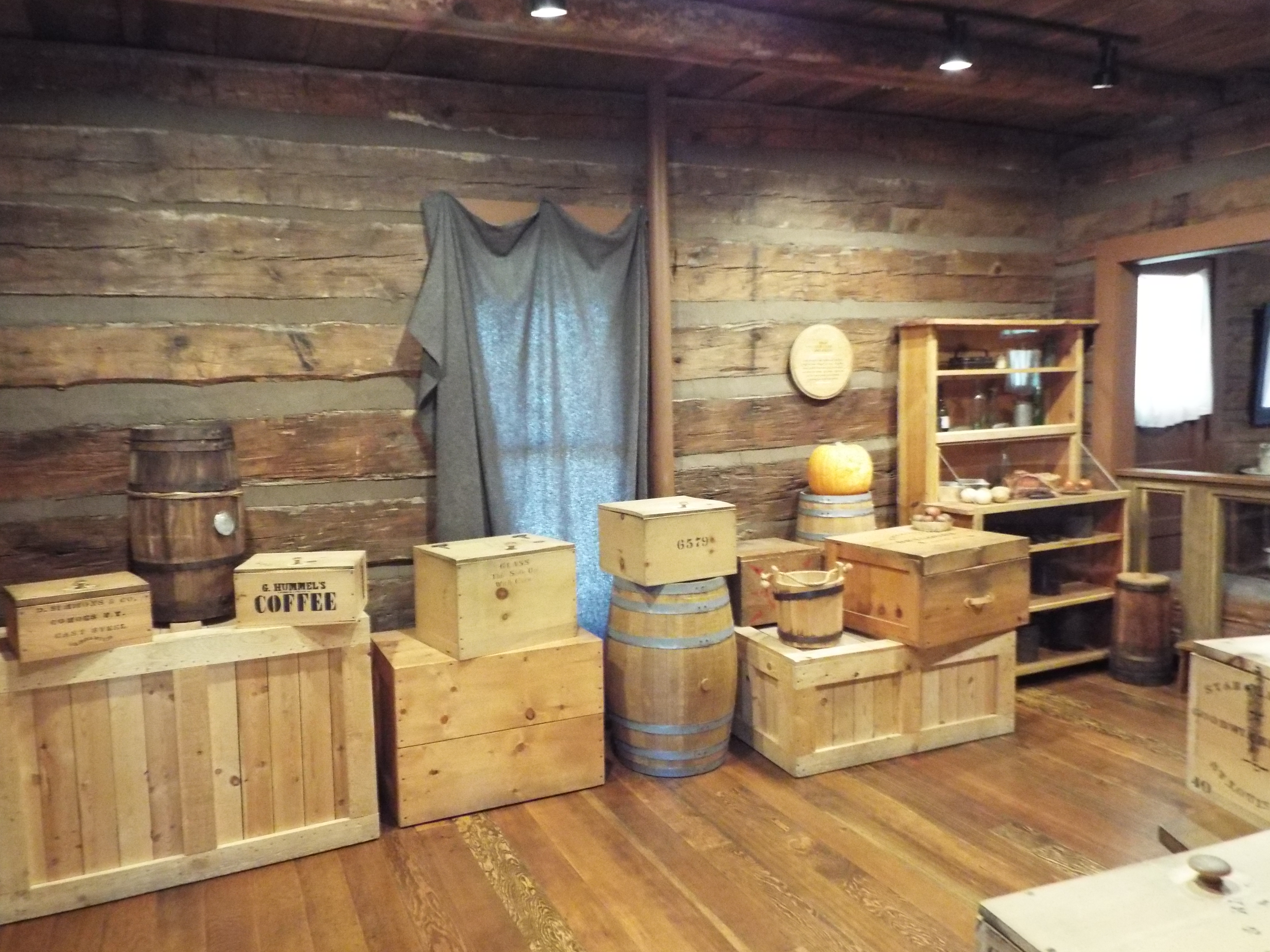
Inside the "Old Governor's Mansion"

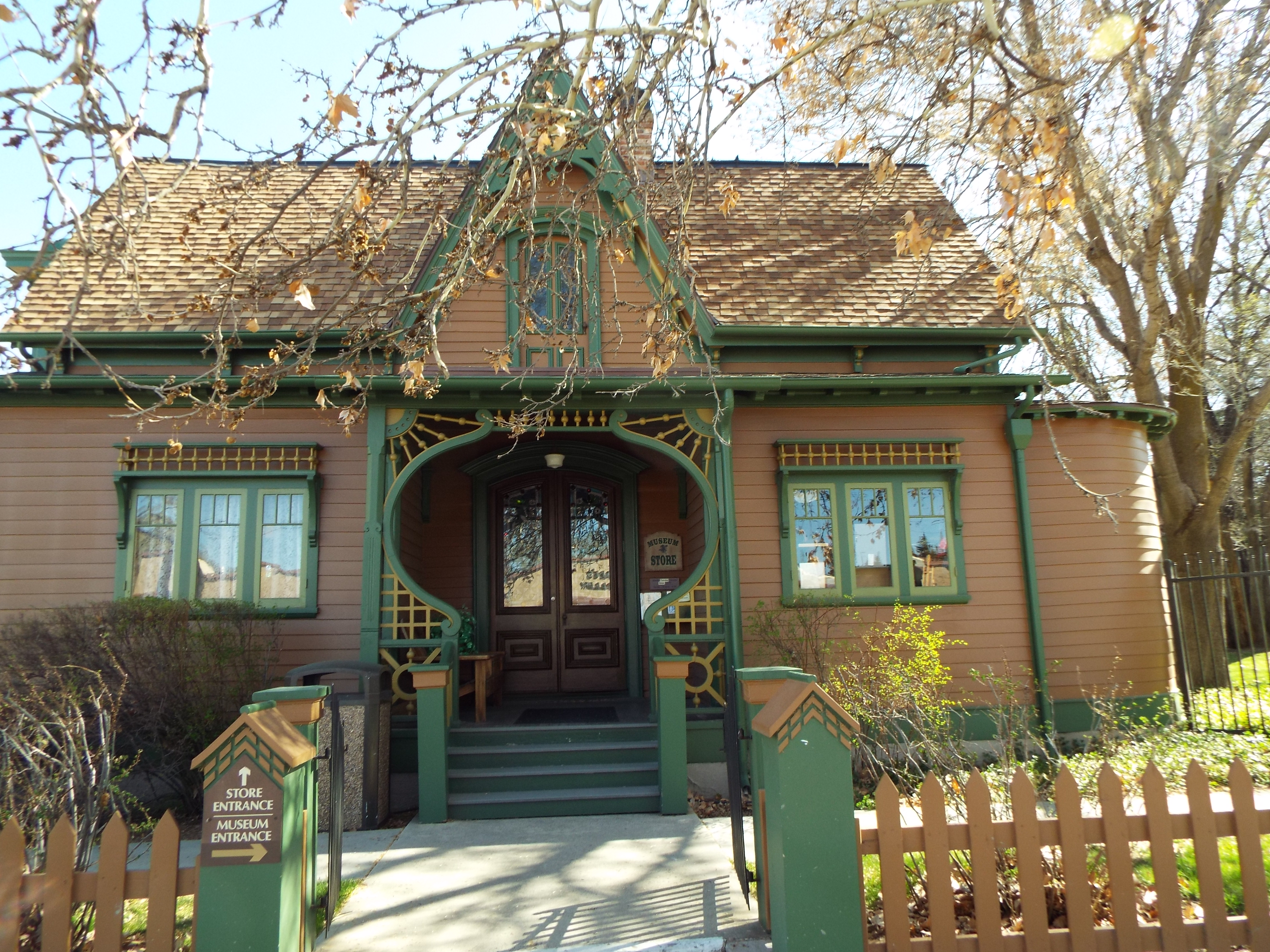
The William C. Bashford House

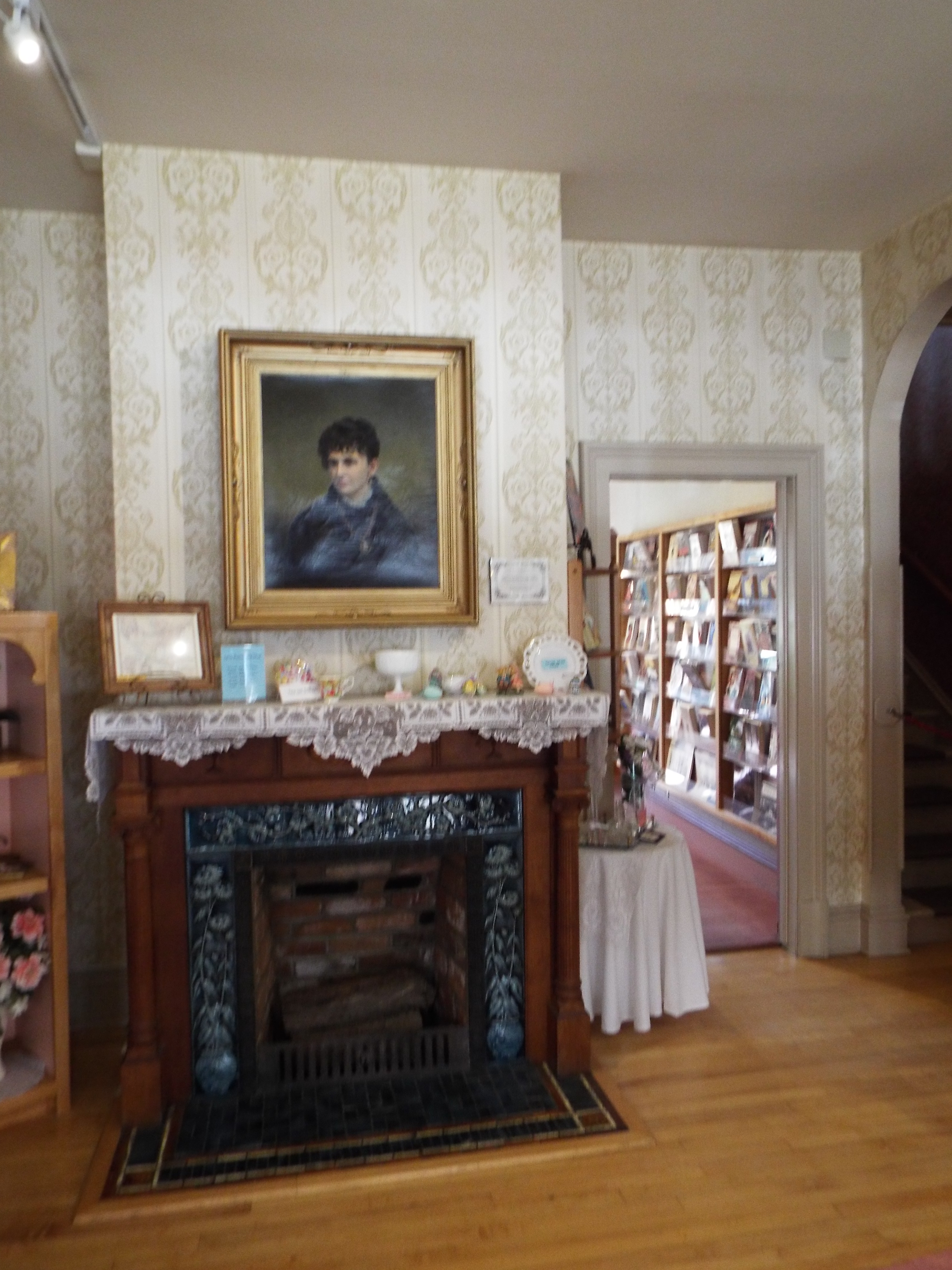
Inside the Bashford House

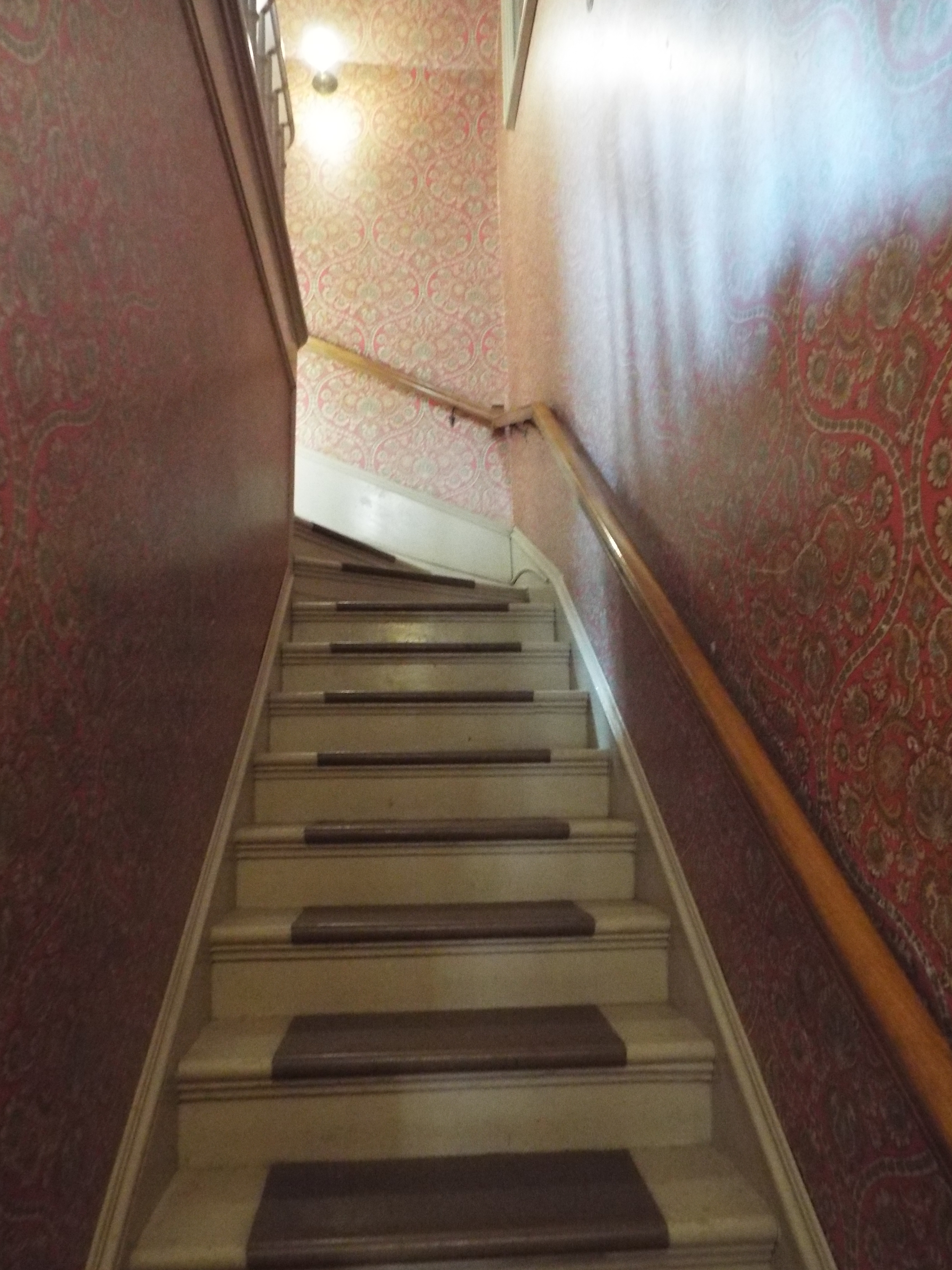
The Bashford House staircase.

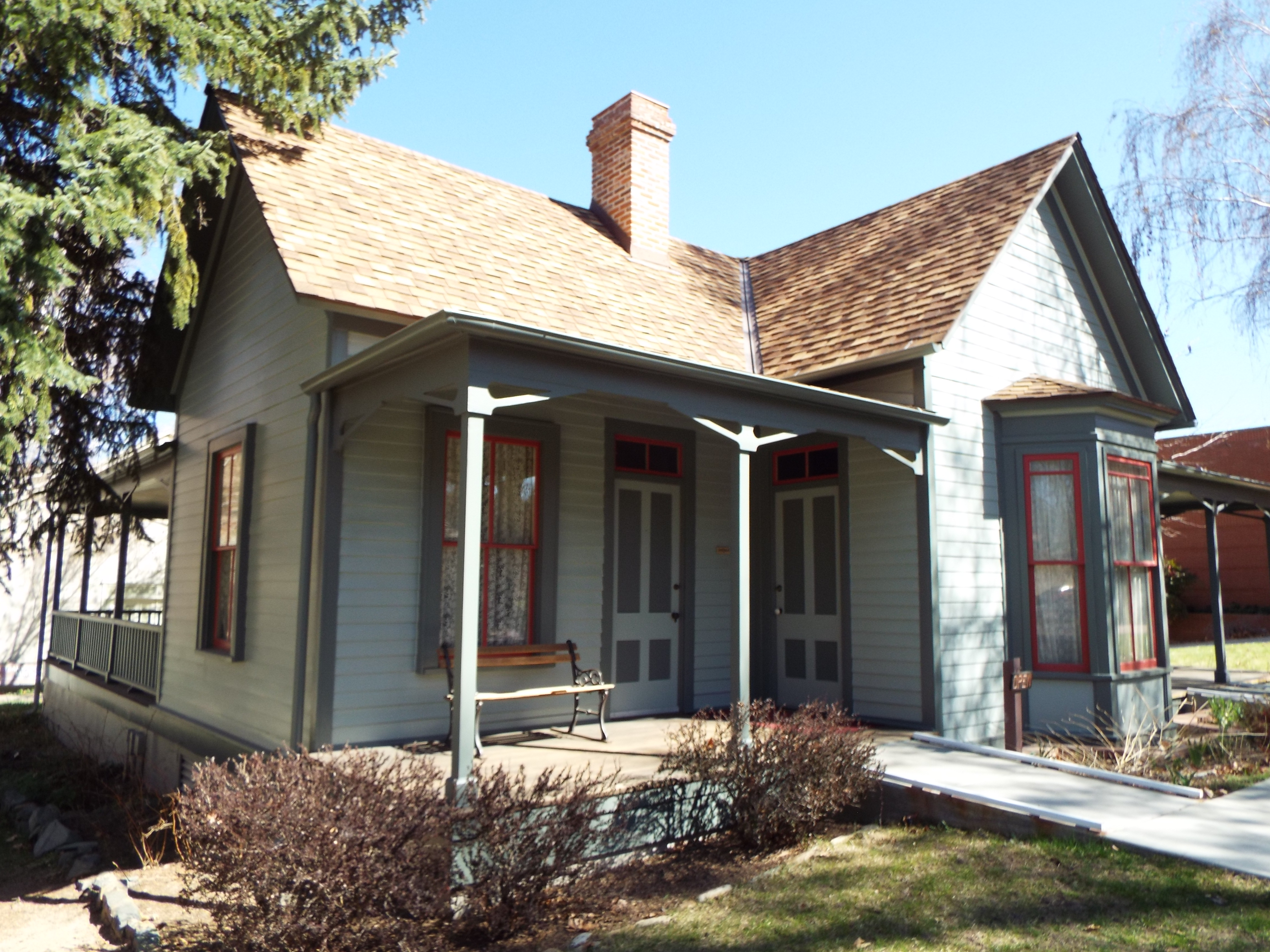
The John Charles Frémont House

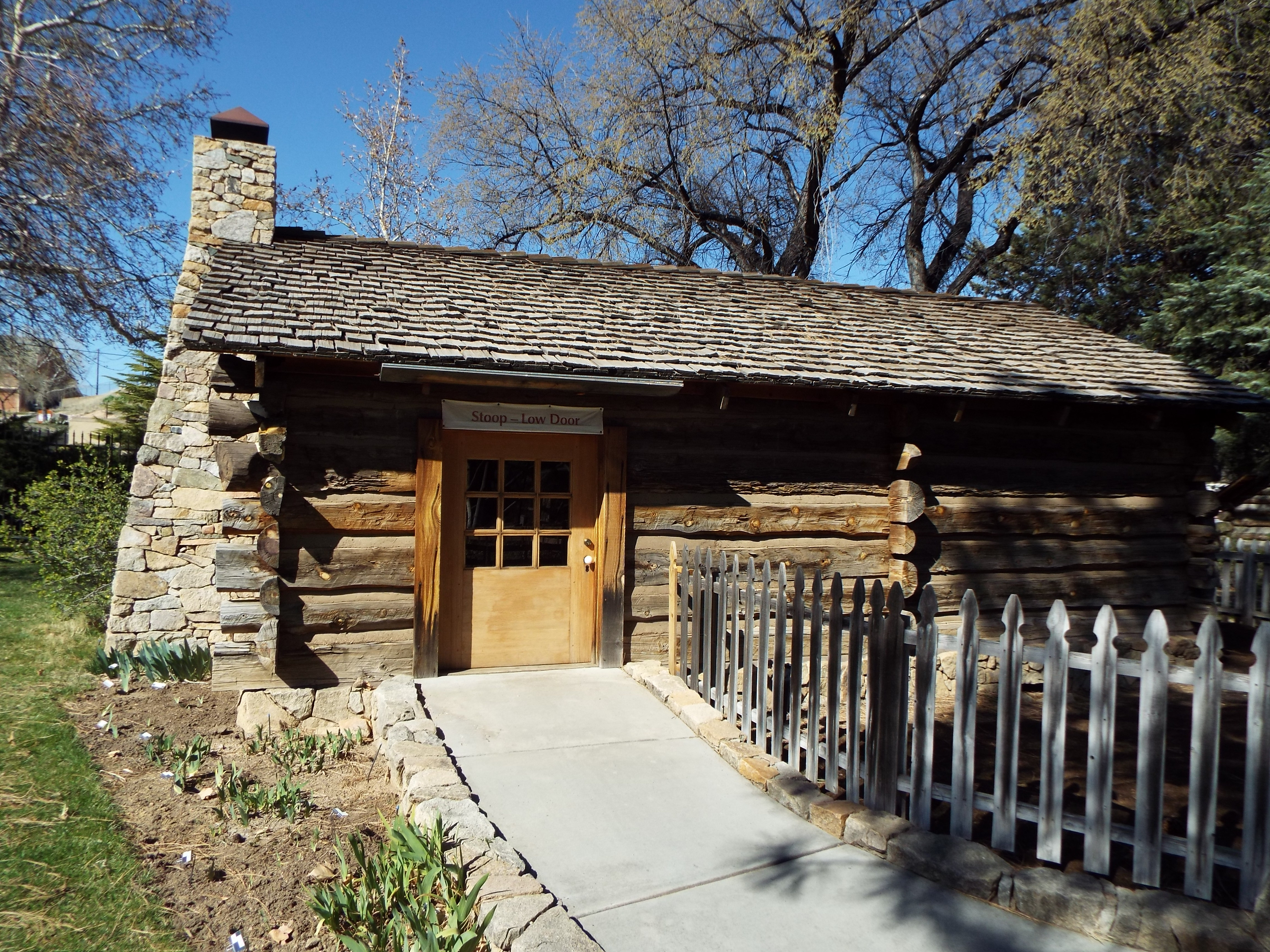
Fort Misery Log Cabin

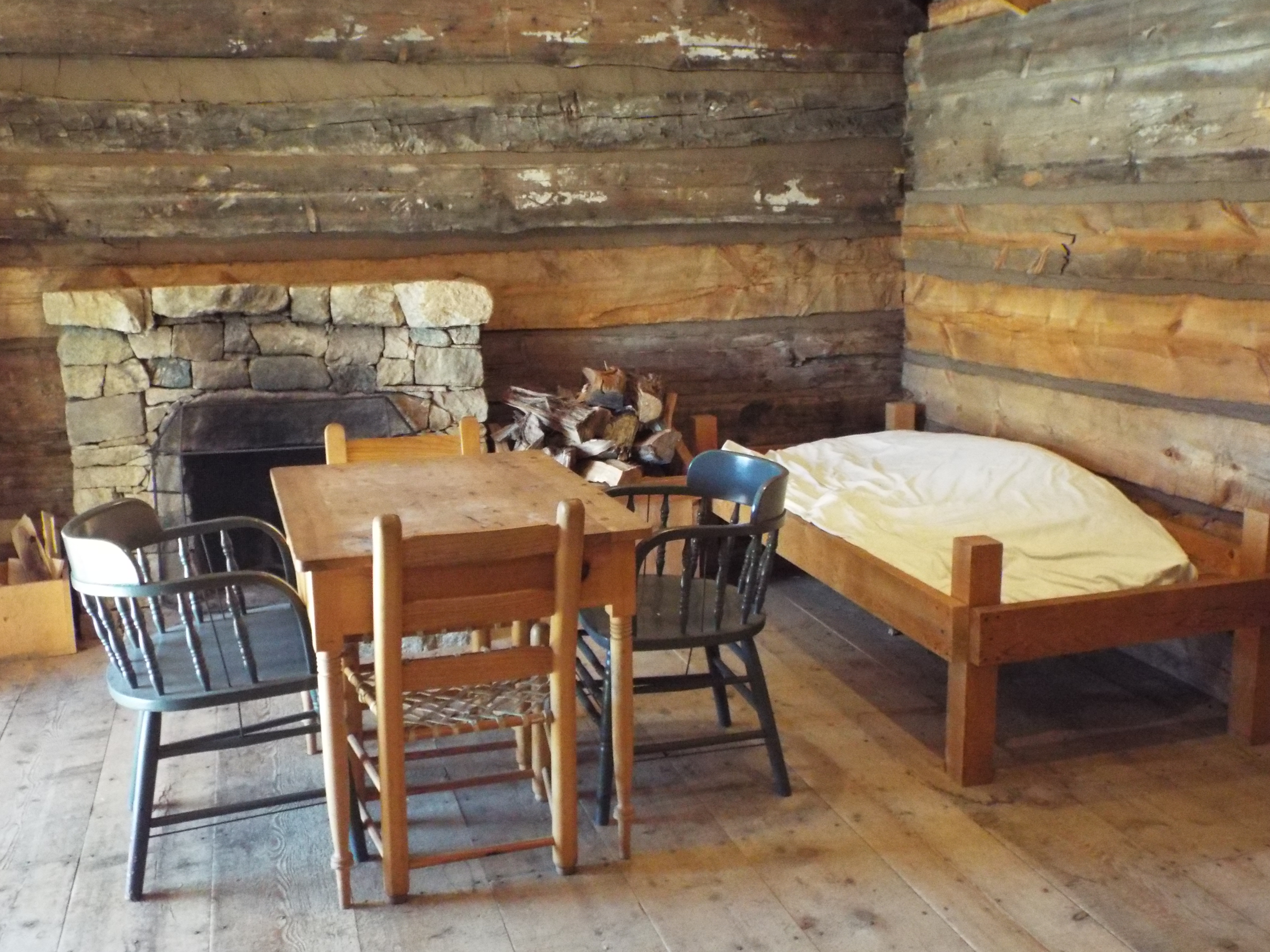
Inside the Fort Misery Log Cabin

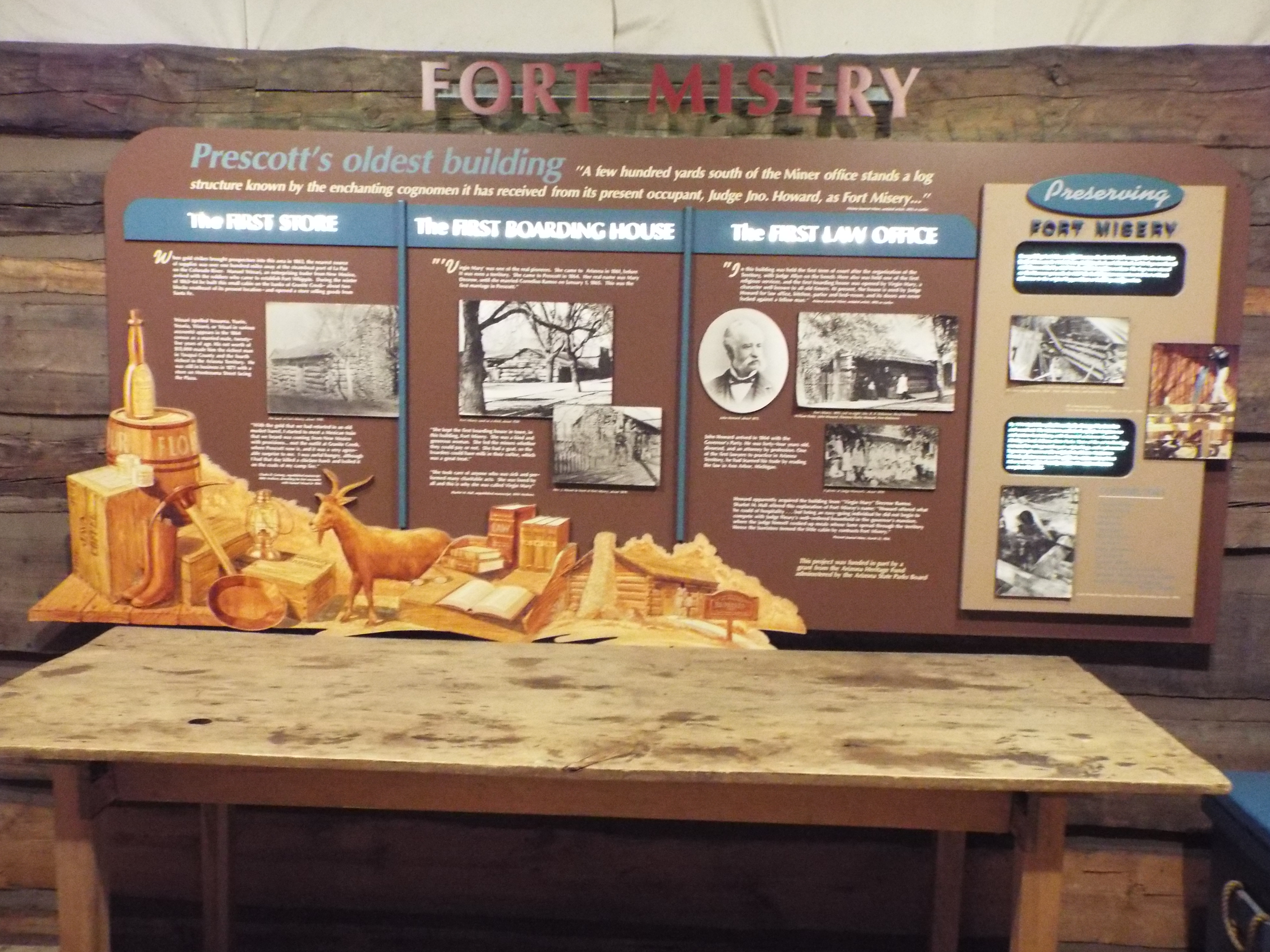
Different room in the Fort Misery Log Cabin

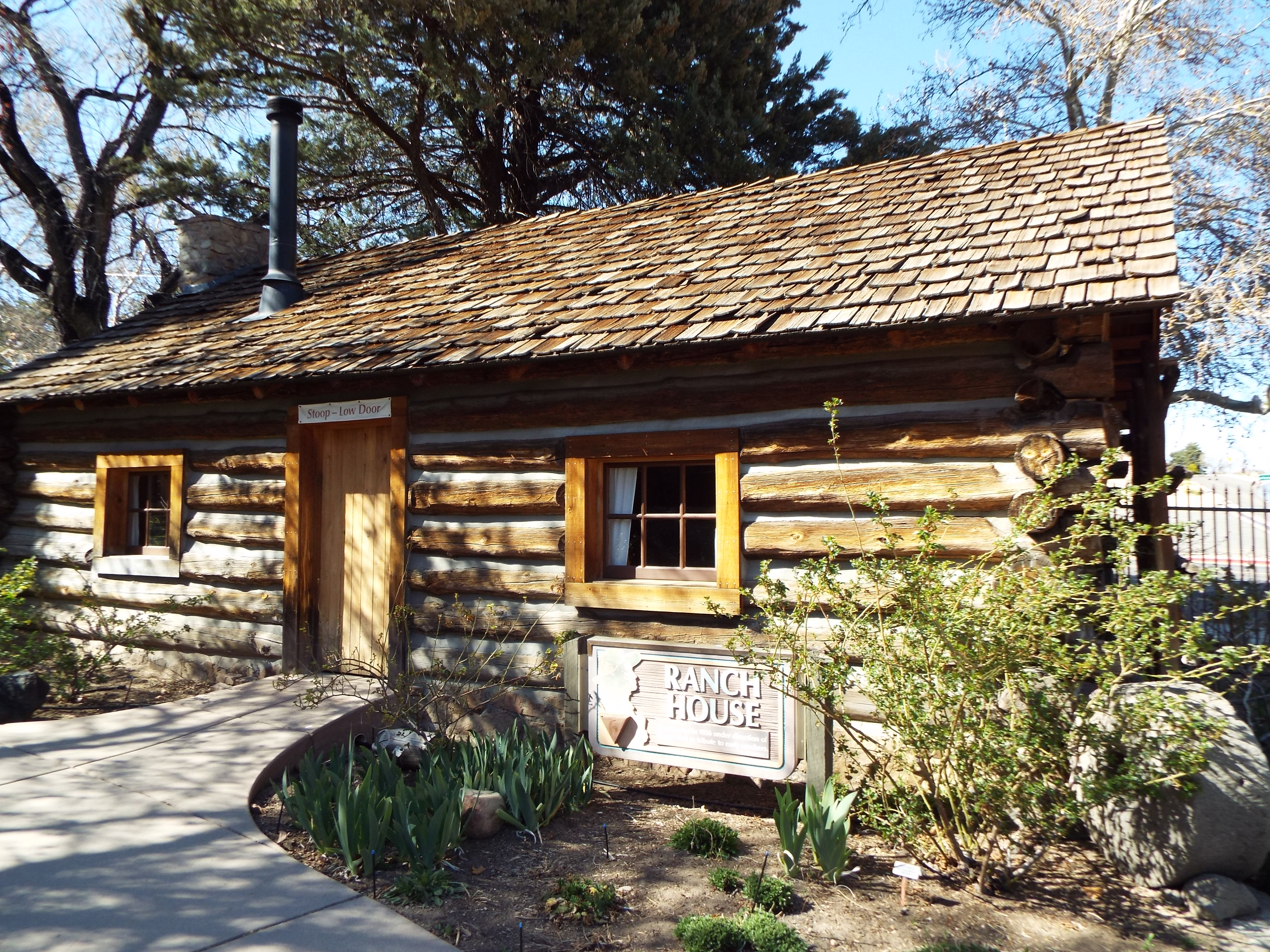
Ranch House

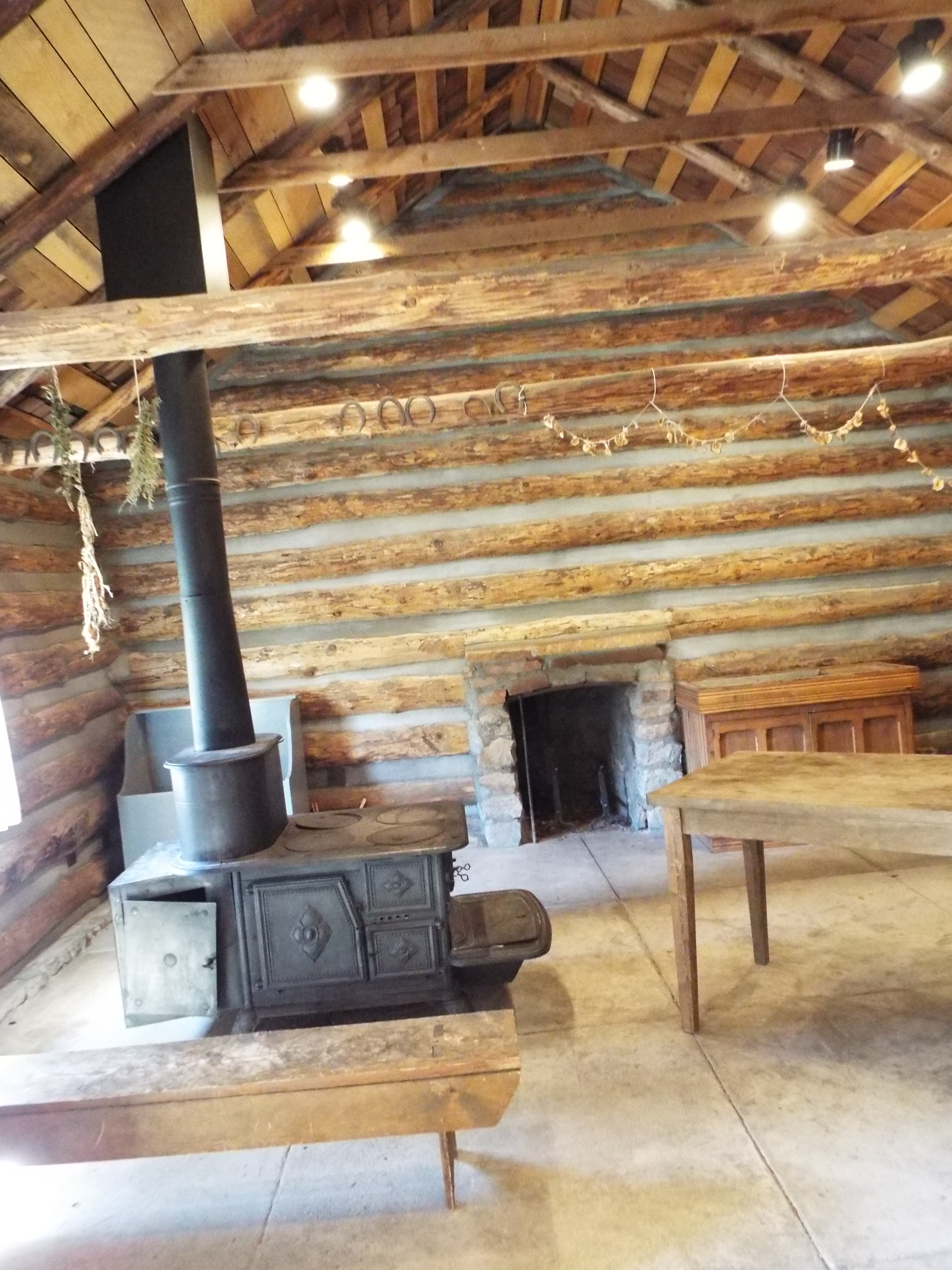
Inside the Ranch House

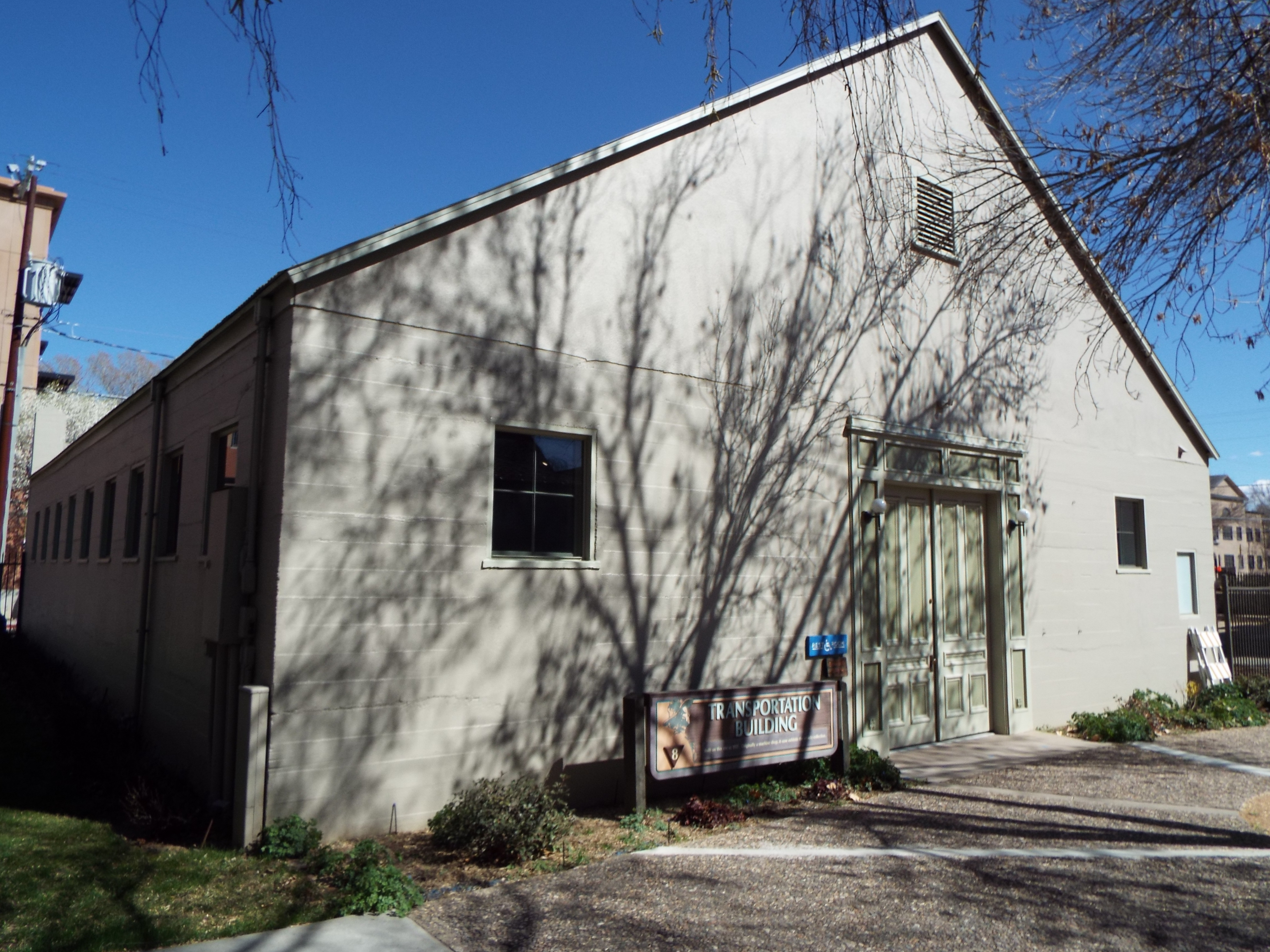
The Transportation Building

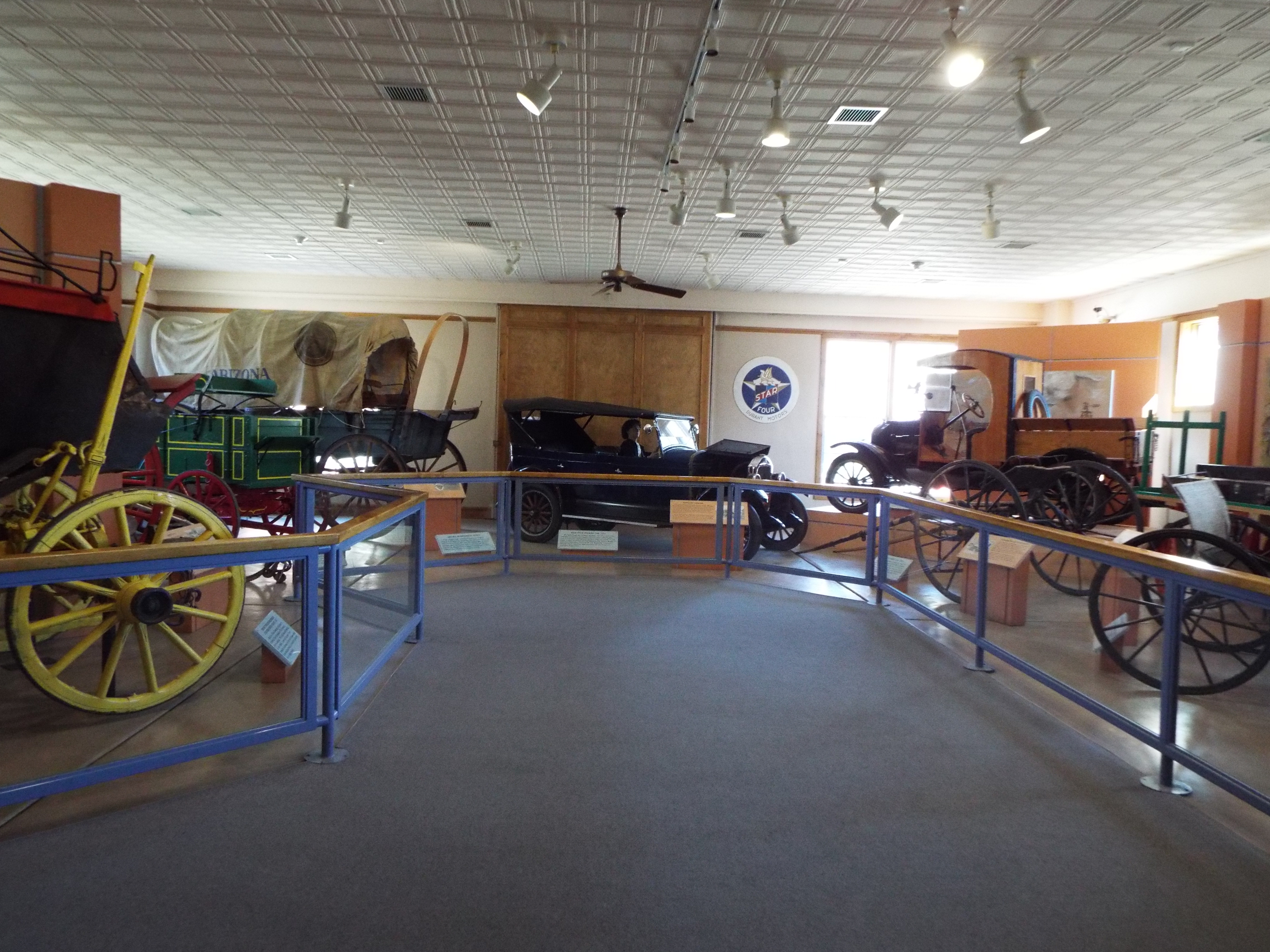
Exhibits inside the Transportation Building

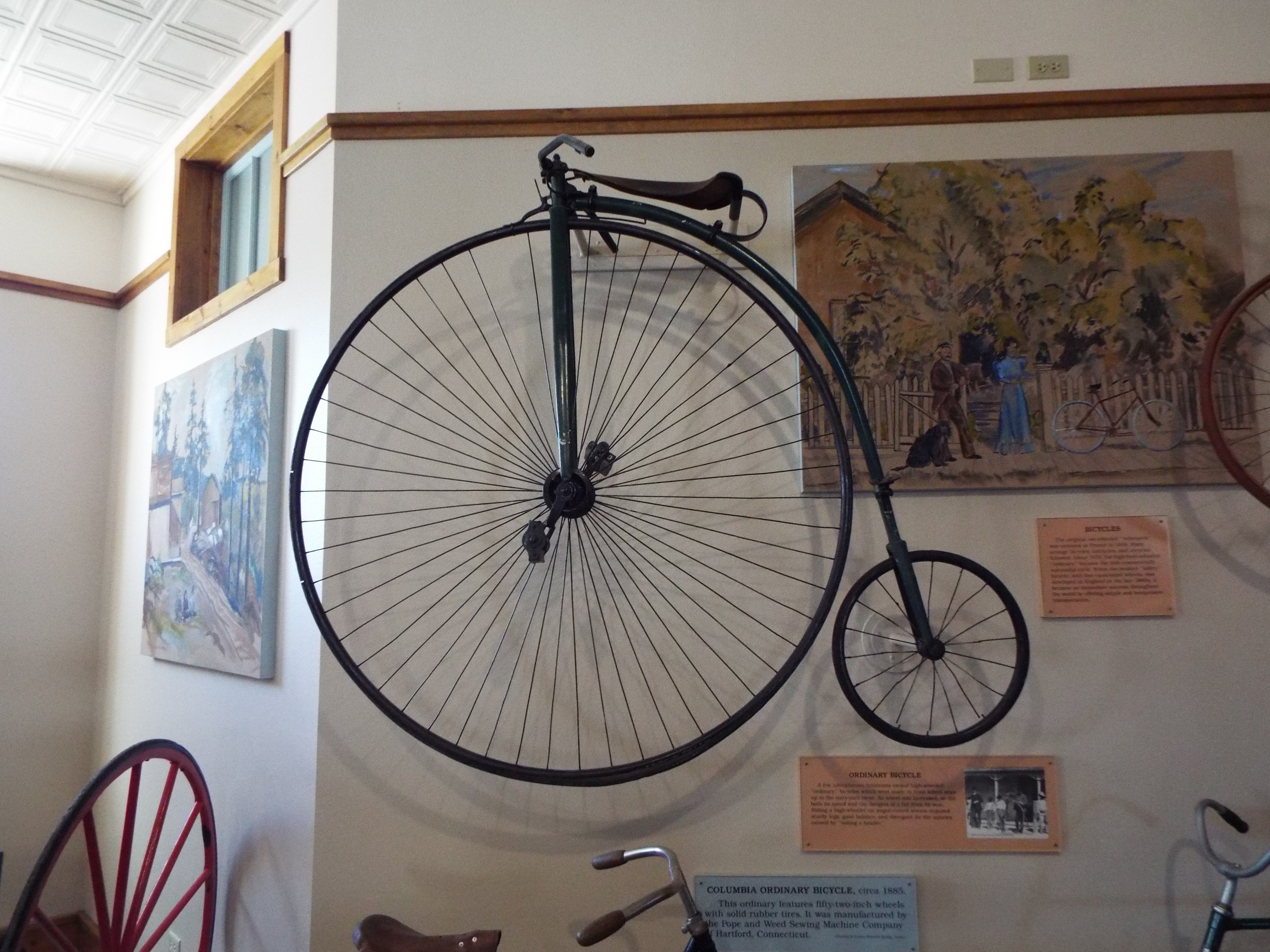
A 1937 Columbia Ordinary Bicycle on exhibit.

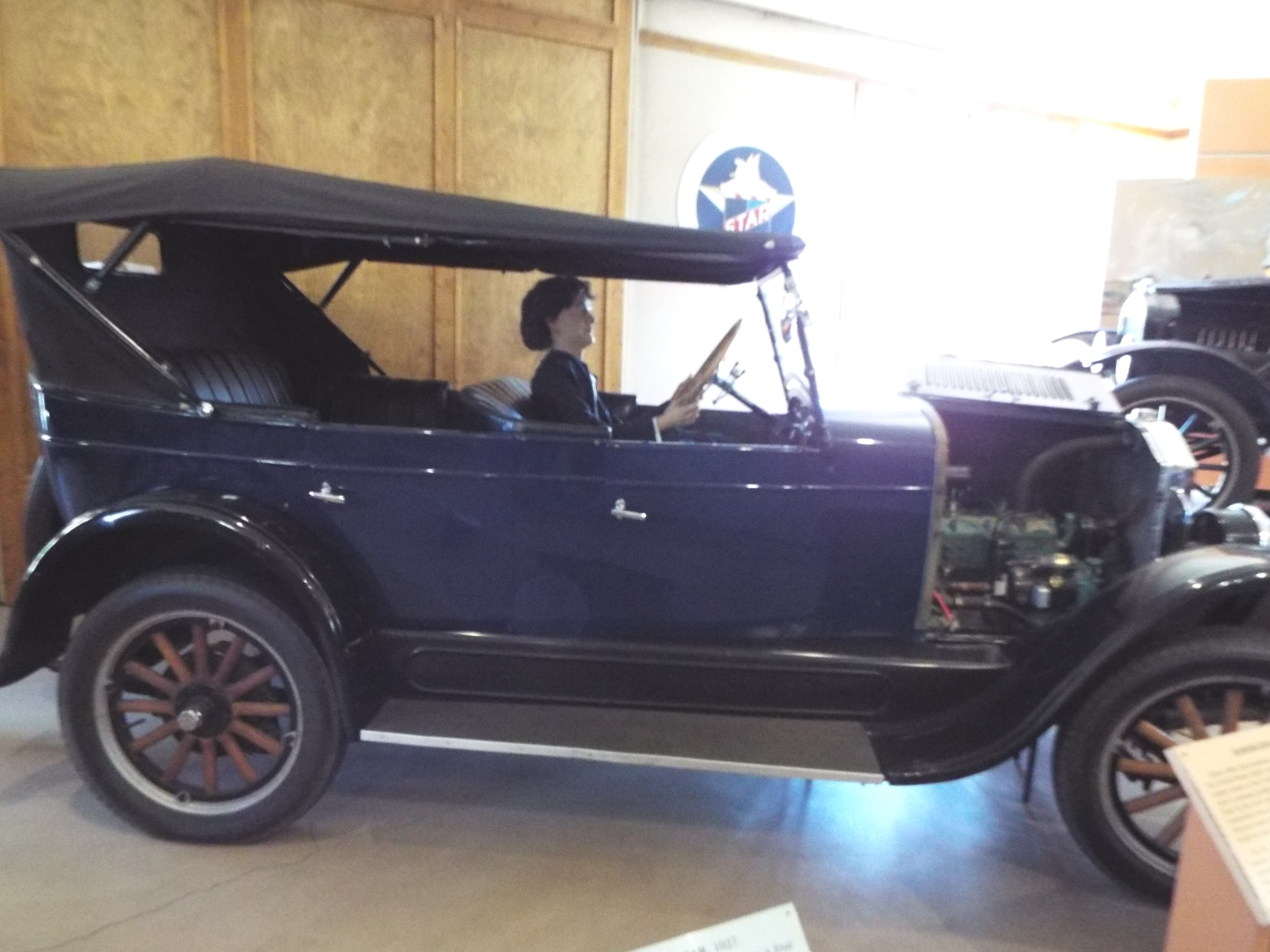
Sharlot Hall's 1927 Durant Star Touring Car on exhibit.

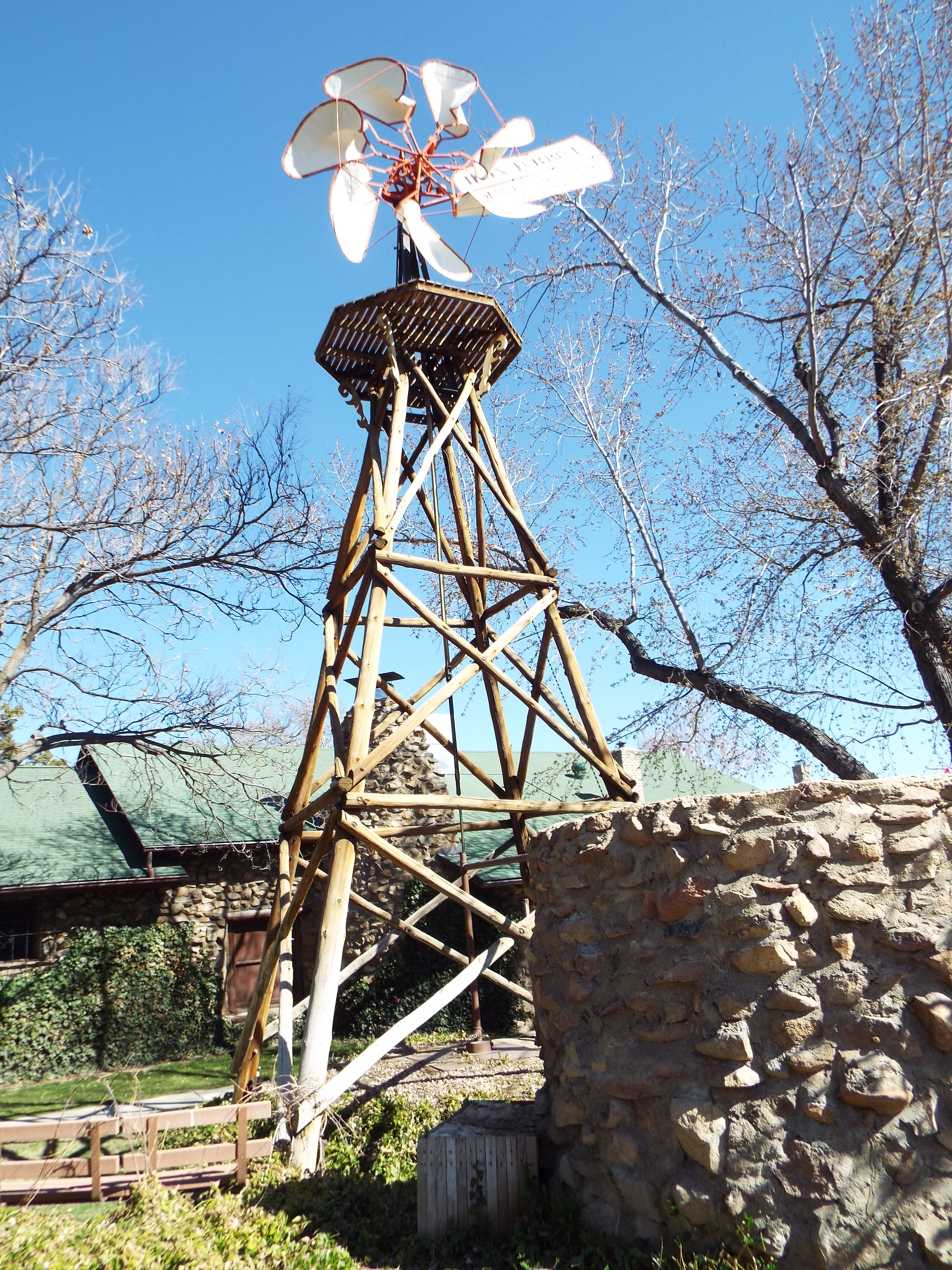
Iron Turbine Windmill.

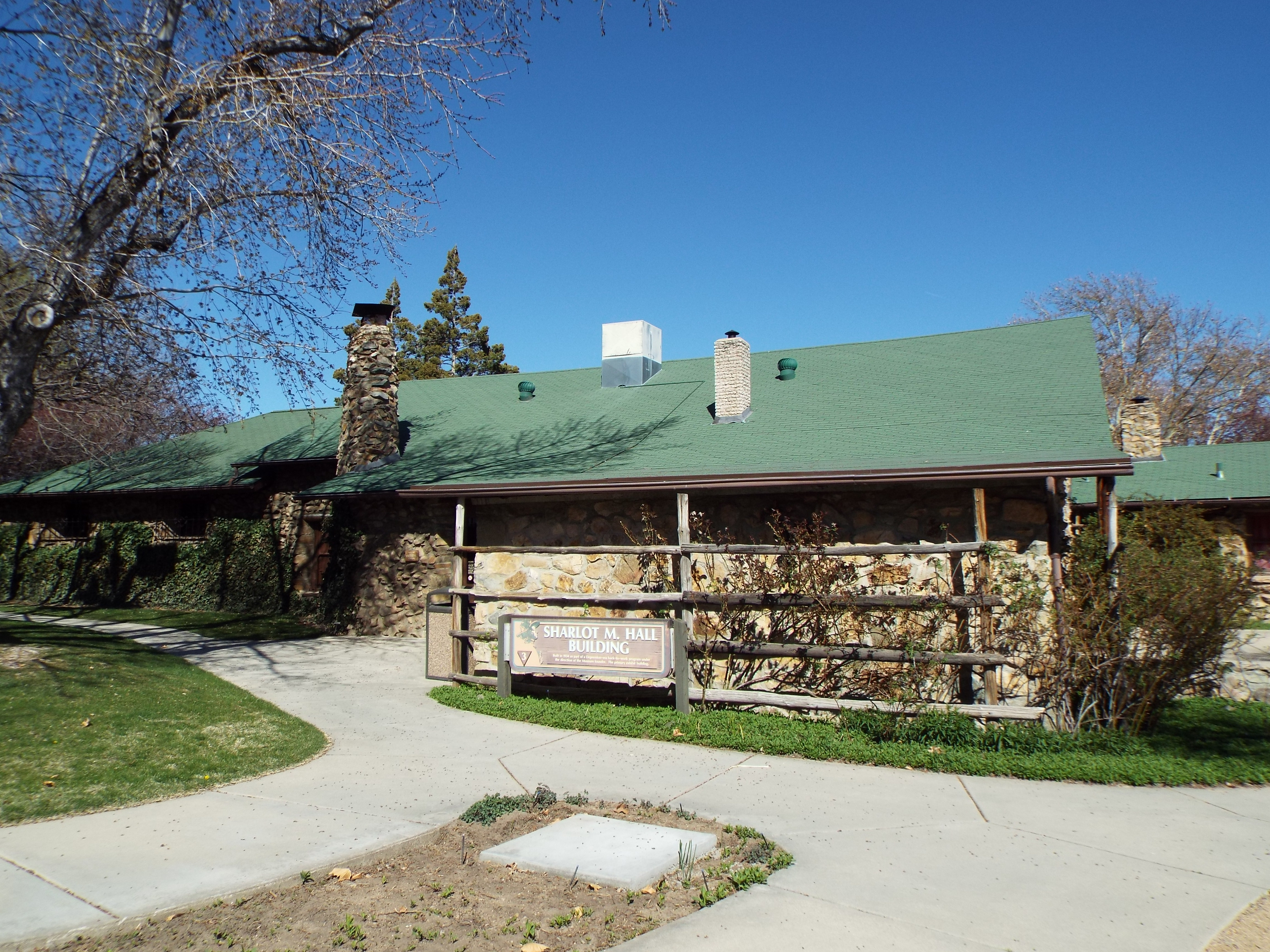
The Sharlot M. Hall Building which also served as her residence.

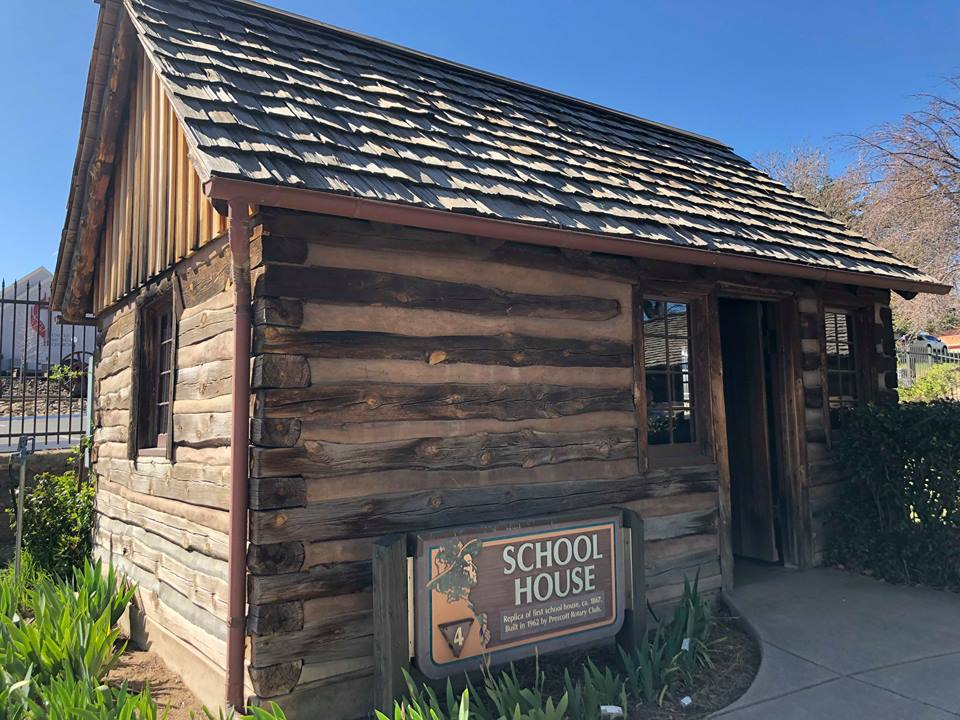
Replica of Prescott's first 1872 community schoolhouse.

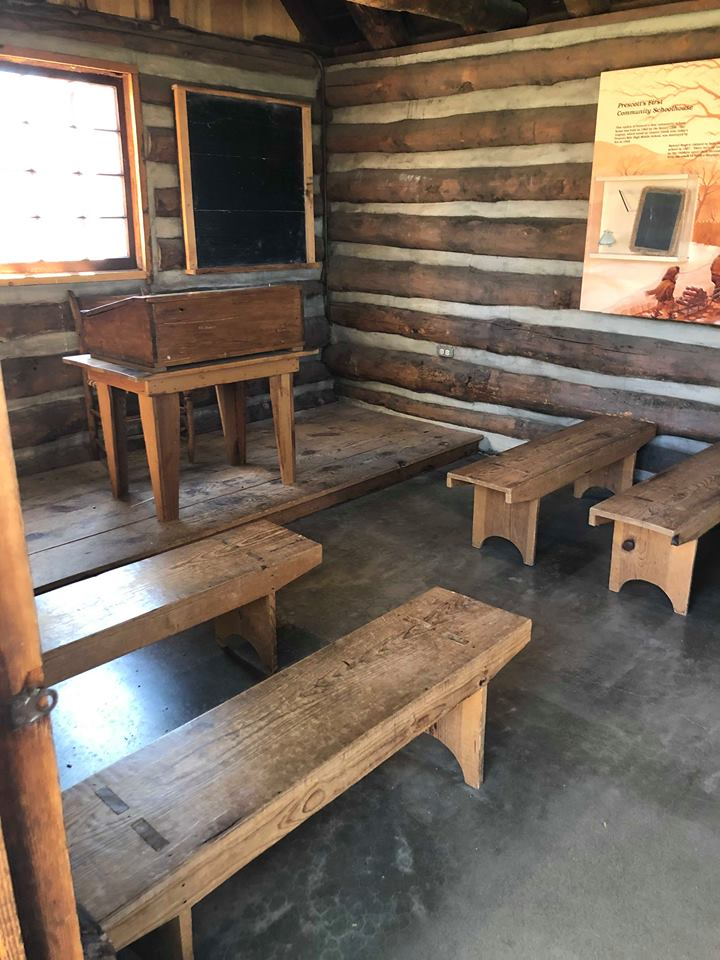
Inside the replica of Prescott's first community schoolhouse.

== Arizona Pioneer Home Cemetery ==
The Arizona Pioneers’ Home Cemetery was established in 1911. It was built upon an older private cemetery which was established in 1864. The location of the cemetery is on a hill on 1300 W. Iron Springs Road. Among the notable celebrities that are buried there are the following:

- Mary Katherine Horony-Cummings – (1849–1940), a.k.a. Big Nose Kate. She was a Hungarian born prostitute and longtime companion and common-law wife of Old West gunfighter Doc Holliday.
- Kate Thompson Cory – (1861–1958) was an American photographer and artist who lived among the Hopi for several years, recording their lives in photographs.
- Sharlot Mabridth Hall – (1870–1943) was the first woman to hold an office in the Arizona Territorial government. Her personal collection of photographs and artifacts served as the starting collection for the history museum which bears her name.
Historic Arizona Pioneer Home Cemetery

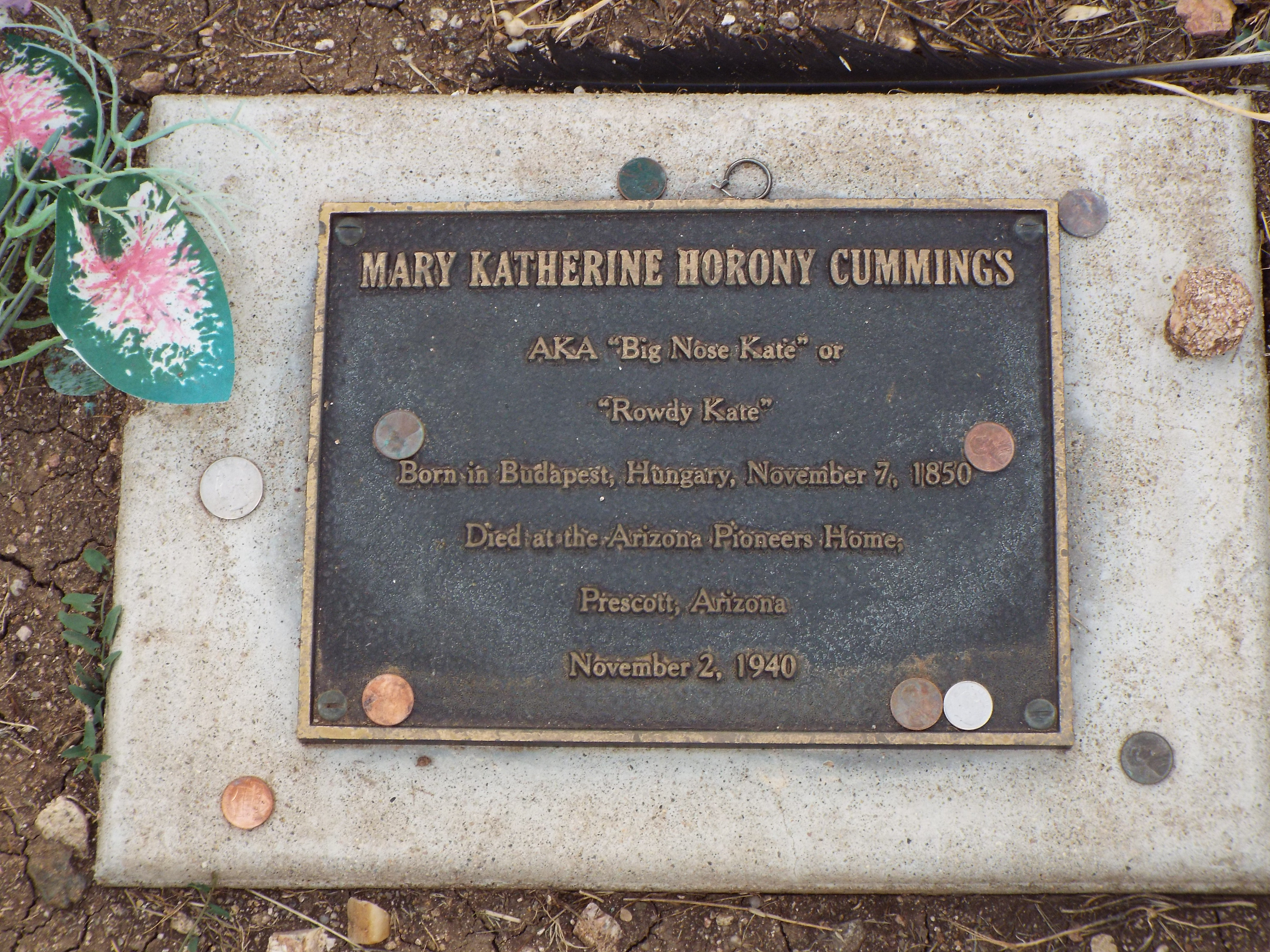
Big Nose Kate's Grave Marker

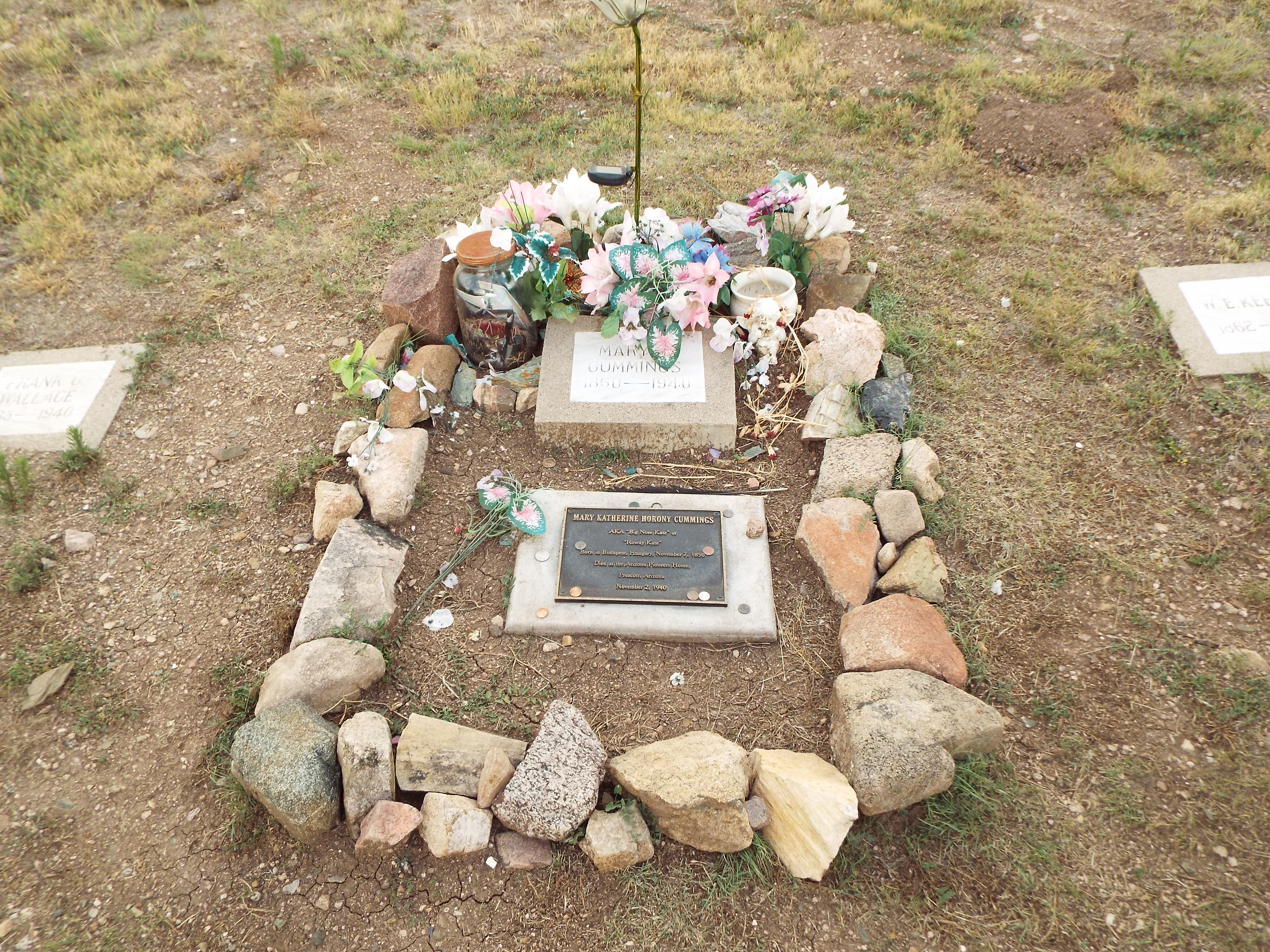
Grave-site of Big Nose Kate

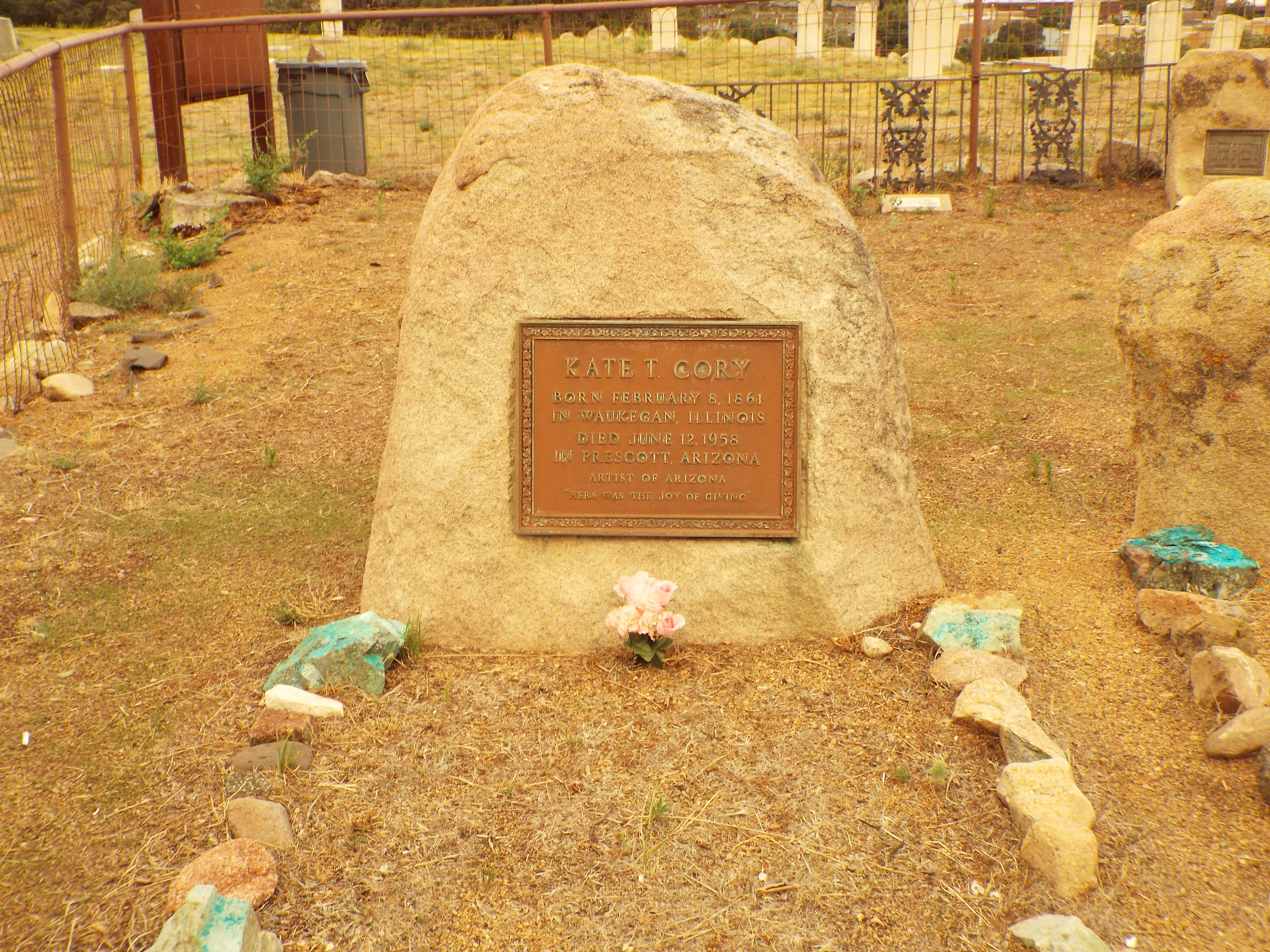
Grave-site of Kate T. Cory

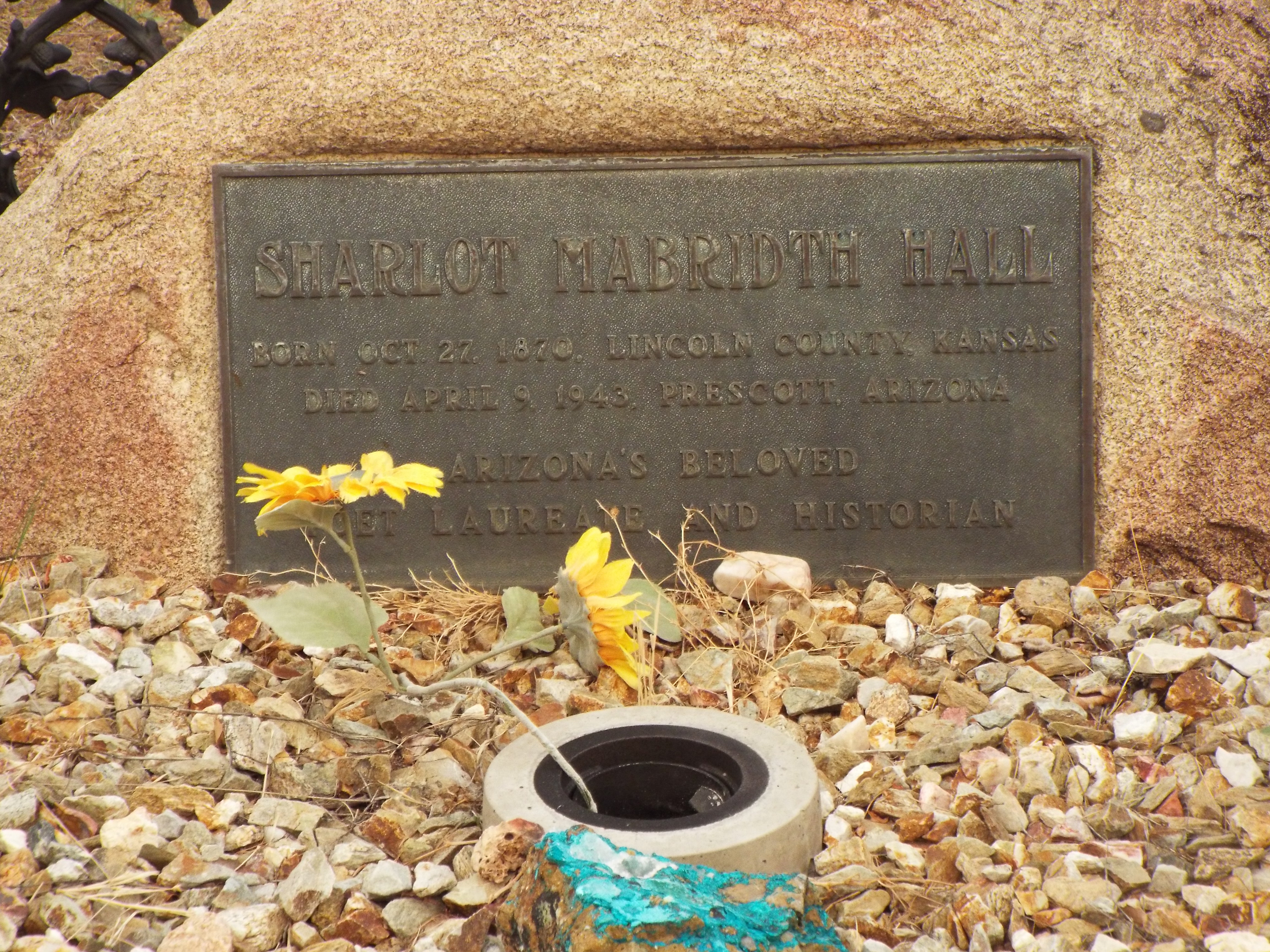
Sharlot Hall's Grave Marker

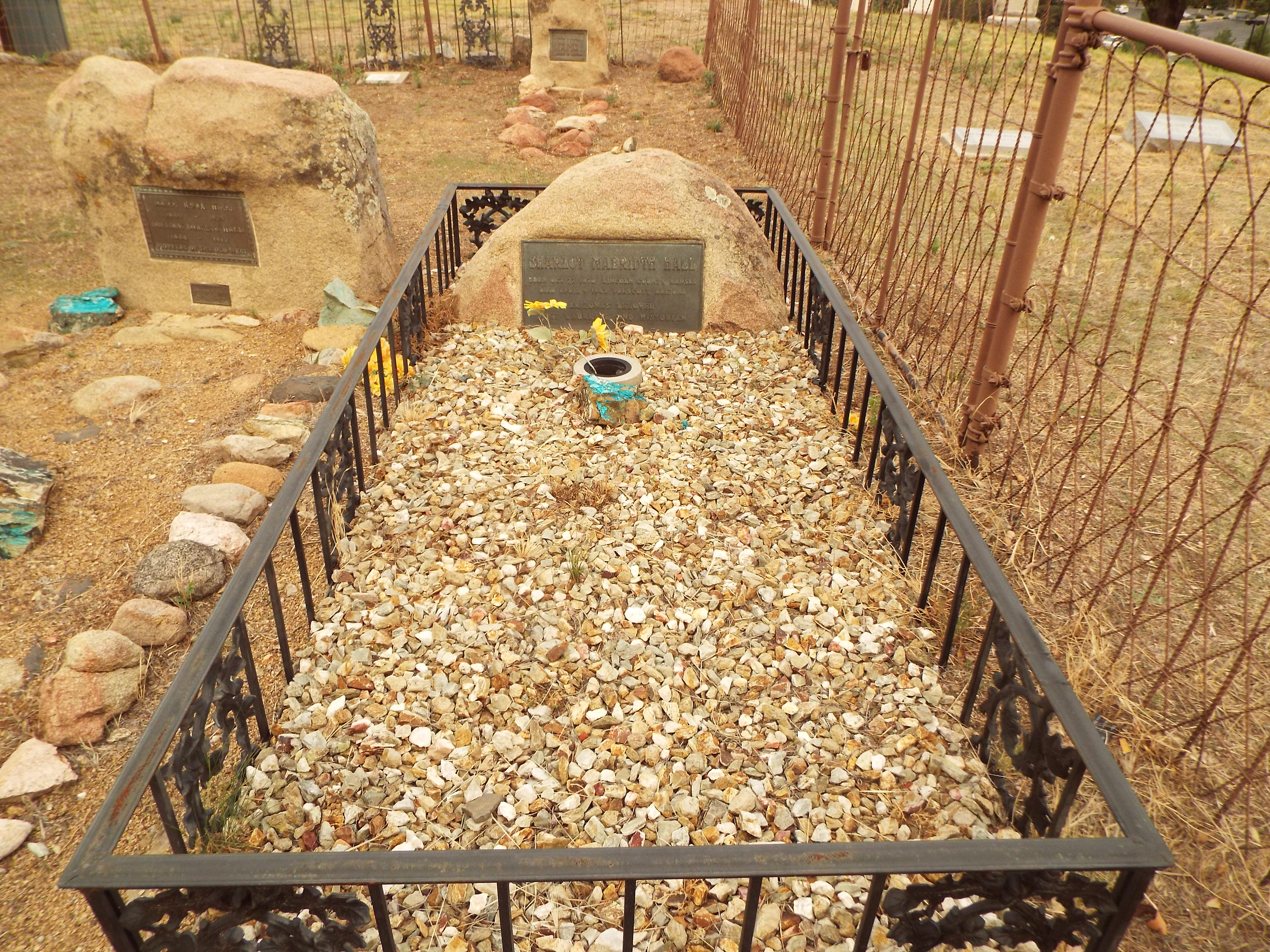
Grave-site of Sharlot Hall

== Fort Whipple ==
Fort Whipple was listed in the National Register of Historic Places on October 29, 1999, under the title "Fort Whipple-Department of Veterans Affairs Medical Center Historic District" reference #99001274. The 1872 structures still located in Fort Whipple which are pictured are the following:

- The Fort Whipple Museum, the former Commanding Officer's Quarters.
- The Fort Whipple NCO Quarters
- The Fort Whipple Army Barracks
- The Fort Whipple Post Headquarters
- The Fort Whipple Theater
- The Fort Whipple Guardhouse
Historic 1872 structures in Fort Whipple

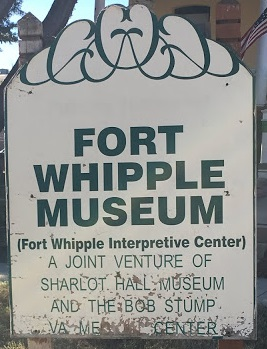
Fort Whipple Museum

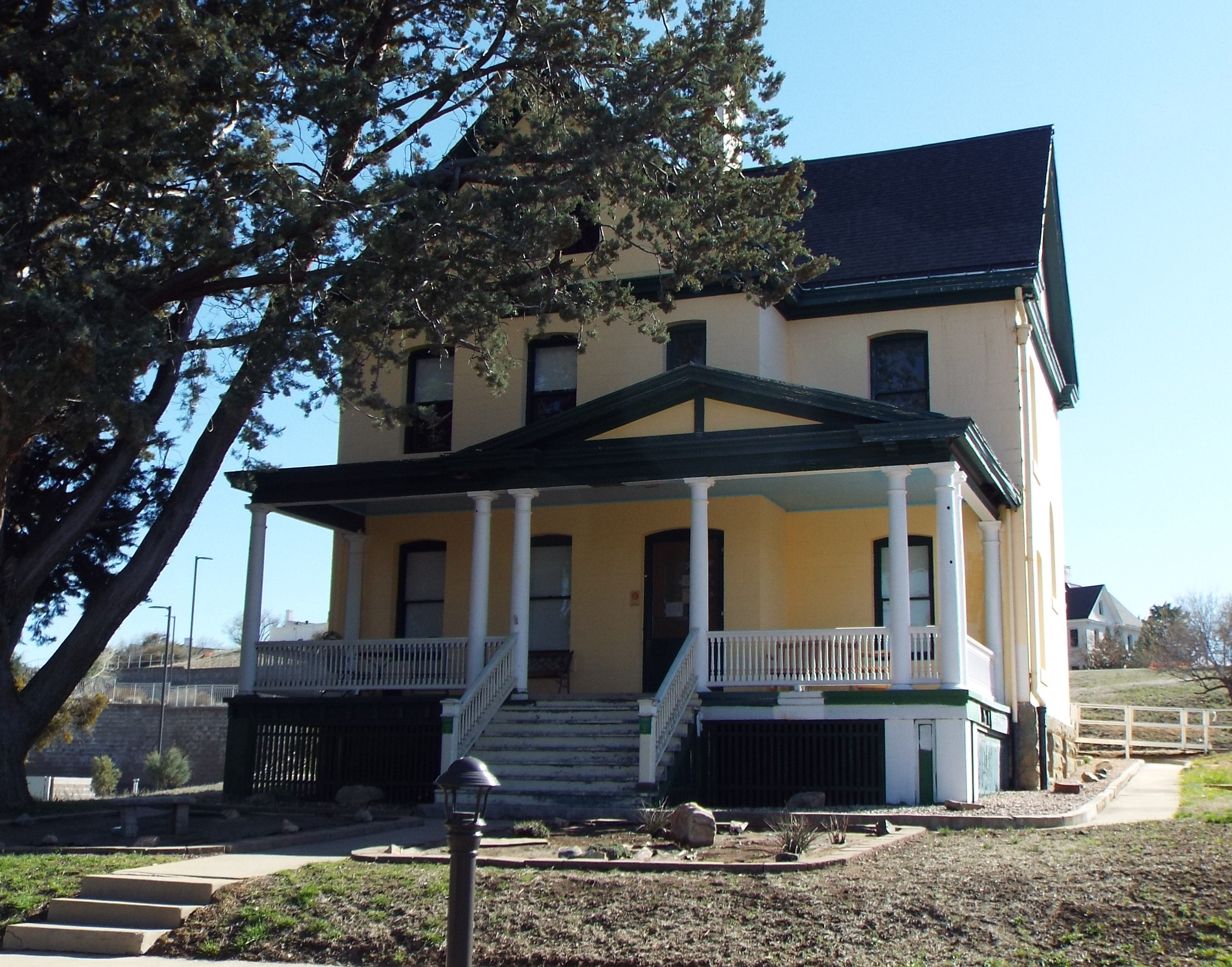
Fort Whipple Museum

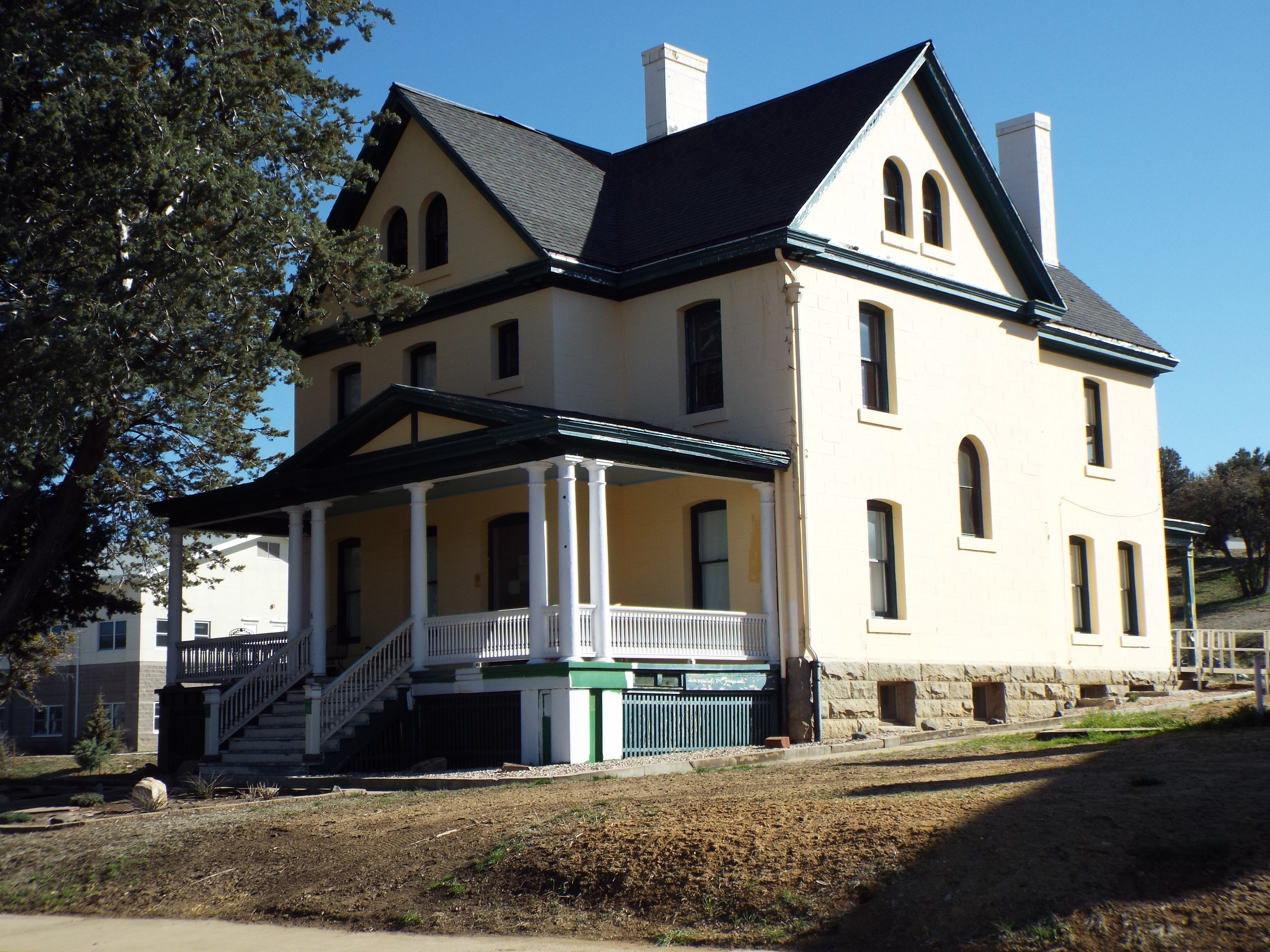
Fort Whipple Museum (Quarters-11)

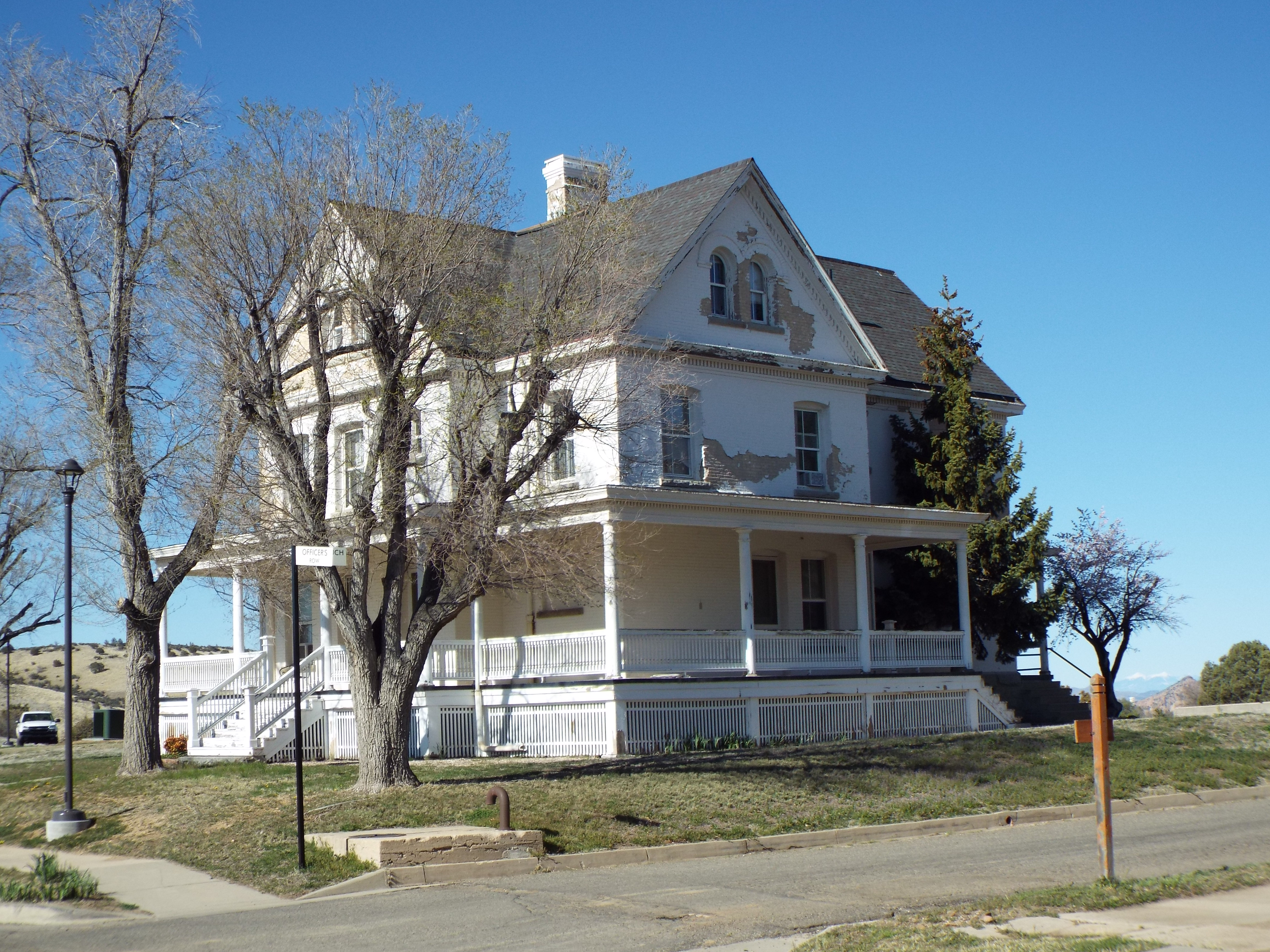
Fort Whipple Officers Quarters.

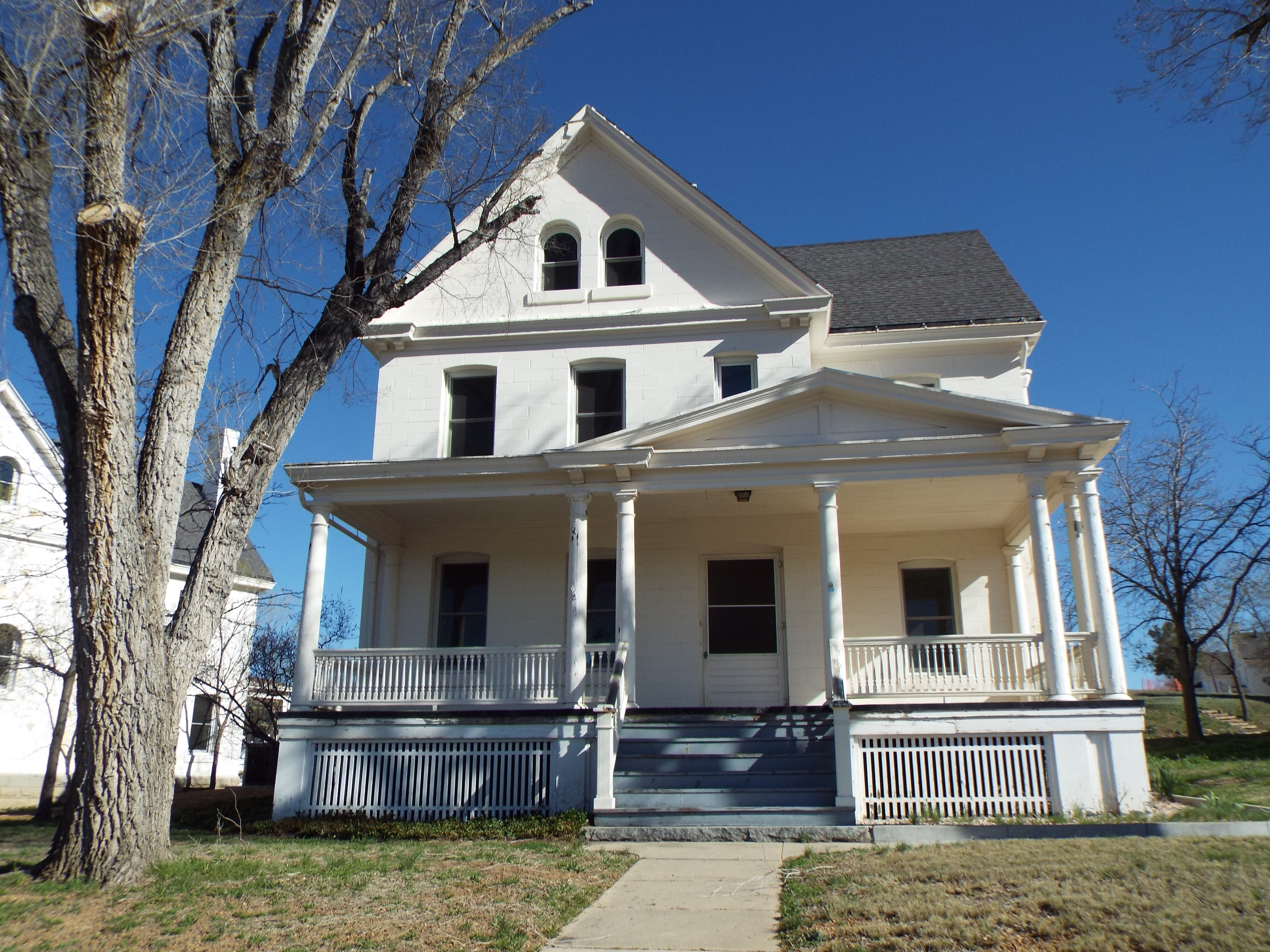
Fort Whipple Officers Quarters in Officer's Row

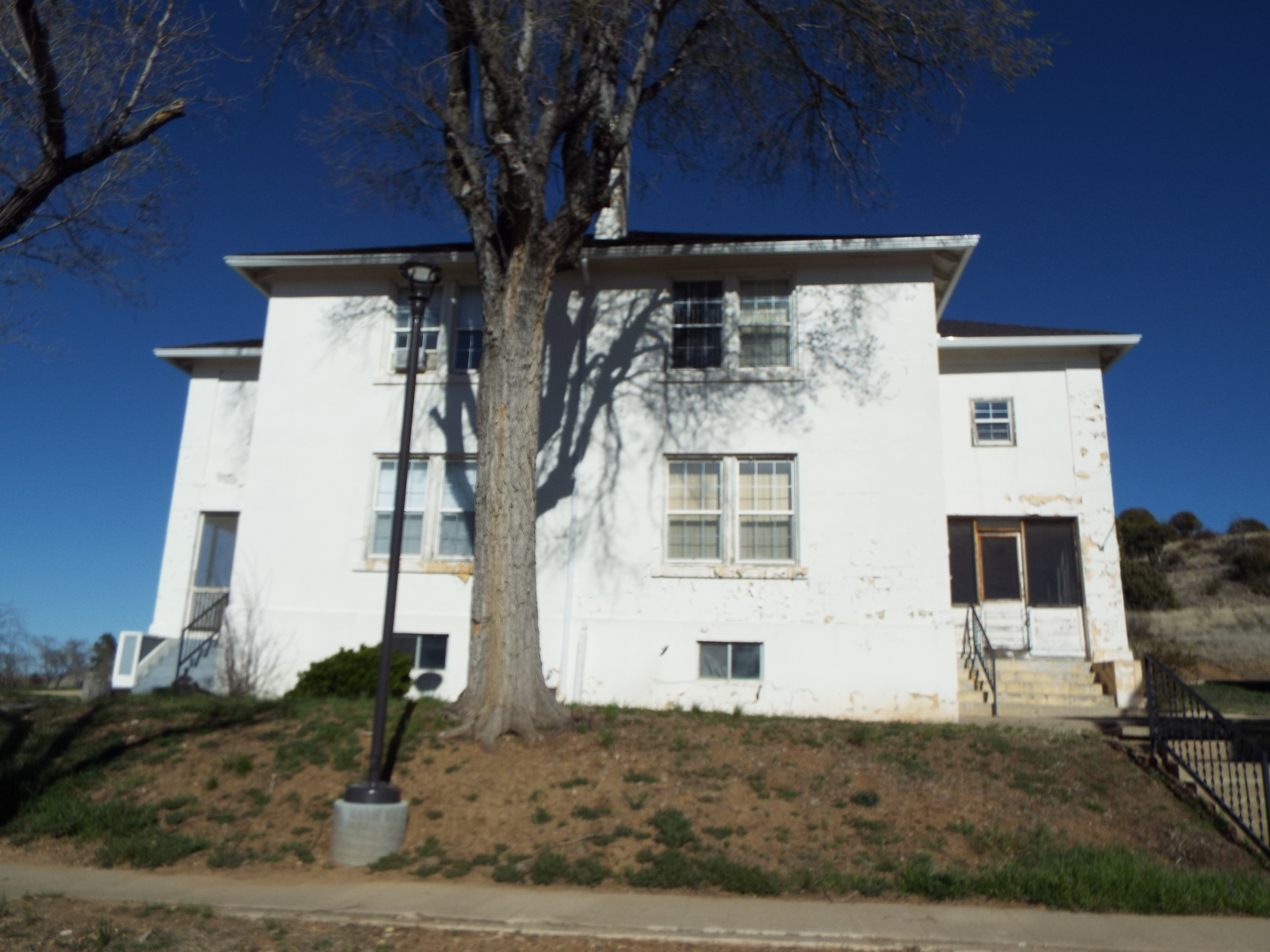
Fort Whipple NCO Quarters

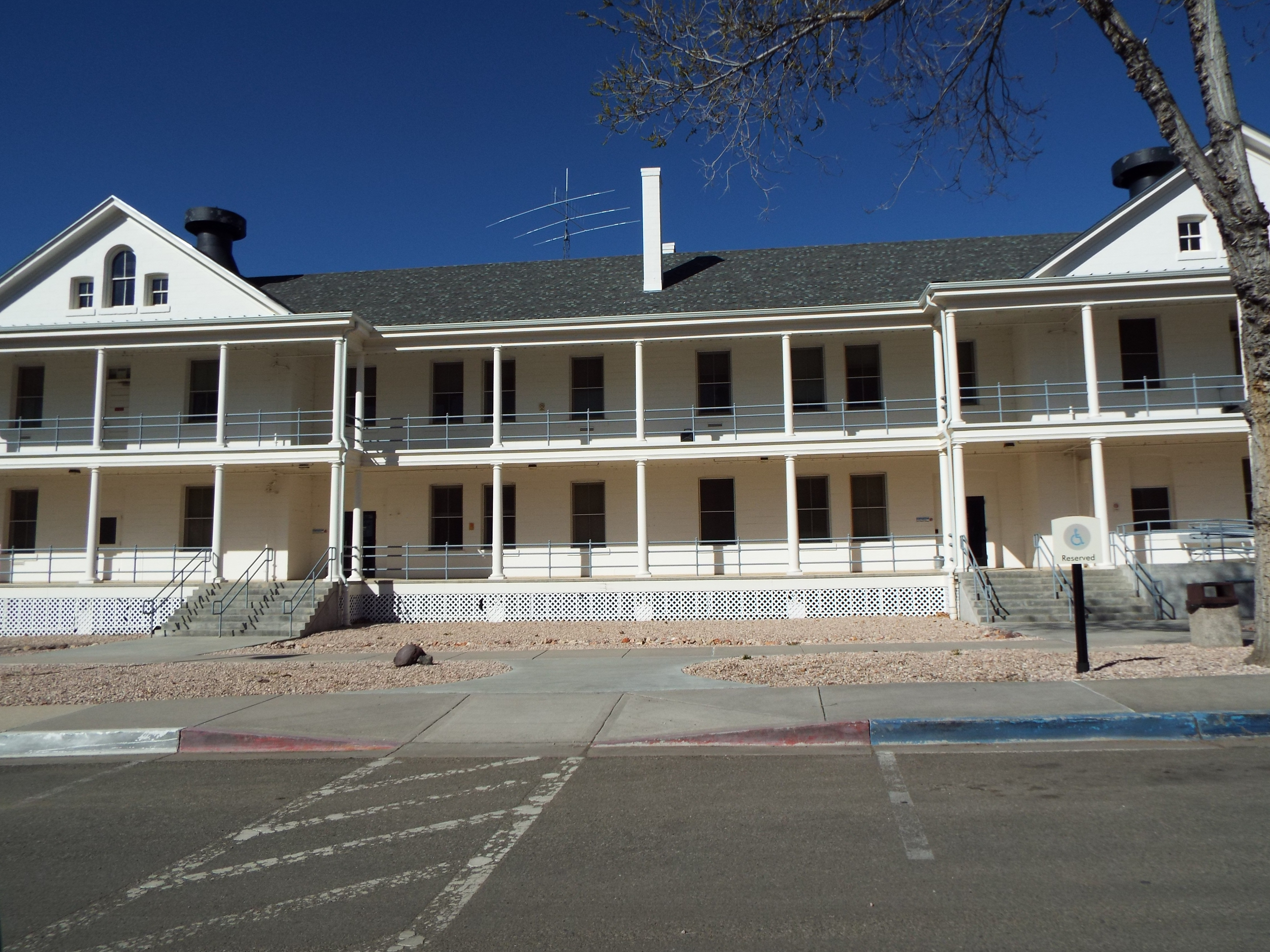
Fort Whipple Army Barracks

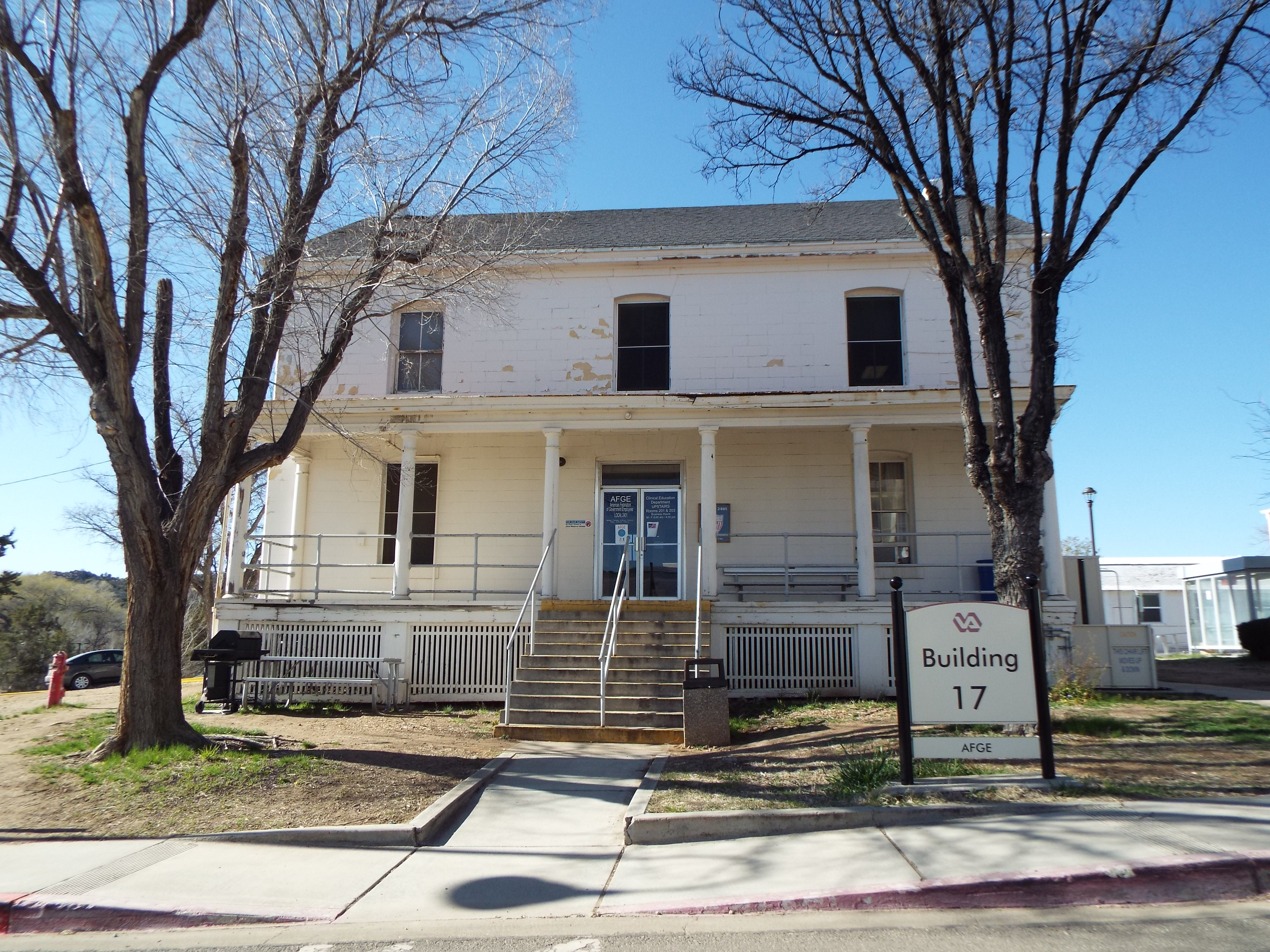
Fort Whipple Post Headquarters

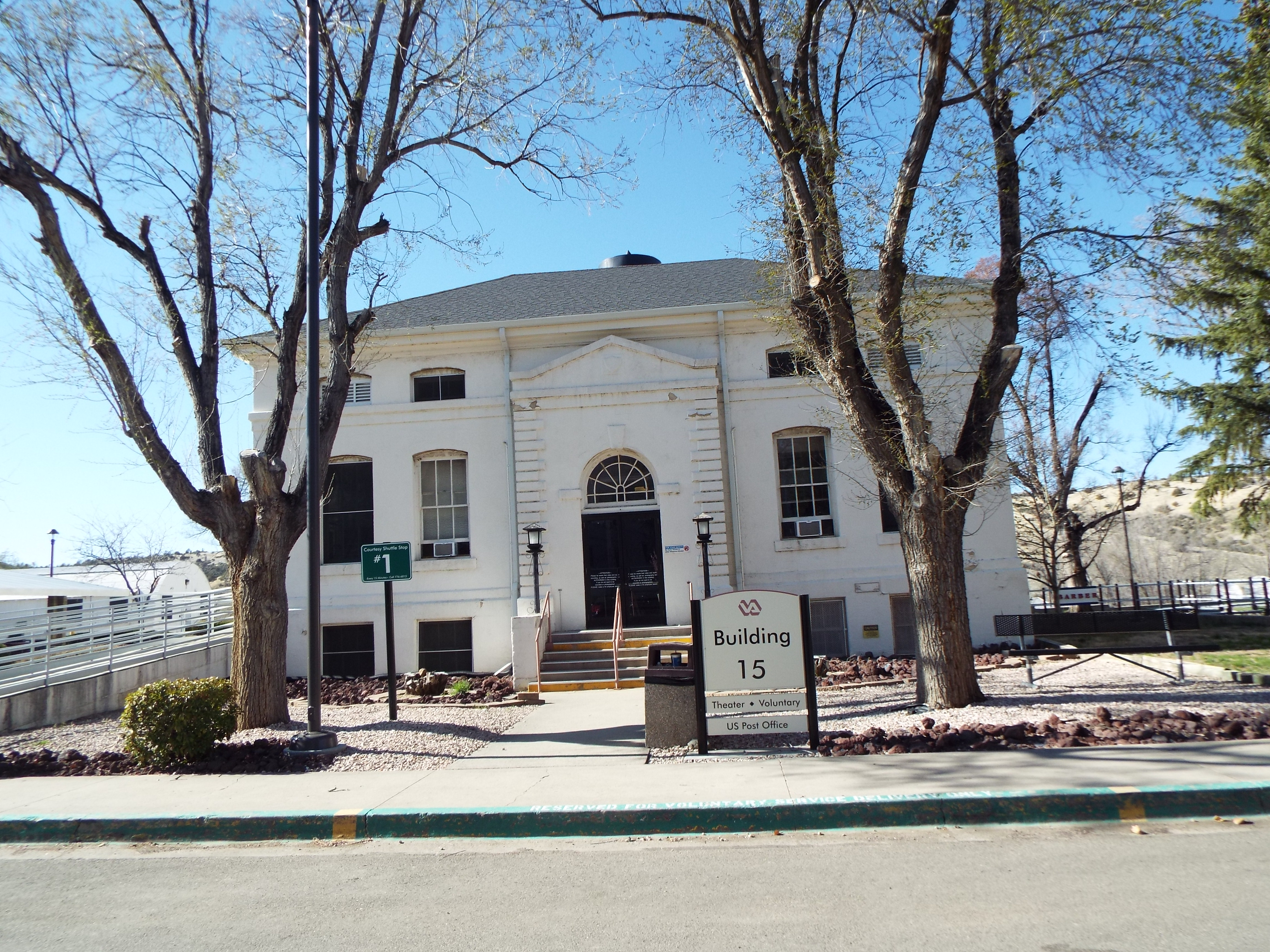
Fort Whipple Theater

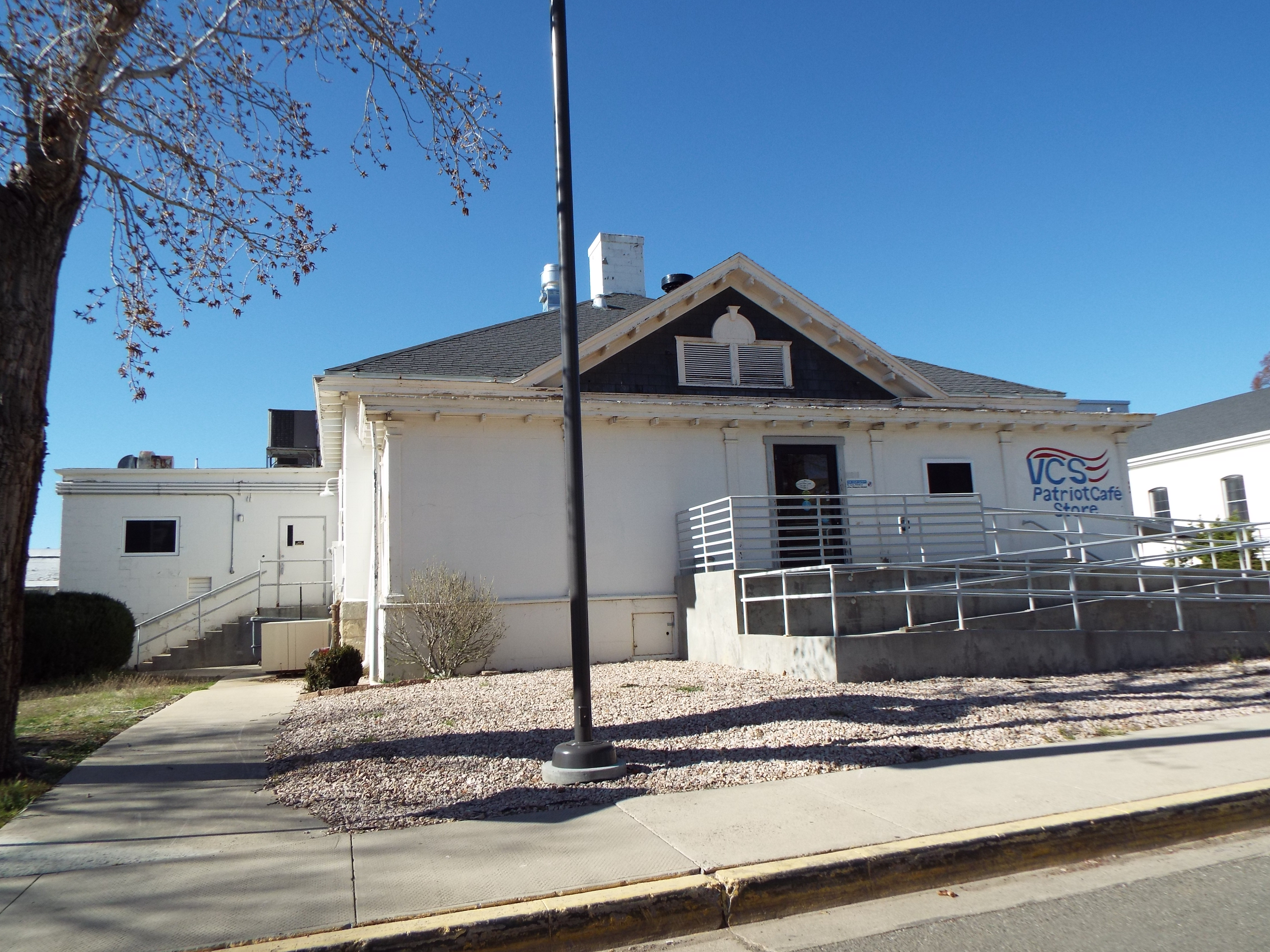
Fort Whipple Guardhouse

== See also ==
- Prescott, Arizona
- National Register of Historic Places listings in Yavapai County, Arizona
