= Kohra, Amethi =

Kohra
- Village
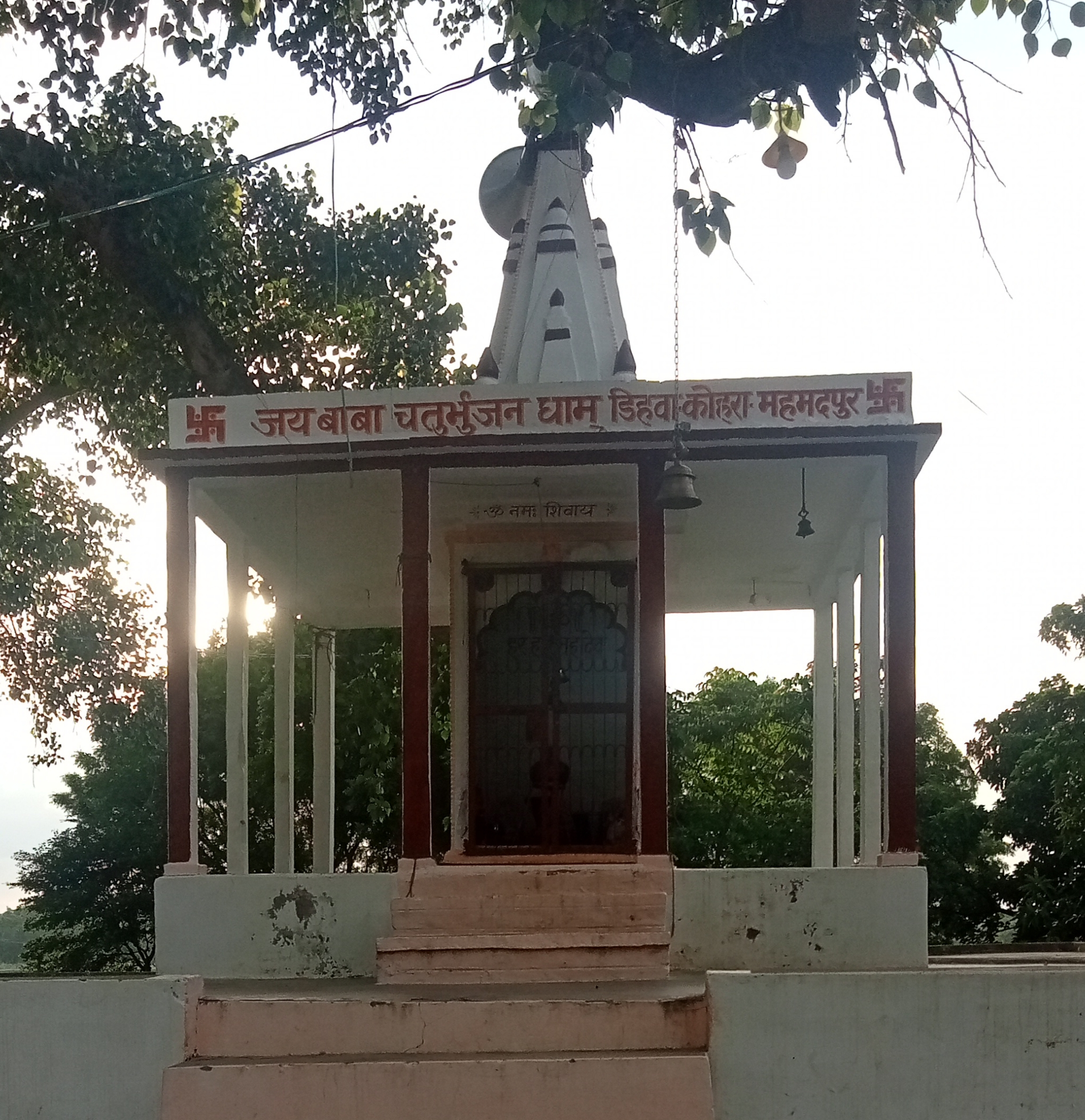
- Bhagwan Chaturbhuj Mandir, Kohra

- Location in Uttar Pradesh, India Kohra (India)
- Coordinates: 26.1687159°N 81.799299°E
- Country: India
- State: Uttar Pradesh
- Division: Ayodhya
- District: Amethi
- Established: 1636; 390 years ago
- Founder: Babu Himmat Sah

Government
  - Type: Gram Sabha

Area
  - Total: 5.771 km^{2} (2.228 sq mi)
- Elevation: 107 m (351 ft)

Population (2011)
  - Total: 4,407
  - Density: 763.6/km^{2} (1,978/sq mi)

Languages
  - Official: Hindi, Awadhi
- Time zone: UTC+05:30 (IST)
- Postal Code: 227405
- Telephone Code: +91 05368
- Vehicle Registration: UP-36

Kohra is a village in Amethi tehsil of Amethi district in the Indian state of Uttar Pradesh. Kohra was historically the seat of a large Taluqdari estate held by a leading branch of the Bandhalgoti Rajputs. As of 2011, it has a population of 4,407 people, in 786 households.

== Geography ==
Kohra's elevation is about 107 metres (351 ft) above sea level. It is surrounded by Sangrampur Block towards South, Bhetua Block towards North, Gauriganj Block towards west, Shahgarh Block towards North.

The district headquarters at Amethi lie 12 kilometres (7 mi) to the west, while the state capital at Lucknow is 134 kilometres (83 mi) distant.

== Demographics ==
As of 2011 latest census, Kohra has a population of 4407 divided into 786 families. Male population is 2181 and that of female is 2226. Kohra has an average literacy rate of 71.76 percent compared to state average of 67.68 percent, male literacy is 82.69 percent, and female literacy is 61.18 percent. In Kohra, 12.89 percent of the population is under 6 years of age.

Caste composition
Caste	Percent
SC	21.78%
Others†	78.22%
Caste composition † Other Backward Class and Forward caste.

=== Work profile ===
Out of the total population, 1522 are engaged in work or business activity. 58.80 percent of workers describe their work as main work, 330 are cultivators while 431 are agricultural labourers.

== Transport ==
All kinds of road and railway facilities are easily accessible to reach Kohra. Amethi railway station and Gauriganj railway station are the very nearby railway stations to Kohra.

== Notable people ==
- Babu Himmat Sah (Founder ruler of Kohra (estate))
- Babu Bhoop Singh (Ruler of Kohra (estate) and Leader of Indian Rebellion of 1857)
- Ravindra Pratap Singh (Former MP and Former MLA)
