= List of Rajput dynasties and states =

During the medieval and later colonial periods, many parts of the Indian subcontinent were ruled as sovereign or princely states by various dynasties of Rajputs.

The Rajputs rose to political prominence after the large empires of ancient India broke into smaller ones. The Rajputs became prominent in the early medieval period in about seventh century and dominated in regions now known as Rajasthan, Delhi, Haryana, Western Gangetic plains and Bundelkhand.

However, the term "Rajput" has been used as an anachronistic designation for Hindu dynasties before the 16th century because the Rajput identity for a lineage did not exist before this time, and these lineages were classified as aristocratic Rajput clans in the later times. Thus, the term "Rajput" does not occur in Muslim sources before the 16th century.

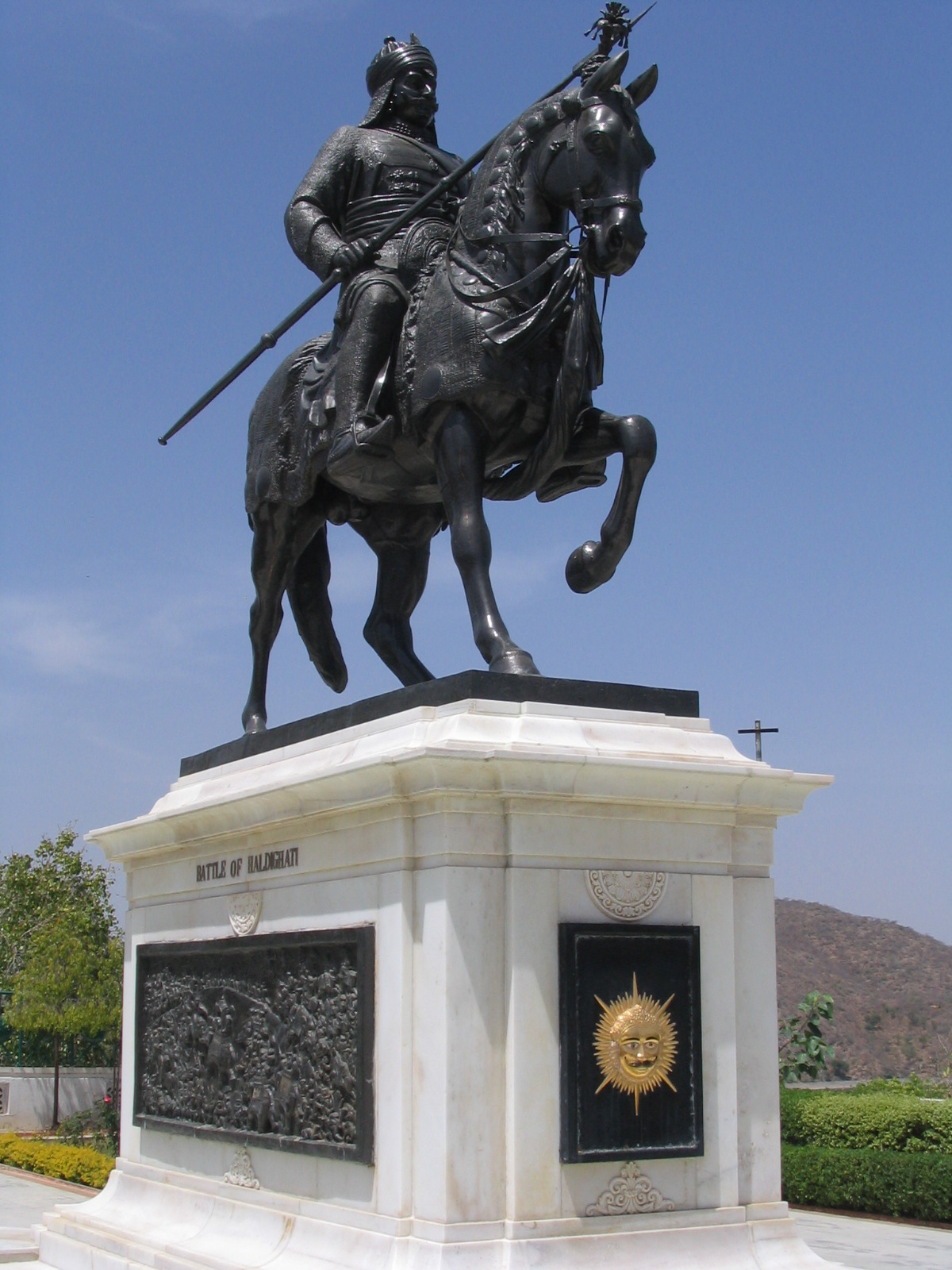
Statue of Maharana Pratap, a prominent Rajput warrior of the Sisodia dynasty of Mewar

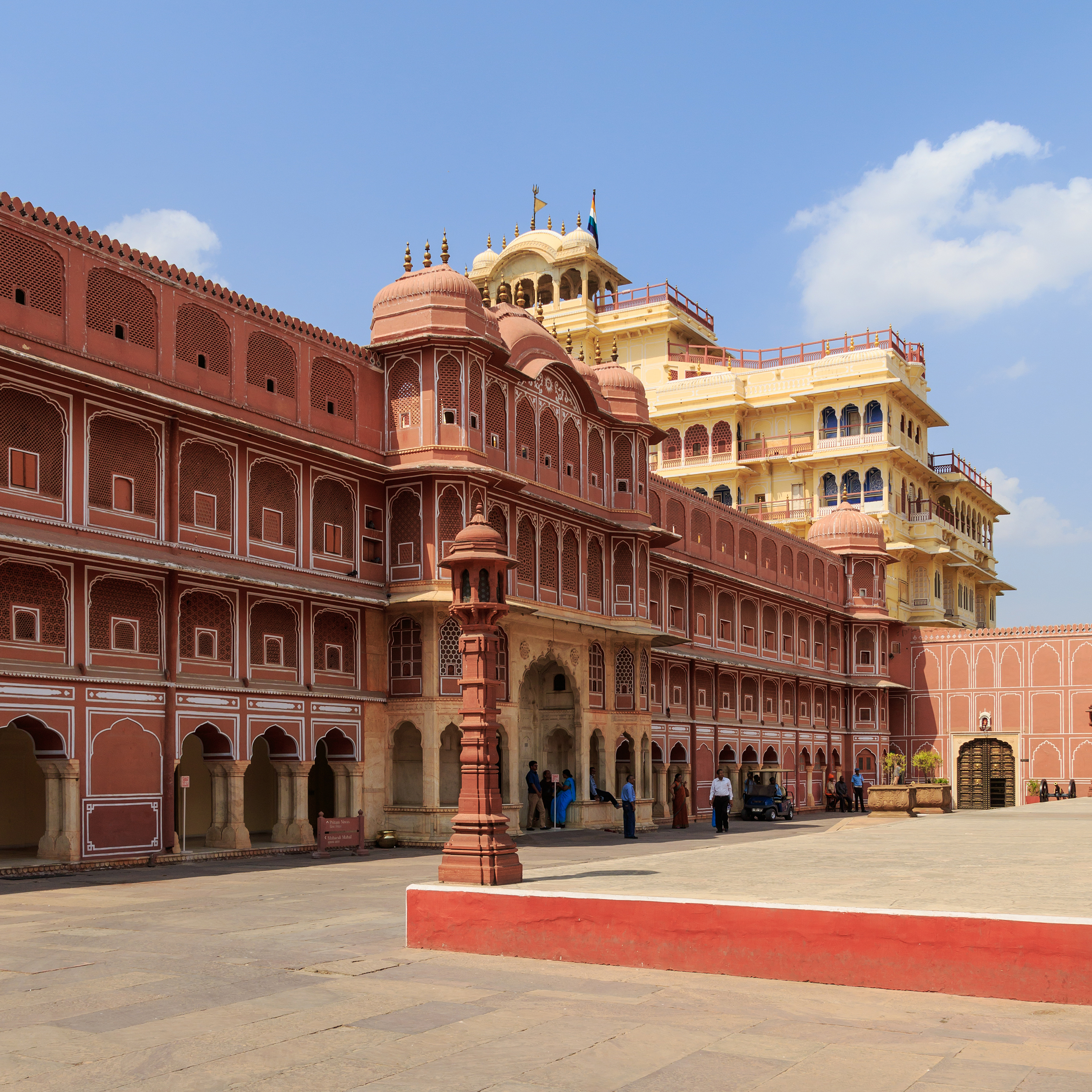
During their centuries-long rule of northern India, the Rajputs constructed several palaces. Shown here is the Chandramahal in City Palace, Jaipur, Rajasthan, which was built by the Kachwaha Rajputs.

== List ==
=== Rajasthan ===
- Guhilas of Medapata (modern Mewar), Vala, Rajpipla and Dungarpur
  - Sisodias of Pratapgarh, Mewar, Shahpura, Banswara, Dharampur, Danta and Barwani
    - Chundawats of Deogarh
- Rathores of Jodhpur, Bikaner, Kishangarh, Jhabua, Ratlam, Alirajpur, Idar, Sailana, Sitamau, Kharsawan and Seraikela
- Kachhwahas of Jaipur, Alwar, Lawa,and Maihar
  - Shekhawats of Shekhawati
  - Narukas of Unaira
  - Bandhalgotis of Amethi, Shahgarh, Kohra
- Chauhans of Sambhar, Nadol, Ranthambore, Dhami, Jashpur, Korea, Ambliara, Chhota Udaipur and Jalor
  - Hadas of Bundi, Jhalawar and Kota
  - Deoras of Bhinmal, Sirohi and Chandravati
- Jadaun or Jadon of Bayana and Karauli
- Bhatis of Jaisalmer
- Jhalas of Jhalawar, Dhrangadhra, Wankaner, Limbdi, Wadhwan, Lakhtar, Sayla and Chuda
- Gaurs of Kuchaman and Maroth
- Khanzadas of Mewat

=== Kashmir ===
- Dogras of Jammu & Kashmir

=== Uttar Pradesh ===
- Imperial Pratiharas of Kannauj and Nagod
- Paramaras of Malwa, Chhatarpur, Narsinghgarh, Rajgarh, Sant, Mohanpur, Ranasan, Wadagam, Cambay and Chandravati
  - Panwars of Garhwal and Lunavada
  - Sodhas of Amarkot
  - Ujjainiyas of Jagdishpur
- Gahadavalas of Varanasi and Kannauj
  - Bundelas of Orchha, Panna, Jigni and Ajaigarh
- Bais of Baiswada
- Bargujars of Samthar

=== Gujarat ===
- Chaulukyas (Solankis) of Gujarat
- Chudasamas of Junagadh and Vamanasthali.
  - Jadejas of Cutch State, Nawanagar State, Rajkot State, Morbi State, Gondal State, Dhrol and Rajpara
  - Sarvaiyas and Raizadas of Datha and Jesar
- Chavdas of Mansa, Varsoda and Patan
- Dors of Vadodara

=== Madhya Pradesh ===
- Tomars of Delhi, Gwalior, Nurpur (Pathania-Tomars) and Beja
- Sengars of Nai Garhi, Mangawan

=== Himachal Pradesh ===
- Chandelas of Jejakabhukti (modern Bundelkhand), Kalanjara, Gidhaur, Mahoba and Bilaspur
- Katochs of Kangra
- Jethwas of Ghumli and Porbanadar
- Chands of Kumaon

=== Jharkhand and Chattisgarh ===
- Raksels of Palamu, Udaipur and Surguja

=== Makran ===
- Gichkis of Makran

== See also ==
- List of Hindu empires and dynasties
- List of Rajputs
- List of Indian monarchs
- Rajputana
- Rajput Rebellion
- List of dynasties and rulers of Rajasthan

== Bibliography ==
- Talbot, Cynthia (2015). The Last Hindu Emperor: Prithviraj Cauhan and the Indian Past, 1200–2000. Cambridge University Press. ISBN 9781107118560.
