= Himmat =

Himmat (lit. 'courage') may refer to:

- Himmat (1941 film), a 1941 Indian film
- Himmat (1970 film), a 1970 Indian film
- Himmat (1996 film), a 1996 Indian film
- Himmat (2001 film), a 2001 Bangladeshi film featuring Shakib Khan
- Himmat (app), a women's safety mobile application of the Delhi Police
- Babu Himmat Sah, Founder ruler of Kohra (estate)
- Himmat, an Indian English-language weekly published by Rajmohan Gandhi

== See also ==
- Himmatwala (disambiguation)
