= Rajesh Masala =

Indian manufacturer, distributor and supplier of ground spicer

- Company type: Private
- Industry: Food, Spices
- Founded: 1997, Amethi
- Founder: Rajesh Agrahari
- Headquarters: Amethi, India
- Key people: Rajesh Agrahari Chandrama Devi Agrahari
- Products: Sabji Masala, Chaat Masala
- Website: rajeshmasala.com

Rajesh Masala or Rajesh Spices is an Indian manufacturer, distributor and supplier of ground spices. The company is led by its directors, Rajesh Agrahari and Chandrama Devi Agrahari.

== History ==
The company was founded in 1997 by the late industrialist R. R. Agrahari under the company banner of Agrahari Masala Udyog, in Amethi, Uttar Pradesh state, India.

Rajesh Masala Private Limited was incorporated as a private company on 13 February 2004.

== Other ==
Its director Rajesh Agrahari is also called as "Rajesh Masala" due to his brand of spice. He has been a party leader in the Samajwadi Party before his expulsion. He was expelled from the party by Chief Minister Akhilesh Yadav in July 2014 due to his involvement in what the party regarded as "anti-party activities". Thereafter, he joined the Bharatiya Janata Party.
