= Shahgarh estate =

Taluqdari estate in Oudh (1599–1947)

Shahgarh Estate
- 1599–1947
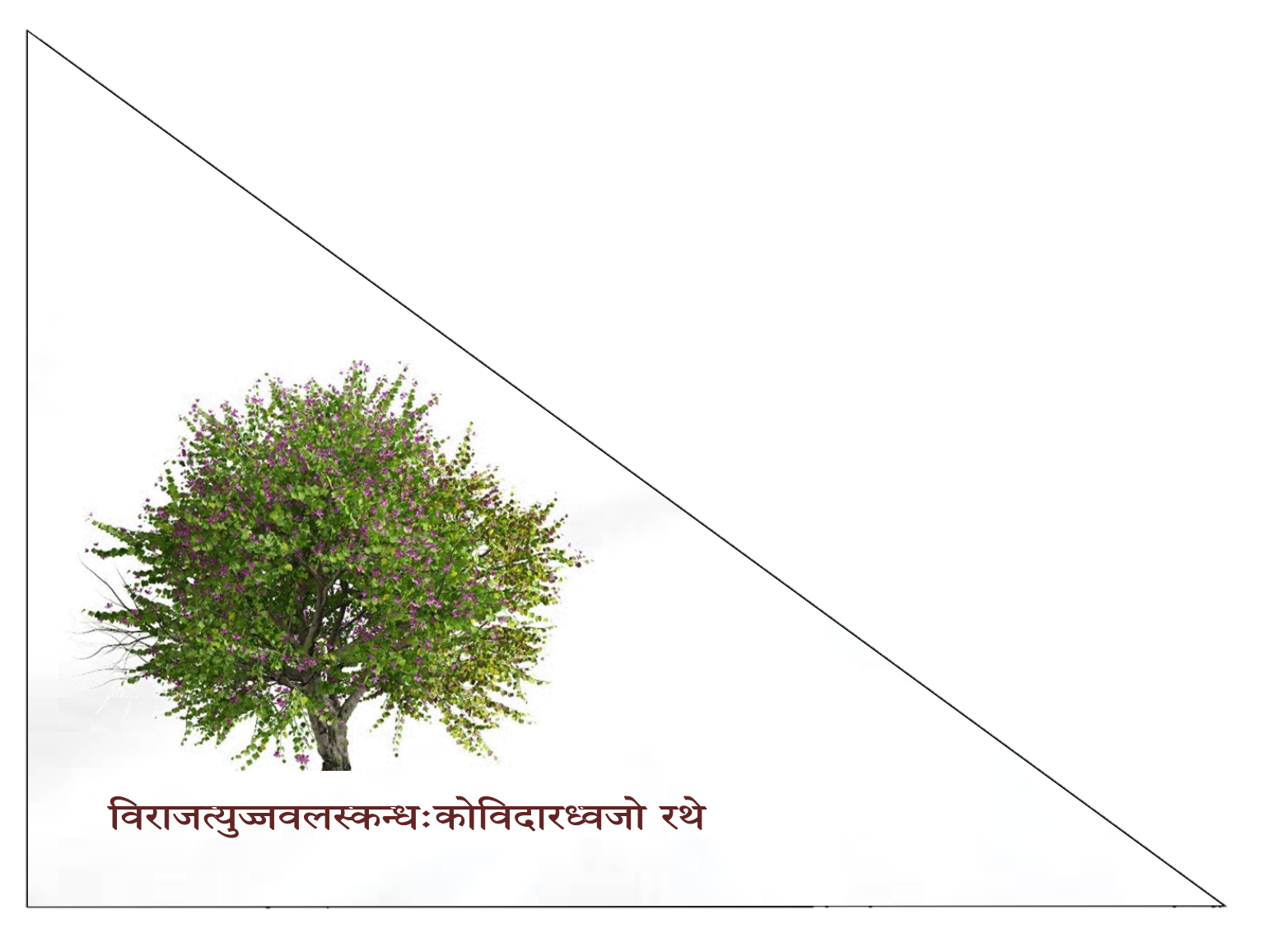
- Flag
- Status: Taluqdari estate
- Capital: Shahgarh
- Common languages: Awadhi, Hindi
- Religion: Hinduism
- Government: Monarchy
- Babu (Ruler or Chief)
  - 1599: Babu Sultan Sah (first)
  - 1947: Babu Shiv Pratap Singh (last)
- Historical era: Early modern period
  - Established: 1599
  - Acceded to India: 1947
Preceded by	Succeeded by
Amethi Estate	Dominion of India
- Today part of: Uttar Pradesh, Republic of India

Shahgarh was a Taluqdari estate located in the Amethi district (formerly part of the Sultanpur district) of Uttar Pradesh, India. The estate was ruled by the Bandhalgoti clan of the Kachhwaha Rajputs.

== History ==
According to local tradition, Shahgarh was founded by Babu Sultan Sah, the brother of Raja Bikram Sah of Amethi. The town is said to derive its name from a fort constructed by Sultan Sah and named after him. It is further reputed that the estate originally comprised 121 villages and was known as "Tafriq Sultan Sahi." Historians, however, have questioned the reliability of this account. If accurate, it would provide important evidence regarding the territorial development of the Amethi taluqa, suggesting a formal partition and indicating the approximate size of an individual share.

Some support for this theory is drawn from the fact that several villages were later divided into fractional shares between Amethi and Shahgarh. Historical records, however, indicate that these villages had previously belonged to other proprietors and were only subsequently divided into separate portions, one of which became attached to Shahgarh and the other to Amethi. Furthermore, Sultan Sah was reportedly one of four brothers, and no evidence exists that the shares of the younger brothers were equal or even approximately comparable. It is therefore considered likely that the extent of Sultan Sah's original holding has been exaggerated, particularly as Shahgarh, including its later offshoots and acquisitions, does not appear to have exceeded 132 villages in total.

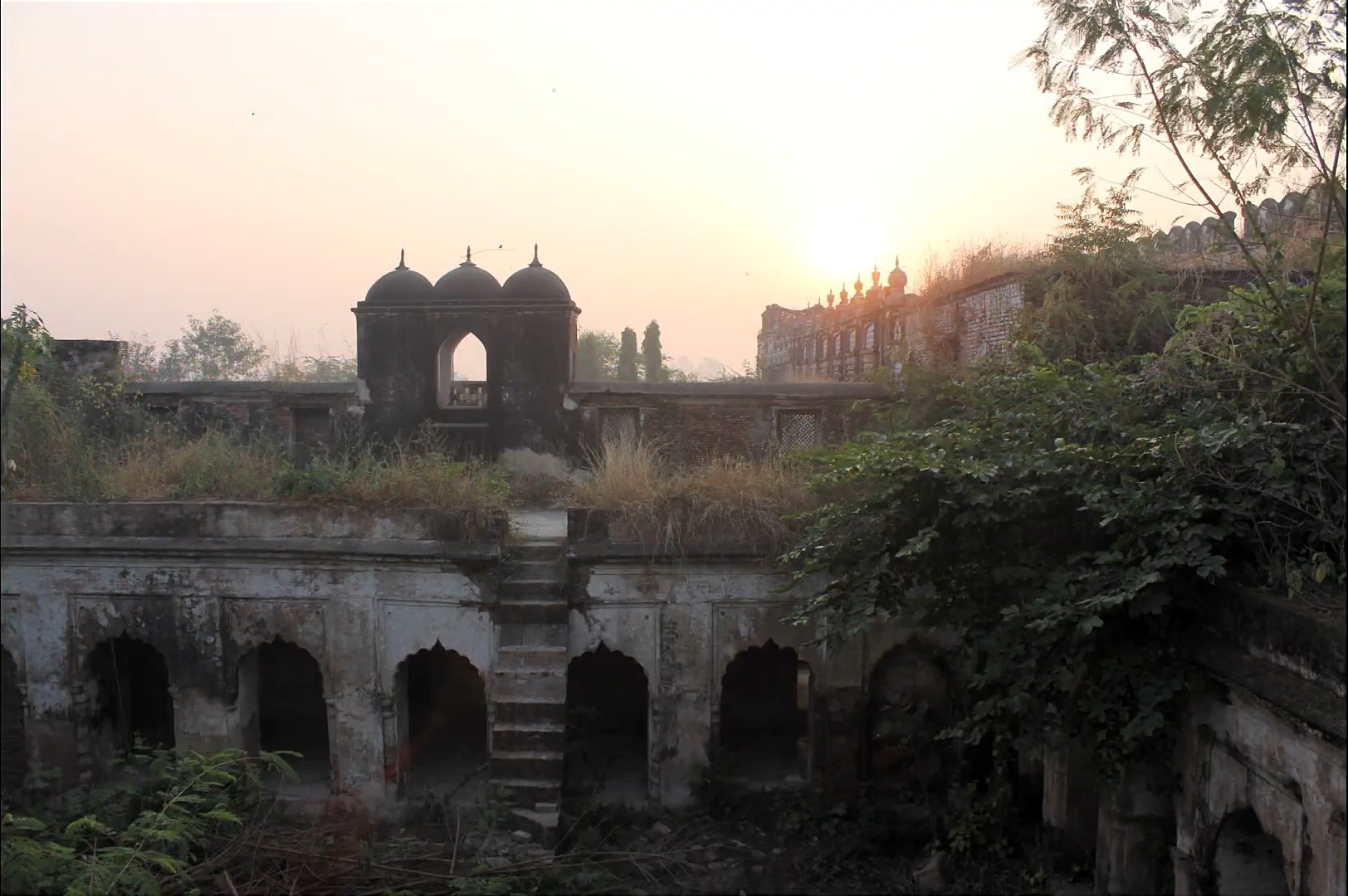
Ruins of the Shahgarh Fort, Amethi

From 1803 to 1810, Shahgarh, along with the rest of the pargana, was leased to Raja Har Chand Singh. However, the settlement of 1810 resulted in the estate being resumed by the authorities. At that time, Shahgarh comprised only 40 villages and had been reduced to roughly half its former size. In 1846, it once again came under the control of the Amethi taluqdars through the general lease granted by Maharaja Man Singh. Balwant Singh, the proprietor of the estate, strongly opposed this arrangement. In response, Raja Lal Madho Singh had him arrested and confined in order to suppress his resistance. In this sorry plight he remained at the time of William Henry Sleeman's tour. "Madhoparshad of Amethi," writes the Resident, "has lately seized upon the estate of Shahgarh, worth twenty-thousand rupees a year, which had been cut off from the Amethi estate, and enjoyed by a collateral branch of the family for several generations. He holds the proprietor Balwant Singh in prison in irons, and would soon make away with him were the Oudh Government to think it worth while to enquire after him."

The Resident's interest in the fortunes of Balwant Singh extended beyond this brief intervention. After returning to Lucknow, he presented the matter before the Darbar and, following some delay, eventually secured both Balwant Singh's release and the restoration of his estate. These events occurred at a critical moment, around the end of 1855. Had the decision been delayed by only a few months, Shahgarh would have been annexed along with Amethi and would likely have remained permanently incorporated within it.

Babu Balwant Singh supported the British during the Indian Rebellion of 1857, motivated in part by personal and political interests. He was noted for the services he rendered to the British authorities during the uprising. As a result, he retained the estate he had recovered in 1855, and his rights over it were formally recognized and protected through a taluqdari sanad granted by the colonial government. Babu Balwant Singh was succeeded by his son Babu Bijay Bahadur Singh. At the turn of the 20th century, the Shahgarh estate consisted of 20 villages and 1 patti in pargana Amethi.

Following India's independence on August 15, 1947, the Shahgarh (Taluq) estate was integrated into the Dominion of India and later the Republic of India. Babu Shiv Pratap Singh was the last ruler of Shahgarh.

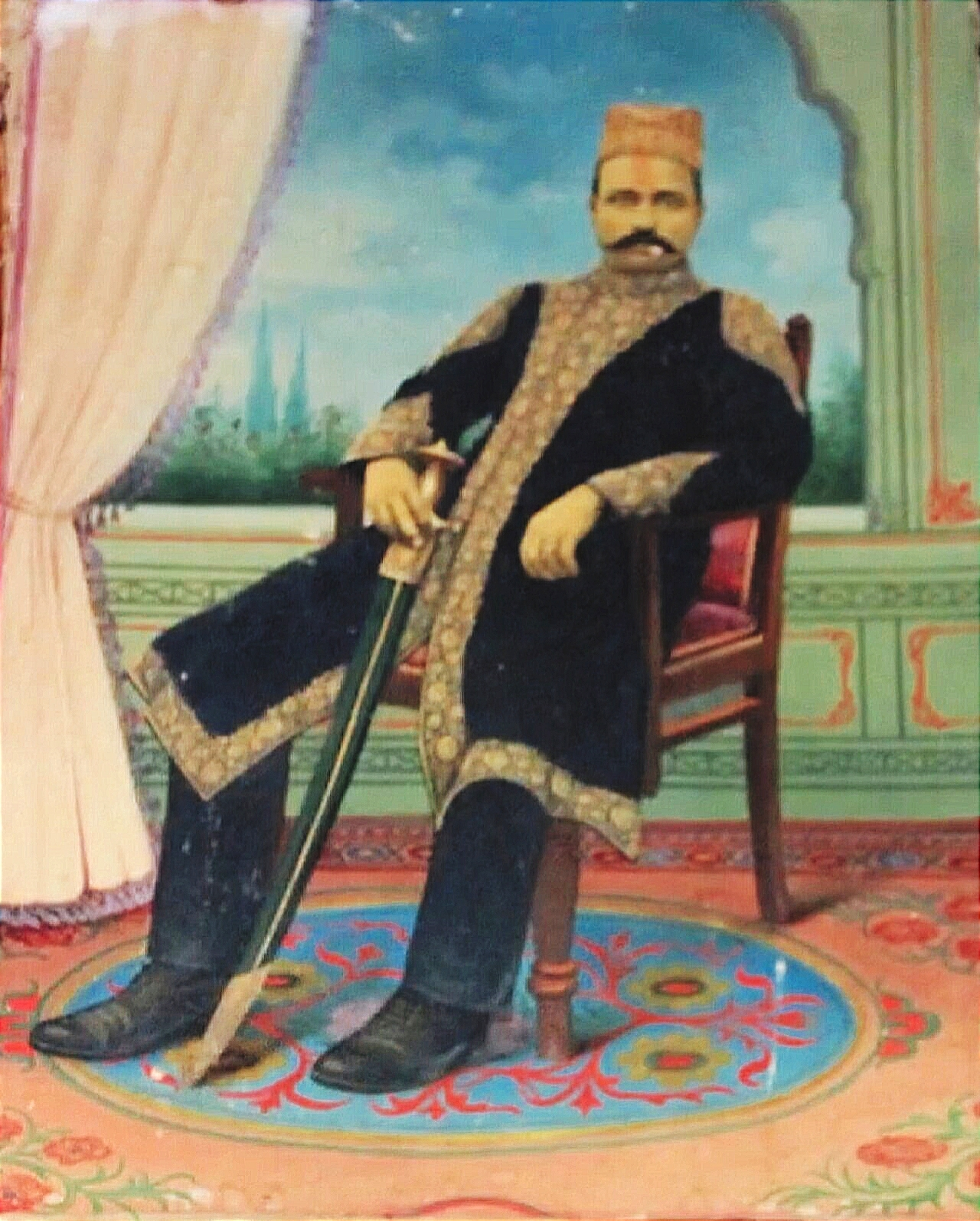
Babu Shiv Pratap Singh

== List of rulers ==
The rulers of Shahgarh bore the title of Babu. The list of rulers is following as:

- Babu Sultan Sah
- Babu Balwant Singh
- Babu Bijay Bahadur Singh
- Babu Jagmohan Singh
- Babu Shiv Pratap Singh

== See also ==
- Shahgarh
