= Kohra (estate) =

Taluqdari estate in Oudh (1636–1947)

Kohra Estate
- 1636–1947
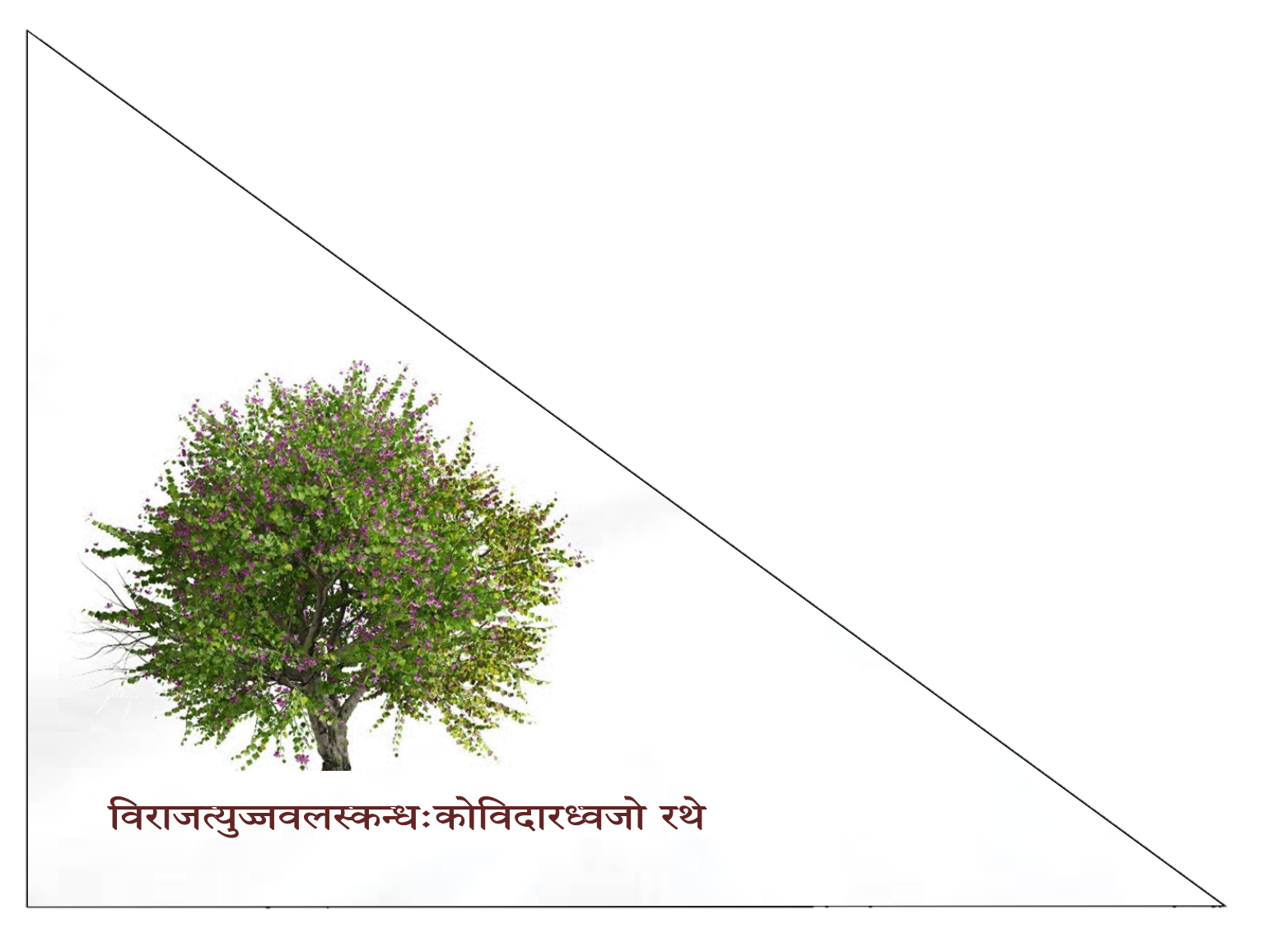
- Flag
- Status: Taluqdari estate
- Capital: Kohra
- Common languages: Awadhi, Hindi
- Religion: Hinduism
- Government: Monarchy
- Babu (Ruler or Chief)
  - 1636: Babu Himmat Sah (first)
  - 1947: Babu Beni Bahadur Singh (last)
- Historical era: Early modern period
  - Established: 1636
  - Acceded to India: 1947
Preceded by	Succeeded by
Amethi Estate	Dominion of India
- Today part of: Uttar Pradesh, Republic of India

Kohra was a Taluqdari estate of Oudh, British India. The estate was ruled by the Bandhalgoti clan of the Kachhwaha Rajputs. Now it is part of Amethi district in Uttar Pradesh, India.

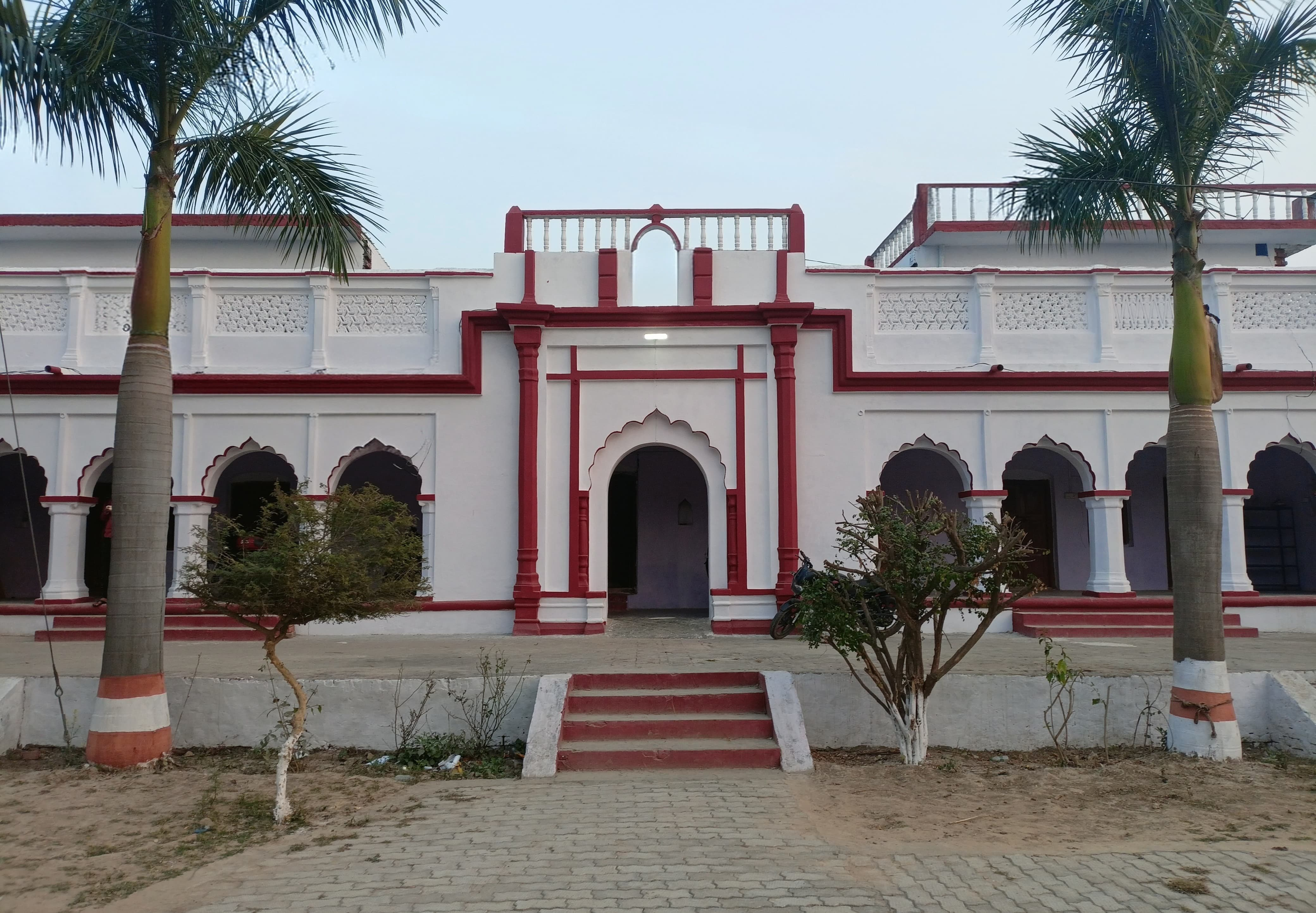
Kohra Palace

== History ==
Narwargarh in present-day Madhya Pradesh was the native place of this taluqdari lineage. Rajkumar Sodh Dev of Narwargarh founded the Amethi State in 966 CE and became its first Raja. His descendant, Rajkumar Himmat Sah, the younger son of Raja Bikram Sah of Amethi, established the Kohra estate on the auspicious occasion of Ganga Dussehra in 1636 CE. As part of the initial foundation, he established temple dedicated to Lord Chaturbhuj, marking this as the first religious and cultural establishment of the region. Following this, he constructed the Kohra Fort, where he was formally crowned as first ruler of the estate.

Under British rule, Kohra was scene of numerous battles. Babu Bhoop Singh, the then Taluqdar of Kohra was leader in the Indian Rebellion of 1857. He actively participated in the Awadh War of 1857 and played a crucial role in the siege of Lucknow residency. To counter Colonel Wroughton's advances, he fought battles at Chanda, Amhat and Kadunala in the Sultanpur district. His property was taken under the management of Court of Wards. The fort of Kohra was leveled in 1859 by order government; its ruins are still to be seen, covered with picturesque clumps of bamboos. On order of Calcutta High Court, by government removed Court of Wards from Kohra. Later, the estate was ruled by Babu Shiv Dayal Singh, who was succeeded by his nephew, Babu Devi Dayal Singh.

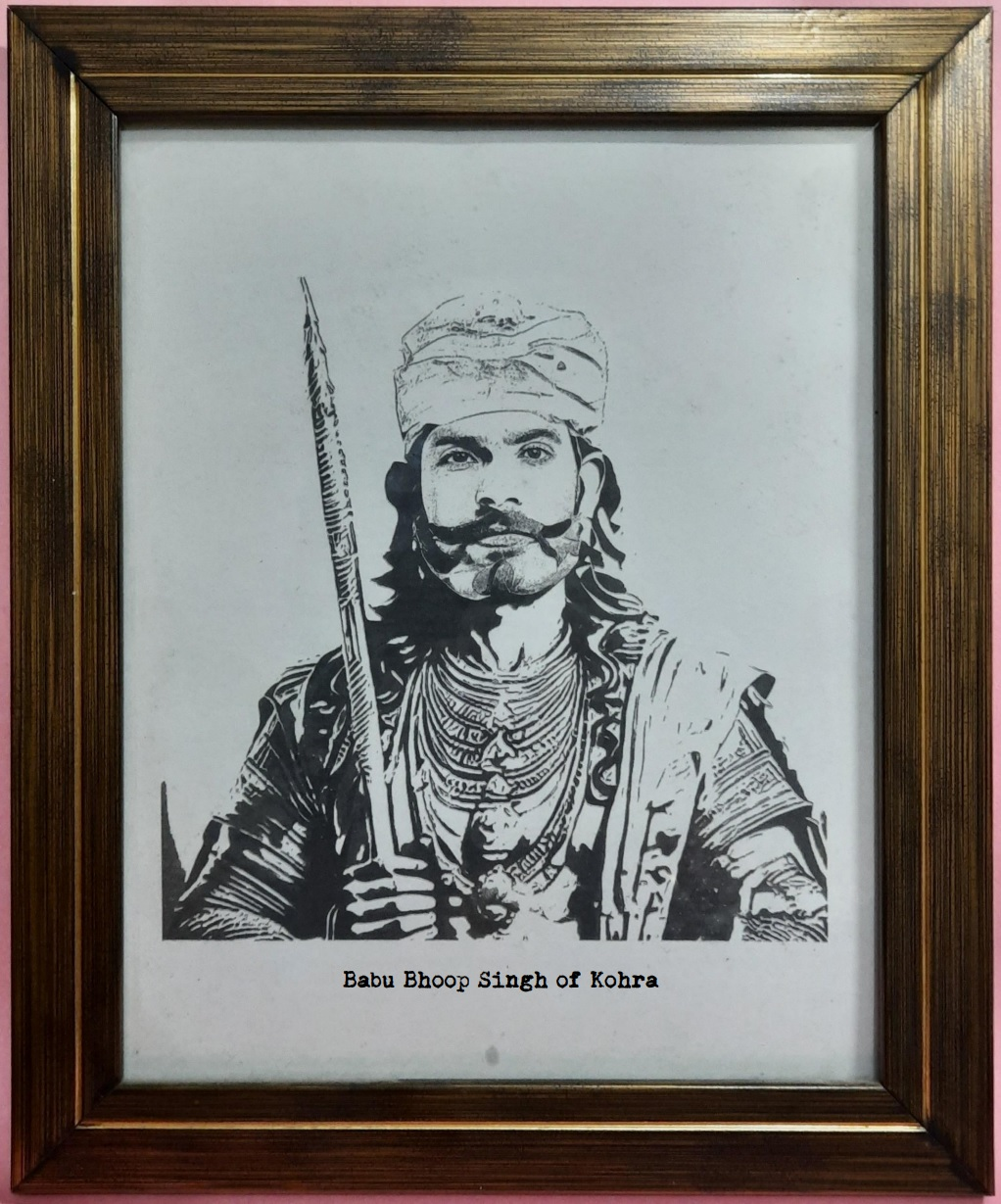
Babu Bhoop Singh, one of the most notable rulers of Kohra.

After India's independence on 15 August 1947, Kohra (Taluq) estate was merged in Dominion of India and later Republic of India. Babu Beni Bahadur Singh (died 1968), the last ruler of Kohra, actively participated and donated land in Bhoodan movement. Babu Beni Bahadur Singh had no male issue, after his death in 1968, his brother Babu Pratap Bahadur Singh proceeded as Titular ruler of Kohra, who was succeeded by his son, Babu Shiv Bahadur Singh. Babu Shiv Bahadur Singh participated in the class boycott of Udai Pratap College, Varanasi in Quit India Movement of 1942. After his death on 28 July 1993 his brother Babu Umanath Singh proceeded as Titular ruler of Kohra. Babu Umanath Singh was an educationist and founding member of Uttar Pradesh History Congress.

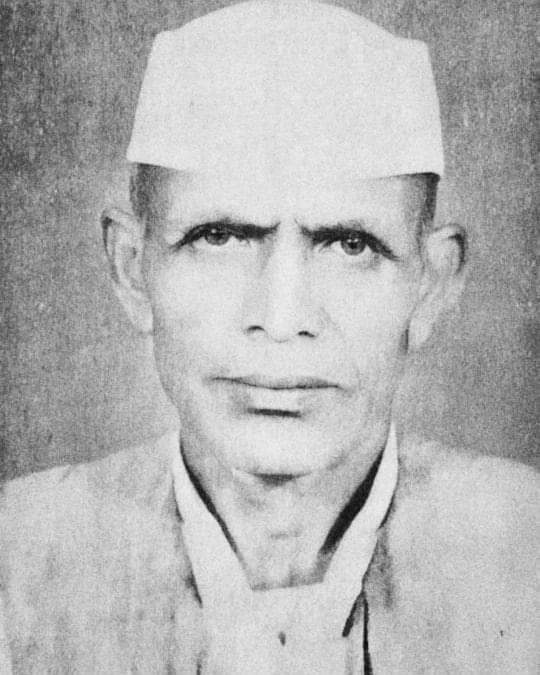
Babu Umanath Singh

== 1857 rebellion ==
During the rule of Babu Bhoop Singh, the estate took part in the Indian Rebellion of 1857. The British government confiscated his property and took over the management of the estate.

== List of rulers ==
The rulers of Kohra bore the title of Babu. The list of rulers is following as:

- Babu Himmat Sah (around 1636)
- Babu Bhoop Singh (1840–1890)
- Babu Shiv Dayal Singh
- Babu Devi Dayal Singh
- Babu Mahaveer Singh
- Babu Beni Bahadur Singh
- Babu Pratap Bahadur Singh (1968–1969)
- Babu Shiv Bahadur Singh (1969–1993)
- Babu Umanath Singh (1993–2017)
- Babu Raghvendra Pratap Singh (2017–Present)

== See also ==
- Kohra
- Amethi Estate
- Shahgarh estate
- Bandhalgoti
