= Himmatgarh, Amethi =

Himmatgarh
- Village
- Location in Uttar Pradesh, India Himmatgarh (India)
- Coordinates: 26.0929°N 81.7965°E
- Country: India
- State: Uttar Pradesh
- Division: Ayodhya
- District: Amethi
- Named after: Babu Himmat Sah

Government
  - Type: Gram Sabha

Area
  - Total: 3.909 km^{2} (1.509 sq mi)
- Elevation: 112 m (367 ft)

Population (2011)
  - Total: 1,715
  - Density: 438.7/km^{2} (1,136/sq mi)

Languages
  - Official: Hindi, Awadhi
- Time zone: UTC+5:30 (IST)
- Postal Code: 227405
- Telephone Code: +91 05368
- Vehicle Registration: UP-36

Himmatgarh is a village in Amethi tehsil of Amethi district in the Indian state of Uttar Pradesh. As of 2011, it has a population of 1,715 people, in 287 households.

== Geography ==
Himmatgarh's elevation is about 112 metres (367 ft) above sea level. It is surrounded by Amethi Block towards North, Sangipur Block towards west, Bhetua Block towards North, Sandwa Chandrika Block towards South.

The district headquarters at Amethi lie 10 kilometres to the west, while the state capital at Lucknow is 138 kilometres distant.

== Demographics ==
As of 2011 latest census, Himmatgarh has a population of 1715 divided into 287 families. Male population is 865 and that of female is 850. Kohra has an average literacy rate of 67.44 percent compared to state average of 67.68 percent, male literacy is 82.95 percent, and female literacy is 51.15 percent. In Kohra, 11.90 percent of the population is under 6 years of age.

Caste composition
Caste	Percent
SC	13.82%
Others†	86.18%
Caste composition † Other Backward Class and Forward caste.

=== Work profile ===
Out of the total population, 513 are engaged in work or business activity. 58.09 percent of workers describe their work as main work, 132 are cultivators while 73 are agricultural labourers.

== Transport ==
All kinds of road and railway facilities are easily accessible to reach Himmatgarh. Amethi railway station and Mishrauli railway station are the very nearby railway stations to Himmatgarh.
