= Shahgarh, Amethi =

Shahgarh Shāhgarh
- Village
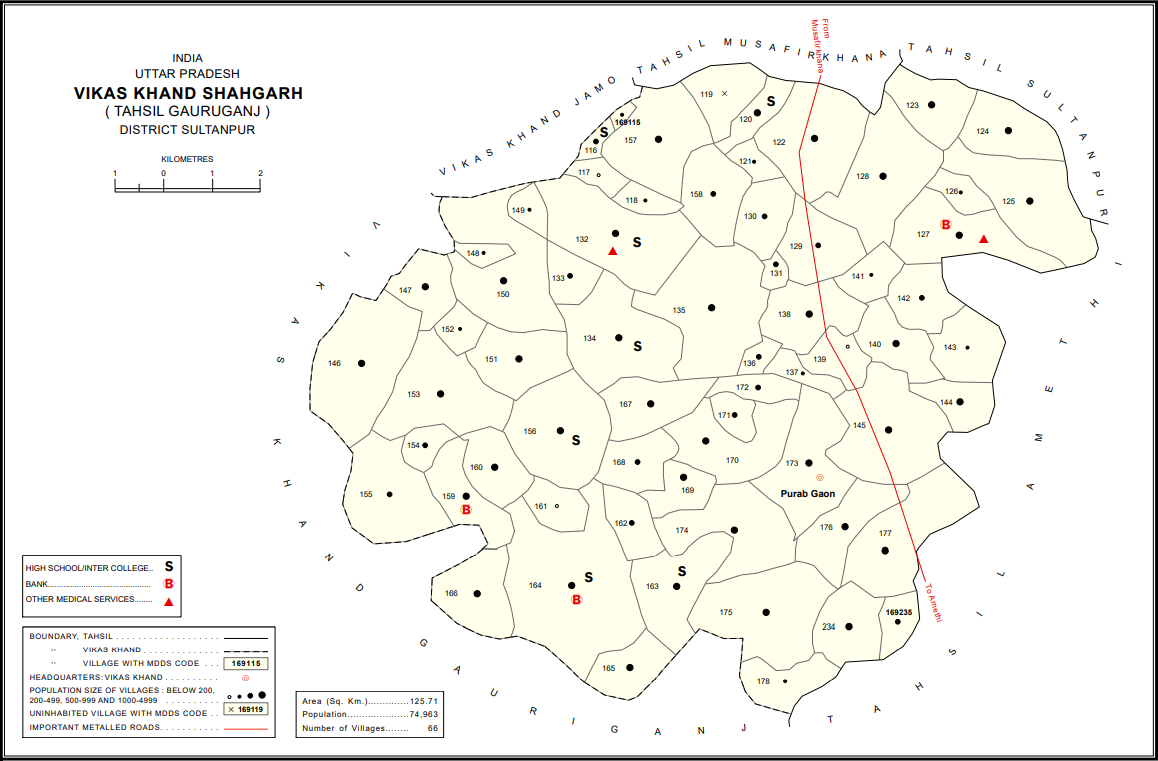
- Map showing Shahgarh (#170) in Shahgarh CD block

- Location in Uttar Pradesh, India
- Coordinates: 26.260547°N 81.773618°E
- Country: India
- State: Uttar Pradesh
- Division: Faizabad division
- District: Amethi
- Established: 1599; 427 years ago
- Founder: Babu Sultan Sah
- Named for: Babu Sultan Sah

Area
  - Total: 3.873 km^{2} (1.495 sq mi)

Population (2011)
  - Total: 3,201
  - Density: 826.5/km^{2} (2,141/sq mi)

Languages
  - Official: Hindi, Urdu
- Time zone: UTC+5:30 (IST)

Shahgarh is a village and community development block headquarters in Gauriganj tehsil of Amethi district, Uttar Pradesh, India. As of 2011, it has a population of 3,201 people, in 525 households. It historically was the seat of a taluqdari estate held by a branch of the Bandhalgoti Rajputs. Today it serves as the seat of a nyaya panchayat which also includes 13 other villages.

== History ==
The original fort of Shahgarh was founded by and named after Sultan Sah, brother of Bikram Sah the ruler of Amethi. His descendants held the Shahgarh taluqdari estate. Originally the estate supposedly consisted of 121 villages, suggesting a regular partition, but this is unlikely since another brother, Lachhmi Narain, received the much smaller Kannu estate. From 1803 to 1810, the Shahgarh estate was leased to Raja Har Chand Singh of Amethi along with the entire pargana of Amethi; it then comprised 40 villages. It had increased to 60 villages by 1846, when it was again leased to Amethi. When Balwant Singh, the taluqdar of Shahgarh, resisted the lease, Raja Lal Madho Singh of Amethi had him imprisoned. The British officer William Henry Sleeman brought the issue before the Nawab of Awadh and in 1855 was able to secure Balwant Singh's release and restoration to his property; Balwant Singh later sided with the British during the Indian Rebellion of 1857. At the turn of the 20th century, the Shahgarh estate consisted of 20 villages and 1 patti in pargana Amethi. At that time, Shahgarh itself was described as a prosperous village with a market.

The 1951 census recorded Shahgarh as comprising 13 hamlets, with a total population of 1,112 people (549 male and 563 female), in 254 households and 252 physical houses. The area of the village was given as 701 acres. 160 residents were literate, 158 male and 2 female. The village was listed as belonging to the pargana of Amethi and the thana of Gauriganj. The village had a district board-run primary school with 80 students in attendance as of 1 January 1951.

The 1961 census recorded Shahgarh as comprising 13 hamlets, with a total population of 1,239 people (618 male and 621 female), in 279 households and 267 physical houses. The area of the village was given as 701 acres and it had a post office at that point. It was then part of Bhitua CD block.

The 1981 census recorded Shahgarh as having a population of 1,722 people, in 355 households, and having an area of 274.39 hectares. The main staple foods were listed as wheat and rice.

The 1991 census recorded Shahgarh as having a total population of 2,152 people (1,130 male and 1,022 female), in 396 households and 382 physical houses. The area of the village was listed as 276.00 hectares. Members of the 0-6 age group numbered 388, or 18% of the total; this group was 52% male (201) and 48% female (187). Members of scheduled castes numbered 402, or 19% of the village's total population, while no members of scheduled tribes were recorded. The literacy rate of the village was 35% (474 men and 143 women, counting only people age 7 and up). 724 people were classified as main workers (573 men and 151 women), while 0 people were classified as marginal workers; the remaining 1,428 residents were non-workers. The breakdown of main workers by employment category was as follows: 371 cultivators (i.e. people who owned or leased their own land); 245 agricultural labourers (i.e. people who worked someone else's land in return for payment); 1 worker in livestock, forestry, fishing, hunting, plantations, orchards, etc.; 0 in mining and quarrying; 0 household industry workers; 1 worker employed in other manufacturing, processing, service, and repair roles; 0 construction workers; 4 employed in trade and commerce; 1 employed in transport, storage, and communications; and 101 in other services.

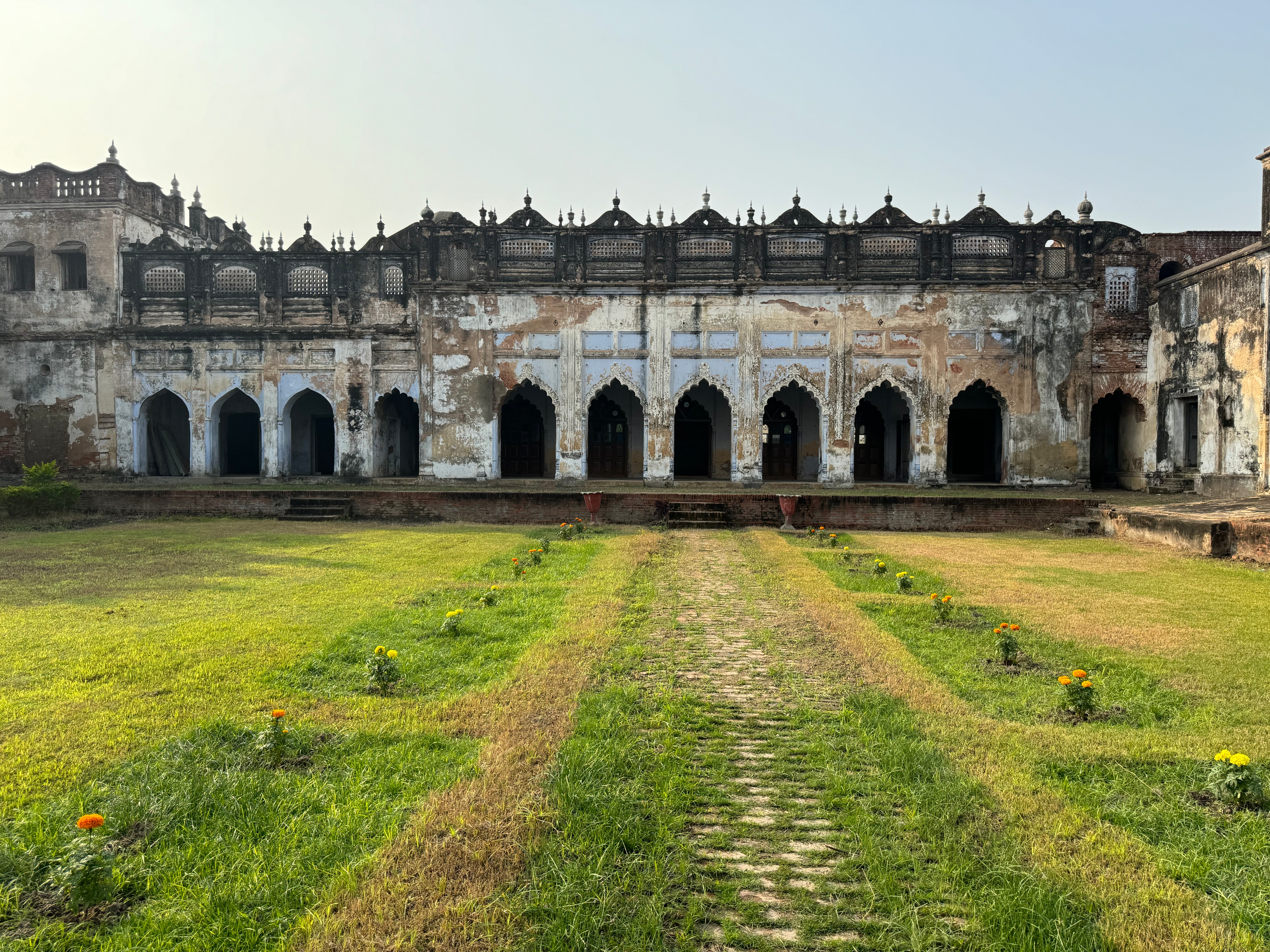
Shahgarh Palace

The Shahgarh fort today survives and is in fairly good condition maintained by the family of the erstwhile Talukdar's that continues to live in the complex. There is also a lake on the north side, with a small temple on an island abutting the palace complex that was once part of the larger complex but is now abandoned and silted.

== Villages ==
Shahgarh CD block has the following 66 villages:

Village name	Total land area (hectares)	Population (in 2011)
Harkarnpur	34.9	255
Bagia Kailash	81.5	523
Govindapur	50.9	3
Jagaipur	66.9	263
Dalipgarh	8	0
Tejgarh	223.5	1,062
Purkhipur	80.2	393
Hardoiya	382	1,883
Pichhaura	166.2	1,007
Kishundaspur	220.2	1,120
Ulra	384.8	1,780
Purehirbal	41	209
Chandauki	254	1,688
Ramshahpur	290.3	1,167
Tarsara	165.2	849
Rajapur Kasrawan	126.6	613
Asura	30.7	562
Nawada Kishun Garh	412.2	2,977
Pachhela	76.9	618
Dakkhin Gaon	366.6	1,425
Kasrawan	402.6	1,977
Sawanka Gaon	62.7	535
Loniyapur	22.5	306
Paniyar	215.2	1,542
Bharatpur	60.8	193
Hariharpur	119.3	1,068
Keshopur	109	379
Karaiya	162	577
Parbhanpur	153.5	399
Soraon	192.3	1,258
Jalama	340.1	2,245
Afuia	418.8	2,550
Pure Ebadulla	141.5	1,013
Khakhardei	52.8	307
Chhariyawan	69.1	408
Sewainhem Garh	426.7	2,378
Chilbili	165.1	1,207
Paharpur	74	373
Juthipur	348.2	1,922
Dandupur	53	769
Bahorikpur	253.4	928
Kitiyawan	346	3,044
Bahorakha	293.9	1,775
Samsheria	193	873
Bhaniyapur	161.9	1,088
Kushbaira	150.2	1,161
Gadiyan	91.5	176
Dewar Dewakali	145.4	530
Rajapur Kauhar	249.6	1,274
Kauhar	542.8	2,859
Juryapur	120.3	1,327
Dulapur Khurd	171.5	1,014
Eksara	183.1	1,135
Birrampur	120.1	881
Paliya	116	1,072
Shahgarh (block headquarters)	387.3	3,102
Kapoorpur	44.2	565
Nabbadih	117.8	515
Purab Gaon	292.3	2,136
Dulapur Kalan	240.5	2,584
Garthauliya	421	2,399
Lohangpur	193.3	1,072
Nohre Pur	312.9	1,718
Lonara	128.4	255
Tandawa	165.1	1,128
Ujjaini	77.5	549
Block total	74,963	12,570.8
Village name	Total land area (hectares)	Population (in 2011)
