= Himmatwala =

Himmatwala in Hindi-Urdu means "courageous". It may refer to:

- Himmatwala (1983 film), a 1983 Bollywood action-drama film starring Jeetendra and Sridevi directed by K. Raghavendra Rao
- Himmatwala (1998 film), a 1998 Hindi-language Indian film starring Mithun Chakraborty and Ayesha Jhulka in lead roles and directed by Jayant Gilatar
- Himmatwala (2013 film), a Bollywood action comedy film directed by Sajid Khan, featuring Ajay Devgn opposite Tamannaah in the lead roles

== See also ==
- Himmatvar, 1996 Indian film
- Himmat (disambiguation)
