= Chandrama Devi Agrahari =

Indian politician

Chandrama Devi Agrahari is a twice time elected president of Amethi Nagar Panchayat of Uttar Pradesh, India. She is wife of industrialist and Bhartiya Janta Party leader Rajesh Agrahari.

== Career ==
In November 2013, she was won Nagar Panchayat election as an independent candidate from Amethi constituency by margin 2085 votes, defeated nearest candidate Mohammad Laeek. She received total 3969 votes in the 2013 election. Congress received a jolt, when their candidate Lila Devi came on third spot in Amethi nagar panchayat under the Rahul Gandhi's parliamentary constituency, while independent Chandrama Devi was declared elected from there.

From November 2006 to present, she is incumbent president, representing Amethi Nagar Panchayat of state Uttar Pradesh. Chandrama Devi is also a director and authorized representative of Rajesh Masala from 13 February 2004 and Rajesh Milk Private Limited from 26 April 2012, registered with Ministry of Corporate Affairs (MCA).
