= Babu Bhoop Singh =

Ruler of Kohra and Leader of the Indian rebellion of 1857

- Babu of Kohra
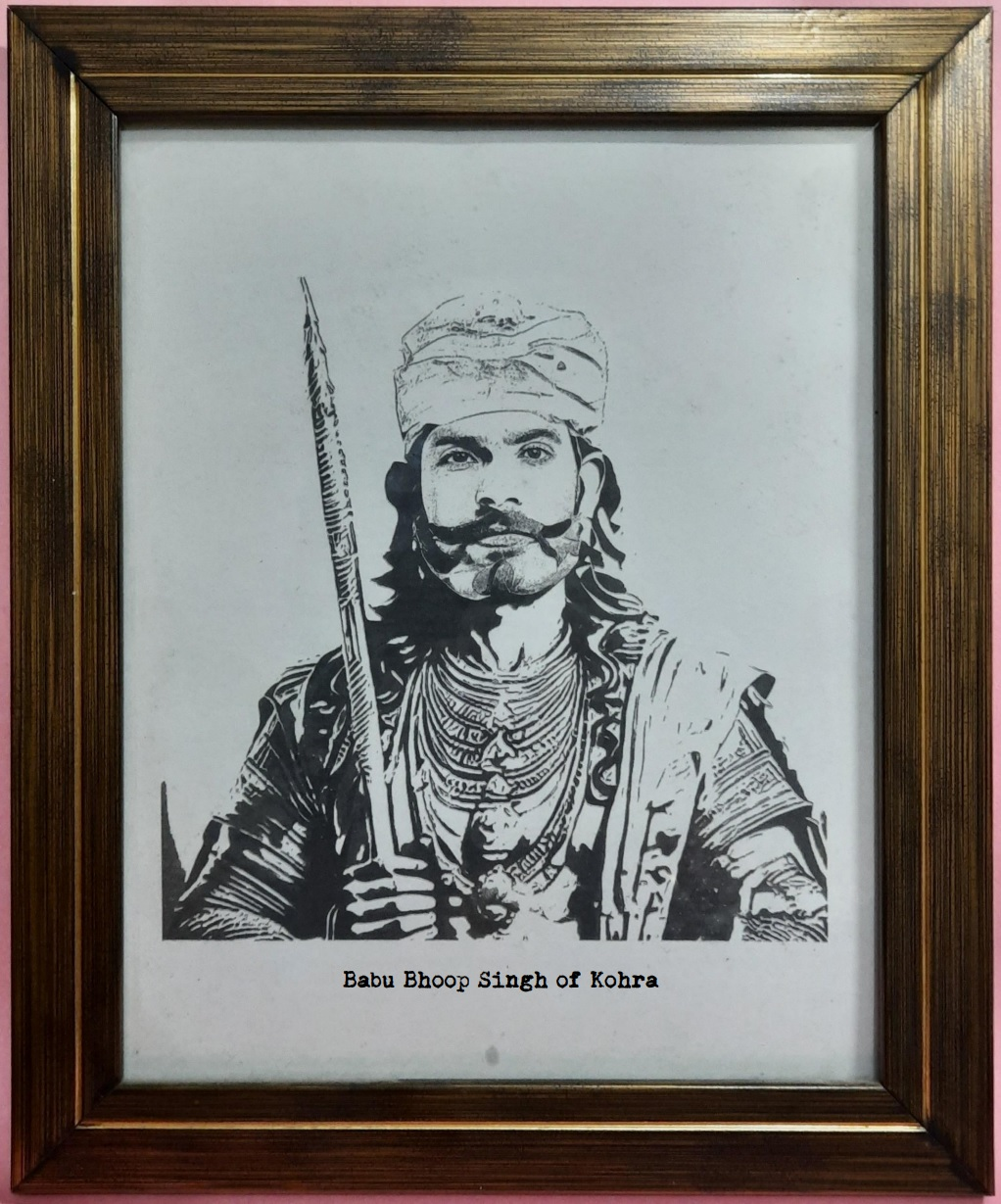
- Portrait of Babu Bhoop Singh

10th Bandhalgoti Ruler of Kohra
- Reign: 19th century
- Successor: Babu Shiv Dayal Singh
- Born: Kohra, Oudh
- Issue: 3
- House: Bandhalgoti
- Dynasty: Kachhwaha
- Religion: Hinduism

Babu Bhoop Singh was one of the most prominent leaders in the Indian Rebellion of 1857 from the Oudh region, which is now part of the Indian state of Uttar Pradesh. He hailed from the Bandhalgoti clan of Rajputs and was the ruler of the Kohra (estate) in present-day Amethi district. He led a rebellion against the British forces in 1857. He took an active part in the Awadh War of 1857, playing a vital role in the siege of the Lucknow residency. To counter Colonel Wroughton's advances, he engaged in battles at Chanda, Amhat and Kadunala in the Sultanpur district. His property was taken under the management of Court of Wards. On order of Calcutta High Court, by government removed Court of Wards from Kohra. Later, the estate was ruled by Babu Shiv Dayal Singh.

== See also ==
- Kohra (estate)
- Amethi
