= Himmat (app) =

Women's safety application in India

Himmat is an Indian women's safety mobile application of Delhi Police. It was launched by Home Minister Rajnath Singh on 1 January 2015. The app is freely available for Android mobile phones and can be downloaded from Delhi Police website. Delhi Police plans to launch app for other platforms in future. Low registrations and other problems resulted in a parliamentary panel calling the app a failure in 2018. Himmat has gone on to be called as one of India's best safety apps for women.
