= Bandhalgoti =

Rajput clan

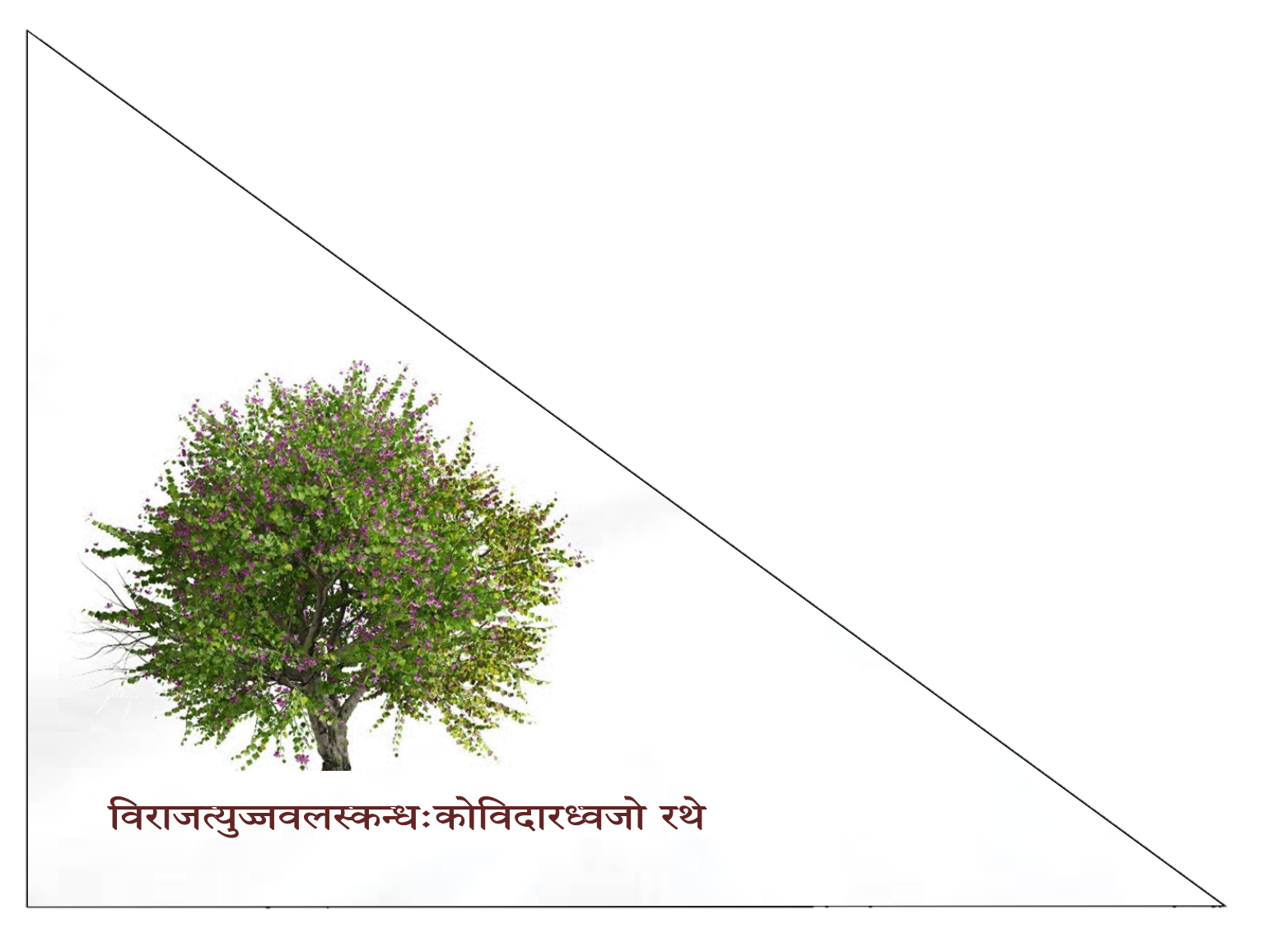
- Flag
- Parent house: Kachhwaha
- Country: Amethi; Kohra; Shahgarh
- Founded: 1358
- Founder: Raja Sut Sah
- Current head: Sanjay Singh of Amethi; Raghvendra Pratap Singh of Kohra
- Final ruler: Raja Bhagwan Baksh Singh of Amethi; Babu Beni Bahadur Singh of Kohra; Babu Shiv Pratap Singh of Shahgarh
- Titles: Raja of Amethi; Babu of Kohra; Babu of Shahgarh
- Styles: Raja; Babu

Bandhalgoti is a prominent sub-clan of the Kachhwaha dynasty of Rajputs, primarily found in the Uttar Pradesh, India. They claim descent from the Suryavamsha (Solar dynasty). Bandhalgoti Rajputs ruled a number of estates including Amethi, Kohra and Shahgarh etc. which lie in present-day Uttar Pradesh.

== Origin ==
According to their own account, the Bandhalgotis are of Súrajbans by origin, a branch of Kachhwaha rajputs, and a scion of that house, now represented by the Rája of Jaipur. About 900 years ago, Súda Rai, a scion of that house, left his home in Narwargarh and set out on a pilgrimage to the holy city of Ajodhya. His route lay across the present-day area of Amethi, where a deserted and dilapidated shrine of Debi suddenly presented itself to his view. After performing his devotions, he saw a vision of the Goddess, who disclosed to him a lofty destiny ordained for him and his descendants—they were to become hereditary lords of the territory in which he was then a temporary sojourner. Prepared to further the fulfillment of this vision, he entered the service of the Bhar chieftain and secured his elevation to the post of minister. When the Bhar master designed, as a crowning act of favour, to bestow his daughter upon him in marriage, Súda Rai, as a Súrajbans, felt he could not sully his lineage by a misalliance, and he contemptuously refused the proffered honor. The Bhar chief, in offended pride, at once deprived him of his office, and he returned to Narwargarh. Driven by thoughts of the promised land, he later collected a picked band of followers and marched against Amethi, where the Bhars were defeated and the Súrajbans occupied their territory, with Súda Rai establishing a fort on the spot where he had seen the prophetic vision.

Following the fulfillment of the vision, Suda Rai Kachwaha of Narwargarh subdued the Bhars at Amethi and was subsequently rewarded with a jagir by the Emperor of Kannauj in the Sultanpur district.

The clan name is derived from events in the sixth generation of this line, when the ruler Mandhata Singh, fearing the line was threatened to become extinct as he remained childless in his old age, sought the aid of a saint named Kanakmun, who resided in the village of Kannu. By means of the saint’s prayers and austerities, the threatened calamity was averted, and a son was born. He was at first called Sut Sah; but when he was taken to be presented to the saint, the latter suggested that his name should be Bandhu. In memory of the circumstances of his birth, the clan adopted the name Bandhugoti, which evolved into the current name, Bandhalgoti.

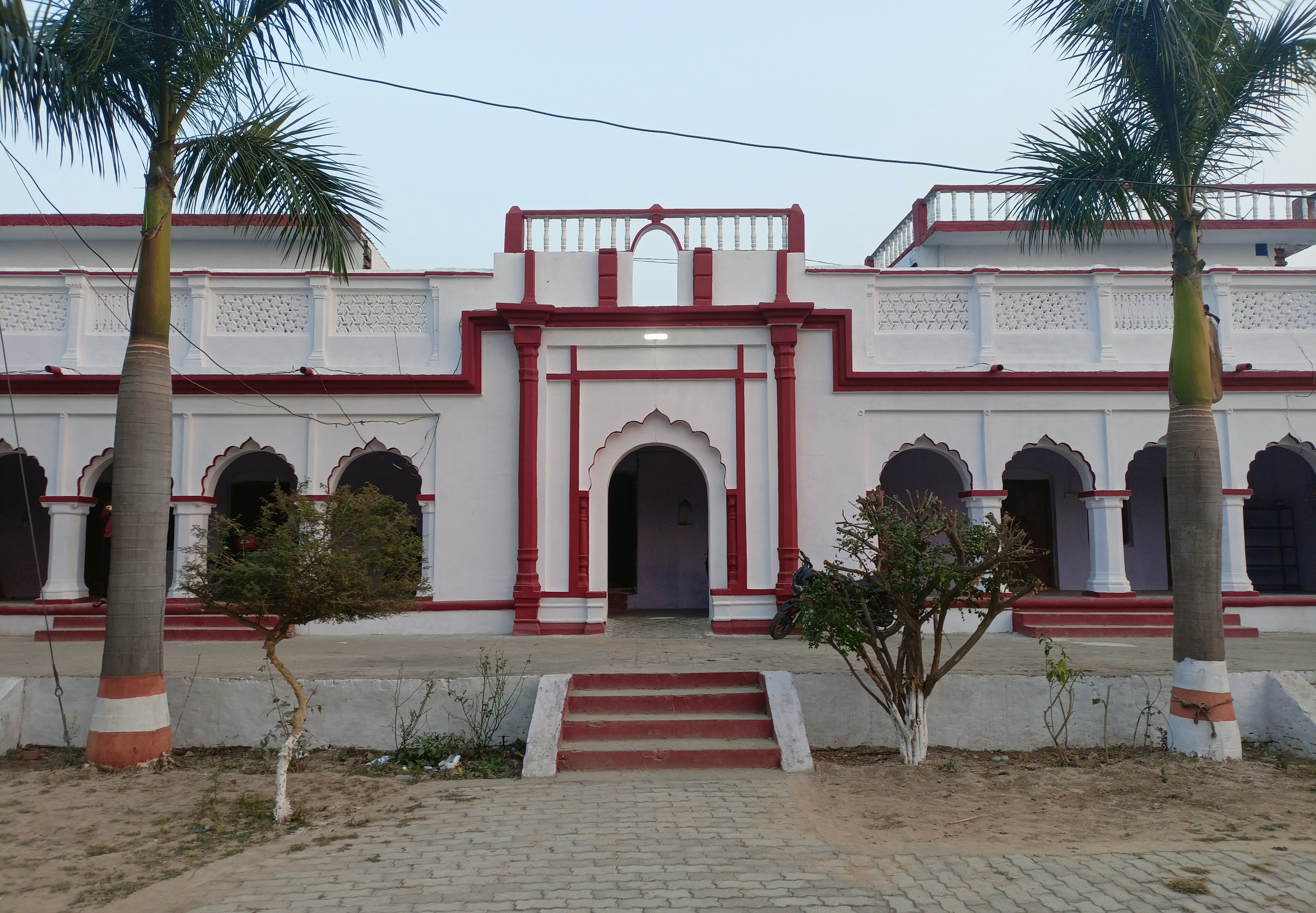
A Palace of Bandhalgoti's seat

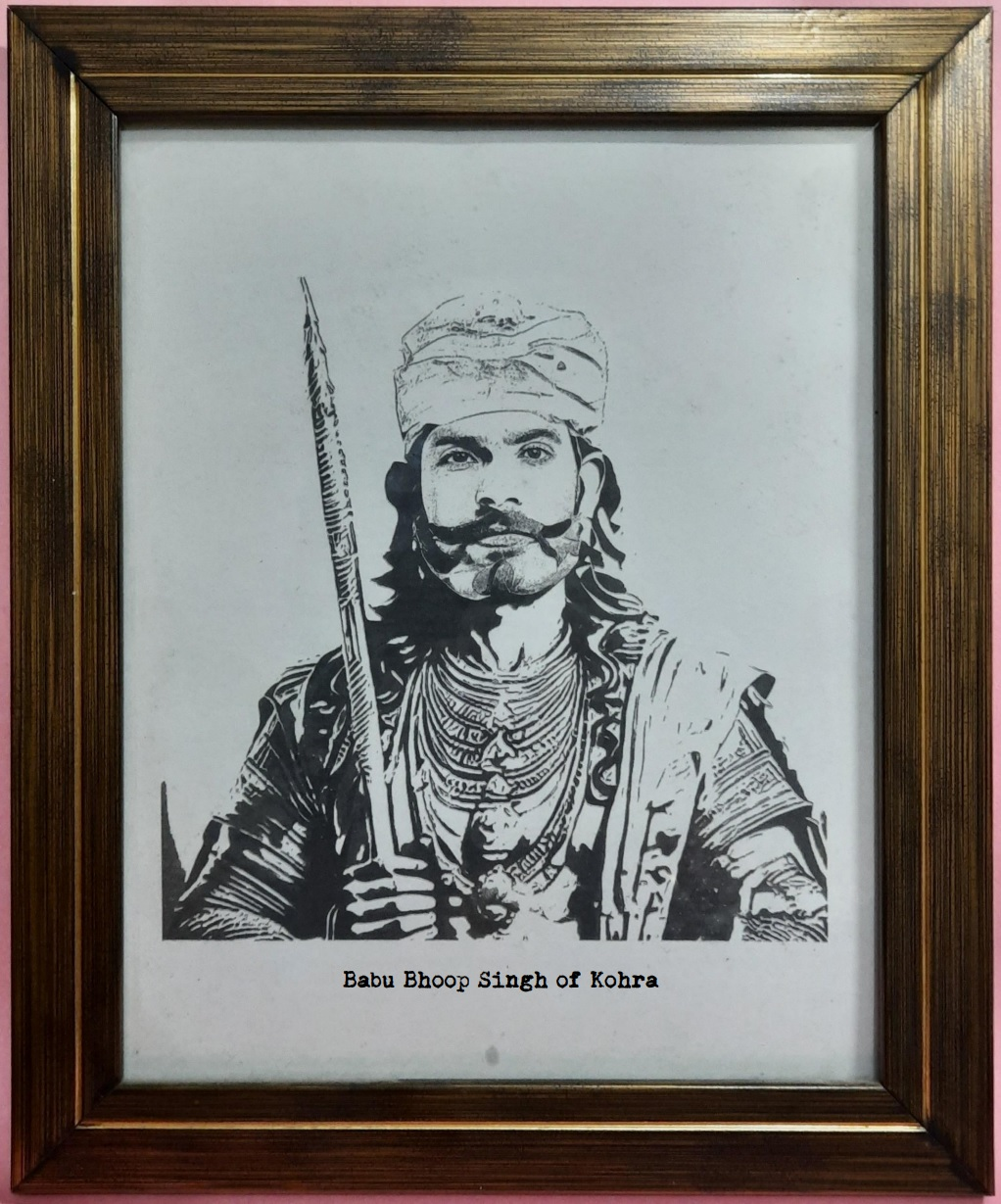
Babu Bhoop Singh, Bandhalgoti Ruler of Kohra estate.

== Branches ==
- Bikram Shahi - descendants of Raja Bikram Sah of Amethi.
- Sultan Shahi - descendants of Sultan Sah ruler of Shahgarh.

== Notable people ==
- Raja Bhagwan Baksh Singh (Ruler of Amethi)
- Raja Lal Madho Singh (Ruler of Amethi)
- Babu Himmat Sah, Founder ruler of Kohra (estate)
- Babu Bhoop Singh, Ruler of Kohra (estate) and Leader of Indian Rebellion of 1857
- Ravindra Pratap Singh, Former MP and Former MLA
- Sanjaya Sinh, Former MP and Former Cabinet Minister
- Rakesh Pratap Singh, MLA
- Deepak Singh, Former MLC

== See also ==
- Rajput clans
- Kachhwaha
