= Amethi Estate =

Taluqdari estate in Oudh

Amethi Estate अमेठी राज
- 966–1947
- Coat of arms

- Map of the Province of Oudh showing divisions and districts, including the location of Gurh Ameythee (Amethi) in British India.
- Status: Taluqdari estate
- Capital: Raipur–Phulwari (966–1743); Ramnagar (1743–1947)
- Common languages: Awadhi, Hindi
- Religion: Hinduism
- Government: Monarchy
- Raja
  - 966–1007: Raja Sodhdev (first)
  - 1891–1947: Raja Bhagwan Baksh Singh (last)
- Historical era: Medieval India
  - Established: 966
  - Accession to India: 1947

Area
- 1877: 686.35 km^{2} (265.00 sq mi)
Succeeded by
Dominion of India
- Today part of: Uttar Pradesh, Republic of India

Amethi Estate, also known as Garh Amethi emerged as a Rajput chieftaincy and pargana under the Awadh Subah, and later became a taluqdari estate situated in the Oudh region of present-day Uttar Pradesh, India. It was ruled by the Bandhalgoti clan of Rajputs.

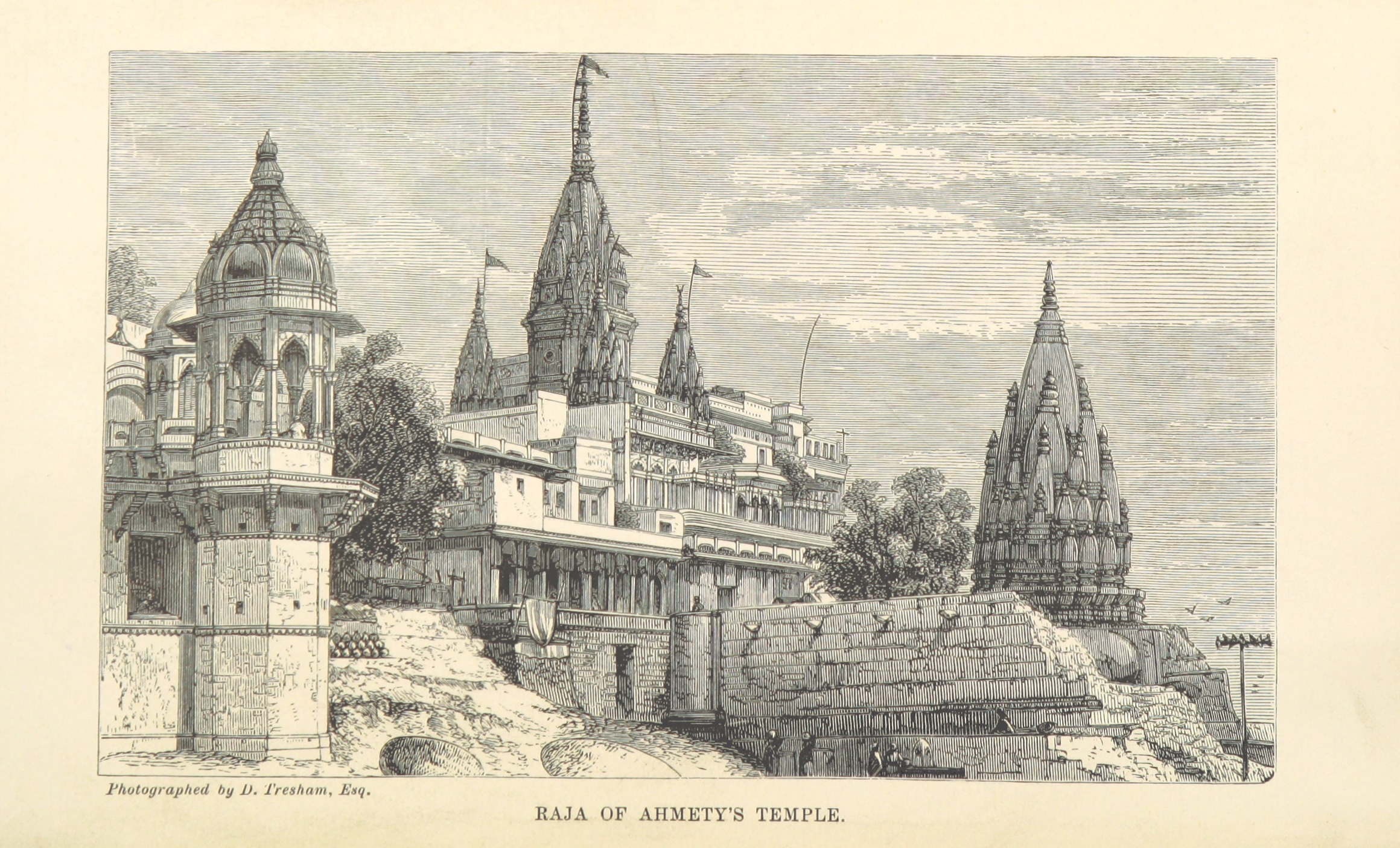
Amethi Temple at Manikarnika Ghat, Varanasi, constructed by Raja Lal Madho Singh of Amethi.

Exterior view of Bhupati Bhawan Palace, the seat of the Raja of Amethi.

== History ==
=== Early history and establishment ===
According to traditional accounts, Suda Rae, a scion of the Surajbansi house of Narwargarh (now represented by the Raja of Jaipur), left his home on a pilgrimage to Ayodhya. His route crossed the Amethi Pargana in the Sultanpur District, where he entered the service of the local Bhar chieftain. Suda Rae's administrative capabilities quickly secured his elevation to the post of minister under the Bhar chief. However, when the Bhar chief offered him his daughter in marriage, Suda Rae refused the alliance due to differences in lineage. Offended by this rejection, the Bhar chief deprived him of his office, prompting Suda Rae to return to Narwargarh. Determined to secure the territory, Suda Rae later returned with a body of followers and marched against Amethi. The Bhars were defeated with heavy casualties, allowing the Surajbansis to occupy their territory and establish control over the region. Suda Rae established a fort on the site, laying the foundation for his descendants to become hereditary lords of the territory. Additionally, records indicate that the Kachwahas under Sudha Rae Kachwaha of Narwargarh subdued the Bhars at Amethi while on a pilgrimage to Ayodhya, and were rewarded with a jagir by the Kannauj King in the Sultanpur district. Additionally, archaeological surveys document extensive (brick strewn) mounds across Tikri, Shahgarh, Bitha, and Raipur, reflecting the area's early history. While Raipur had previously served as the primary seat of the Bhar rulers before their defeat by Suda Rae, control of the region passed to the Bandhalgoti's.

=== Patronage to Malik Muhammad Jayasi ===
The history of the estate is also closely associated with the renowned Sufi poet Malik Muhammad Jayasi (born c. 1492 AD), author of the epic Padmavat, who spent the latter part of his life in seclusion in the forests of Ramnagar near Amethi under the patronage of Raja Ram Singh of Amethi. According to traditional accounts, the ruler of Amethi heard a beggar singing a song composed by Jayasi and was so charmed that he urged the poet to settle near his court. Popular folklore attributes the birth of the king's sons to Jayasi's spiritual blessings, while local traditions record that he died in 1542 AD after being accidentally killed by an armed guard or hunter of the king. He was buried at the gate of the old fort of the Raja of Amethi. Following this, the ruler ordained that Jayasi's memory be kept alive by burning a perpetual lamp at his tomb and reciting the Quran.

The tomb of 16th-century Sufi poet Malik Muhammad Jayasi located near Ram Nagar, Amethi district, Uttar Pradesh, India.

=== Mention in the Ain-i-Akbari ===
In the late 16th century, Amethi is mentioned in the Ain-i-Akbari as a mahal (pargana) under the sarkar of Lucknow within the Subah of Awadh. Compiled by Abu'l-Fazl ibn Mubarak, the text records that the settlement featured a brick fort and was held by the Bandhalgoti Rajputs. During this period, the administration assessed the revenue of the Amethi mahal at 1,800,000 dāms, with the local force consisting of 250 cavalry, 5,500 infantry, and 8 elephants.

=== Resistance against the Nawab of Awadh ===
In June 1737, during the absence of Nawab Saadat Khan Burhan-ul-Mulk from Awadh (who was attending matters in Delhi), twenty Rajput chiefs probably Raja Gurudatt Singh of Amethi and Raja Nawal Singh of Tiloi formed a confederacy to resist Awadh's authority and committed excesses in the southern districts of the province. In response to news of the uprising, the Nawab dispatched his son-in-law, Abulmansur Khan (later Safdar Jang), equipped with 12,000 cavalry and a powerful artillery force to suppress the rebellion. Abulmansur Khan initially penetrated into the heart of the southern rebel territory, marching directly towards Tiloi and capturing several redoubts in its vicinity.

However, while engaged in these operations, Abulmansur Khan learned that the allied confederate forces were concentrating their armies at the Amethi Fort, situated approximately 26 miles southeast of Tiloi. Despite the confederates' attempt to draw the besiegers away by marching towards Amethi in the rear of Khan's army to relieve pressure on Tiloi, Abulmansur Khan refused to be outmaneuvered and reached Amethi on 12 June 1737. Within twenty-four hours, he completed arrangements for a regular investment of the fort.

The Amethi Fort was a large and formidable stronghold capable of housing an army of 20,000 cavalry within its wooded shelter, surrounded by a deep, wide ditch and protected by an extensive, dense outer jungle of thorny bushes and babul (acacia) trees. The besieged forces mounted a stout resistance for sixteen days, but Abulmansur Khan's heavy artillery reduced the defenders to great straits. On the night of 28 June 1737, the confederate chiefs evacuated the fort under cover of darkness, allowing the deputy governor's men to occupy the stronghold the following day, after which it was destroyed.

The siege resulted in considerable losses on both sides, as recorded by contemporary chronicler Sayyid Muhammad Bilgrami. Notably, Mir Muhammad Muhsin an officer in the Nawab's army, won high recognition for conspicuous bravery during the campaign, while another officer, Sayyid-Al-Rasul, was struck in the calf of his leg on the first day of the siege and died three days later, being buried on the bank of a tank near Amethi Fort.

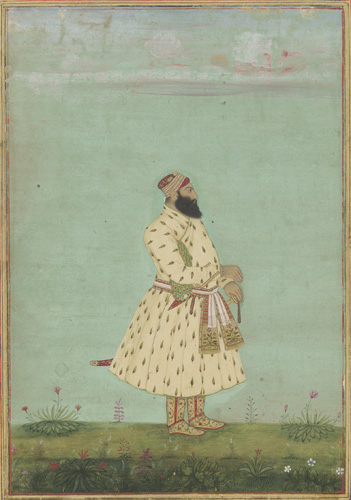
Abulmansur Khan (Safdar Jang), who later became the Nawab of the Kingdom of Awadh, led the army during the 1737 siege of Amethi Fort.

=== Amethi in the 1857 Revolt under Raja Lal Madho Singh ===
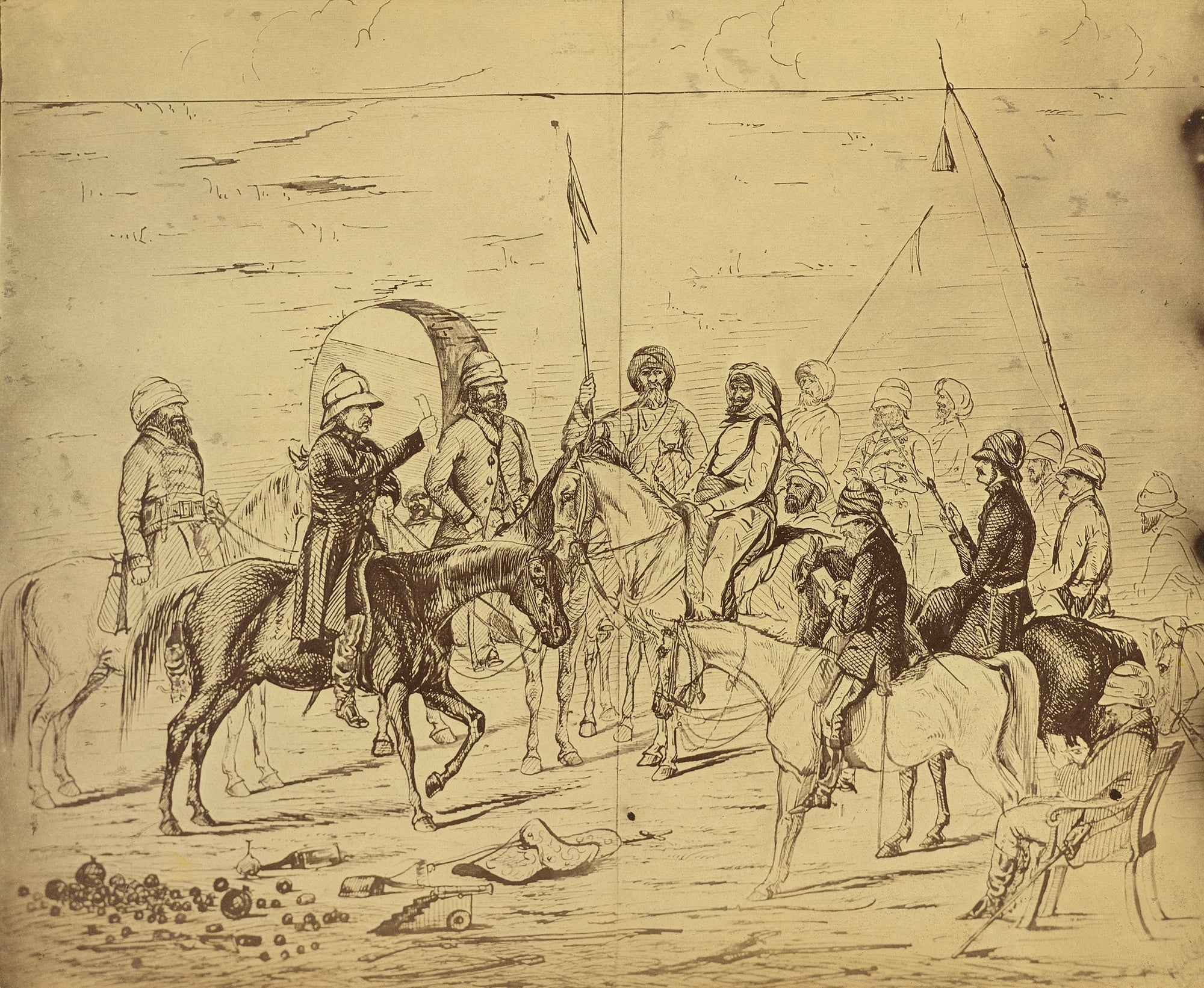
A sketch by Henry Hope Crealock depicting the Siege of the Fort of Amethi during the Byswarra Campaign in November 1858.

During the 1857 uprising, Raja Lal Madho Singh emerged as a prominent military commander, actively driving armed resistance across multiple strategic theaters. After bringing troops into Lucknow, he was entrusted by Begum Hazrat Mahal to direct operations in the Banni and Alambagh sectors, leading frontline combat against European units stationed between Dilkusha and the Baillie Guard. His active military engagements included deploying a force to Bani Banthara to intercept an advancing detachment from Kanpur, alongside reinforcing the Alambagh defensive lines at Fateh Ali pond. A major highlight of his mobilization efforts took place at the Sultanpur assembly, where he worked strenuously to gather and sustain a massive field army consisting of 6,700 regular sepoys, 8,900 local levies, 1,500 cavalry, and 11 artillery pieces to check the advancement of British columns. He also engaged advancing Gurkha troops in direct combat. Within his primary stronghold at the Fort of Ramnagar in Amethi, he maintained a heavily armed garrison of 10,000 soldiers. When British forces under Lord Clyde besieged the fortress in November 1858, Lal Madho Singh executed a tactical ruse by entering the enemy camp to offer his personal surrender. This maneuver bought critical time, allowing his entire garrison to evacuate smoothly under the cover of darkness and dense jungle to join Rana Beni Madho's forces before the stronghold was captured and destroyed.

Raja Lal Madho Singh Bahadur of Amethi, one of the prominent leaders of the 1857 revolt from Oudh.

== List of Rulers ==
Rulers of Garh Amethi

- Raja Bikram Shah
- Raja Sujan Shah
- Raja Dalip Shah
- Raja Tej Singh
- Raja Jai Singh
- Raja Ajab Singh
- Raja Pahar Singh
- Raja Himmat Shah
- Raja Gurdutt Singh (d. after 1743)
- Raja Drigpal Singh (d. 1798)
- Raja Har Chand Singh (r. –1810)
- Raja Dalpat Shah (r. 1810–1815)
- Raja Bisheshwar Singh (r. 1815–1842)
- Raja Madho Singh (r. 1842–1891)
- Raja Bhagwan Baksh Singh (r. 1891–1962)
- Raja Rananjay Singh (r. 1962–1988)
- Raja Sanjay Singh (r. 1988–present)

=== Other family members ===
- Garima Singh
- Ameeta Singh

== See also ==
- Amethi
- Amethi Temple
