= Amethi =

Town in Uttar Pradesh, India

- City
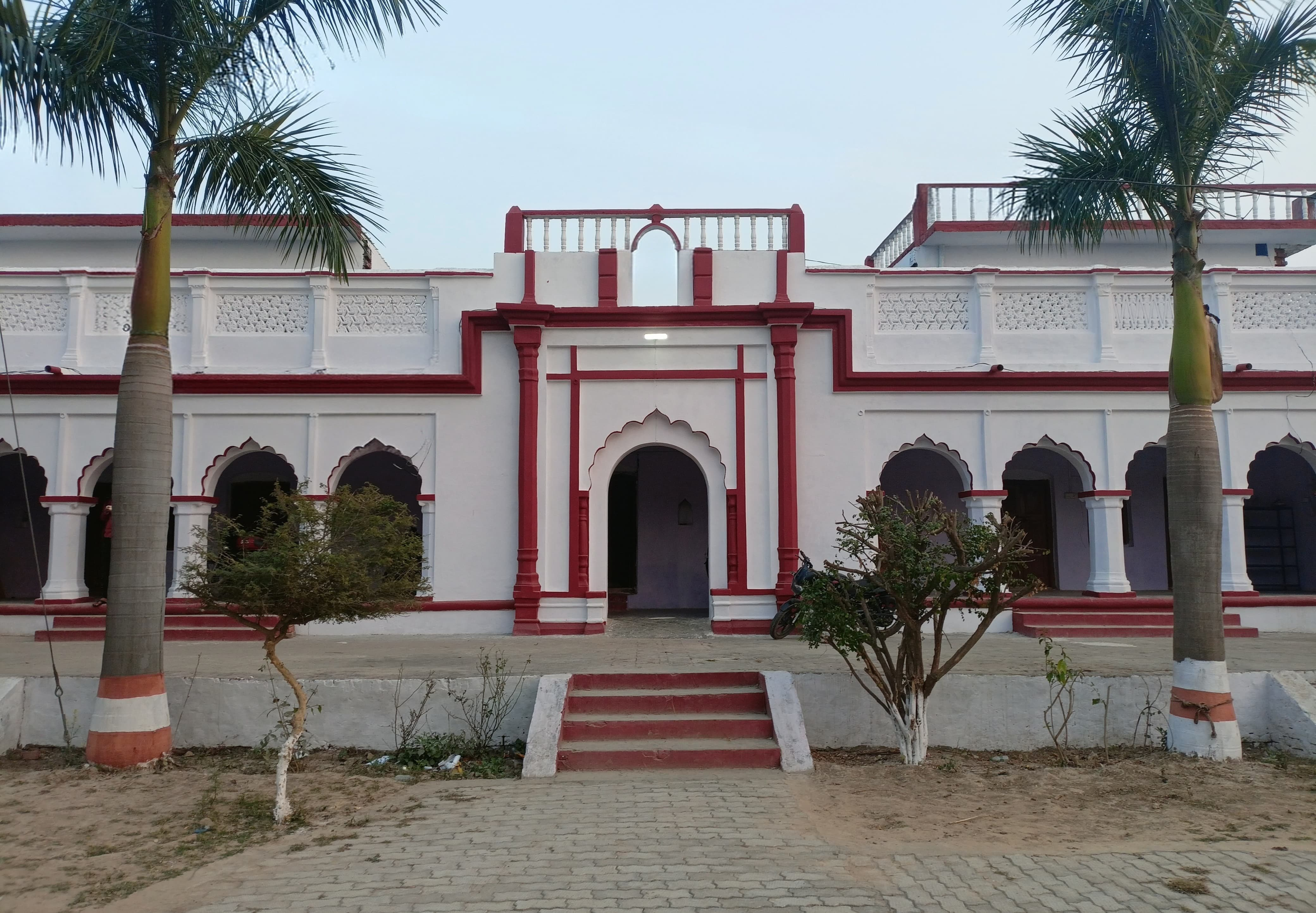
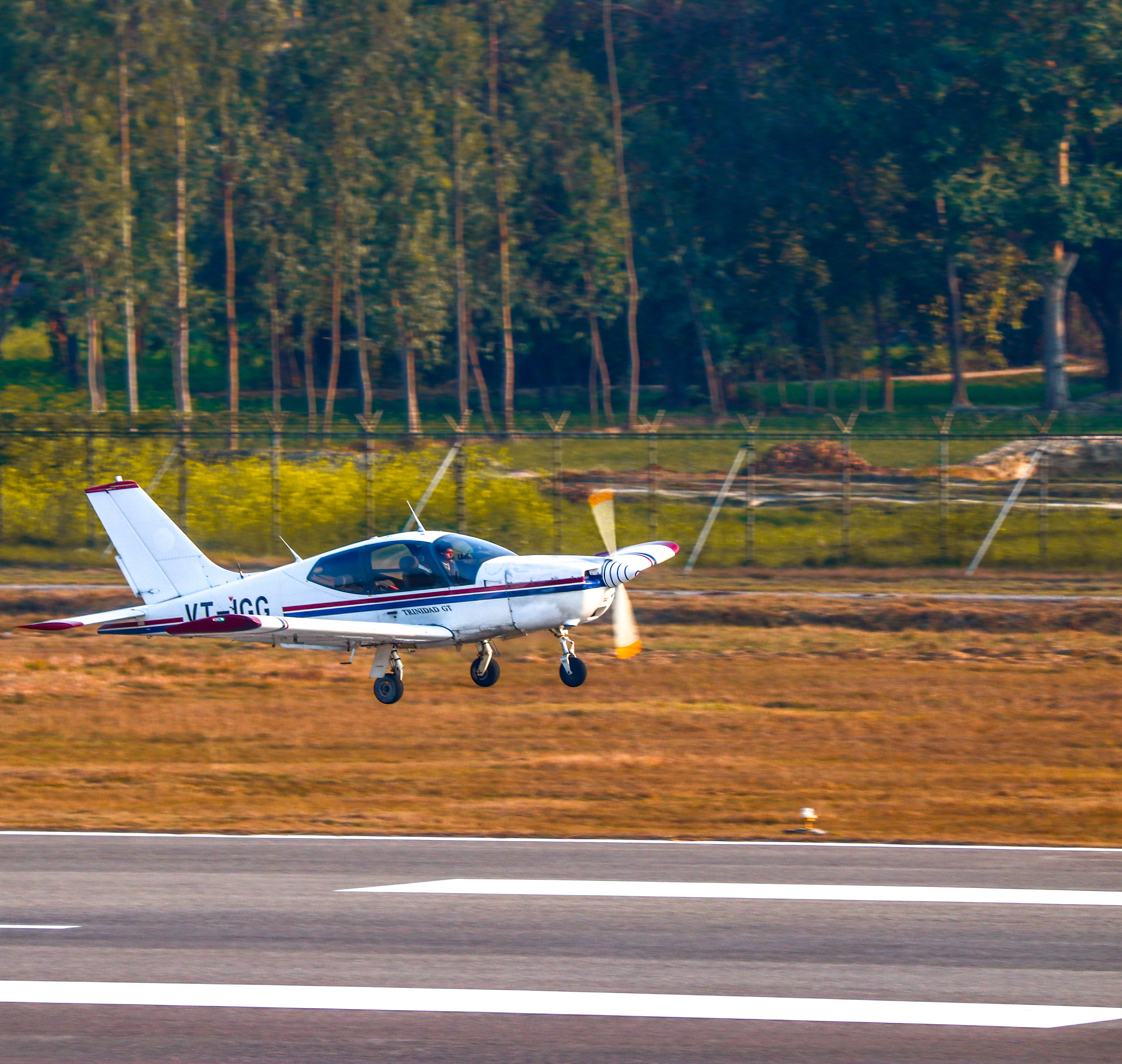
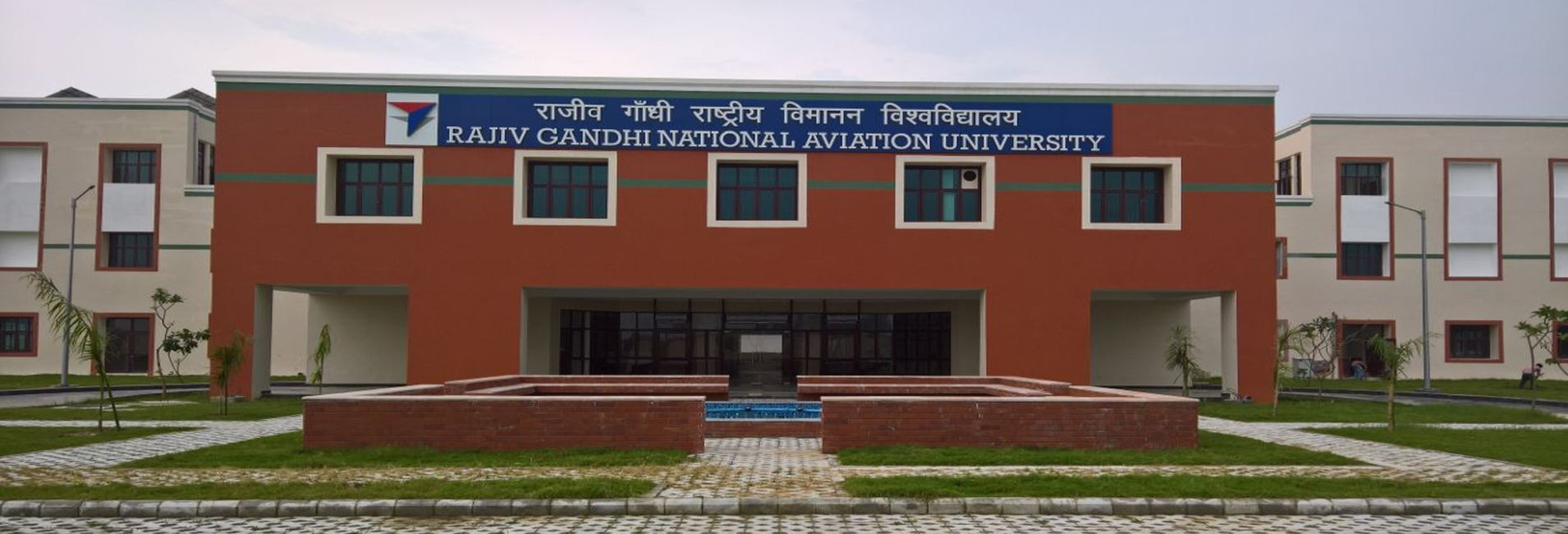
- Palace of Kohra (estate) IGRUA RGIPT Rajiv Gandhi National Aviation University
- Interactive map of Amethi
- Location in Uttar Pradesh, India Amethi (India) Amethi (Asia) Amethi (Earth)
- Coordinates: 26.155°N 81.809°E
- Country: India
- State: Uttar Pradesh
- Division: Ayodhya
- Region: Awadh
- District: Amethi
- District Formation: 1 July 2010; 16 years ago
- Headquarters: Gauriganj

Government
  - Body: Government of Uttar Pradesh
  - MP(Lok Sabha): Kishori Lal Sharma
  - DM: Nisha Anant, IAS
  - SP: Anoop Kumar Singh, IPS

Area
  - Total: 0.72 km^{2} (0.28 sq mi)
- Elevation: 100 m (330 ft)

Population (2011)
  - Total: 13,849
  - Density: 19,000/km^{2} (50,000/sq mi)

Languages
  - Official: Hindi
  - Additional official: Urdu
  - Regional: Awadhi
  - Literacy (2011): 59.14
- Time zone: UTC+5:30 (IST)
- PIN: 227405
- Telephone code: +915368
- Vehicle registration: UP-36
- Sex ratio: 908 females per 1000 males ♂/♀
- Airport: Fursatganj Airfield
- Website: amethi.nic.in

Amethi is a city situated in the Indian state of Uttar Pradesh. Gauriganj is the administrative headquarters of the Amethi district. This district is a part of Ayodhya division in the Awadh region of the state. Amethi was 72nd district of Uttar Pradesh which came into existence on 1 July 2010 by merging three tehsils of the erstwhile Sultanpur district namely Amethi, Gauriganj and Musafirkhana and two tehsils of the erstwhile Raebareli district, namely, Salon and Tiloi. The town is part of the Amethi Lok Sabha constituency and Amethi Assembly constituency, which became reputed as a stronghold of the Indian National Congress party. The Congress leaders belonging to Nehru-Gandhi family won several elections from Amethi during 1980–2014. In 2019, Smriti Irani of Bhartiya Janta Party won this seat. Irani was defeated in 2024 by Kishori Lal Sharma of Indian National Congress.

== History ==
In the past, Amethi used to be called Raipur-Amethi. When the train station was built here, it took the name of Amethi, but before then there had been no settlement with that exact name. There had been a mahal or pargana of Amethi since at least the time of Akbar: it is mentioned in the Ain-i-Akbari as belonging to the sarkar of Lucknow, with a brick fort at headquarters and was held by Rajputs called "Bahmangoti"s, who are the same as the Bandhalgoti Rajputs from whom the Rajas of Amethi originated. Later on, the pargana was transferred to Manikpur.

The capital region of the Amethi Estate , Raipur, which was formerly known as Badagaon, lost much of its power, strength, and splendor after the establishment of the Kohra (estate) by Babu Himmat Sah. He was the younger son of Raja Bikram Sah of Amethi estate. His descendant, Babu Bhoop Singh, became one of the most important leaders in the Indian Rebellion of 1857 and played a crucial role in the Awadh War of 1857.

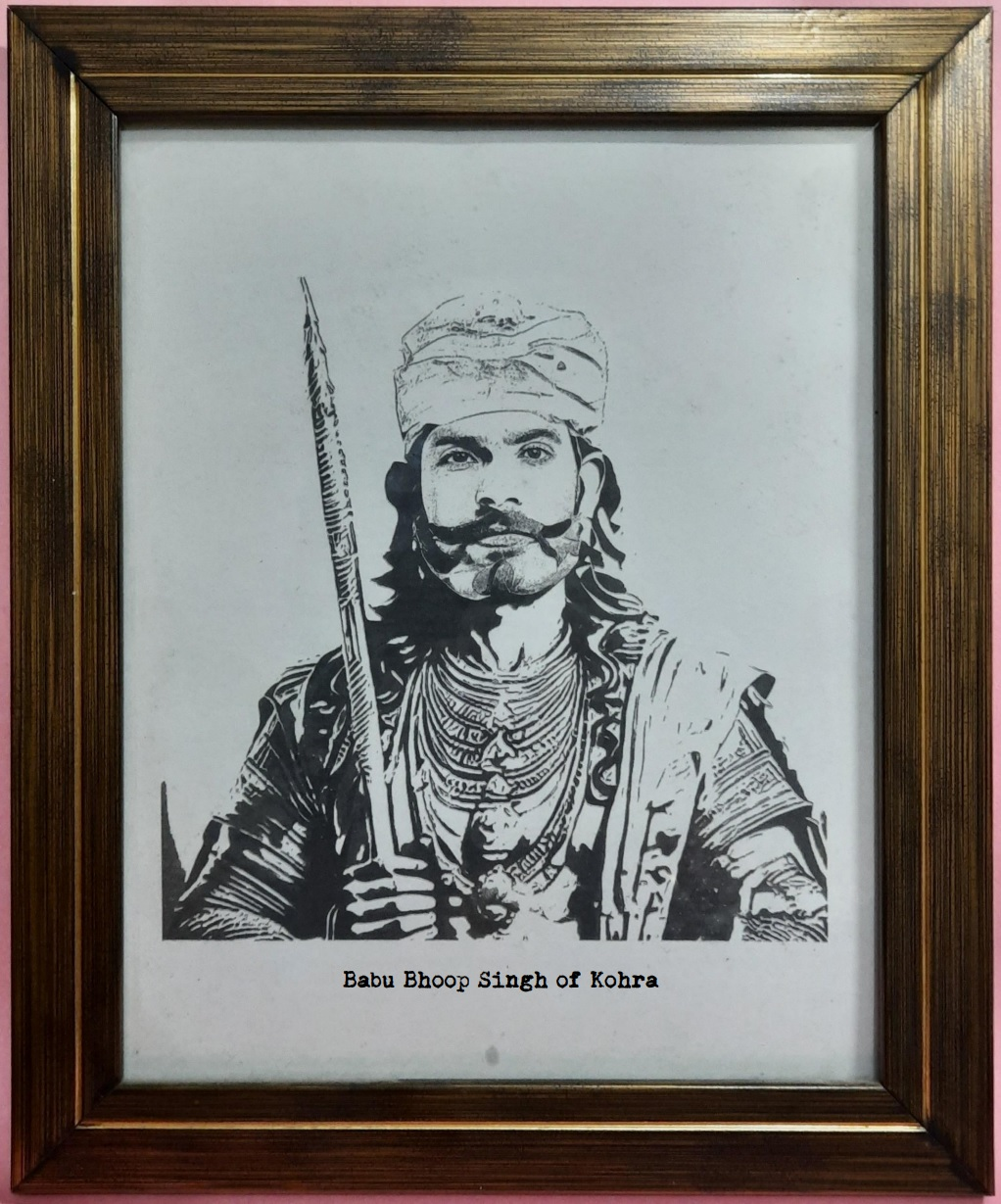
Babu Bhoop Singh of Kohra (estate), Leader in the Indian Rebellion of 1857

=== The Rajas of Amethi ===
The Bandhalgoti Kachhwaha Rajas of Amethi originally resided at Raipur Phulwari, which along with Sarwanpur and Katra Himmat Singh, was one of the three villages that would later be amalgamated into the modern town of Raipur-Amethi. The old fort at Raipur Phulwari was destroyed by Safdar Jang c. 1743; its ruins are still visible today.

The story behind its destruction is as follows: the King of Amethi Raja Gurdatt Singh had defied Safdar Jang's authority so conspicuously that Safdar Jang personally led an army to Raipur to besiege the fort.

After a siege of 18 days, Gurdatt Singh fled into the neighbouring jungle of Ramnagar (which became the rajas' main residence), and the fort was destroyed and his estate (then known as Udiawan, until the British annexation of Awadh) put under Safdar Jang's direct control.

Raja Gurdatt Singh's son Raja Drigpal Singh was able to recover his father's estate. While Raja Gurdatt Singh had been known by various titles, all his successors beginning with Drigpal Singh were unequivocally styled Raja. Because of the prevalence of barren usar land in the pargana, there was a popular saying "gar na hota Amethi úsar, Rája hota deota dusar", meaning "if there had been no usar in Amethi, the Raja would be a second deity".

The taluqa was then divided between Drigpal Singh's two sons, with Har Chand Singh receiving the bulk of the inheritance and Jai Chand Singh founding the junior branch of Kannu Kasrawan. Har Chand Singh had originally inherited 153 villages but in 1804 was permitted to engage for the entire pargana of Amethi (except for the village of Raghipur). In 1810, this arrangement was changed by Saadat Ali Khan II, leaving Har Chand Singh with just 43 rent-free villages; he abdicated in favour of his son Dalpat Sah, who in 1813 was able to restore the taluqa to its original extent. Dalpat Sah died in 1815 and was succeeded by his son Bisheshar Singh, who then died childless in 1842.

At this point, the taluqa was inherited by Bisheshar Singh's cousin Madho Singh, whose father Arjun Singh (Dalpat's brother) had held the independent Gangoli estate as a junior branch. Under Madho Singh, these two branches became united. Madho Singh clashed with the nazim of Sultanpur, Maharaja Man Singh, in 1845; when this proved indecisive, the two parties turned to negotiations. The resulting agreement in 1846 ended up leasing the entire pargana to Madho Singh except for a few villages that would be directly retained by the nazim.

This lease included Kannu Kasrawan, still held by Jai Chand Singh's descendants, but the proprietors ignored the terms and Madho Singh ended up getting a decree of confiscation from the Nawab of Awadh himself. After protracted fighting the proprietors finally submitted in 1853.

The Udiawan taluqa was almost completely broken up upon the British annexation in 1856, but reconstituted after the 1857 uprising. Madho Singh supported the rebellion but the British were still willing to give him a sanad for the estate; they also formally acknowledged his title of Raja (he had never really sought formal recognition beforehand). Madho died in August 1891, shortly after the death of his only son, and was succeeded by a more distant relative who was adopted as his heir. At the turn of the 20th century, the Amethi Estate consisted of 314 villages and 4 pattis, all in the pargana of Amethi.

=== Growth of the modern town ===
Amethi's development as a major town is because of the coming of the railway. As late as 1897, a British settlement officer wrote "Raipur is a collection of small unimportant hamlets, with positively no attempt at trade." That changed when the Oudh and Rohilkhand Railway came to town with a station in 1898. The town then rapidly grew in size and commercial importance, and as early as 1903 it was already described as "a flourishing town" and the previous description was described as "already ancient history".

As of 1901 the population was 3,688 including 1,127 Muslims which was an especially large proportion for the area. It contained the tehsil headquarters, a school, a police station, a pound, and a dispensary.

Raipur is the place where the first fort of Bandhalgoti Rajas was located. His ancestors used to reside in Raipur which is now Raipur Phulwari. New fort was built in Ram Nagar about 6 km (3.7 mi) north of present Amethi which had been Center of Political activities during freedom movement. It is inhabited by Ex MP Sanjaya Sinh and Ex MLA Garima Singh. Amethi became known worldwide with Sanjay Gandhi contesting Parliamentary Election on the behest of Raja Rananjay Singh who had close relationship with Nehru family. It is also famous for the Hanuman temple called (Hanumangarhi) and a mosque both built about hundred years ago. About 7 kilometres north of Amethi there is a tomb of famous Poet Malik Muhammad Jayasi (best remembered for his epic composition Padmavat) at Magravan which is near Ram Nagar, where he died. Present fort was built by Bandhalgoti Rajas.

== Demographics ==
Historical population
Year	Pop.	±%
1981	7,132	—
1991	10,661	+49.5%
2001	12,836	+20.4%
2011	13,849	+7.9%
Source: 2011 Census of India

According to the 2011 census, Amethi has a population of 13,849 people, in 2,262 households. The town's sex ratio is 965 females to every 1000 males; 7,049 of Amethi's residents are male (50.9%) and 6,800 are female (49.1%). The 0-6 age group numbered 1,731, or about 12.5% of the town's population; the sex ratio for this group was 987. Members of Scheduled Castes make up 12.87% of the town's population, while no members of Scheduled Tribes were recorded. Amethi's literacy rate was 78.3% (counting only people age 7 and up); literacy was higher among men and boys (86.01%) than among women and girls (70.27%). The scheduled castes literacy rate is 60.73% (71.95% among men and boys, and 48.25% among women and girls).

In terms of employment, 21.29% of Amethi residents were classified as main workers (i.e. people employed for at least 6 months per year) in 2011. Marginal workers (i.e. people employed for less than 6 months per year) made up 6.27%, and the remaining 72.44% were non-workers. Employment status varied significantly according to gender, with 44.76% of men being either main or marginal workers, compared to only 9.74% of women.

As per the 2001 Census of India, Amethi had a population of 12,808. Males constitute 52% of the population and females 48%. Amethi has an average literacy rate of 59%, lower than the national average of 59.5%; with 59% of the males and 41% of females literate. 17% of the population is under 6 years of age.

== Transport ==
Amethi is connected to major cities in Uttar Pradesh and North-Eastern India via Indian Railways and roads. Amethi railway station has direct trains connecting with major cities like Jammu, Amritsar, Ambala, Delhi, Lucknow, Kanpur, Dehradun, Haridwar, Jaipur, Prayagraj, Varanasi, Patna, Kolkata, Puri, Bhopal, Mumbai and Bangalore.

A number of Uttar Pradesh State Road Transport Corporation buses play from Amethi.

Ayodhya International Airport (84 km [52 mi]) and Prayagraj Airport (104 km [65 mi] are the nearby airports from Amethi.

== Institutions, industries and organisations ==
- Rajiv Gandhi Institute of Petroleum Technology
- Rajiv Gandhi National Aviation University
- Indira Gandhi Rashtriya Uran Akademi
- Footwear Design and Development Institute
- Ranveer Ranjanay Post Graduate College
- Shri Shiv Pratap Inter College
- Mahatma Shiv Kumar Inter College

A few public sector units were established in Amethi in the 1970s, however not much has occurred in the town for the past two decades, leading to young people leaving in search of jobs. Society for Animal Health Agriculture Science and Humanity is a national non-profit organisation located in Munshiganj, Amethi. Amethi has the Avionics Division of Hindustan Aeronautics Limited, the organisation responsible for the manufacture of Aircraft for the Indian Airforce. One Ordnance Factory was established in 2009 by the Congress Government to manufacture small arms and weapons.

A joint venture between India and Russia through Kalashnikov Concern and the Ordnance Factory Board has established a rifle factory in Amethi, and in 2023 Indian Army started using rifles made at this facility.

== Villages ==
Amethi CD block has the following 86 villages:

Village name	Total land area (hectares)	Population (in 2011)
Trilokpur	167.3	2,062
Teri	162	832
Katra Maharani	134.4	1,236
Lokipur	52.7	623
Matyar Baghaura	49.5	481
Dandupur	134.4	1,001
Bhupatipur	85.7	629
Ramdaypur	130.2	1,441
Naugawa	125.6	647
Banhapur	86.3	978
Jangal Ramnagar	1,198.2	10,843
Saray Khema	557	4,489
Ramnagar Mafi	78.7	233
Mahmoodpur	226.9	3,154
Marfapur	38.1	303
Balipur	34.5	329
Benipur	128.3	1,438
Ramnathpur	24.4	367
Parsanwa	301.7	1,622
Bhaganpur	151	981
Jangal Tikari	68.9	581
Tala	181.4	1,626
Loharta	51.2	776
Ahirawal	67.8	406
Sonpur Mankhanth	79.9	855
Darkha	277.8	1,735
Sundar Pur	107.5	725
Haripur	51.6	233
Kushitali	127.3	1,342
Umapur Gana Patti	382.7	2,258
Katra Hulasi	55.7	517
Nuwanwa	456.9	2,861
Mangal Pur	62.2	304
Bariya Pur	274.1	1,336
Korari Girdhar Shah	386.3	2,603
Mochwa	166.1	982
Saraiheermati	98	569
Chaturbhuj Pur	119.4	1,400
Ghawnie	43.4	627
Sultanpur	112.2	617
Pithi Pur	147	746
Ghaghu Ghar	133.6	632
Raipur Phulwari	278.5	2,208
Loniyapur	110.5	1,339
Bharti Pur	38.1	382
Katra Raja Himmat Singh	80	0
Ray Day Pur	105.8	859
Sarvan Pur	123.3	2,344
Sarai Rajshah	68.3	268
Parsauli	134.1	964
Katra Phool Kunwar	175.1	1,524
Jagi Patti	118.7	322
Hathkila	216.7	1,907
Baghvariya	87.2	306
Kherauna	169.5	1,870
Chachka Pur	59.5	819
Birahim Pur	71.2	490
Rebha	99.6	642
Manipur Raghau	57.7	141
Mandhar Patti	22.6	171
Gyan Chandra Pur	60.1	555
Mahson	86.1	1,020
Jairam Pur	108.9	801
Jamal Patti	104.6	483
Deohapsaar	314.4	2,544
Gareri	268.8	3,146
Gangauli	375	2,072
Bhushari	235.1	1,638
Himmatgarh	390.9	1,715
Ramgarh	685.2	3,877
Nainha	182.4	1,290
Bartali	93.3	640
Rajapur Kohra	153.5	1,226
Kudwan Mahmadpur	66.5	611
Dehra	233.6	2,488
Saidpur	100.4	1,103
Aghar	213.3	1,495
Maharajpur	164.4	1,276
Biyasiya	200.6	1,536
Kakwa	367.9	3,044
Dalashah Pur	81.4	518
Kohra	577.1	4,407
Mahmad Pur	447.8	3,665
Saraiya Duban	301.9	1,823
Naraini	584.6	5,082
Purabgaon	222.2	1,546
Block total	123,577	15,954.3
Village name	Total land area (hectares)	Population (in 2011)

== Notable people ==
- Chandrama Devi Agrahari
- Rahul Gandhi (MP)
- Rajiv Gandhi (former Prime Minister of India)
- Sanjay Gandhi (former MP)
- Smriti Irani (former MP and former cabinet minister)
- Malik Muhammad Jayasi (poet, writer)
- Leela Mishra (Indian actress)
- Manoj Muntashir (lyricist)
- Mohammad Muslim (Former MLA)
- Rakesh Pandey (writer and author)
- Suresh Pasi (MLA and former minister)
- Jagdish Piyush (writer, educationist, Indian National Congress politician)
- Gayatri Prasad Prajapati (former MLA and former cabinet minister)
- Maharaji Prajapati (MLA)
- Syed Sibtey Razi (former Governor of Assam, former Governor of Jharkhand, former MP)
- Babu Himmat Sah (Founder ruler of Kohra (estate))
- Kishori Lal Sharma (MP)
- Govind Narayan Shukla (MLC)
- Akshay Pratap Singh (MLC and former MP)
- Ameeta Singh (former MLA)
- Babu Bhoop Singh (Ruler of Kohra (estate) and leader of the Indian Rebellion of 1857)
- Deepak Singh (former MLC)
- Garima Singh (former MLA)
- Pankaj Singh (Indian cricketer)
- Raja Lal Madho Singh (Ruler of Amethi Estate)
- Rakesh Pratap Singh (MLA)
- Ravindra Pratap Singh (former MP and former MLA)
- Rudra Pratap Singh (former MP, former MLA and former MLC)
- Mayankeshwar Sharan Singh (MLA and minister)
- Raja Bhagwan Baksh Singh (Ruler of Amethi Estate)
- Shailendra Pratap Singh (MLC)
- Tejbhan Singh (Former MLA)
- Sanjaya Sinh (former MP and former cabinet minister)
- Prashant Veer (Indian cricketer)
