= Babu Himmat Sah =

Ruler of Kohra

- Rajkumar of Amethi; Babu of Kohra

1st Bandhalgoti Ruler of Kohra
- Reign: 17th century
- Predecessor: Position established
- Born: Amethi, Oudh
- House: Bandhalgoti
- Dynasty: Kachhwaha
- Father: Raja Bikram Sah
- Religion: Hinduism

Babu Himmat Sah was the founder and the first ruler of the Kohra (estate) in the Awadh region of northern India (now located in Amethi district, Uttar Pradesh, India). He belonged to the Bandhalgoti clan of Rajputs and was the younger son of Raja Bikram Sah, the then ruler of Amethi.

He established Kohra on the occasion of Ganga Dussehra in 1636. As part of the foundation of the estate, he built temple dedicated to Lord Chaturbhuj, which became the earliest religious and cultural center of the region. Later, this place played a crucial role in the estate's participation during the revolt of 1857. Following the religious establishment, he constructed the Kohra Fort, which became the seat of power for the estate. It was within this fort that he was formally crowned as the first ruler of Kohra, marking the beginning of its prominence in the political landscape of Awadh. The fort later evolved into the political and military stronghold of the estate, from where his successors administered their territories and maintained their influence in the region.

== See also ==
- Kohra (estate)
- Amethi
