= Narwar Fort =

Fort in Madhya Pradesh, India

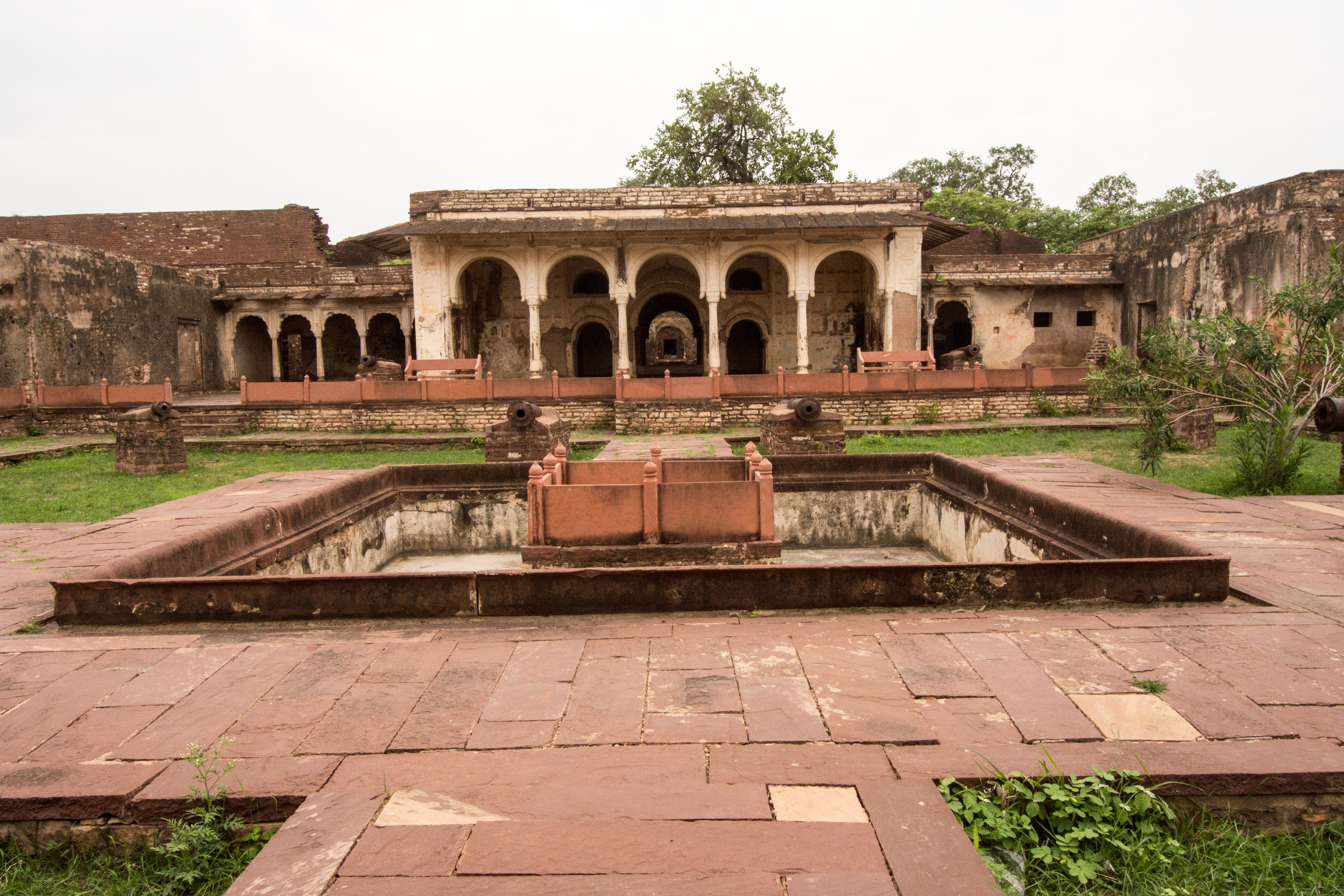
Narwar Fort

Narwar Fort is situated atop a hill, at Narwar in Shivpuri district of Madhya Pradesh, about 500 feet above ground level spread over an area of 8 km^{2}, which stands on a steep scarp of the Vindhya Range. Kushwaha are said to have built (or rebuilt) the fort when they occupied Narwar in the 10th century. Kachwaha Rajput, Pratihara Rajput, and Tomara Rajputs held Narwar successively from 12th century onwards, until its capture by the Malwa Sultanate in the 14th century, and later served as feudal state till 1808. The fort's layout spans nearly 8 km² and features a network of palaces, courtyards, and religious structures, many of which showcase Rajput and Mughal architectural influences. Among its notable features is the Chhip Mahal, which incorporates reused temple pillars and remains a symbol of layered historical legacies.

== History ==
According to local tradition and medieval inscriptions, Narwar, then called Nalapura was established by Raja Nala of Mahabharata fame and later rebuilt by the Kachwaha Rajputs in the 10th century. From the 12th century onwards, it was successively ruled by the Parihara and Tomara Rajputs until its capture by the Mughals in the 16th century, and subsequently by the Maratha Scindia clan in the early 19th century. Folklore recounts how Raja Nala's wife Damayanti magically guarded the treasury entrance as Pasardevi, a turtle goddess, a narrative that underpins the devotional traditions at the fort's gate even today. During Sikandar Lodi's reign in the early 16th century, all Hindu structures were destroyed and repurposed in Mughal construction, notably reflected in the reuse of temple pillars within the "Chhip Mahal".

== Architecture ==
Narwar Fort was situated atop a 500‑ft-high Vindhya Range, the fort spans approximately 8 km², with its perimeter walls encompassing a layout resembles a duck, comprising central (Majh Mahal), northern (Madar Hata), south-eastern (Dulha Kot), and southern (Gurjar Ahata) quarters. The fort's internal divisions (ahata/dhola ahata) are formed by crosswalls, housing palaces such as Chhip Mahal, Hawa Paur Mahal, Koriyon ki Haveli, Phulwa Mahal, Kacheri Mahal, and religious monuments like the Sikh-era Sikandar Lodi mosque. Structures exhibit traditional Rajput design with flat ceilings, fluted columns, and multifold arches. Interiors were once richly painted and embellished with glass beads. The Chhip Mahal, built with carved pillars from an 11th-century Hindu temple.
