= Taluqdar =

Aristocrats of ancient India

Taluqdars or Talukdars (Bengali: তালুকদার, Hindustani: तालुक़दार/تعلقدار ta'lluqdār; taluq Arabic: تعلق "estate" + dar Persian: دار "owner") were aristocrats who formed the ruling class during the Delhi Sultanate, Bengal Sultanate, Mughal Empire, and British Raj. They were owners of a vast amount of land, consistently hereditary, and had revenue and judicial powers.

Being powerful peers, similar to those of Europe in the Middle Ages, after the decline of the Mughal state the Taluqdaris were to withstand the revenue collectors of the Colonial Powers while also bringing given number of villages under their dominion, and thus, according to many historians, the rapid development and enhancing power and wealth of the Taluqdaris during the early 19th century caused tremendous difficulties and concerns to the British East India Company. The majority of the Taluqdaris constructed themselves enormous mud fortified towers throughout tropical forests and maintained immense bodies of armed affinities.

The Taluqdars of Oudh were baronial, with some representing the ancient families. In other cases, the historical equivalent in Britain is similar to a member of the landed aristocracy, or perhaps a lord of the manor. In contemporary usage, the term is often regarded as a noble tribe and clan, although it may convey some diverse meanings in different parts of the Indian subcontinent. It is mentioned that throughout Oudh till Bihar, there was a presence of large numbers of Rajput Taluqdars, and they played an important role in 1857 in the region.

== Types of Taluqdars ==
1. A hereditary owner of one or more Taluqas (land-tax jurisdictions) or an imperial tax collector with administrative power over a district of several villages in Punjab, Rajasthan, East Bengal (presently Bangladesh), and the rest of North India/United Provinces. These kinds of Taluqdars were manorial and often had both forts and military forces of their own, especially in Oudh, where they were known as barons. Before the British annexation of the Kingdom of Oudh, the larger Taluqdars of this type in the region had occupied a position that amounted to virtual independence.
2. An official and civil servant in Hyderabad State during the British colonial era, equivalent to a magistrate and tax collector.
3. A landholder with peculiar tenures in various other parts of British India.
4. Independent rulers of smaller states who exercised sovereign authority over their subjects despite being surrounded by princes. They were a few hundred in number, with hundreds of thousands of people under their jurisdiction. Such taluqdars were autocrats and said to be the heads of despotic states.

== Taluqdaris ==
The district or estate ruled by a Taluqdar was known as taluqdari or talukdari. According to the Punjab settlement report of 1862, great landholders were appointed taluqdars over a number of villages during the Mughal era. That taluq, or district, usually comprised over 84 villages and a central town. The talukdar was required to collect taxes, maintain law and order, and provide military supplies/manpower to the provincial government (similar to the role of feudal lords in Europe). In most cases the talukdars were entitled to keep one-tenth of the collected revenue. However, some privileged Talukdars were entitled to one quarter and hence were called Chaudhry, which literally means owner of the fourth part.

In Rajasthan, Kathiawar, and Bengal, a talukdar was next only to a raja in extent of land control and social status, but in Punjab and the United Provinces, talukdars were much more powerful and were directly under the provincial governor. During a British parliamentary debate in 1858, Sir C. Wood brought to light the fact that Taluqdar oppression in Oudh was carried to an unthinkable extent. He mentioned that they had been taking over the lands of the remaining rajas all over Oudh. Colonel Sleernan recalled the following act of war by a taluqdar against a Raja:

They plundered the town of Boondee, and pulled down all the houses of the rajah and those of his relatives and dependents, and after plundering all the other villages, brought in 1,000 captives of both sexes and all ages, who were subjected to all manner of torture till they paid.

Similarly, in northern Punjab, the talukdars of Dhanni, Gheb, and Kot were extremely powerful.

Eighteenth-century Bengal witnessed the rise of great territorial landholders at the expense of smaller landholders, who were reduced to the status of dependent taluqdars, required to pay their revenue to the government through the intermediary of the great landlords called Rais, Ranas, Babus, Rajas, and Maharajas. However, many old taluqdars paid revenues to the government directly, like Raja Farzand Ali Khan of Jahangirabad Raj, Raja Jung Bahadur of Nanpara Estate, and were as powerful as the rajas. Some taluqdars, like Thakur Ameer Haider Zaidi of estate Bahuwa, Thakur Ghulam Haider of estate Bahuwa, Chowdhury Ali Akhtar of Bilwa, Ramzan Ali Khan of Unnao, Raja Azam Ali Khan of Deogaon, and Thakur Roshan Zama Khan of Usmanpur, were very close to the government and played an important role in tax collection in the region of Awadh.

== Hyderabad State ==
During the rule of the Nizams in Hyderabad State, the top of the administrator/tax revenue collector hierarchy was the Subedar, who had responsibility for the largest divisions of the country, i.e., the Princely State of Hyderabad, of which there were five. Below this rank, the official title of the lower division (i.e., subdivisions of the five above) post holder was Tehsildar, and below that the rank of Taluqdar, so in effect it could be equated to the three-tier ranking from province administrator to county administrator to district administrator in size from the largest to smallest. These are further divided into villages, under a village officer.

Today, the names Talukdar and Choudhry (with variations in spelling) are common in India and in Indians settled overseas among the descendants of those who held this rank or role in times past.

== See also ==
- Examples of feudalism
- Feudalism in India
- Feudalism in Pakistan
- Tribe
- Zamindar
- Ghatwals and Mulraiyats
- Lord
- Taluqa
- Tehsil
- Tehsildar
- Chaudhary
