= Babu (title) =

Indian honorary title

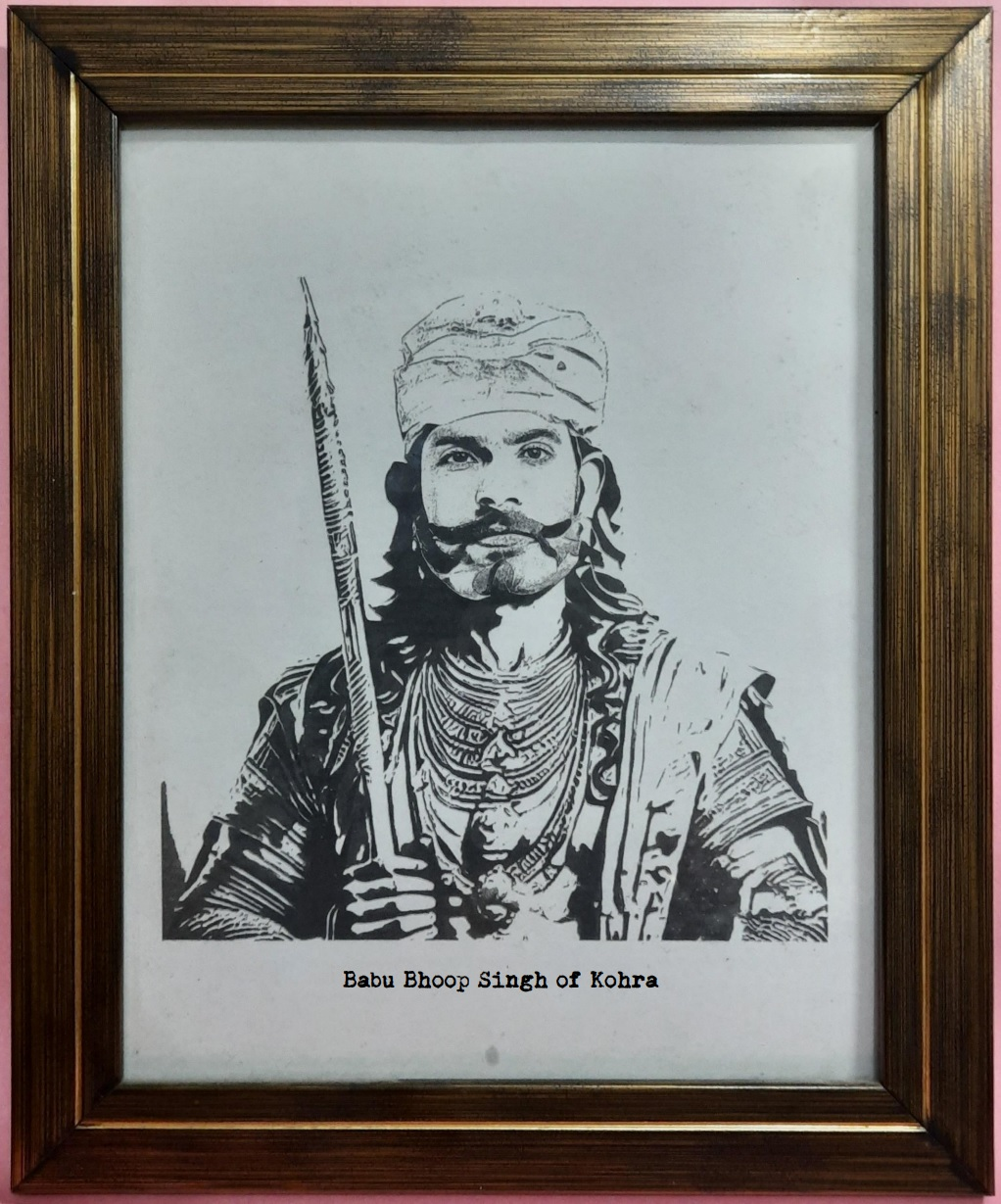
Babu Bhoop Singh of Kohra (estate), Leader in the Indian Rebellion of 1857

Babu or baboo is a historical title of royalty and nobility used by many rulers and chieftains in the Indian subcontinent.

Rani is the title for the wife of a Babu or a female monarch. It also applies to the wife of a Raja. Compound titles include Babu Saheb and Babuji.

== Civil servants ==
In British India, baboo often referred to a native Indian clerk. The word was originally used as a term of respect attached to a proper name, the equivalent of "mister", and "babuji" was used in many parts to mean "sir" as an address of a gentleman; their life-style was also called "baboo culture" often also humorously appealed as "babuism". The British officials treated baboos as workers who had both Indian and British connections. Since the mid-20th century, the term babu is frequently used pejoratively to refer to bureaucrats of Indian Administrative Service (IAS) and other government officials, especially by the Indian media, while the Indian bureaucracy is called "babudom", as in the "rule of babus", especially in India's media.

== Other uses ==
In Nepali, Hindi/Bihari, Bhojpuri, Maithili, Bengali, Telugu, and Odia languages, it is a means of calling with love and affection to spouses or younger brothers, sons, grandsons etc. It can be found in the urban trend to call "babu" to girlfriends or boyfriends, or common-friends to symbolize deep love or dearness. In many Bengali families fathers and sons are usually named babu, as a matter of intimacy, with daughters or mothers.

On the island of Mauritius the word Babu-ji refers to the warrior community (Kshatriya) within the Indo-Mauritian community. This community consists mainly of Bihari Mauritians, whose ancestors landed on the island as Coolies or indentured sugar cane field labourers during the 1810–1968 British colonial rule.

== See also ==
- Rana (title)
- Rawal (title)
- Rai (title)
- Raja
- Babuji (disambiguation)
