= Gauriganj, India =

Town in Uttar Pradesh, India

Gauriganj
- Municipal corporation
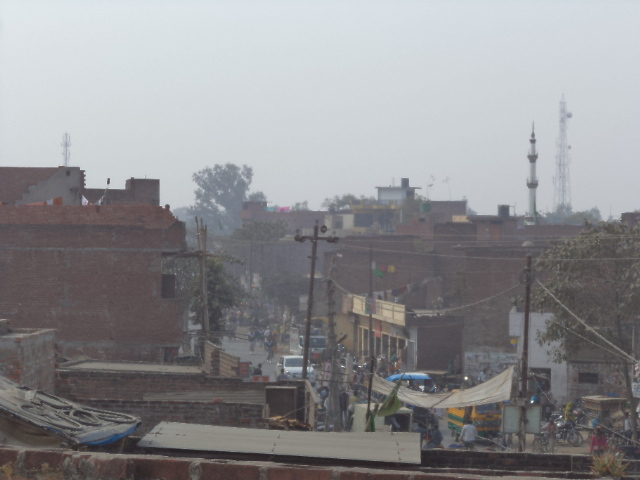
- Gauriganj skyline

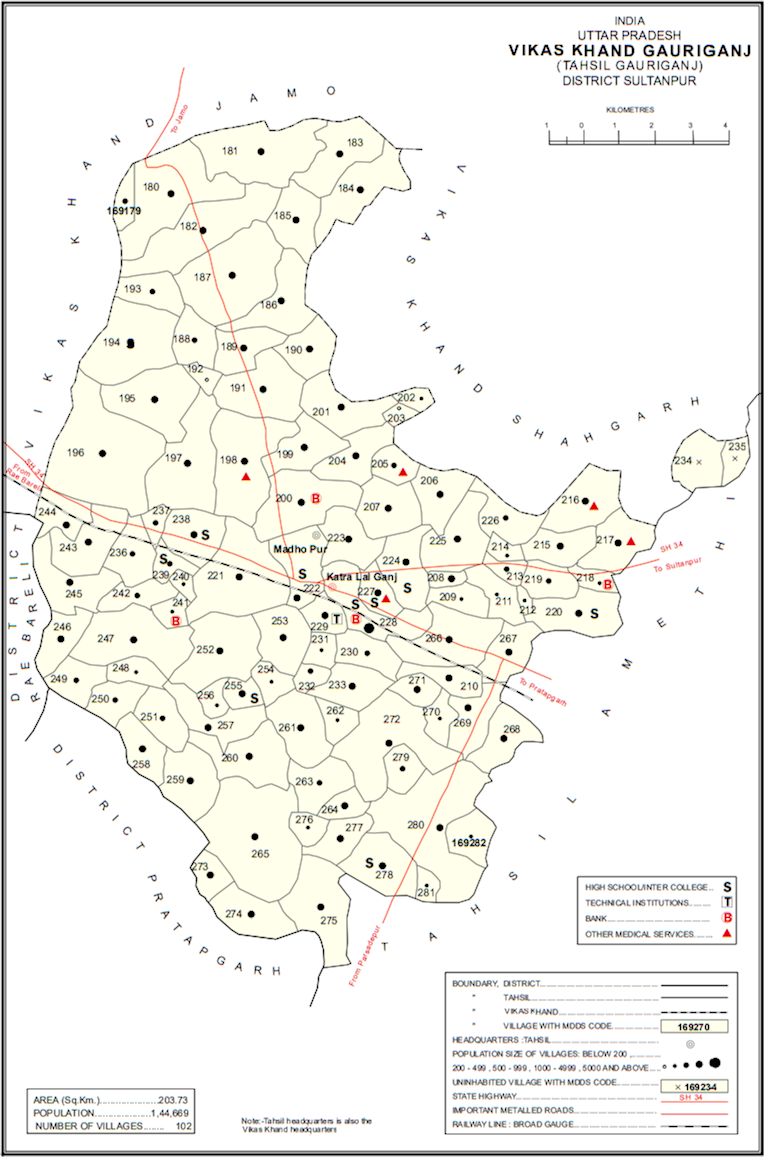
- Map of Gauriganj CD block

- Location of Gauriganj in Uttar Pradesh Gauriganj (India)
- Coordinates: 26.206°N 81.690°E
- Country: India
- State: Uttar Pradesh
- Division: Ayodhya
- District: Amethi

Government
  - Type: Municipal Council
  - Body: Gauriganj Municipal Council
  - Municipal Chairperson: Reshmi (BJP)
  - MLA: Rakesh Pratap Singh (IND)
- Elevation: 104 m (341 ft)

Population (2011)
  - Total: 390,935
  - Density: 855/km^{2} (2,210/sq mi)

Language
  - Official: Hindi
  - Additional official: Urdu
- Time zone: UTC+5:30 (Indian Standard Time)
- Postal code: 227409
- Telephone code: 05-368
- Sex ratio: 904:1000 ♂/♀
- Vehicle Registration: UP-36

Gauriganj is a city, municipal corporation, tehsil and administrative headquarters of Amethi district in Ayodhya division, Uttar Pradesh, India. It is situated about 126 km from the state capital Lucknow. Before July 2010, it was part of Sultanpur district. After that Gauriganj, Amethi, Jais, Jagdispur and Salon formed a new district Chhatrapati Sahuji Maharaj Nagar, later named Gauriganj and now Amethi. Gauriganj is connected with State Highway 34 and National Highway 128.

== Etymology ==
Gauriganj is named after Gauri, a deity in Hinduism.

== History ==
At the turn of the 20th century, Gauriganj was described as "a rising town, with a station on the Oudh and Rohilkhand Railway." It then technically consisted of two villages, Katra-Lalganj and Madhopur. The bazar was founded by Raja Lal Madho Singh, the Raja of Amethi (d.1891). Gauriganj then hosted a rising grain market and had a pound, police station, and post office, as well as an upper primary school, which had many students from both Gauriganj itself and the surrounding countryside; it had a small building, though, which was not big enough to accommodate the student body adequately. The town was then surrounded by several deep hollows. West of Katra-Lalganj were low-lying fields where only jarhan rice was grown. The population of Gauriganj as of 1901 was 2,543, including a large Bania community which was larger than any other town in the district except Sultanpur. There was a Muslim minority of 194, and the rest of the town's population was a mix of Ahirs, Kurmis, and Gadariyas, as well as some Pasis.

== Geography ==
=== Climate ===
Gauriganj has a warm subtropical climate with very cold and dry winters from December to mid-February, and dry, hot summers from April to mid-June. During extreme winters, the maximum temperature is around 12 degrees Celsius and the minimum is around 3 to 4 degrees Celsius. Fog is quite common from late December to late January. Summers can be quite hot with temperatures rising to 40 to 45 degrees Celsius.

Gauriganj has a tropical wet and dry climate with average temperatures ranging between 20 and 28 °C (68 and 82 °F). Gauriganj experiences three distinct seasons: summer, monsoon and a mild autumn. Typical summer months are from March to May, with maximum temperatures ranging from 30 to 45 °C (86 to 113 °F). Although summer doesn't end until May, the city often receives heavy thundershowers in May, and humidity remains high. The rainy season is from mid-June to mid-September, when it gets an average rainfall of 722 mm, mostly from the south-west monsoon winds. Even during the hottest months, the nights are usually cool due to Gauriganj's altitude. The highest temperature ever recorded was 48.3 °C (118.9 °F). The monsoon lasts from June to October, with moderate rainfall and temperatures ranging from 10 to 28 °C (50 to 82 °F). Autumn begins in November. The daytime temperature hovers around 28 °C (82 °F) while the night temperature is below 10 °C (50 °F) for most of December and January, often dropping to 3 to 4 °C (37 to 39 °F).

== Demographics ==
As of 2011 Indian Census, Gauriganj tehsil had a total population of 390,935, of which 196,844 were males and 194,091 were females. Population within the age group of 0 to 6 years was 59,192. The total number of literates in Gauriganj was 214,282, which constituted 54.8% of the population with male literacy of 60.1% and female literacy of 45.4%. The effective literacy rate of 7+ population of Gauriganj was 64.6%, of which male literacy rate was 75.9% and female literacy rate was 53.3%. The Scheduled Castes and Scheduled Tribes population was 108,841 and 86 respectively. Gauriganj had 67,832 households in 2011.

The 1961 census recorded Gauriganj as having a population of 1,883 people (1,038 male and 845 female), in 468 households and 456 physical houses.

=== Languages and religion ===
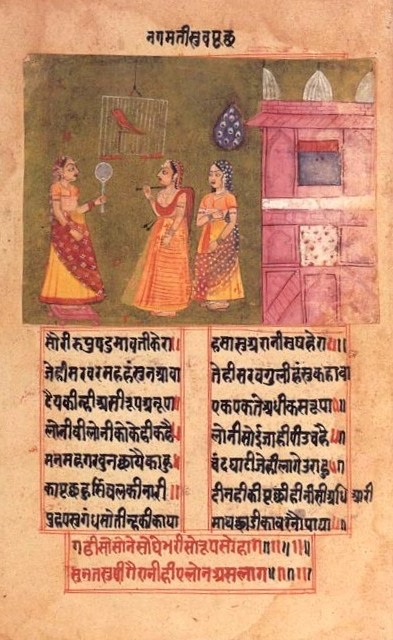
An illustrated manuscript of the epic poem Padmavat, by Malik Muhammad Jayasi (c. 1750)

Hindi and Urdu are the official languages. Awadhi is also widely spoken along with English.

Hinduism is followed by large numbers of the population. A significant part of the population of the city consists of followers of Islam and Sikhism. Christians and Jains constitute a minority of the population.

== Government and politics ==
=== Civic administration ===
Gauriganj had a police force of 2 sub-inspectors, 1 head constable, and 13 constables.

=== Amenities ===
Gauriganj has a post office, a railway station, a library, and a government-run dispensary with 4 male and 2 female beds, as well as a maternity and child welfare centre and a family planning centre.

== Economy ==
Gauriganj hosts a grain market on Mondays and Fridays, with an average attendance of about 2,000 at the time of the 1961 census.

== Cityscape and culture ==
Durga Puja is celebrated in Gauriganj with cultural activities from the 8th day of Navratri for 14 days. Moorty Visarjan is also a big event as it takes approximately 90 hours to complete with thousands of indulged people. Krishna Janmashtami is also celebrated with great joy. In Some Aashram (likes: Baba Balak Das etc.) and some temples (e.g. Doodh Nath Mandir, Ram Janki Mandir, Hanuman Mandir) Feast (i.e. Vishal Bhog Bhandara) took places annually.

Eid-ul-Fitr, Eid-ul-Adha, Eid Milad-un-Nabi and Shab-e-Barat are also celebrated in Gauriganj.

=== Places of interest ===
- Nandmahar Dham
- Lodi Baba Mandir
- Durgan Dham Temple
- Mata Mawai Dham
- Ulta Gadha Dham

== Education ==
The 1951 census recorded Gauriganj as having a district board-run primary school, with 201 students in attendance as of 1 January of the year.

== Villages ==
Gauriganj CD block has the following 102 villages:

Village name	Total land area (hectares)	Population (in 2011)
Manmatipur	194	795
Bhatgawan	389.7	3,654
Bastidai	464.1	2,086
Manjhwara	428.9	3,074
Gulalpur	273.4	1,208
Benipur Baldeo	256.7	1,398
Rauja	190.1	1,538
Tulsi Pur	246.1	1,341
Mau	504.1	3,865
Sarauli	127	687
Oripur	191	1,883
Basupur	194	1,402
Itaujapachhim	290.2	2,303
Mohanpur	45.4	107
Gopalipur	178.4	603
Sujanpur	379.8	1,872
Narauli	345.7	2,153
Guwawan	665.2	4,716
Rohshi Khurd	432.8	2,078
Sarai Hirday Shah	361.6	2,564
Jagdishpur	187.7	1,384
Bishundas Pur	393.2	2,255
Gauri Pur	266.3	2,690
Gopiya Pur	29	294
Hasram Pur	44.4	118
Ana Pur	156.3	1,072
Dost Pur	101	586
Jethauna	176.8	1,018
Harakh Pur	236.1	1,892
Jethumawai	95	1,037
Medan Mawi	88.9	418
Belkhaur	83.7	1,950
Lila Tikara	78.6	417
Suja Pur	38.2	333
Dhani Jalalpur	55.6	685
Basthan	51.1	233
Shahbaj Pur	152.2	1,222
Garha Mafi	220.6	1,563
Darpipur	158.8	1,012
Baburi Tola	48.6	402
Sarai Barwand Singh	125.5	984
Behta	231.1	1,557
Barna Tikar	447.5	2,927
Madho Pur	179.2	4,717
Raj Garh	107.3	2,028
Misrauli	231.8	1,738
Sarai Bhag Mani	235.8	2,185
Mahima Pur	218.5	737
Asaida Pur	158.9	1,387
Katra Lal Ganj	230.1	5,834
Bali Pur Khurdwan	112.6	1,449
Amiya	123.6	799
Chauhan Pur	61.8	360
Palia	68.1	549
Argwan	174.3	1,195
Sembhue	135.8	966
Kaji Patti	44.3	503
Rampur Kurwa	183.5	1,298
Senipur	73.7	653
Madhupur	51	214
Sultanpur	63.4	493
Jagmalpur	113.9	520
Paiga	293.1	1,053
Gvjar Tol	141.4	1,102
Pure Fajil	312.2	1,685
Dharu Pur	117	1,112
Sogara	376.2	1,693
Biswan	59.2	353
Asura	123.1	803
Dhanapur	110	953
Bhawan Shah Pur	129	821
Lugri	314	1,148
Pachehri	234.1	1,403
Paharpur	84.3	494
Raghipur	60	1,207
Banwari Pur	94.1	337
Ronhsi Buzurg	210.3	1,072
Chandai Pur	199.7	1,329
Atta Nagar	244.4	1,417
Bahan Pur	194	1,828
Sakrawan	225.4	1,322
Ramai Pur	126.2	381
Saripur	162.2	895
Kharanwan	112.2	1,056
Saintha	639.6	4,076
Tikariya	360.8	2,031
Khajuri	147	1,066
Basaikpur	193.4	1,787
Gundur	168.9	1,020
Raja Patti	63.1	278
Babupur	122.4	1,226
Anni Baijal	460	3,063
Aintha	116.9	1,369
Pathanpur	221.4	1,449
Pahar Ganj	404.9	2,682
Ismailpur	52	427
Chhitepur	153.1	1,093
Pandri	412	2,513
Gudun Pur	106	874
Samhanwa	495	2,561
Pure Udhao	17.1	267
Lal Shah Pur	125.1	422
Block total	144,669	20,372.8
Village name	Total land area (hectares)	Population (in 2011)

== Notable people ==
- Manoj Muntashir is an Indian lyricist, poet and screenwriter was born in this town.
- Rakesh Pandey (writer and author)
- Jagdish Piyush (journalist, writer and author)
- Akshay Pratap Singh (MLC and former MP)
- Deepak Singh (former MLC)
- Rakesh Pratap Singh (MLA)
- Rudra Pratap Singh (former MP, former MLA, former MLC)
- Tejbhan Singh (former MLA)

== Gallery ==
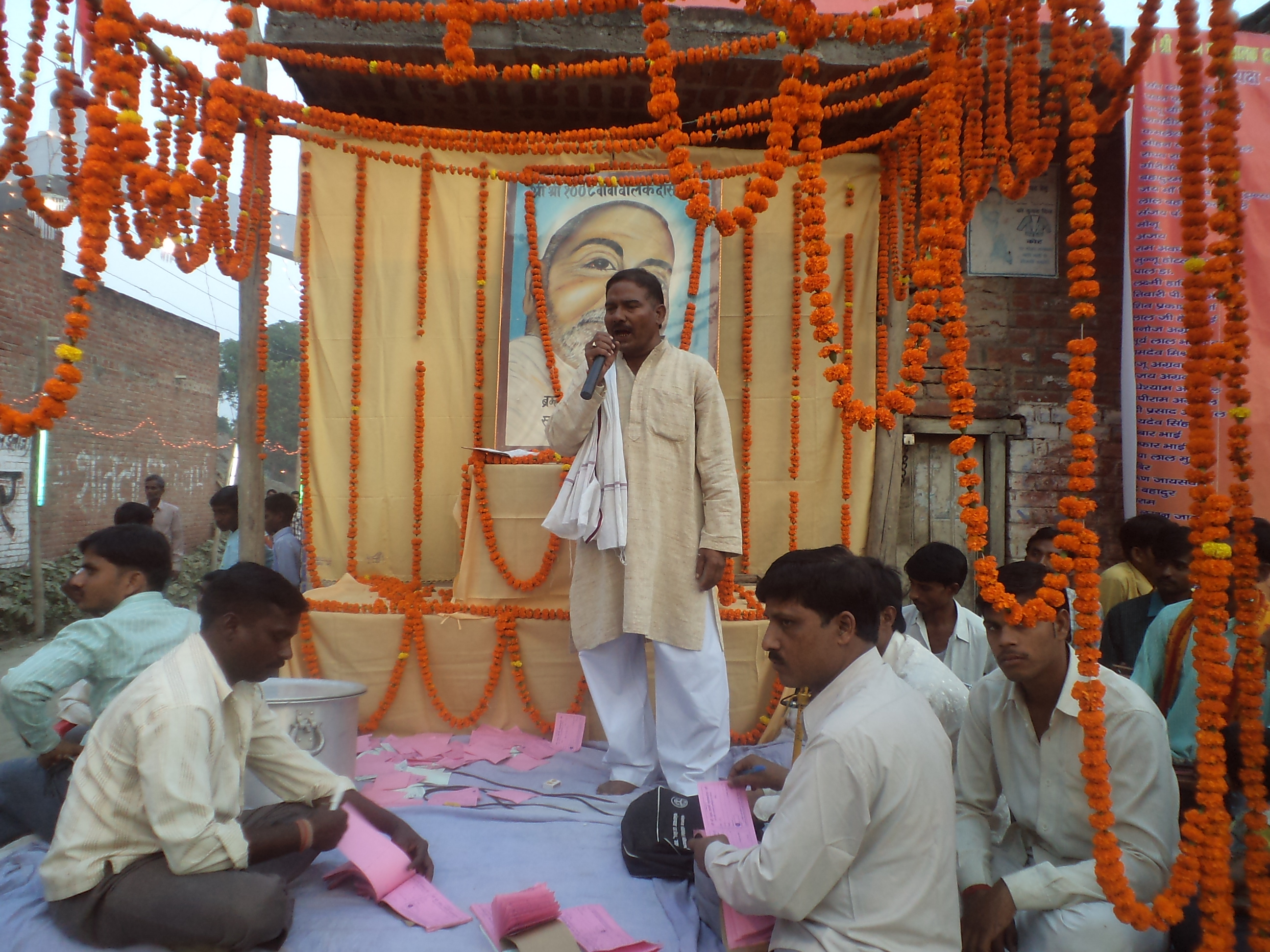
Bhandara at Baba Balak Das Ashram, Stage (2011)

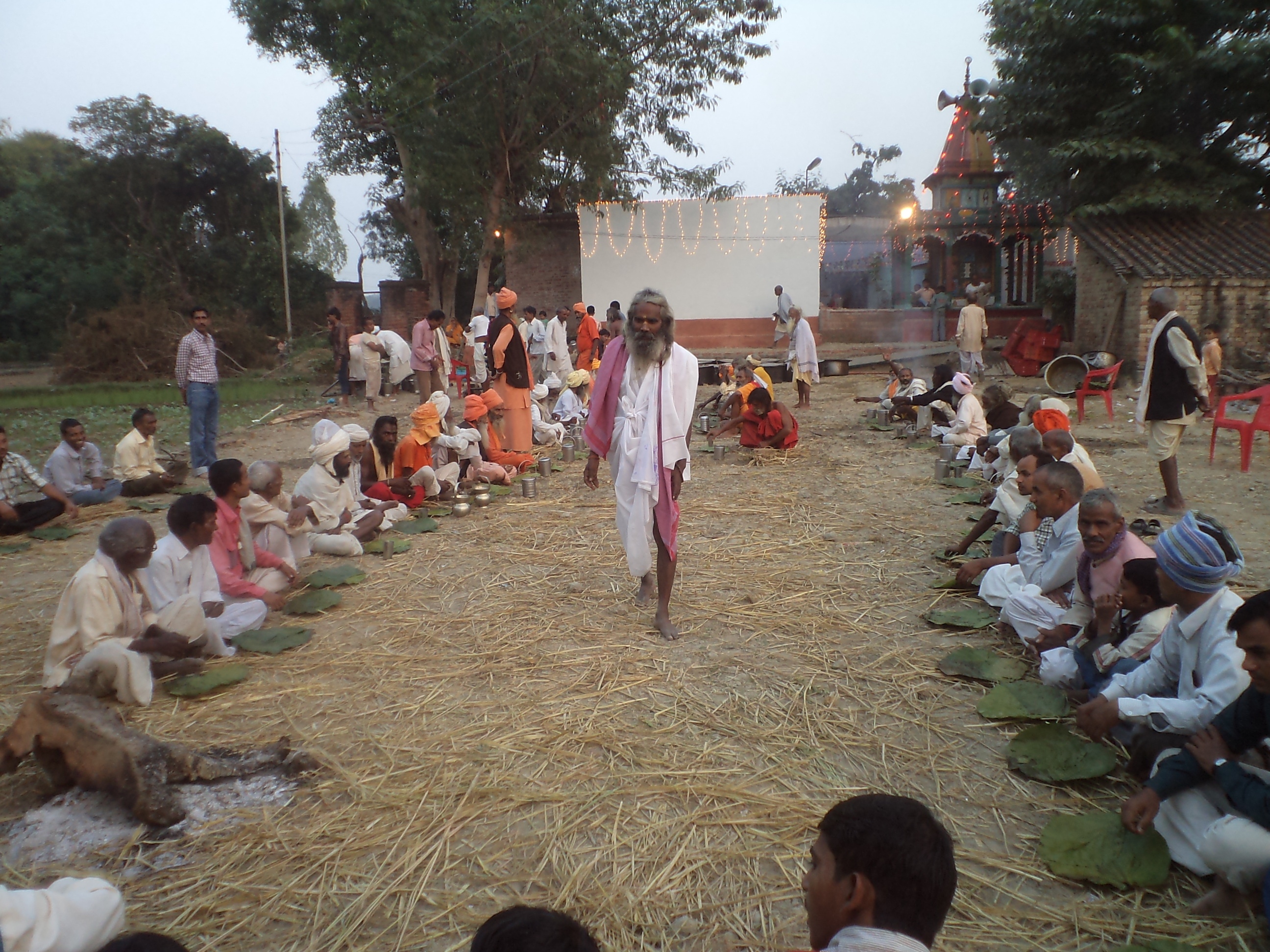
Bhandara at Baba Balak Das Ashram (2011)

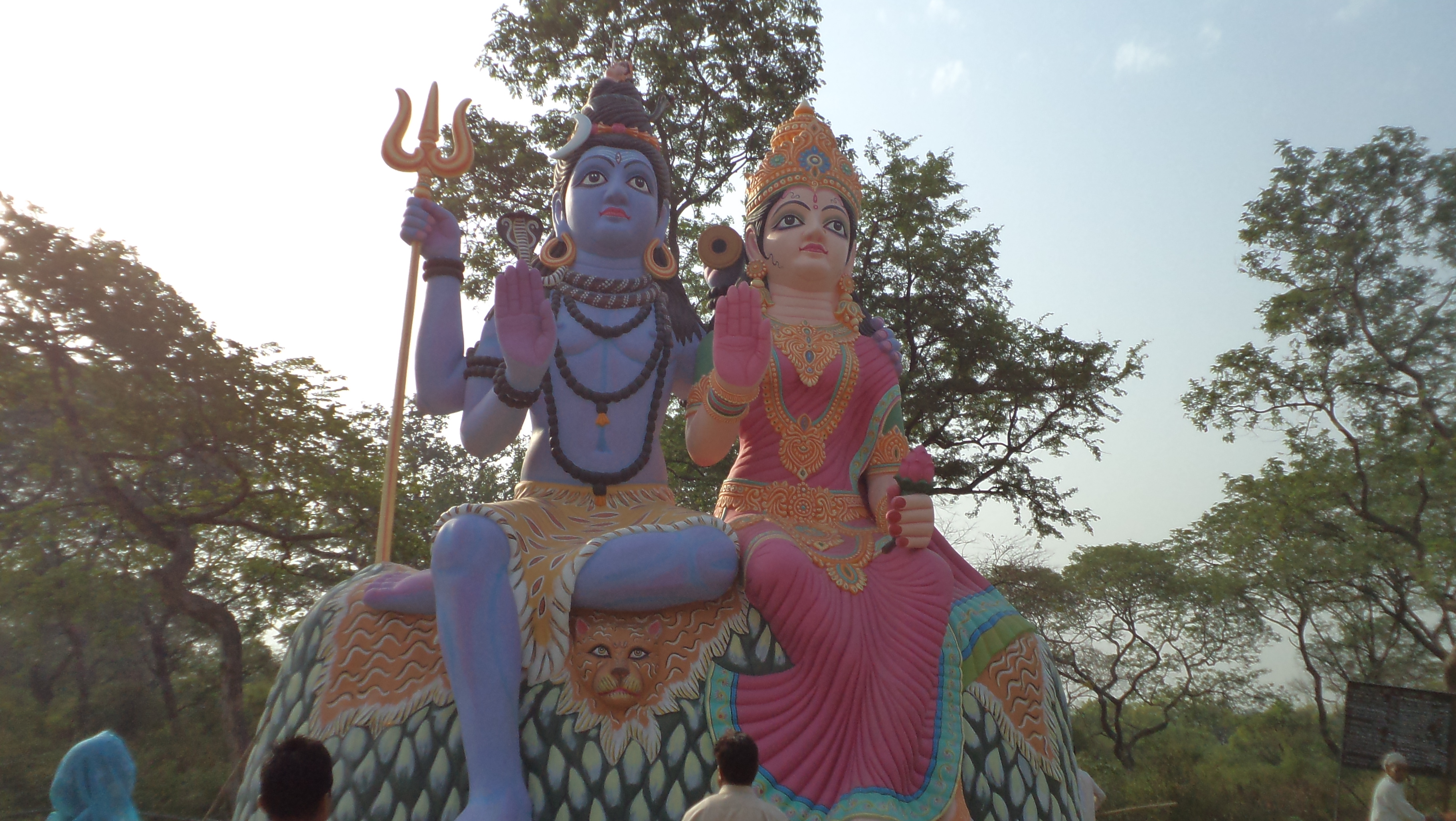
Hanuman Mandir, Madhopur
