= Dhanapur, Gauriganj =

Dhanapur Dhanāpur
- Village
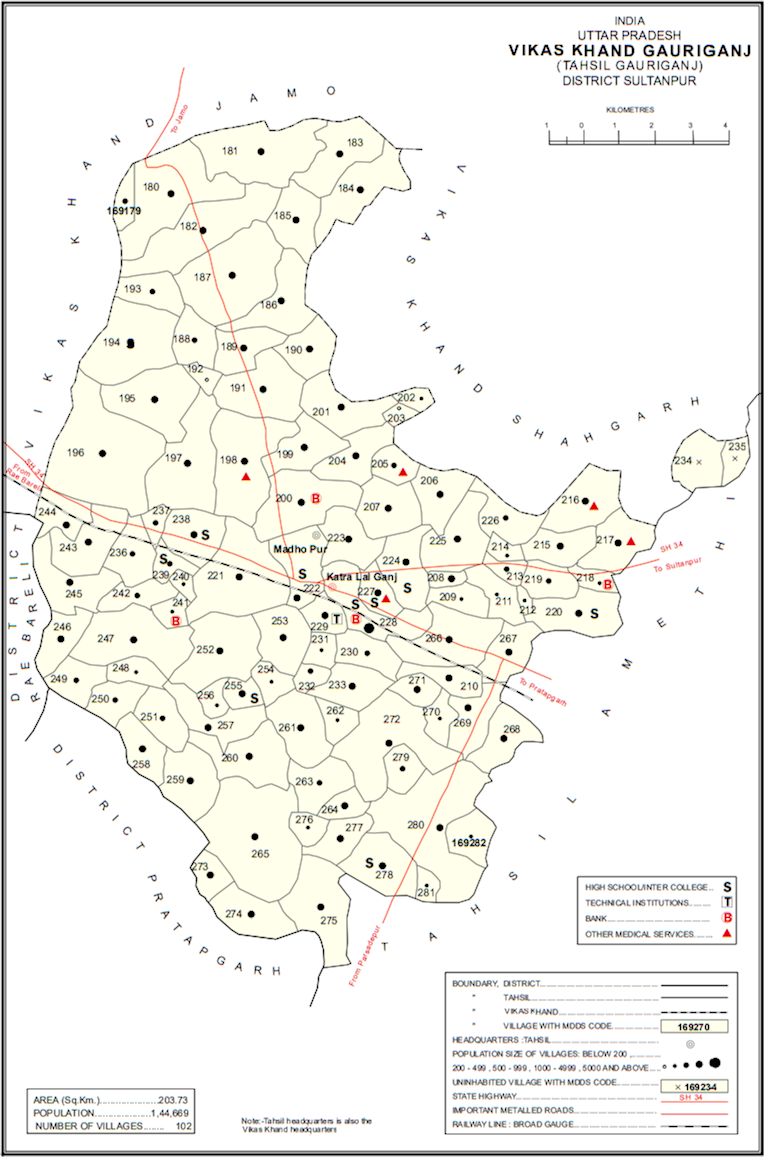
- Map showing Dhanapur (#250) in Gauriganj CD block

- Location in Uttar Pradesh, India
- Coordinates: 26.179942°N 81.632063°E
- Country: India
- State: Uttar Pradesh
- Division: Ayodhya
- District: Amethi

Area
  - Total: 1.10 km^{2} (0.42 sq mi)

Population (2011)
  - Total: 953
  - Density: 866/km^{2} (2,240/sq mi)

Languages
  - Official: Hindi, Urdu
- Time zone: UTC+5:30 (IST)

Dhanapur is a village in Gauriganj block of Amethi district, Uttar Pradesh, India. As of 2011, it has a population of 953 people, in 159 households. It has one primary school and no healthcare facilities and does not host a permanent market or weekly haat. It belongs to the nyaya panchayat of Semuai.

The 1951 census recorded Dhanapur as comprising 2 hamlets, with a total population of 282 people (139 male and 143 female), in 64 households and 61 physical houses. The area of the village was given as 157 acres. 9 residents were literate, all male. The village was listed as belonging to the pargana of Amethi and the thana of Gauriganj.

The 1961 census recorded Dhanapur as comprising 2 hamlets, with a total population of 265 people (124 male and 141 female), in 69 households and 69 physical houses. The area of the village was given as 298 acres.

The 1981 census recorded Dhanapur as having a population of 415 people, in 101 households, and having an area of 118.17 hectares. The main staple foods were listed as wheat and rice.

The 1991 census recorded Dhanapur as having a total population of 532 people (279 male and 253 female), in 115 households and 112 physical houses. The area of the village was listed as 118.00 hectares. Members of the 0-6 age group numbered 92, or 17% of the total; this group was 49% male (45) and 51% female (47). Members of scheduled castes numbered 175, or 33% of the village's total population, while no members of scheduled tribes were recorded. The literacy rate of the village was 27.5% (116 men and 5 women, counting only people age 7 and up). 127 people were classified as main workers (120 men and 7 women), while 0 people were classified as marginal workers; the remaining 405 residents were non-workers. The breakdown of main workers by employment category was as follows: 33 cultivators (i.e. people who owned or leased their own land); 94 agricultural labourers (i.e. people who worked someone else's land in return for payment); 0 workers in livestock, forestry, fishing, hunting, plantations, orchards, etc.; 0 in mining and quarrying; 0 household industry workers; 0 workers employed in other manufacturing, processing, service, and repair roles; 0 construction workers; 0 employed in trade and commerce; 0 employed in transport, storage, and communications; and 0 in other services.
