= Gujar Tola =

Gujar Tola Gūjar Tola
- Village
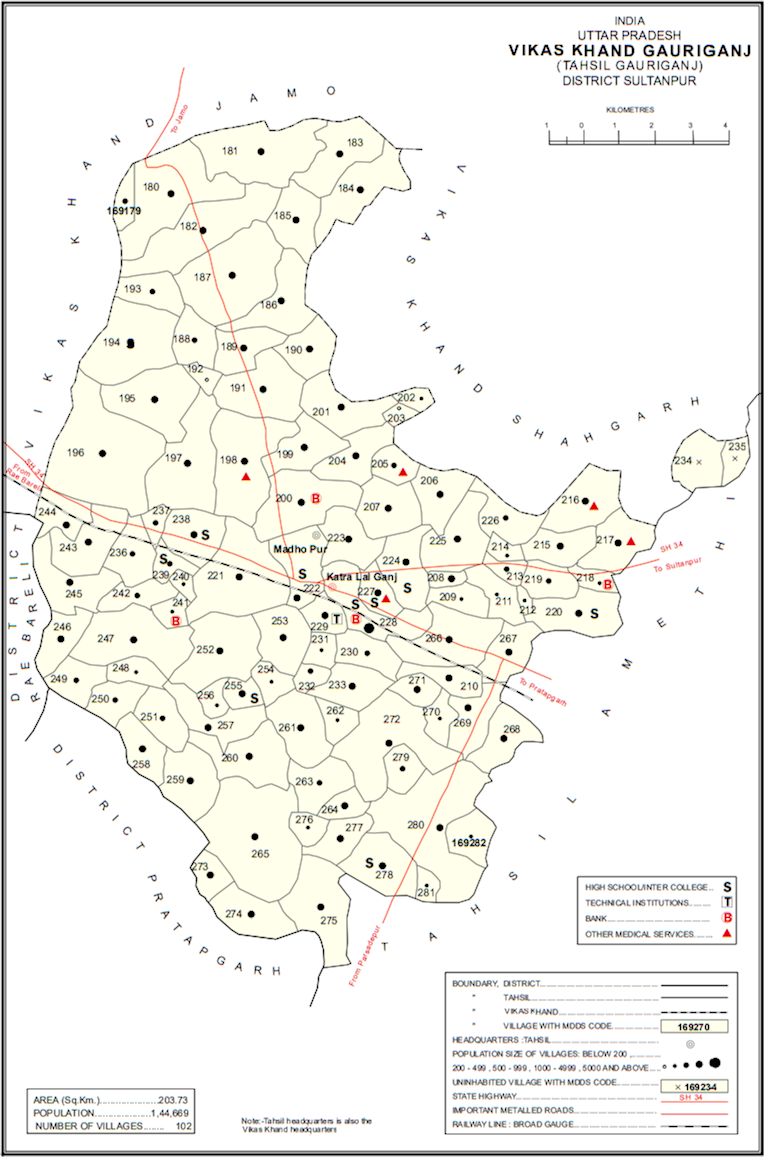
- Map showing Gujar Tola (#244) in Gauriganj CD block

- Location in Uttar Pradesh, India
- Coordinates: 26.221528°N 81.620611°E
- Country: India
- State: Uttar Pradesh
- Division: Faizabad division
- District: Amethi

Area
  - Total: 1.414 km^{2} (0.546 sq mi)

Population (2011)
  - Total: 1,102
  - Density: 779.3/km^{2} (2,019/sq mi)

Languages
  - Official: Hindi, Urdu
- Time zone: UTC+5:30 (IST)

Gujar Tola is a village in Gauriganj block of Amethi district, Uttar Pradesh, India. As of 2011, it has a population of 1,102 people, in 203 households. It has one primary school and no healthcare facilities and does not host a permanent market or weekly haat. It belongs to the nyaya panchayat of Semuai.

The 1951 census recorded Gujar Tola as comprising 4 hamlets, with a total population of 479 people (230 male and 249 female), in 93 households and 90 physical houses. The area of the village was given as 355 acres. 7 residents were literate, all male. The village was listed as belonging to the pargana of Amethi and the thana of Gauriganj.

The 1961 census recorded Gujar Tola as comprising 4 hamlets, with a total population of 513 people (233 male and 280 female), in 98 households and 97 physical houses. The area of the village was given as 355 acres.

The 1981 census recorded Gujar Tola as having a population of 667 people, in 134 households, and having an area of 143.67 hectares. The main staple foods were listed as wheat and rice.

The 1991 census recorded Gujar Tola (as "Gvjar Tol") as having a total population of 790 people (415 male and 375 female), in 143 households and 141 physical houses. The area of the village was listed as 141.00 hectares. Members of the 0-6 age group numbered 130, or 16.5% of the total; this group was 56% male (73) and 44% female (57). Members of scheduled castes numbered 105, or 13% of the village's total population, while no members of scheduled tribes were recorded. The literacy rate of the village was 11% (68 men and 3 women, counting only people age 7 and up). 338 people were classified as main workers (232 men and 106 women), while 17 people were classified as marginal workers (10 men and 7 women); the remaining 435 residents were non-workers. The breakdown of main workers by employment category was as follows: 152 cultivators (i.e. people who owned or leased their own land); 109 agricultural labourers (i.e. people who worked someone else's land in return for payment); 2 workers in livestock, forestry, fishing, hunting, plantations, orchards, etc.; 0 in mining and quarrying; 0 household industry workers; 47 workers employed in other manufacturing, processing, service, and repair roles; 1 construction worker; 6 employed in trade and commerce; 6 employed in transport, storage, and communications; and 15 in other services.
