= Mau, Amethi =

Mau
- Village
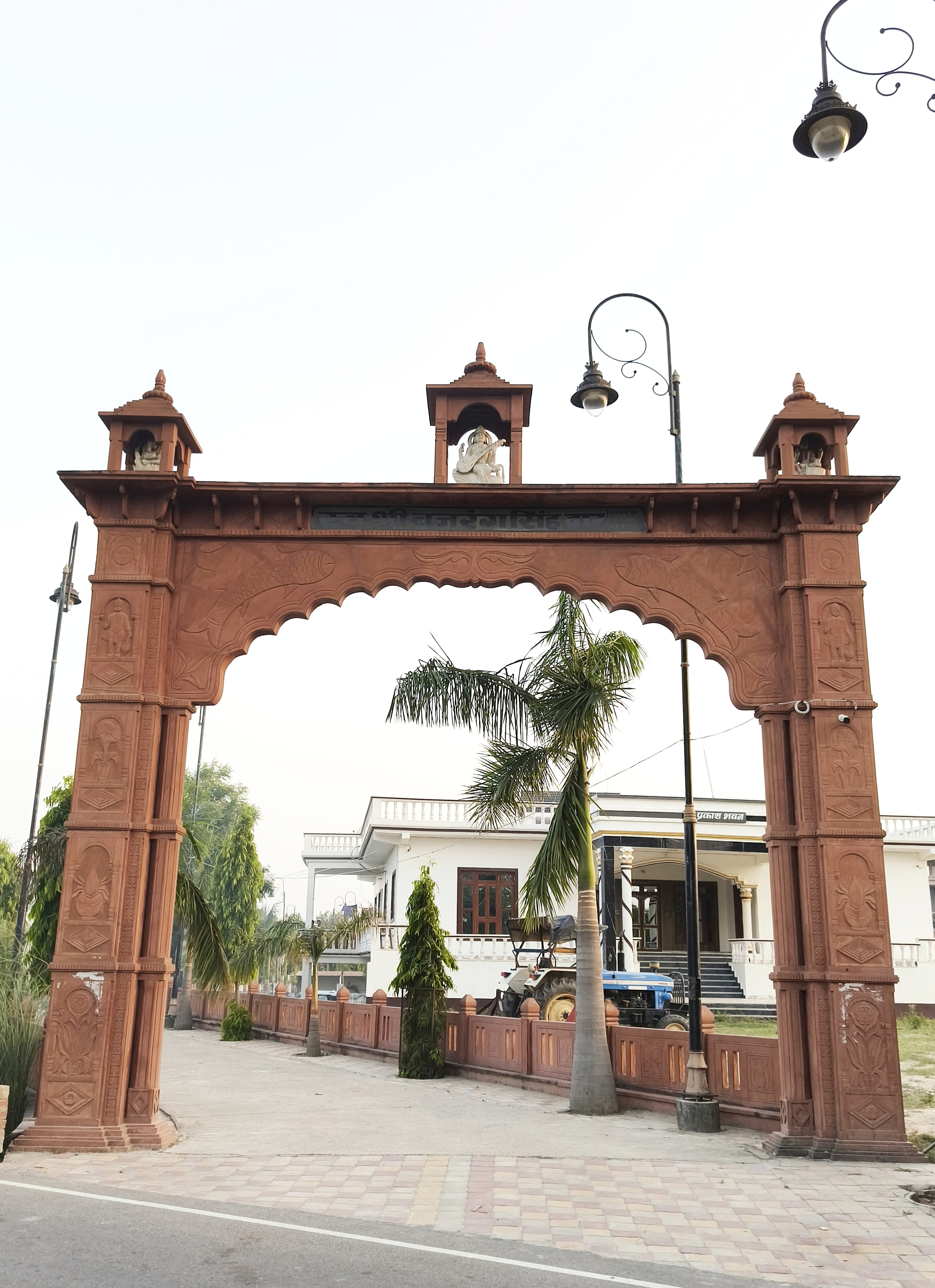
- Bajrang Bahadur Singh Dwar, Mau

- Location in Uttar Pradesh, India Mau (India)
- Coordinates: 26.284541°N 81.674543°E
- Country: India
- State: Uttar Pradesh
- District: Amethi
- Division: Ayodhya
- CD Block: Gauriganj

Government
  - Type: Gram Sabha

Population (2011)
  - Total: 3,865

Languages
  - Official: Hindi, Awadhi
- Time zone: UTC+5:30 (IST)
- Vehicle Registration: UP-36

Mau is a village located in Gauriganj block of Amethi district, Uttar Pradesh, India. As of the 2011 Census, Mau had a population of 3,865 people, in 679 households.

== Notable people ==
- Rakesh Pratap Singh (MLA)
