= Raghipur =

- Village
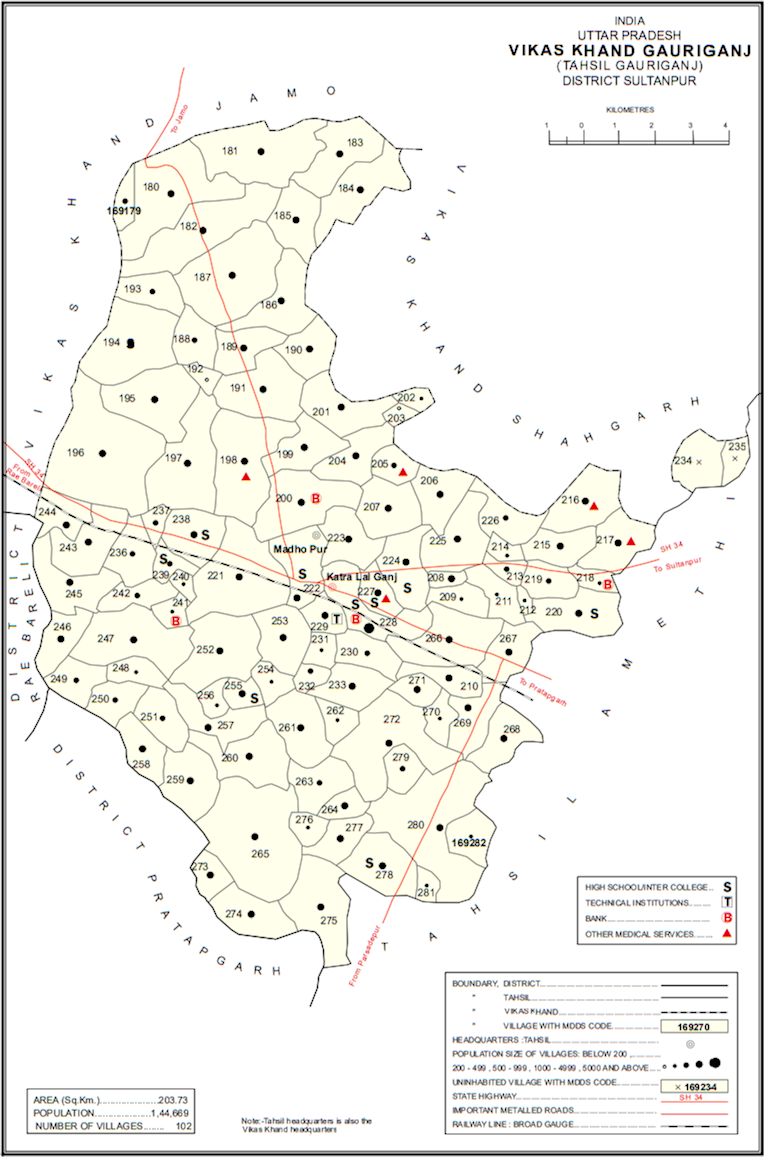
- Map showing Raghipur (#255) in Gauriganj CD block

- Location in Uttar Pradesh, India
- Coordinates: 26.179323°N 81.657592°E
- Country: India
- State: Uttar Pradesh
- Division: Faizabad division
- District: Amethi

Area
  - Total: 0.60 km^{2} (0.23 sq mi)

Population (2011)
  - Total: 1,207
  - Density: 2,000/km^{2} (5,200/sq mi)

Languages
  - Official: Hindi, Urdu
- Time zone: UTC+5:30 (IST)

Raghipur is a village in Gauriganj block of Amethi district, Uttar Pradesh, India. As of 2011, it has a population of 1,207 people, in 231 households. It has one primary school and no healthcare facilities and hosts a permanent market but not a weekly haat. It belongs to the nyaya panchayat of Bahanpur.

== History ==
Raghipur was the only village in the pargana of Amethi not held by the Raja of Amethi under an 1804 agreement.

The 1951 census recorded Raghipur as comprising 1 hamlet, with a total population of 693 people (341 male and 352 female), in 161 households and 142 physical houses. The area of the village was given as 154 acres. 70 residents were literate, all male. The village was listed as belonging to the pargana of Amethi and the thana of Gauriganj. The village had a district board-run primary school with 80 students in attendance as of 1 January 1951.

The 1961 census recorded Raghipur as comprising 1 hamlet, with a total population of 789 people (370 male and 419 female), in 189 households and 178 physical houses. The area of the village was given as 154 acres and it had a post office at that point.

The 1981 census recorded Raghipur as having a population of 895 people, in 190 households, and having an area of 61.92 hectares. The main staple foods were listed as wheat and rice.

The 1991 census recorded Raghipur as having a total population of 984 people (504 male and 480 female), in 196 households and 196 physical houses. The area of the village was listed as 62.00 hectares. Members of the 0-6 age group numbered 170, or 17% of the total; this group was 59% male (100) and 41% female (70). Members of scheduled castes numbered 259, or 26% of the village's total population, while no members of scheduled tribes were recorded. The literacy rate of the village was 38% (224 men and 85 women, counting only people age 7 and up). 348 people were classified as main workers (238 men and 110 women), while 0 people were classified as marginal workers; the remaining 636 residents were non-workers. The breakdown of main workers by employment category was as follows: 120 cultivators (i.e. people who owned or leased their own land); 186 agricultural labourers (i.e. people who worked someone else's land in return for payment); 8 workers in livestock, forestry, fishing, hunting, plantations, orchards, etc.; 0 in mining and quarrying; 7 household industry workers; 3 workers employed in other manufacturing, processing, service, and repair roles; 0 construction workers; 9 employed in trade and commerce; 2 employed in transport, storage, and communications; and 21 in other services.
