= Saintha =

- Village
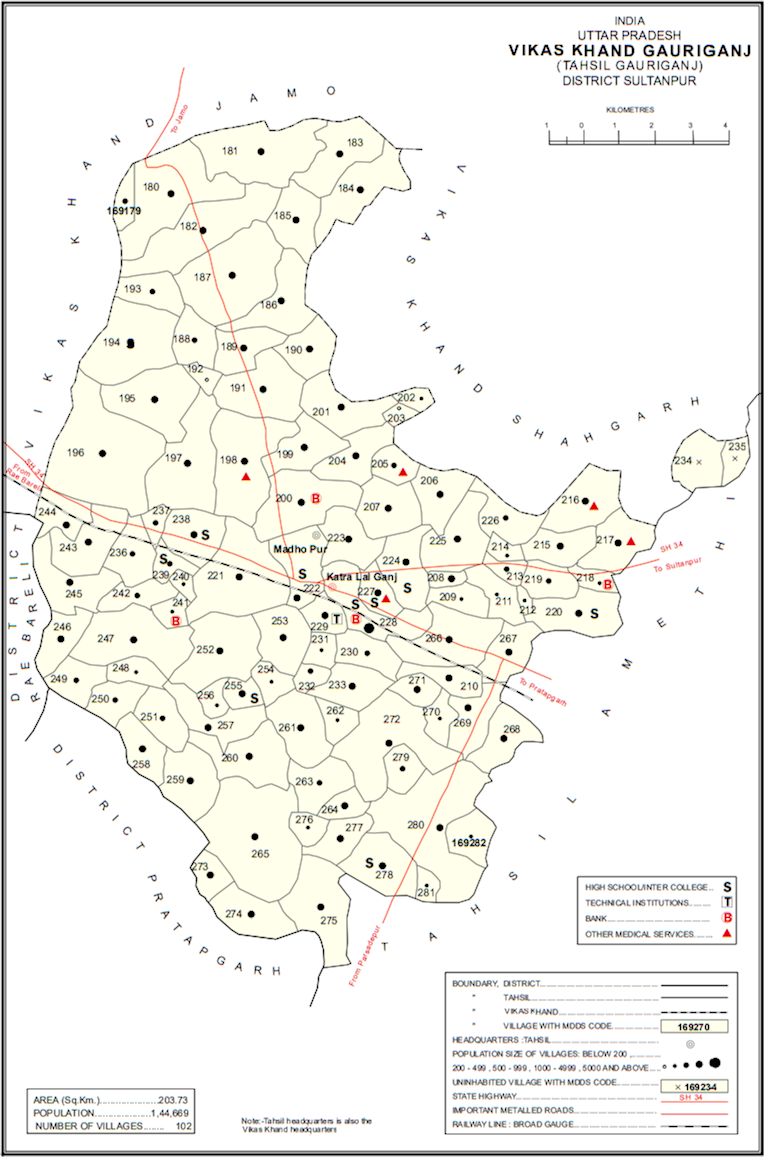
- Map showing Saintha (#265) in Gauriganj CD block

- Location in Uttar Pradesh, India
- Coordinates: 26.14801°N 81.66623°E
- Country: India
- State: Uttar Pradesh
- Division: Faizabad division
- District: Amethi

Area
  - Total: 6.396 km^{2} (2.470 sq mi)

Population (2011)
  - Total: 4,076
  - Density: 637.3/km^{2} (1,651/sq mi)

Languages
  - Official: Hindi, Urdu
- Time zone: UTC+5:30 (IST)

Saintha is a village in Gauriganj block of Amethi district, Uttar Pradesh, India. As of 2011, it has a population of 4,076 people, in 697 households. It has two primary schools and no healthcare facilities and hosts a periodic haat but not a permanent market. It belongs to the nyaya panchayat of Bahanpur.

The 1951 census recorded Saintha as comprising 16 hamlets, with a total population of 1,455 people (712 male and 743 female), in 310 households and 298 physical houses. The area of the village was given as 1,606 acres. 76 residents were literate, all male. The village was listed as belonging to the pargana of Amethi and the thana of Gauriganj. The village had a district board-run primary school with 28 students in attendance as of 1 January 1951.

The 1961 census recorded Saintha as comprising 16 hamlets, with a total population of 1,620 people (799 male and 821 female), in 316 households and 296 physical houses. The area of the village was given as 1,610 acres and it had a post office at that point.

The 1981 census recorded Saintha as having a population of 2,129 people, in 438 households, and having an area of 639.43 hectares. The main staple foods were listed as wheat and rice.

The 1991 census recorded Saintha as having a total population of 2,407 people (1,210 male and 1,197 female), in 457 households and 453 physical houses. The area of the village was listed as 639.00 hectares. Members of the 0-6 age group numbered 452, or 19% of the total; this group was 51% male (232) and 49% female (220). Members of scheduled castes numbered 780, or 32% of the village's total population, while no members of scheduled tribes were recorded. The literacy rate of the village was 29.5% (456 men and 121 women, counting only people age 7 and up). 643 people were classified as main workers (632 men and 11 women), while 0 people were classified as marginal workers; the remaining 1,764 residents were non-workers. The breakdown of main workers by employment category was as follows: 569 cultivators (i.e. people who owned or leased their own land); 33 agricultural labourers (i.e. people who worked someone else's land in return for payment); 1 worker in livestock, forestry, fishing, hunting, plantations, orchards, etc.; 0 in mining and quarrying; 0 household industry workers; 4 workers employed in other manufacturing, processing, service, and repair roles; 0 construction workers; 19 employed in trade and commerce; 4 employed in transport, storage, and communications; and 13 in other services.
