= Lugri =

- Village
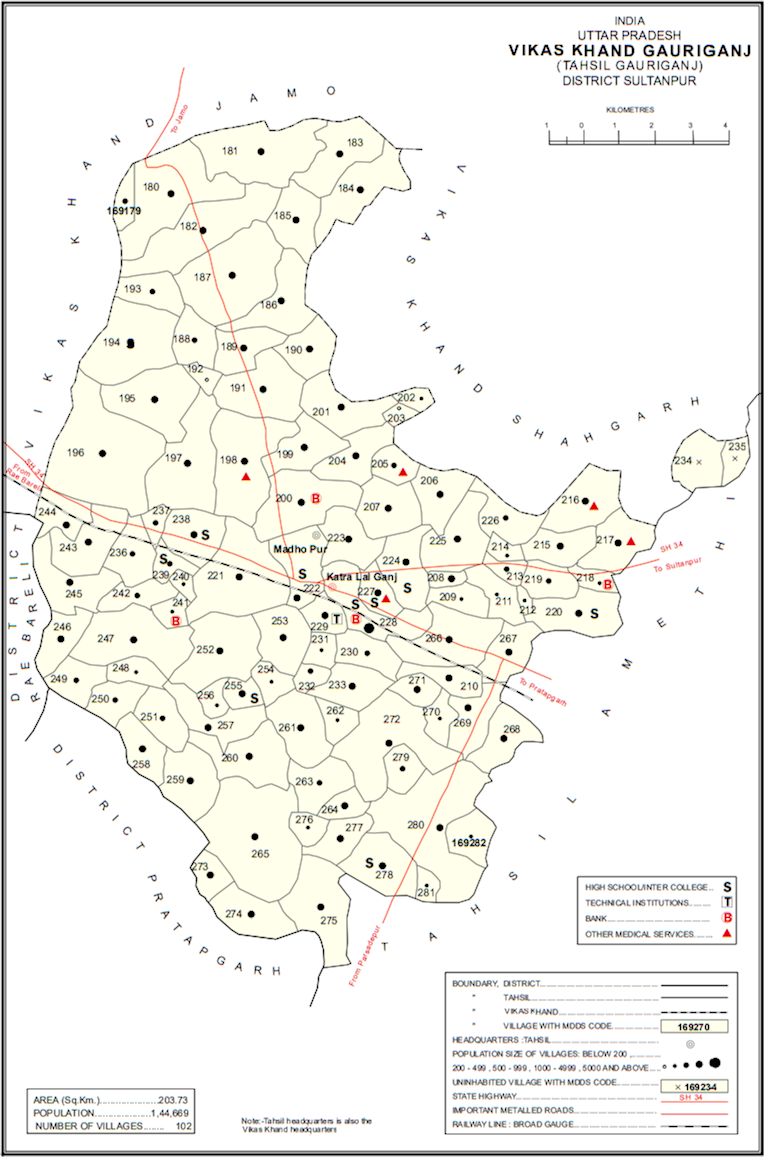
- Map showing Lugri (#252) in Gauriganj CD block

- Location in Uttar Pradesh, India
- Coordinates: 26.186192°N 81.652463°E
- Country: India
- State: Uttar Pradesh
- Division: Ayodhya
- District: Amethi

Area
  - Total: 3.14 km^{2} (1.21 sq mi)

Population (2011)
  - Total: 1,148
  - Density: 366/km^{2} (947/sq mi)

Languages
  - Official: Hindi, Urdu
- Time zone: UTC+5:30 (IST)

Lugri is a village in Gauriganj block of Amethi district, Uttar Pradesh, India. As of 2011, it has a population of 1,148 people, in 231 households. It has one primary school and no healthcare facilities and does not host a permanent market or weekly haat. It belongs to the nyaya panchayat of Bahanpur.

The 1951 census recorded Lugri as comprising 5 hamlets, with a total population of 466 people (224 male and 242 female), in 92 households and 88 physical houses. The area of the village was given as 818 acres. 7 residents were literate, all male. The village was listed as belonging to the pargana of Asal and the thana of Gauriganj.

The 1961 census recorded Lugri as comprising 5 hamlets, with a total population of 477 people (239 male and 238 female), in 99 households and 99 physical houses. The area of the village was given as 818 acres.

The 1981 census recorded Lugri as having a population of 795 people, in 164 households, and having an area of 331.04 hectares. The main staple foods were listed as wheat and rice.

The 1991 census recorded Lugri as having a total population of 886 people (454 male and 432 female), in 176 households and 176 physical houses. The area of the village was listed as 313.00 hectares. Members of the 0-6 age group numbered 181, or 20% of the total; this group was 48% male (87) and 52% female (94). Members of scheduled castes numbered 309, or 35% of the village's total population, while no members of scheduled tribes were recorded. The literacy rate of the village was 26% (150 men and 36 women, counting only people age 7 and up). 247 people were classified as main workers (226 men and 21 women), while 0 people were classified as marginal workers; the remaining 639 residents were non-workers. The breakdown of main workers by employment category was as follows: 223 cultivators (i.e. people who owned or leased their own land); 24 agricultural labourers (i.e. people who worked someone else's land in return for payment); 0 workers in livestock, forestry, fishing, hunting, plantations, orchards, etc.; 0 in mining and quarrying; 1 household industry worker; 0 workers employed in other manufacturing, processing, service, and repair roles; 0 construction workers; 0 employed in trade and commerce; 0 employed in transport, storage, and communications; and 1 in other services.
