= Bhawanshahpur =

Bhawanshahpur Bhawanshāhpur
- Village
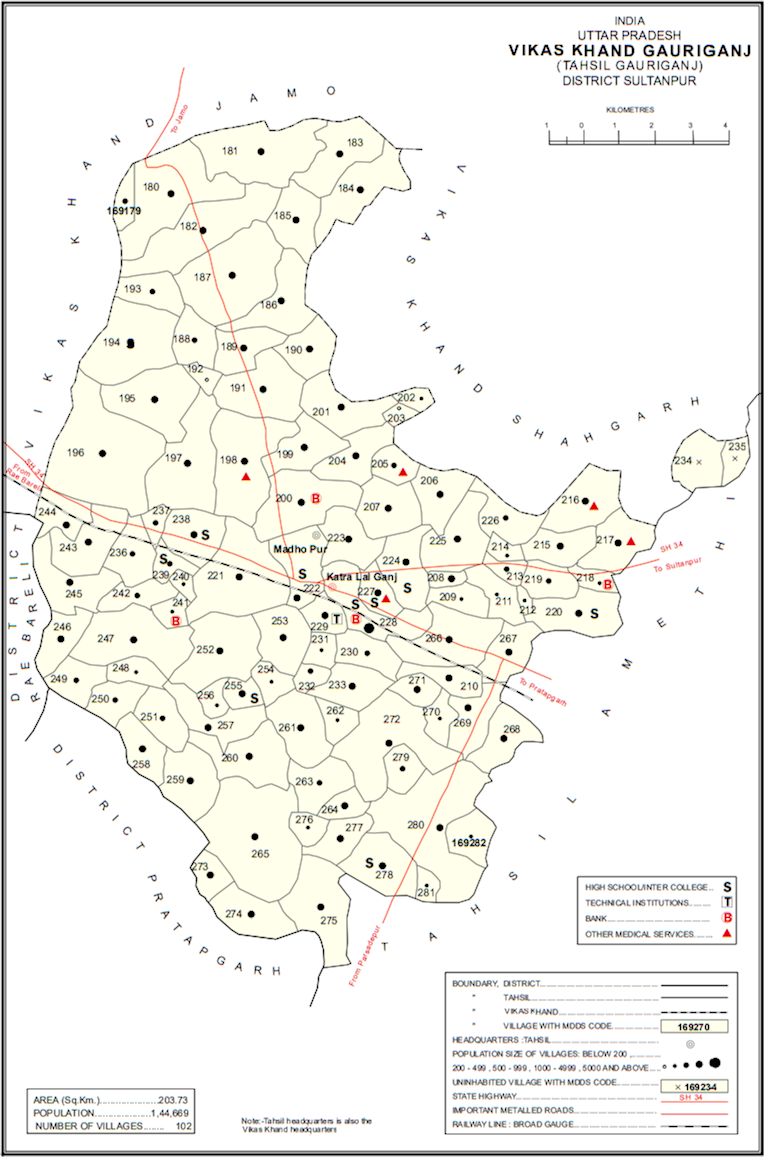
- Map showing Bhawanshahpur (#251) in Gauriganj CD block

- Location in Uttar Pradesh, India
- Coordinates: 26.175542°N 81.647861°E
- Country: India
- State: Uttar Pradesh
- Division: Faizabad division
- District: Amethi

Area
  - Total: 1.29 km^{2} (0.50 sq mi)

Population (2011)
  - Total: 821
  - Density: 636/km^{2} (1,650/sq mi)

Languages
  - Official: Hindi, Urdu
- Time zone: UTC+5:30 (IST)

Bhawanshahpur is a village in Gauriganj block of Amethi district, Uttar Pradesh, India. As of 2011, it has a population of 821 people, in 154 households. It has no schools and no healthcare facilities and does not host a permanent market or weekly haat. It belongs to the nyaya panchayat of Semuai.

The 1951 census recorded Bhawanshahpur (as "Bhawan Shahpur") as comprising 7 hamlets, with a total population of 472 people (240 male and 232 female), in 193 households and 175 physical houses. The area of the village was given as 335 acres. 95 residents were literate, all male. The village was listed as belonging to the pargana of Amethi and the thana of Gauriganj .

The 1961 census recorded Bhawanshahpur (as "Dhawan Shahpur") as comprising 7 hamlets, with a total population of 418 people (195 male and 223 female), in 97 households and 93 physical houses. The area of the village was given as 335 acres.

The 1981 census recorded Bhawanshahpur (as "Bhawan Shahpur") as having a population of 512 people, in 119 households, and having an area of 136.38 hectares. The main staple foods were listed as wheat and rice.

The 1991 census recorded Bhawanshahpur (as "Bhawan Shah Pur") as having a total population of 569 people (314 male and 255 female), in 126 households and 126 physical houses. The area of the village was listed as 136.00 hectares. Members of the 0-6 age group numbered 67, or 12% of the total; this group was 46% male (31) and 54% female (34). Members of scheduled castes numbered 116, or 20% of the village's total population, while no members of scheduled tribes were recorded. The literacy rate of the village was 24% (113 men and 8 women, counting only people age 7 and up). 216 people were classified as main workers (208 men and 8 women), while 25 people were classified as marginal workers (1 man and 24 women); the remaining 328 residents were non-workers. The breakdown of main workers by employment category was as follows: 156 cultivators (i.e. people who owned or leased their own land); 58 agricultural labourers (i.e. people who worked someone else's land in return for payment); 0 workers in livestock, forestry, fishing, hunting, plantations, orchards, etc.; 0 in mining and quarrying; 0 household industry workers; 0 workers employed in other manufacturing, processing, service, and repair roles; 0 construction workers; 0 employed in trade and commerce; 0 employed in transport, storage, and communications; and 2 in other services.
