= Pachehri =

- Village
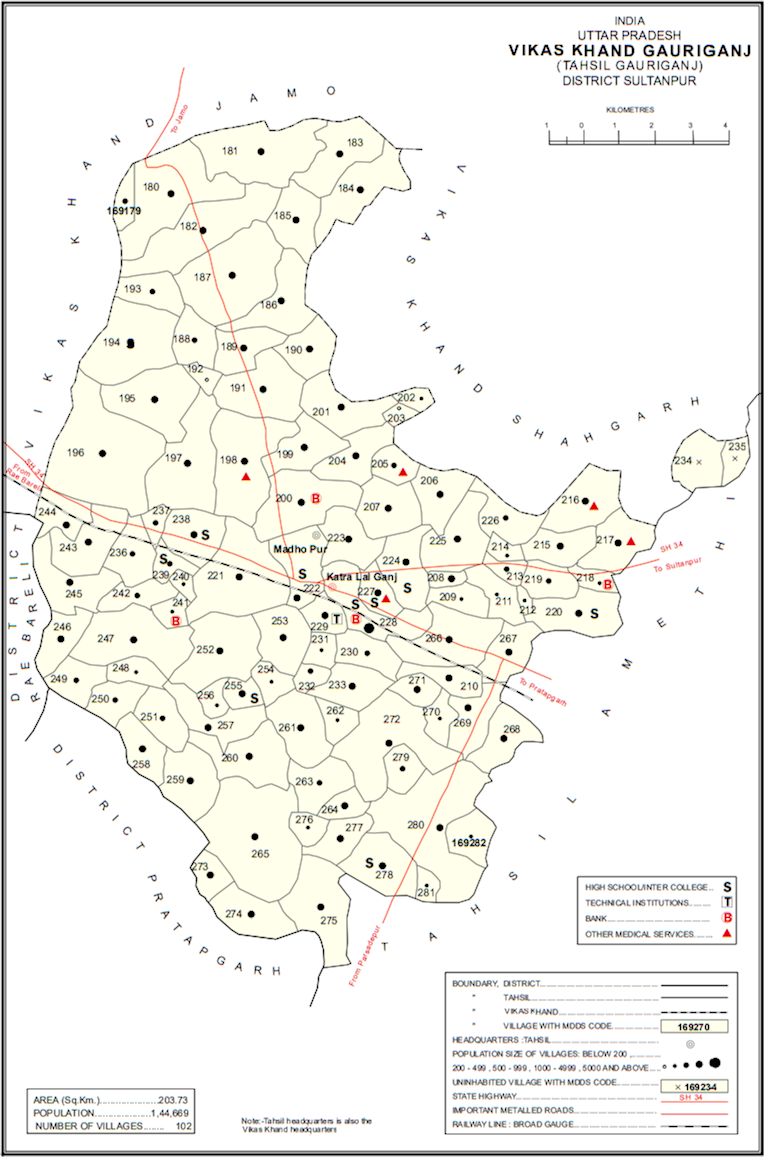
- Map showing Pachehri (#253) in Gauriganj CD block

- Location in Uttar Pradesh, India
- Coordinates: 26.19592°N 81.681009°E
- Country: India
- State: Uttar Pradesh
- Division: Faizabad division
- District: Amethi

Area
  - Total: 2.341 km^{2} (0.904 sq mi)

Population (2011)
  - Total: 1,403
  - Density: 599.3/km^{2} (1,552/sq mi)

Languages
  - Official: Hindi, Urdu
- Time zone: UTC+5:30 (IST)

Pachehri is a village in Gauriganj block of Amethi district, Uttar Pradesh, India. As of 2011, it has a population of 1,403 people, in 263 households. It has one primary school and no healthcare facilities and does not host a permanent market or weekly haat. It belongs to the nyaya panchayat of Bahanpur.

The 1951 census recorded Pachehri (as "Pachheli") as comprising 1 hamlets, with a total population of 484 people (243 male and 241 female), in 100 households and 94 physical houses. The area of the village was given as 580 acres. 50 residents were literate, 49 male and 1 female. The village was listed as belonging to the pargana of Amethi and the thana of Gauriganj.

The 1961 census recorded Pachehri as comprising 1 hamlet, with a total population of 555 people (291 male and 264 female), in 104 households and 104 physical houses. The area of the village was given as 580 acres.

The 1981 census recorded Pachehri as having a population of 773 people, in 159 households, and having an area of 234.32 hectares. The main staple foods were listed as wheat and rice.

The 1991 census recorded Pachehri as having a total population of 1,336 people (835 male and 531 female), in 228 households and 226 physical houses. The area of the village was listed as 234.00 hectares. Members of the 0-6 age group numbered 168, or 12% of the total; this group was 55% male (92) and 45% female (76). Members of scheduled castes numbered 377, or 27.5% of the village's total population, while no members of scheduled tribes were recorded. The literacy rate of the village was 53% (519 men and 117 women, counting only people age 7 and up). 331 people were classified as main workers (307 men and 24 women), while 161 people were classified as marginal workers (23 men and 138 women); the remaining 874 residents were non-workers. The breakdown of main workers by employment category was as follows: 202 cultivators (i.e. people who owned or leased their own land); 60 agricultural labourers (i.e. people who worked someone else's land in return for payment); 8 workers in livestock, forestry, fishing, hunting, plantations, orchards, etc.; 0 in mining and quarrying; 2 household industry workers; 3 workers employed in other manufacturing, processing, service, and repair roles; 0 construction workers; 1 employed in trade and commerce; 0 employed in transport, storage, and communications; and 55 in other services.
