= Barna Tikar =

- Village
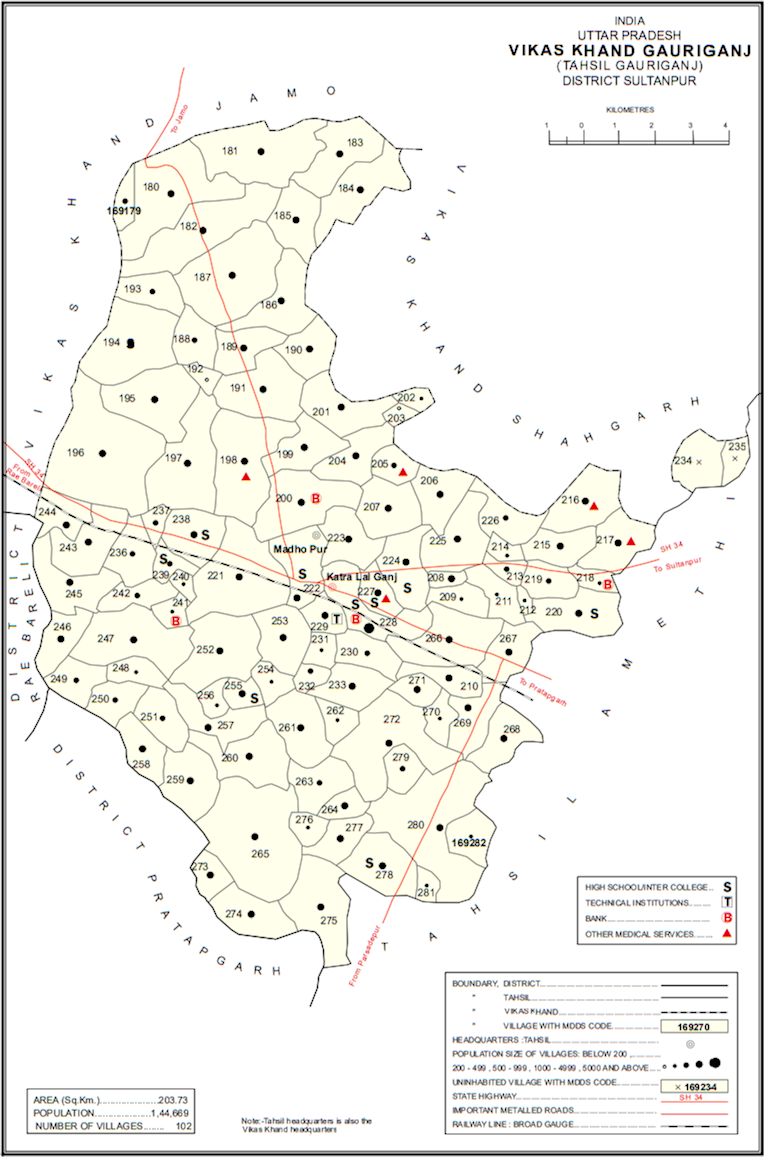
- Map showing Barna Tikar (#221) in Gauriganj CD block

- Location in Uttar Pradesh, India
- Coordinates: 26.211075°N 81.661782°E
- Country: India
- State: Uttar Pradesh
- Division: Faizabad division
- District: Amethi

Area
  - Total: 4.475 km^{2} (1.728 sq mi)

Population (2011)
  - Total: 2,927
  - Density: 654.1/km^{2} (1,694/sq mi)

Languages
  - Official: Hindi, Urdu
- Time zone: UTC+5:30 (IST)

Barna Tikar is a village in Gauriganj block of Amethi district, Uttar Pradesh, India. As of 2011, it has a population of 2,927 people, in 531 households. It has one primary school and no healthcare facilities and hosts both a permanent market and a weekly haat. It belongs to the nyaya panchayat of Katra Lalganj.

== History ==
Barna Tikar was historically the seat of a branch of the Bandhalgoti Rajputs. This branch is said to have been founded by Shyam Lal, brother of Sri Ramdeo (ancestor of the later Rajas of Amethi), and who established the Barna Tikar estate at the time of Sher Shah Suri in the 16th century.

The 1951 census recorded Barna Tikar (as "Barnatikar") as comprising 4 hamlets, with a total population of 1,225 people (610 male and 615 female), in 278 households and 253 physical houses. The area of the village was given as 1,187 acres. 43 residents were literate, 37 male and 6 female. The village was listed as belonging to the pargana of Amethi and the thana of Gauriganj. The village had a district board-run primary school with 18 students in attendance as of 1 January 1951.

The 1961 census recorded Barna Tikar as comprising 4 hamlets, with a total population of 1,408 people (722 male and 686 female), in 304 households and 293 physical houses. The area of the village was given as 1,186 acres.

The 1981 census recorded Barna Tikar as having a population of 1,812 people, in 362 households, and having an area of 455.69 hectares. The main staple foods were listed as wheat and rice.

The 1991 census recorded Barna Tikar as having a total population of 2,173 people (1,122 male and 1,051 female), in 400 households and 392 physical houses. The area of the village was listed as 456.00 hectares. Members of the 0-6 age group numbered 426, or 20% of the total; this group was 51% male (216) and 49% female (210). Members of scheduled castes numbered 767, or 35% of the village's total population, while no members of scheduled tribes were recorded. The literacy rate of the village was 31% (385 men and 163 women, counting only people age 7 and up). 747 people were classified as main workers (641 men and 106 women), while 366 people were classified as marginal workers (all women); the remaining 1,060 residents were non-workers. The breakdown of main workers by employment category was as follows: 332 cultivators (i.e. people who owned or leased their own land); 375 agricultural labourers (i.e. people who worked someone else's land in return for payment); 8 workers in livestock, forestry, fishing, hunting, plantations, orchards, etc.; 0 in mining and quarrying; 8 household industry workers; 0 workers employed in other manufacturing, processing, service, and repair roles; 0 construction workers; 0 employed in trade and commerce; 6 employed in transport, storage, and communications; and 26 in other services.
