= Biswan, Amethi =

Biswan Biswān
- Village
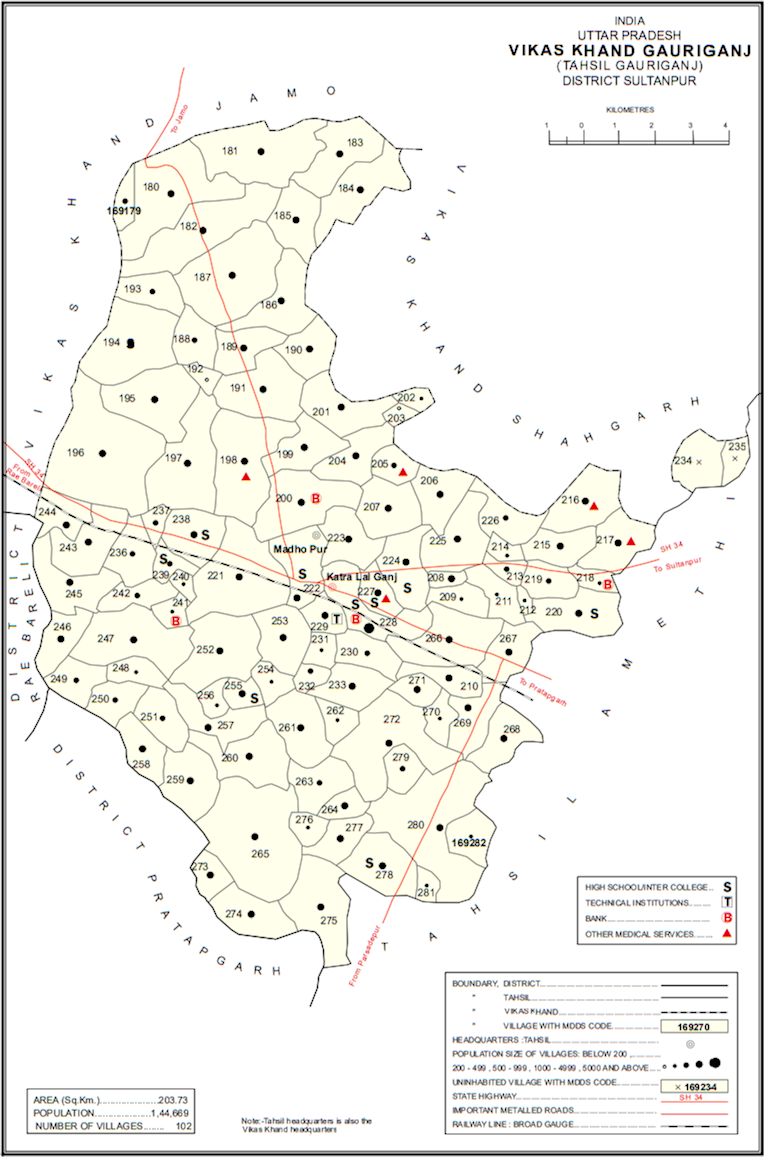
- Map showing Biswan (#248) in Gauriganj CD block

- Location in Uttar Pradesh, India
- Coordinates: 26.185399°N 81.635101°E
- Country: India
- State: Uttar Pradesh
- Division: Faizabad division
- District: Amethi

Area
  - Total: 0.592 km^{2} (0.229 sq mi)

Population (2011)
  - Total: 353
  - Density: 596/km^{2} (1,540/sq mi)

Languages
  - Official: Hindi, Urdu
- Time zone: UTC+5:30 (IST)

Biswan is a village in Gauriganj block of Amethi district, Uttar Pradesh, India. As of 2011, it has a population of 353 people, in 55 households. It has no schools and no healthcare facilities and hosts both a permanent market and a weekly haat. It belongs to the nyaya panchayat of Semuai.

The 1951 census recorded Biswan as comprising 3 hamlets, with a total population of 193 people (104 male and 89 female), in 45 households and 45 physical houses. The area of the village was given as 230 acres. 1 resident was literate, a male. The village was listed as belonging to the pargana of Amethi and the thana of Gauriganj .

The 1961 census recorded Biswan as comprising 3 hamlets, with a total population of 183 people (95 male and 88 female), in 40 households and 40 physical houses. The area of the village was given as 230 acres.

The 1981 census recorded Biswan as having a population of 210 people, in 43 households, and having an area of 93.49 hectares. The main staple foods were listed as wheat and rice.

The 1991 census recorded Biswan as having a total population of 268 people (133 male and 135 female), in 47 households and 45 physical houses. The area of the village was listed as 93.00 hectares. Members of the 0-6 age group numbered 49, or 18% of the total; this group was 43% male (21) and 57% female (28). Members of scheduled castes numbered 46, or 17% of the village's total population, while no members of scheduled tribes were recorded. The literacy rate of the village was 43% (73 men and 21 women, counting only people age 7 and up). 68 people were classified as main workers (66 men and 2 women), while 0 people were classified as marginal workers; the remaining 200 residents were non-workers. The breakdown of main workers by employment category was as follows: 54 cultivators (i.e. people who owned or leased their own land); 13 agricultural labourers (i.e. people who worked someone else's land in return for payment); 0 workers in livestock, forestry, fishing, hunting, plantations, orchards, etc.; 0 in mining and quarrying; 0 household industry workers; 0 workers employed in other manufacturing, processing, service, and repair roles; 0 construction workers; 0 employed in trade and commerce; 0 employed in transport, storage, and communications; and 1 in other services.
