= Pandri, Amethi District =

Pandri
- Village
- Nickname: Padri
- Location in Uttar Pradesh, India Pandri (India)
- Coordinates: 26°07′43″N 81°41′47″E
- Country: India
- State: Uttar Pradesh
- District: Amethi
- Tehsil: Gauriganj

Population (2011)
  - Total: 2,513

Languages
  - Official: Hindi, Awadhi
- Time zone: UTC+5:30 (IST)
- Postal code: 227405
- Vehicle registration: UP-33

Pandri or Padri is a village in Gauriganj, Amethi district (formerly a part of the Sultanpur district), Uttar Pradesh in India. There is a post office, primary school, and an intermediate college and it is very sparsely populated with a group of 22 small purvas including pure vindhya lal. Pandri is located at a distance of 12 km from the district headquarter Gauriganj and 15 km from Amethi.

This village is a part of Gauriganj (Assembly constituency) and Amethi (Lok Sabha constituency).
