= Jagmalpur =

Jagmalpur Jagmālpur
- Village
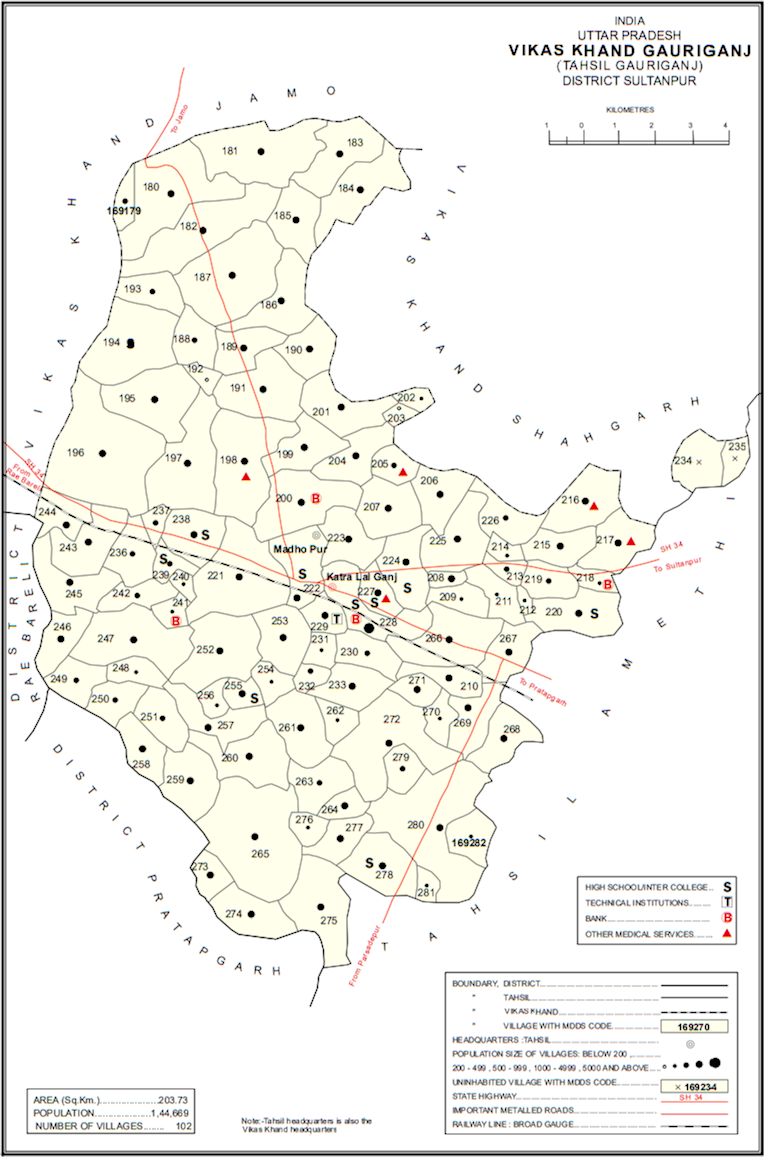
- Map showing Jagmalpur (#242) in Gauriganj CD block

- Location in Uttar Pradesh, India
- Coordinates: 26.201437°N 81.634729°E
- Country: India
- State: Uttar Pradesh
- Division: Faizabad division
- District: Amethi

Area
  - Total: 1.139 km^{2} (0.440 sq mi)

Population (2011)
  - Total: 520
  - Density: 460/km^{2} (1,200/sq mi)

Languages
  - Official: Hindi, Urdu
- Time zone: UTC+5:30 (IST)

Jagmalpur is a village in Gauriganj block of Amethi district, Uttar Pradesh, India. As of 2011, it has a population of 520 people, in 80 households. It has two primary schools and no healthcare facilities and does not host a permanent market or weekly haat. It belongs to the nyaya panchayat of Semuai.

The 1951 census recorded Jagmalpur as comprising 3 hamlets, with a total population of 214 people (112 male and 102 female), in 47 households and 46 physical houses. The area of the village was given as 293 acres. 12 residents were literate, all male. The village was listed as belonging to the pargana of Amethi and the thana of Gauriganj.

The 1961 census recorded Jagmalpur as comprising 3 hamlets, with a total population of 201 people (109 male and 92 female), in 42 households and 40 physical houses. The area of the village was given as 293 acres.

The 1981 census recorded Jagmalpur as having a population of 328 people, in 71 households, and having an area of 115.34 hectares. The main staple foods were listed as wheat and rice.

The 1991 census recorded Jagmalpur as having a total population of 328 people (155 male and 173 female), in 76 households and 76 physical houses. The area of the village was listed as 115.00 hectares. Members of the 0-6 age group numbered 66, or 20% of the total; this group was 58% male (38) and 42% female (28). Members of scheduled castes numbered 160, or 49% of the village's total population, while no members of scheduled tribes were recorded. The literacy rate of the village was 34% (52 men and 38 women, counting only people age 7 and up). 97 people were classified as main workers (87 men and 10 women), while 104 people were classified as marginal workers (all women); the remaining 127 residents were non-workers. The breakdown of main workers by employment category was as follows: 92 cultivators (i.e. people who owned or leased their own land); 1 agricultural labourer (i.e. people who worked someone else's land in return for payment); 0 workers in livestock, forestry, fishing, hunting, plantations, orchards, etc.; 0 in mining and quarrying; 0 household industry workers; 1 worker employed in other manufacturing, processing, service, and repair roles; 0 construction workers; 1 employed in trade and commerce; 0 employed in transport, storage, and communications; and 2 in other services.
