= Asura, Gauriganj =

Asura
- Village
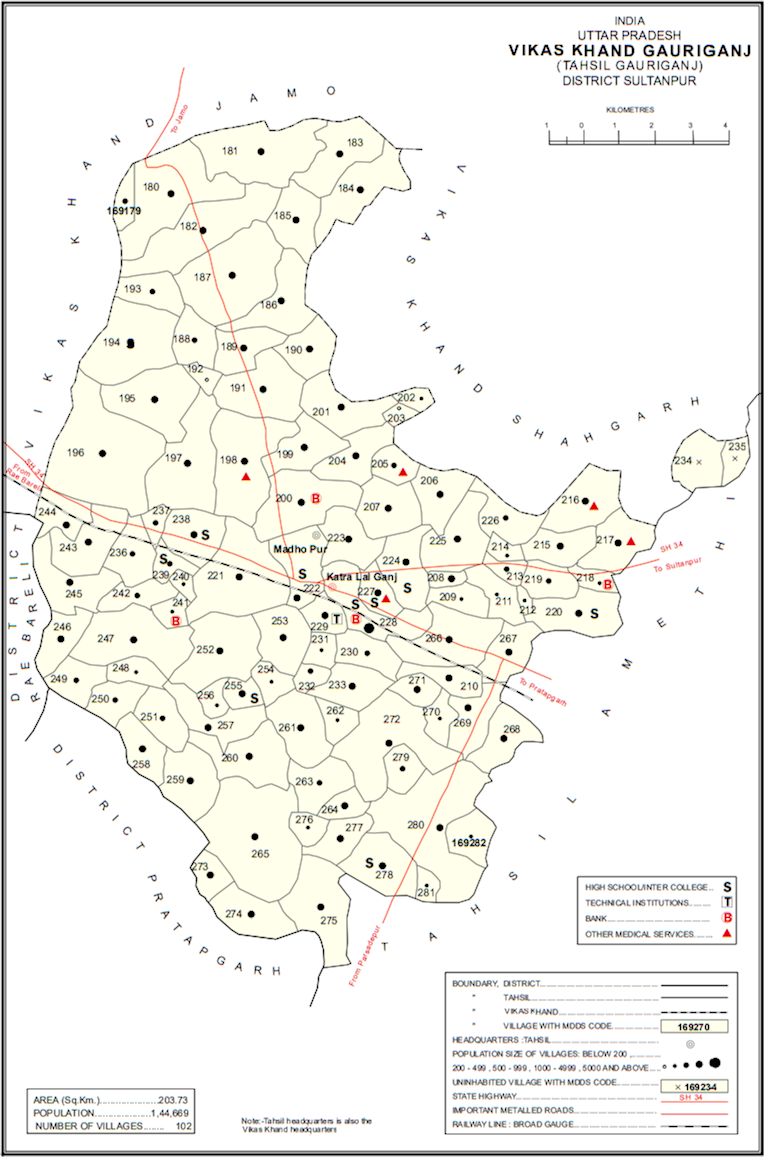
- Map showing Asura (#249) in Gauriganj CD block

- Location in Uttar Pradesh, India
- Coordinates: 26.18895°N 81.617157°E
- Country: India
- State: Uttar Pradesh
- Division: Ayodhya
- District: Amethi

Area
  - Total: 1.231 km^{2} (0.475 sq mi)

Population (2011)
  - Total: 803
  - Density: 652/km^{2} (1,690/sq mi)

Languages
  - Official: Hindi, Urdu
- Time zone: UTC+5:30 (IST)

Asura is a village in Gauriganj block of Amethi district, Uttar Pradesh, India. As of 2011, it has a population of 803 people, in 140 households. It has one primary school and no healthcare facilities and does not host a permanent market or weekly haat. It belongs to the nyaya panchayat of Semuai.

The 1951 census recorded Asura as comprising 2 hamlets, with a total population of 323 people (161 male and 162 female), in 63 households and 61 physical houses. The area of the village was given as 297 acres. 5 residents were literate, all male. The village was listed as belonging to the pargana of Amethi and the thana of Gauriganj .

The 1961 census recorded Asura as comprising 2 hamlets, with a total population of 374 people (175 male and 199 female), in 79 households and 77 physical houses. The area of the village was given as 298 acres.

The 1981 census recorded Asura as having a population of 457 people, in 91 households, and having an area of 113.32 hectares. The main staple foods were listed as wheat and rice.

The 1991 census recorded Asura as having a total population of 545 people (260 male and 285 female), in 100 households and 100 physical houses. The area of the village was listed as 116.00 hectares. Members of the 0-6 age group numbered 97, or 18% of the total; this group was 53% male (51) and 47% female (46). Members of scheduled castes numbered 62, or 11% of the village's total population, while no members of scheduled tribes were recorded. The literacy rate of the village was 45% (148 men and 54 women, counting only people age 7 and up). 155 people were classified as main workers (all men), while 0 people were classified as marginal workers; the remaining 390 residents were non-workers. The breakdown of main workers by employment category was as follows: 103 cultivators (i.e. people who owned or leased their own land); 48 agricultural labourers (i.e. people who worked someone else's land in return for payment); 0 workers in livestock, forestry, fishing, hunting, plantations, orchards, etc.; 0 in mining and quarrying; 0 household industry workers; 1 worker employed in other manufacturing, processing, service, and repair roles; 0 construction workers; 0 employed in trade and commerce; 1 employed in transport, storage, and communications; and 2 in other services.
