= Rakesh Pandey =

Rakesh Pandey may refer to:

- Rakesh Pandey (actor) (1948–2025), Indian actor
- Rakesh Pandey (author) (born 1968), Indian writer and author
- Rakesh Pandey (UP politician) (born 1952), Uttar Pradesh politician and MP
- Rakesh Pandey (Punjab politician) (born 1955), Punjab politician
