= Tejbhan Singh =

Indian politician (1942/1943–2026)

Member of the Uttar Pradesh Legislative Assembly
- In office 1977–1980
- Succeeded by: Rajpati Devi
- Constituency: Gauriganj Assembly constituency

Member of the Uttar Pradesh Legislative Assembly
- In office 1991–2002
- Preceded by: Rajpati Devi
- Succeeded by: Noor Mohammad
- Constituency: Gauriganj Assembly constituency

Personal details
- Born: 1942 or 1943
- Died: July 4, 2026 (aged 83) Lucknow, Uttar Pradesh, India
- Party: Bharatiya Janata Party
- Occupation: Politician

Tejbhan Singh (Hindi: तेजभान सिंह; Hindi pronunciation: [t̪eːd͡ʒ.bʱaːn sɪ̃ŋɦ]; 1942 or 1943 – 4 July 2026), also known as Dada, was an Indian politician associated with the Bharatiya Janata Party. He served as a four-term Member of the Uttar Pradesh Legislative Assembly, representing the Gauriganj Assembly constituency in Amethi district.

== Early life and career ==
During his youth, he worked as a full-time volunteer (Pracharak) of the Rashtriya Swayamsevak Sangh. He later joined the Bharatiya Jana Sangh.

Singh was elected to the Uttar Pradesh Legislative Assembly from the Gauriganj constituency in the 1977 assembly election as a Janata Party candidate. He later joined the Bharatiya Janata Party and was re-elected from Gauriganj in the 1991, 1993 and 1996 assembly elections.

He also served as State Vice President of the BJP Kisan Morcha, the party's farmers' wing. Ahead of the 2017 Uttar Pradesh Legislative Assembly election, the BJP did not nominate Singh from Gauriganj. He subsequently did not contest the election and remained associated with the party.

== Personal life and death ==
Singh remained unmarried throughout his life. He died on 4 July 2026, at the age of 83, while undergoing treatment at Max Super Speciality Hospital in Lucknow following a prolonged illness.

His funeral was held in his native village of Achalpur, on 5 July, with state honours, during which the police accorded him a guard of honour. The ceremony was attended by political leaders including Gauriganj MLA Rakesh Pratap Singh, former Union Minister Smriti Irani, and BJP leader Harish Dwivedi. Condolences were expressed by Rahul Gandhi, Smriti Irani, Keshav Prasad Maurya, Yogi Adityanath, and Akhilesh Yadav.
