= Adhanpur =

Village in Uttar Pradesh, India

Coordinates: 25.5614°N 81.8784°E

Adhanpur is a big village in the Amethi district of Uttar Pradesh, India. State, India. It belongs to Ayodhya Division. It is located 43 km to the west of District headquarters Sultanpur. 10 km from Musafir Khana. 107 km from State capital Lucknow

Kochhit (3 km), Mahesh Pur (4 km), Dichauli (4 km), Newada (4 km), Thauri (4 km) are the nearby villages to Nara Adhan Pur. Nara Adhan Pur is surrounded by Jamo Tehsil towards west, Jagdishpur Tehsil towards west, Baldirai Tehsil towards East, Milkipur Tehsil towards East.

Jais, Rudauli, Sultanpur, Ayodhya are the nearby cities to Nara Adhan Pur.

This place is in the border of the Sultanpur District and Ayodhya District. Ayodhya District Amaniganj is north of this place.
