= Mokalpur, Uttar Pradesh =

Mokalpur
- Village
- Location in Uttar Pradesh, India Mokalpur (India)
- Coordinates: 26.722°N 82.522°E
- Country: India
- State: Uttar Pradesh
- Division: Faizabad
- Tehsil: Alapur
- Elevation: 92 m (302 ft)

Population (2017)
  - Total: 1,000
  - Density: 2/km^{2} (5.2/sq mi)

Languages
  - Official: Hindi Urdu
- Time zone: UTC+5:30 (IST)
- Postal code: 224143
- Telephone code: +91-5450
- Vehicle registration: UP45 XXXX

Mokalpur is a village in Alapur tehsil of Ambedkar Nagar district in Uttar Pradesh state, India. It belongs to Faizabad division. It is located 30 kilometres (19 mi) east of the District headquarters at Akbarpur, Ambedkar Nagar and 216 kilometres (134 mi) from the state capital at Lucknow.

== Description ==
Mokalpur is situated in Ambedkar Nagar district. Agriculture is the main profession of this village. Hindi is the local language.

The village has a primary school and madrasa.

== Transportation ==
The closest major railway station is Faizabad Junction railway station, 35 kilometres (22 mi) away.
