= Jagdish Piyush =

Indian journalist (1950–2021)

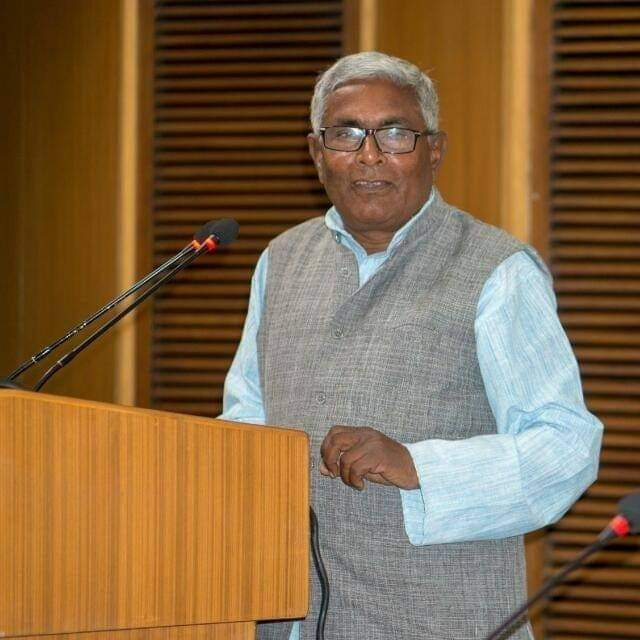
- Born: 6 August 1950; Amethi, Uttar Pradesh, India
- Died: 5 February 2021 (aged 70); Amethi, Uttar Pradesh, India
- Occupations: Journalist; writer; author; educationist; leader
- Writing career
- Notable works: Kisse Awadh Ke; Avadhi Sahitya Sarvekshan Aur Samiksha; Adhunik Sahitya Khand; Rajiv Gandhi Ke Sapno Ka Bharat; Sonia Gandhi Rajneeti Ki Pawitra Ganga

Jagdish Piyush (6 August 1950 – 5 February 2021) was an Indian Hindi writer, a leader of the Indian National Congress and Educationist from Amethi, Uttar Pradesh, India. He was also the media representative of former prime minister Shri Rajiv Gandhi and in 1984, he also gave the slogan of Amethi Ka Danka, Bitiya Priyanka.

He died on 5 February 2021 in Sanjay Gandhi Hospital in Munshiganj Amethi.

== Early life ==
He was born on 6 August 1950 in a simple farmer family of Kasara village of Sangrampur block of Amethi district, lived in the Gauriganj city for the last several decades. He did a great work in the literary world, especially in the field of Awadhi literary creation and was also the editor of Amethi Samachar.

== Literary works ==
Piyush had contributed in Awadhi literature.

- Kisse Awadh Ke
- Avadhi Sahitya Sarvekshan Aur Samiksha
- LOK SAHITYA KE PITAMAH PANDIT RAM NARESH TRIPATHI
- Adhunik Sahitya Khand
- Rajiv Gandhi Ke Sapno Ka Bharat
- Sonia Gandhi Rajneeti Ki Pawitra Ganga
- Gandhi : Gandhi : Gandhi - Balidan Ki Asmapt Gatha
