= Tiloi Assembly constituency =

Constituency of the Uttar Pradesh legislative assembly in India

Tiloi
- Constituency No. 178 for the Uttar Pradesh Legislative Assembly

Constituency details
- Country: India
- Region: North India
- State: Uttar Pradesh
- District: Amethi
- Lok Sabha constituency: Amethi
- Total electors: 3,51,462
- Reservation: None

Member of Legislative Assembly
- 18th Uttar Pradesh Legislative Assembly
- Incumbent Mayankeshwar Sharan Singh
- Party: Bharatiya Janta Party
- Elected year: 2022

Tiloi is a constituency of the Uttar Pradesh Legislative Assembly covering the city of Tiloi in the Amethi district of Uttar Pradesh, India.

== History ==
Tiloi is one of five assembly constituencies in the Amethi Lok Sabha constituency. Since 2008, this assembly constituency is numbered 178 amongst 403 constituencies.

== Members of the Legislative Assembly ==
| Year | Member | Party |
|---|---|---|
| 1967 | Wasi Naqvi | Indian National Congress |
| 1969 | Mohan Singh | Bharatiya Jana Sangh |
| 1974 | Mohan Singh | Indian National Congress |
| 1977 | Mohan Singh | Indian National Congress |
| 1980 | Haji Mohd. Wasim | Indian National Congress |
| 1985 | Haji Mohd. Wasim | Indian National Congress |
| 1989 | Haji Mohd. Wasim | Indian National Congress |
| 1991 | Haji Mohd. Wasim | Indian National Congress |
| 1993 | Mayankeshwar Sharan Singh | Bharatiya Janata Party |
| 1996 | Mohammad Muslim | Samajwadi Party |
| 2002 | Mayankeshwar Sharan Singh | Bharatiya Janata Party |
| 2007 | Mayankeshwar Sharan Singh | Samajwadi Party |
| 2012 | Mohammad Muslim | Indian National Congress |
| 2017 | Mayankeshwar Sharan Singh | Bharatiya Janata Party |
| 2022 | Mayankeshwar Sharan Singh | Bharatiya Janata Party |

== Results ==
=== 2027 ===
2027 Uttar Pradesh Legislative Assembly election: Tiloi
| Party | Candidate | Votes | % | ±% |
|---|---|---|---|---|
| BJP | | | | |
| INDIA | | | | |
| BSP | | | | |
| NOTA | None of the above | | | |
| Majority | | | | |
| Turnout | | | | |
| gain from | | Swing | | |

=== 2022 ===
2022 Uttar Pradesh Legislative Assembly election: Tiloi
| Party | Candidate | Votes | % | ±% |
|---|---|---|---|---|
| BJP | Mayankeshwar Sharan Singh | 99,472 | 48.54 | −0.56 |
| SP | Mohammed Naim | 71,643 | 34.96 | |
| INC | Pradeep Singhal | 21,978 | 10.72 | −7.59 |
| BSP | Raghuvansh Dubey | 6,120 | 2.99 | −23.61 |
| NOTA | None of the Above | 1810 | 0.88 | −0.45 |
| Majority | | 27,829 | 13.58 | −8.92 |
| Turnout | | 204940 | 58.31 | 0.64 |

=== 2017 ===
2017 Uttar Pradesh Legislative Assembly Election: Tiloi
| Party | Candidate | Votes | % | ±% |
|---|---|---|---|---|
| BJP | Mayankeshwar Sharan Singh | 96,119 | 49.1 | |
| BSP | Mohammed Saud Ahmed | 52,072 | 26.6 | |
| INC | Vinod Kumar Mishra | 35,837 | 18.31 | |
| RLD | Mohammed Tabarakh | 1,967 | 1.0 | |
| NOTA | None of the Above | 2567 | 1.33 | |
| Majority | | 44,047 | 22.5 | |
| Turnout | | 195746 | 57.67 | |
