= Mohammad Muslim =

Indian politician (died 2019)

MLA of Tiloi
- In office 1996–2002
- Preceded by: Mayankeshwar Sharan Singh
- Succeeded by: Mayankeshwar Sharan Singh
- In office 2012–2017
- Preceded by: Mayankeshwar Sharan Singh
- Succeeded by: Mayankeshwar Sharan Singh

Personal details
- Died: 29 August 2019
- Party: Bharatiya Janata Party

Mohammad Muslim was an Indian politician belonging to Bharatiya Janata Party. He was elected as a member of Uttar Pradesh Legislative Assembly from Tiloi in 1996 and 2012. He died on 29 August 2019.
