= Suresh Pasi =

Indian politician

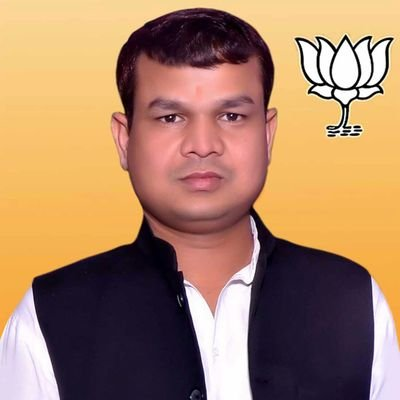

Minister of State Government of Uttar Pradesh
- In office 21 August 2019 – 25 March 2022
- Ministry and Departments: Sugarcane Development; Sugar Mills
- Preceded by: Suresh Rana
- Succeeded by: Sanjay Singh Gangwar
- In office 19 March 2017 – 21 August 2019
- Ministry and Departments: Housing & Development Board; Vocational Education; Skill Development
- Succeeded by: Kapil Dev Aggarwal; Girish Chandra Yadav

Member of Uttar Pradesh Legislative Assembly
- Incumbent
- Assumed office 2017
- Preceded by: Radhey Shyam
- Constituency: Jagdishpur

Personal details
- Born: 15 November 1981 (age 44) Amethi, Uttar Pradesh
- Party: Bharatiya Janata Party

Suresh Kumar Pasi (15 November 1981) is Indian Politician from Uttar Pradesh. He is a member of Uttar Pradesh Legislative Assembly. He is elected from Jagdishpur Assembly constituency in Amethi district representing Bharatiya Janata Party. He served as a minister of state in the Government of Uttar Pradesh.

== Early life and education ==
Pasi was born at Pakargaon village of Tiloi, Amethi on 15 November 1981. He is born into a middle class family. His father Guru Prasad runs a hardware shop in Mohanganj, Uttar Pradesh. His wife, Sarita Devi was Block Pramukh of Tiloi from 2010 to 2015. His father Guru Prasad is a Zilla Panchayat Member of Amethi District. He studied Class 12 at SSPN Inter College, Tiloi and passed the examinations conducted by Uttar Pradesh Madhyamik Shiksha Parishad.

== Career ==
Pasi got the ministries of U.P. Housing and Development Board, Vocational education, skill development.

Pasi won from Jagadishpur Assembly constituency representing Bharatiya Janata Party in the 2022 Uttar Pradesh Legislative Assembly election. He polled 89,315 votes and defeated his nearest rival, Vijay Kumar of the Indian National Congress, by a margin of 22,824 votes. He first became an MLA winning the 2017 Uttar Pradesh Legislative Assembly election defeating Radhey Shyam of the Indian National Congress by a margin of 16,600 votes.

== See also ==
- First Yogi Adityanath ministry
