= Jagdishpur, Uttar Pradesh Assembly constituency =

Constituency of the Uttar Pradesh legislative assembly in India

Coordinates: 26.46°N 81.62°E

Jagdishpur
- Constituency No. 184 for the Uttar Pradesh Legislative Assembly

Constituency details
- Country: India
- Region: North India
- State: Uttar Pradesh
- District: Amethi
- Lok Sabha constituency: Amethi
- Total electors: 3,78,415
- Reservation: SC

Member of Legislative Assembly
- 18th Uttar Pradesh Legislative Assembly
- Incumbent Suresh Pasi
- Party: Bharatiya Janata Party
- Elected year: 2022

Jagdishpur is a constituency of the Uttar Pradesh Legislative Assembly covering the city of Jagdishpur in the Amethi district of Uttar Pradesh, India.

Jagdishpur is one of five assembly constituencies in the Amethi Lok Sabha constituency. Since 2008, this assembly constituency is numbered 184 amongst 403 constituencies.

== Members of the Legislative Assembly ==
| Year | Member | Party |
|---|---|---|
| 1969 | Ram Sevak | Jana Sangh |
| 1974 | Ram Sevak | Indian National Congress |
| 1977 | Ram Pher Kori | Janata Party |
| 1980 | Ram Sevak | Indian National Congress |
| 1985 | Ram Sevak | Indian National Congress |
| 1989 | Ram Sevak | Indian National Congress |
| 1991 | Ram Sevak | Indian National Congress |
| 1993 | Nand Lal | Samajwadi Party |
| 1996 | Ram Lakhan | Bharatiya Janata Party |
| 2002 | Ram Sevak | Indian National Congress |
| 2007 | Ram Sevak | Indian National Congress |
| 2012 | Radhe Shyam | Samajwadi Party |
| 2017 | Suresh Pasi | Bharatiya Janata Party |
| 2022 | Suresh Pasi | Bharatiya Janata Party |

== Election results ==
=== 2027 ===
2027 Uttar Pradesh Legislative Assembly election: Jagdishpur
| Party | Candidate | Votes | % | ±% |
|---|---|---|---|---|
| BJP | | | | |
| INDIA | | | | |
| BSP | | | | |
| NOTA | None of the above | | | |
| Majority | | | | |
| Turnout | | | | |
| gain from | | Swing | | |

=== 2022 ===
2022 Uttar Pradesh Legislative Assembly election: Jagdishpur
| Party | Candidate | Votes | % | ±% |
|---|---|---|---|---|
| BJP | Suresh Pasi | 89,315 | 43.94 | +0.3 |
| INC | Vijay Kumar | 66,491 | 32.71 | −2.33 |
| SP | Vimlesh Kumari | 27,971 | 13.76 | |
| BSP | Jitendar Kumar | 10,198 | 5.02 | −11.22 |
| AAP | Tilak Raj | 1,864 | 0.92 | |
| NOTA | None of the above | 2,060 | 1.01 | −0.62 |
| Majority | | 22,824 | 11.23 | +2.63 |
| Turnout | | 203,268 | 53.72 | +0.37 |
| BJP hold | | Swing | | |

2017 Uttar Pradesh Legislative Assembly Election: Jagdishpu
| Party | Candidate | Votes | % | ±% |
|---|---|---|---|---|
| BJP | Suresh Kumar | 84,219 | 43.64 | |
| INC | Radhe Shyam | 67,619 | 35.04 | |
| BSP | Jagdutt Kori | 31,338 | 16.24 | |
| Most Backward Classes Of India | Tilakraj | 1,865 | 0.97 | |
| NOTA | None of the above | 3,104 | 1.63 | |
| Majority | | 16,600 | 8.6 | |
| Turnout | | 192,972 | 53.35 | |

=== 1993 ===
- Nand Lal (Samajwadi Party) : 37,511 votes
- Daulat Ram (BJP) : 31,161
- Ram Sewak S/o Bhagwandin (Congress) : 10537

=== 1969 ===
- Ram Sewak (BJS) : 13,812 votes
- Inder Pal (INC) : 9774
