= Deepak Singh (politician) =

Indian politician

Member(elect) of Uttar Pradesh Legislative Council
- In office 2016–2022
- Preceded by: Naseeb Pathan Khan, INC

Personal details
- Born: 26 September 1975 (age 51) Gauriganj District Amethi, Uttar Pradesh
- Party: INC
- Education: RML Awadh University, Faizabad
- Occupation: Politician

Deepak Singh is an Indian politician and was a member of the Uttar Pradesh Legislative Council. He is a member of the Indian National Congress.

== Early life ==
Singh was born on 26 September 1975 to Raj Karan Singh at Sewain Hemgarh, Gauriganj of Amethi district in Uttar Pradesh.

== Political career ==
Deepak Singh and his family have a stronghold in the area. While Singh has been elected as head of Block Pramukh twice in the past, He was elected as Block Pramukh from Shahgarh Block, Amethi, Uttar Pradesh in 1995–2005. In order to strength the party at the cadre level he was appointed as the secretary of the party in the year 2002. Deepak Singh was the incharge of Uttar Pradesh Youth Congress and NSUI. It is believed that both the frontals were gained strength during his tenure. Deepak Singh was made Uttar Pradesh Congress General Secretary in (2012-till present).

In 2014, just before Lok Sabha election, Deepak Singh was appointed as chairman of the Union Railway Ministry's PSC with a minister of state status but he resigned from the post soon after the formation of the NDA government at the Centre protesting against hike in rail fare.

In 2016 Uttar Pradesh MLC election Deepak Singh was contesting on Congress Party's ticket the election wasn't a cakewalk, as the party lacked numbers, Singh once again proved his metal by defeating BJP’S Vice President in the 12th Round.

He was appointed as the Chairman of Regulation Committee U.P. Vidhan Parishad on 18 June 2018 Deepak singh was appointed as the leader of upper house of Uttar Pradesh Assembly UP 2018 and is popular among youth and media for constantly exposing the government on various fronts of corruption and ill-governance. Deepak singh has an image of always being available to the party workers.
