= Rakesh Pratap Singh =

Indian politician

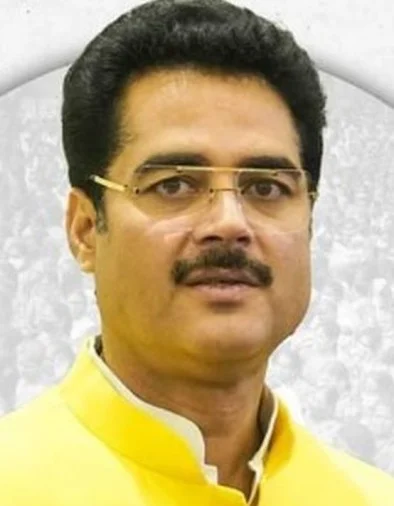

Member of the Legislative Assembly of Uttar Pradesh
- Incumbent
- Assumed office 2012
- Preceded by: Chandra Prakash
- Constituency: Gauriganj

Personal details
- Born: 30 June 1976 (age 50) Mau, Uttar Pradesh, India
- Party: Bharatiya Janata Party (2026-present)
- Other political affiliations: Samajwadi Party (till 2025)
- Spouse: Shilam Singh (m. 1996)
- Children: 2
- Profession: Agriculturalist; industrialist

Rakesh Pratap Singh (born 30 June 1976) is an Indian politician and a member of the 18th Uttar Pradesh Assembly from Gauriganj constituency. Elected as a Samajwadi Party candidate, he won for the first time in the 2012 Uttar Pradesh election, an accomplishment he repeated in 2017. He resigned on 31 October 2021 citing "non-fulfilment of promises" by the government. Singh was expelled from Samajwadi Party in June 2025 for working against party principles and supporting the Bharatiya Janata Party (BJP) in the February 2024 Rajya Sabha elections. In October 2026, Singh formally joined the BJP.

== Personal life ==
Singh was born on 30 June 1976 to Tej Pratap Singh in Mau, Gauriganj of Amethi district in Uttar Pradesh. He completed High School in 1991 from SPIC Raniganj Kaithaula Pratapgarh. Singh married Shilam Singh on 1 June 1996, with whom he has a son and a daughter. He is an agriculturalist and industrialist by profession.

== Political career ==
Singh has served three terms as an MLA in the Uttar Pradesh Legislative Assembly from Gauriganj. In 2012 Uttar Pradesh Legislative Assembly election, he defeated his nearest rival Mohammad Nayeem of Indian National Congress after securing 44,287 votes, succeeding Chandra Prakash of Bahujan Samaj Party in the process. In 2017 Uttar Pradesh Legislative Assembly election, he repeated this by defeating Nayeem again, but with a much larger margin, securing 77,915 votes.

On 31 October 2021, Singh resigned from the 17th Uttar Pradesh Assembly citing "non-fulfilment of promises" by the ruling Bharatiya Janata Party government.

In the 2022 Uttar Pradesh Legislative Assembly election, Singh defeated Bharatiya Janata Party's Chandra Prakash Mishra Matiyari by a margin of 6,963 votes.

In May 2023, Singh was booked for assaulting the husband of Bharatiya Janata Party's Gauriganj municipality chairperson candidate within police premises.

On 23 June 2025, Singh was expelled from Samajwadi Party, alongwith two other members, for working against party principles and voting in favour of the rival BJP in the February 2024 Rajya Sabha elections. The party, however, did not cancel their assembly memberships, rendering them as "unaffiliated MLAs".

On Oct 14, 2026, Singh, along with two other rebel MLAs, joined the Bharatiya Janata Party.
