= Gauriganj Assembly constituency =

Constituency of the Uttar Pradesh legislative assembly in India

Coordinates: 26.21°N 81.68°E

Gauriganj
- Constituency No. 185 for the Uttar Pradesh Legislative Assembly

Constituency details
- Country: India
- Region: North India
- State: Uttar Pradesh
- District: Amethi
- Reservation: None

Member of Legislative Assembly
- 18th Uttar Pradesh Legislative Assembly
- Incumbent Rakesh Pratap Singh
- Party: Independent (BJP supported)
- Elected year: 2022

Gauriganj is a constituency of the Uttar Pradesh Legislative Assembly covering the city of Gauriganj in the Amethi district of Uttar Pradesh, India.

Gauriganj is one of five assembly constituencies in the Amethi Lok Sabha constituency. Since 2008, this assembly constituency is numbered 185 amongst 403 constituencies.

== Members of the Legislative Assembly ==
Election	Name	Party
2017	Rakesh Pratap Singh	Samajwadi Party
2022 (Note: Expelled from Samajwadi Party in 2024.)	Rakesh Pratap Singh	Samajwadi Party

== Election results ==
=== 2027 ===
2027 Uttar Pradesh Legislative Assembly election: Gauriganj
Party	Candidate	Votes	%	±%
BJP				
INDIA				
BSP				
NOTA	None of the above			
Majority				
Turnout				
gain from		Swing		

=== 2022 ===
2022 Uttar Pradesh Legislative Assembly election: Gauriganj
Party	Candidate	Votes	%	±%
SP	Rakesh Pratap Singh	79,040	38.96	+0.21
BJP	Chandra prakash Mishra	72,077	35.53	+23.77
INC	Fateh Mohammed	28,964	14.28	−11.33
BSP	Ramlakhan Pasi	9,872	4.87	−11.97
Jansatta Dal (L)	Chaudhary Nafees Ahamad	7,056	3.48	
NOTA	None of the above	1,920	0.95	+0.37
Majority		6,963	3.43	−9.71
Turnout		202,856	57.94	−1.94
SP hold		Swing		

=== 2017 ===
Samajwadi Party candidate Rakesh Pratap Singh won in 2017 defeating Indian National Congress candidate Mohammad Nayem by a margin of 26,419 votes. On 31 October 2021, Singh resigned from the 17th Uttar Pradesh Assembly citing "non-fulfilment of promises" by the ruling Bharatiya Janata Partygovernment.

2017 Uttar Pradesh Legislative Assembly election: Gauriganj
Party	Candidate	Votes	%	±%
SP	Rakesh Pratap Singh	77,915	38.75	
INC	Mohammad Nayeem	51,496	25.61	
BSP	Vijay Kishor	33,848	16.84	
BJP	Uma Shankar Pandey	23,642	11.76	
RLD	Ravindra Kumar	1,876	0.93	
NOTA	None of the above	1,155	0.58	
Majority		26,419	13.14	
Turnout		201,048	59.88	
