= Mayankeshwar Sharan Singh =

Indian politician

Member of the Uttar Pradesh legislative assembly
- Incumbent
- Assumed office 11 March 2017
- Constituency: Tiloi

MLA, 14th Legislative Assembly
- In office 2002–2007
- Constituency: Tiloi, Amethi district

Personal details
- Born: 17 June 1969 (age 56) Lucknow, Uttar Pradesh, India
- Party: Bharatiya Janata Party (2002–2004, 2017–present); Samajwadi Party (2004–2012)
- Parent: Raja Bahadur Mohan Singh
- Occupation: MLA
- Profession: Politician
- Pretender information
- Title(s): Raja Bahadur of Tiloi
- Throne(s) claimed: Tiloi
- Pretend from: ?–Present
- Monarchy abolished: Sovereign Monarchy; 1947 (Instrument of Accession); Titular Monarchy; 1971 (26th Amendment of the Indian Constitution)
- Last monarch: Raja Bahadur Mohan Singh

Mayankeshwar Sharan Singh is an Indian politician and a member of 17th Uttar Pradesh Assembly of Tiloi of India. He represents the Tiloi constituency of Uttar Pradesh and is a member of the Bharatiya Janata Party.

== Political career ==
A former member of the Samajwadi Party, Singh has been a member of the 14th and 17th Legislative Assemblies of Uttar Pradesh. He was expelled from the BJP in 2004. Since 2002, he has represented the Tiloi constituency and is a member of the BJP. On 26 October 2017, Singh indicated that he may leave the BJP.

== Posts held ==
#	From	To	Position	Comments
01	2017	Incumbent	Member, 17th Legislative Assembly	

== See also ==
- Uttar Pradesh Legislative Assembly
