= Rakesh Pandey (author) =

Indian writer (born 1968)

- Rakesh Pandey (left) presenting British Sarkar Dwara Pratibandhit Sahitya me Gandhi to Ram Nath Kovind (right)
- Born: 27 August 1968; Kasara, Uttar Pradesh, India
- Occupations: Writer, author
- Writing career
- Language: Hindi, Awadhi

Rakesh Pandey (born 27 August 1968) is an Indian writer and editor, primarily in the Hindi and Awadhi languages. He is the founder and editor of the magazine Pravasi Sansar, which focuses on literature, culture, and the Indian diaspora.

== Early life and education ==
Pandey was born on 27 August 1968 in Kasara, a village in Amethi, Uttar Pradesh. He earned his Ph.D. in analytical studies of Awadhi folk Natya and Hindi Natya Kala.

== Career ==
In 2015, Pandey participated in the 10th World Hindi Conference, where he interviewed former Minister of External Affairs, Sushma Swaraj.

Through Pravasi Sansar and other platforms, Pandey has published works on Hindi and Awadhi globally. Under the "Hindi Bachao Manch" banner, he has called for the inclusion of Hindi dialects in Schedule 8 of the Constitution of India.

In 2016, Pravasi Sansar marked its 10th anniversary with an event at the House of Commons in London, hosted by MP Virendra Sharma and attended by former Governor of Goa, Mridula Sinha.

== Literary works ==
=== Publications ===
- Gandhi and Hindi, published by the National Book Trust of the Government of India.
- Gandhi in Literature, published jointly by the National Archives of India and Diamond Books.
- Gandhi and Girmitiya, published by Vani Publications.
- Words of Sunshine, a poetry collection.
- Guide to Indian Premier League: Everything You Wanted to Know About IPL.

=== Other works ===
- Essays on Mauritius as a center of Indian cultural heritage.
- Contributions to studies on Hindi and Indian vernacular literature.
- Advocacy for adding Hindi dialects to the Eighth Schedule of the Indian Constitution.

== Awards ==
- Rotary Hindi Seva Samman (2009) by Rotary Club Delhi.
- Avadh Jyoti Silver Award.
- Deshantar Bhasha Seva Award (2008) by Dushyant Kumar Manuscript Museum, Bhopal.
- World Hindi Samiti Award (New York, USA) for Hindi service.
- Vishisht Hindi Seva Medal by the National Hindi Council.
- Literary Journalism Award by Pt. Ramprasad Bismil Foundation.
- Social, Cultural and National Human Service Award (2007) by the Literary Institution Uddhav.
- Yugin Samman (2006).
- Honor for Hindi service by Swaha, Organization of Hindi of Trinidad and Tobago.
- Sahitya Creation Award by Uttar Pradesh Hindi Sansthan.
