= Amethi district =

District in Uttar Pradesh, India

- District
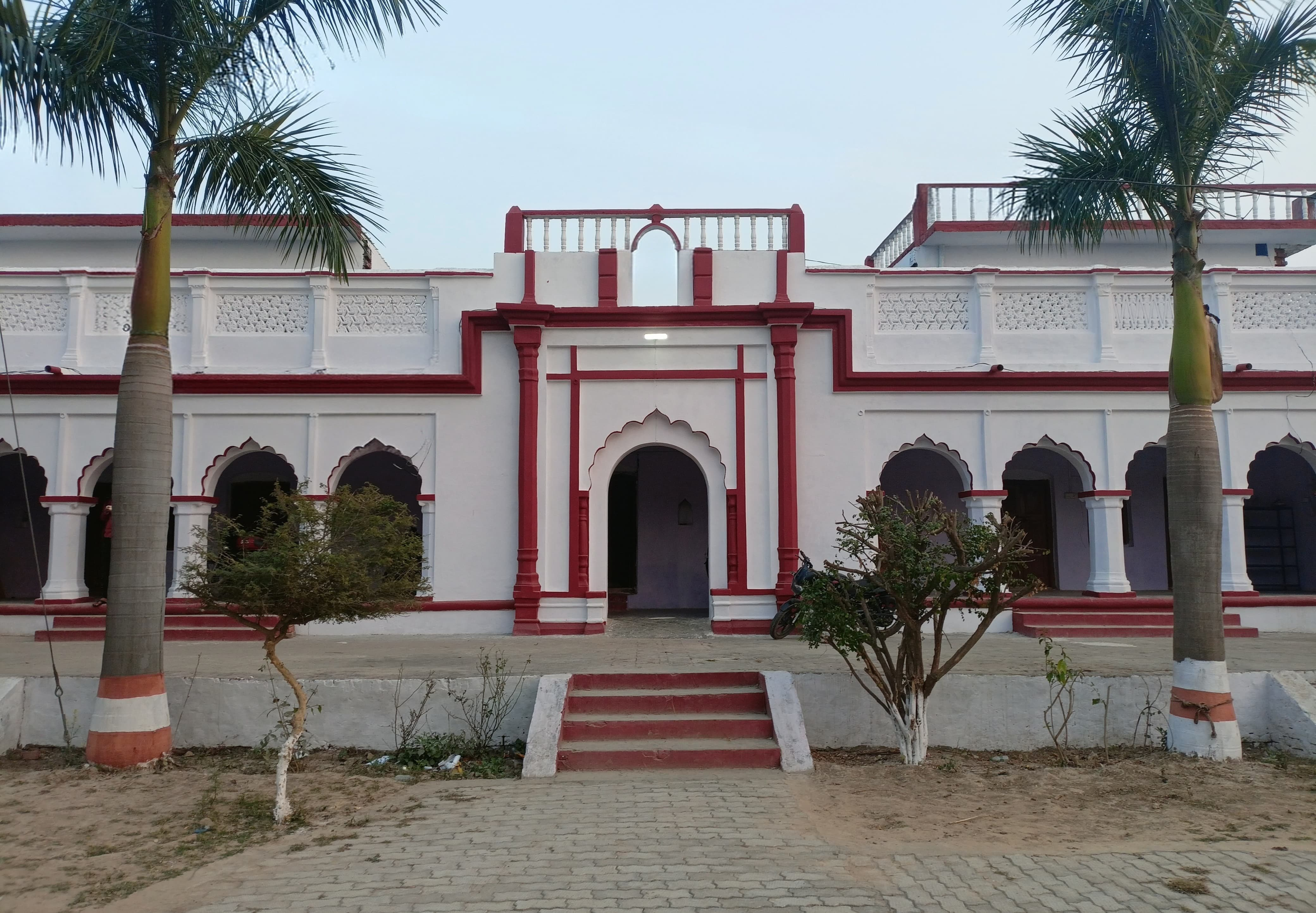
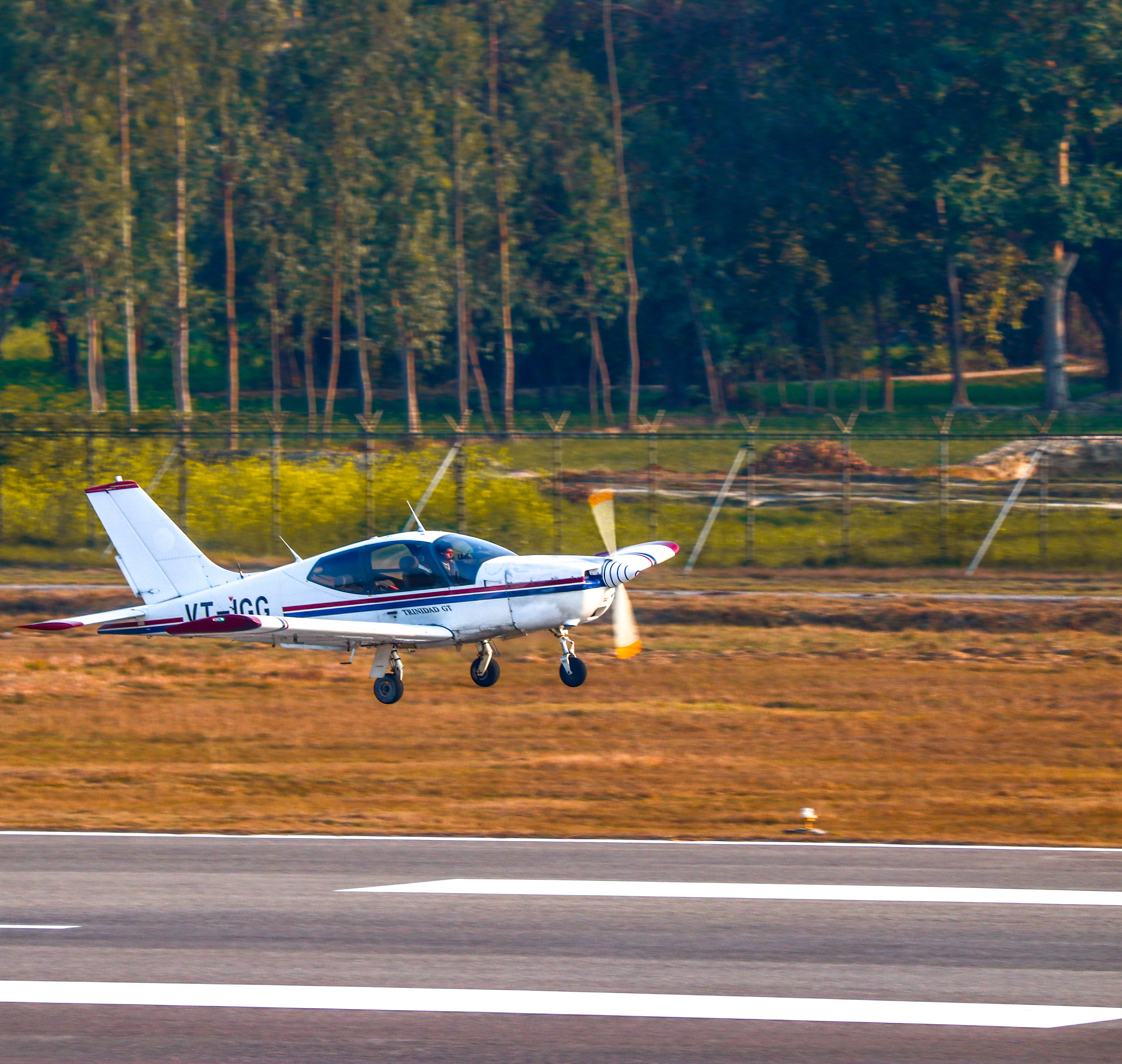
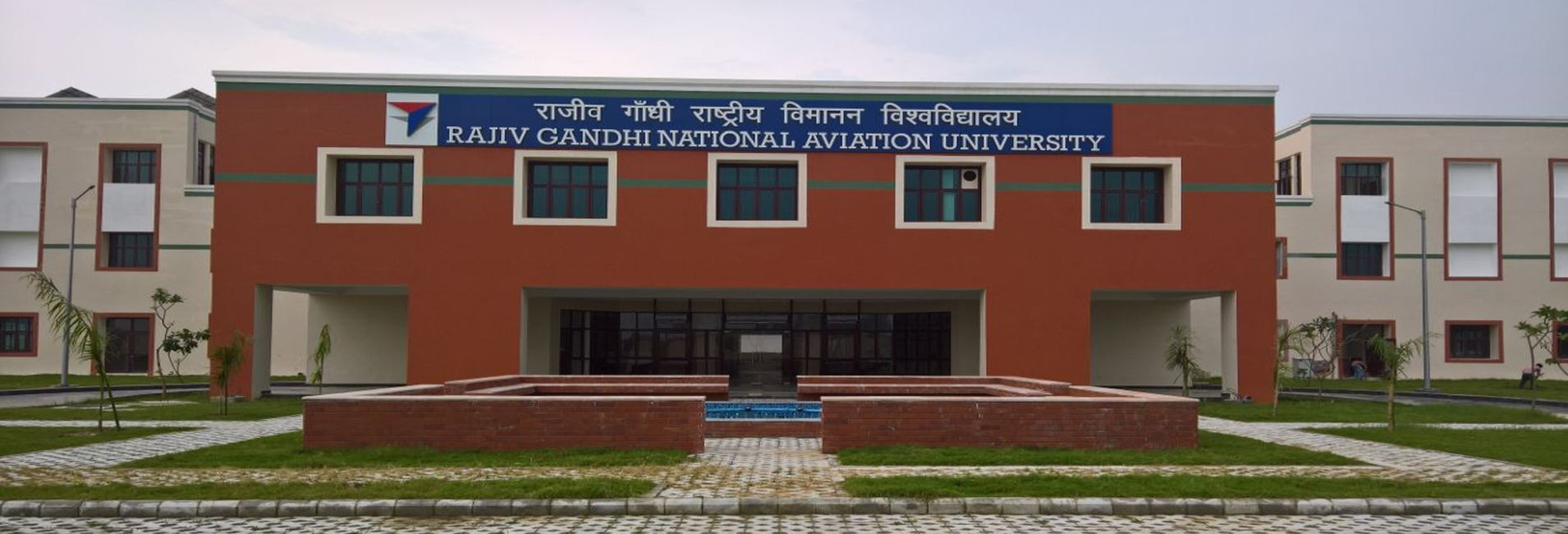
- Palace of Kohra (estate) IGRUA RGIPT Rajiv Gandhi National Aviation University

- Location of Amethi district in Uttar Pradesh
- Coordinates (Amethi): 26°19′N 81°38′E
- Country: India
- State: Uttar Pradesh
- Division: Ayodhya
- District Formation: 1 July 2010; 16 years ago
- Headquarters: Gauriganj

Government
  - Member of Parliament (Lok Sabha): Kishori Lal Sharma, INC
  - Lok Sabha constituency: Amethi (Lok Sabha constituency)
  - Vidhan Sabha constituencies: 1. Amethi; 2. Gauriganj; 3. Jagdishpur; 4. Tiloi
  - District Magistrate: Sanjay Chauhan , IAS
  - Superintendent of Police: Aparna Rajat Kaushik, IPS

Area
  - Total: 2,329.11 km^{2} (899.27 sq mi)

Population
  - Total: 2,050,133
  - Density: 880.222/km^{2} (2,279.76/sq mi)

Demographics
  - Literacy: 59.14% (2011)
  - Sex ratio: 908/1000 ♂/♀
- Time zone: UTC+05:30 (IST)
- Vehicle registration: UP-36
- Airport: Fursatganj Airfield
- Website: amethi.nic.in

Amethi district is a district in the Indian state of Uttar Pradesh. This district is a part of Ayodhya division in the Awadh region of Uttar Pradesh. It covers an area of 2,329.11 km^{2}. Gauriganj is the administrative headquarters of the district. It is widely known for its association with the Nehru-Gandhi political family since 1980. Sanjay Gandhi and Rajiv Gandhi (former Prime Minister), sons of Indira Gandhi, as well as Sonia Gandhi and her son Rahul Gandhi, have, at different times, represented this constituency. . However, this changed in 2019 when Rahul was defeated in the Lok Sabha elections by Smriti Irani of the Bharatiya Janata Party. Irani was defeated in 2024 by Kishori Lal Sharma of the Indian National Congress.

== Overview ==
Amethi was the 72nd district of Uttar Pradesh which came into existence on 1 July 2010 by merging three tehsils of the erstwhile Sultanpur district namely Amethi, Gauriganj and Musafirkhana and two tehsils of the erstwhile Raebareli district, namely, Salon and Tiloi. In 2013, however the Salon sub-district moved from Amethi district back to Raebareli district in Lucknow division.

Amethi is a major town of district and also a municipal board.

=== History ===
Amethi lies on the Raebareli-Amethi-Sultanpur road about 40 km south-west of Sultanpur city. Also called as Raipur-Amethi, of which Raipur belonged to the Raja of Amethi who lived at Ram Nagar. His ancestors used to live in Raipur-Phulwari where the old fort is still found. Here is also a temple called Hanumangarhi and a mosque both built about hundred years ago. About three kilometres north of Ram Nagar there is a tomb of the famous poet Malik Muhammad Jayasi (best remembered for his epic composition Padmavat) where he died, and the fort was built by Bandhalgoti Rajas.

=== Change of status and name ===
Chief minister Mayawati had ordered formation of Chhatrapati Shahuji Maharaj Nagar district on 21 May 2003 but following a change of guard her arch political rival Mulayam Singh Yadav had scrapped it on 23 November the same year. The Chatrapati Shahuji Maharaj Nagar district included within it five tehsils of Sultanpur and Rae Bareli districts which form part of Amethi constituency. In December 2003, a lawyer of Amethi, Uma Shankar Pandey, had challenged the order scrapping the formation of the district in the High Court.

BSP won the 2007 Uttar Pradesh state legislative assembly election and Chief Minister Mayawati ordered the formation of the district again. The district came into existence on 1 July 2010 by merging three tehsils of the erstwhile Sultanpur district, namely, Amethi, Gauriganj and Musafirkhana and two tehsils of the erstwhile Raebareli district, namely, Salon and Tiloi and was named as Chhatrapati Shahuji Maharaj Nagar.

== Demographics ==
Religions in Amethi district (2011)
Religion	Percent
Hinduism	79.26%
Islam	20.06%
Other or not stated	0.68%
Distribution of religions

In the 2011 Indian census used the old district definitions, and so did not list Amethi district. The sub-districts (tehsils) that form Amethi district had the following populations:

Population of the subdistricts that form Amethi district in the 2011 census.
Sub-district name	Population in 2011 census	District at the time of the 2011 census
Amethi	447,330	Sultanpur
Gauriganj	390,935	Sultanpur
Musafirkhana	709,816	Sultanpur
Tiloi	502,052	Rae Bareli
Total	2,050,133	–

Amethi district had a population of 2,050,133. Amethi district had a sex ratio of 976 females per 1000 males and a literacy rate of 59.14%. 79,759 (3.89%) lived in urban areas. Scheduled Castes made up 512,215 (24.98%) of the population.

=== Languages ===
Languages in Amethi district (2011 census)
1. Hindi (81.3%)
2. Awadhi (17.2%)
3. Urdu (1.28%)
4. Others (0.24%)

At the time of the 2011 census, 81.32% of the population spoke Hindi, 17.16% Awadhi and 1.28% Urdu as their first language. The main language in the district is Awadhi but most people return their language as 'Hindi' on the census.

=== Transport ===
Amethi is connected to the major cities in Uttar Pradesh and North-Eastern India via Indian Railways and roads. It has direct trains connecting with major cities like Delhi, Lucknow, Kanpur, Dehradun, Haridwar, Allahabad, Varanasi, Kolkata, Puri, Bhopal, Mumbai and Bangalore. Ayodhya International Airport (84 km [52 mi]) and Prayagraj Airport (104 km [65 mi]) are the nearby airports from Amethi.

A number of Uttar Pradesh State Road Transport Corporation buses ply from Amethi.

== Education ==
=== University and colleges ===
- Rajiv Gandhi Institute of Petroleum Technology,
- Indira Gandhi Rashtriya Uran Akademi,
- Government Medical College, Amethi
- Footwear Design and Development Institute
- Rajiv Gandhi National Aviation University
- Babasaheb Bhimrao Ambedkar University, Satellite Campus, Amethi
- IIIT Tikaemafi, Amethi
- Ranveer Ranjanay Post Graduate College
- Rajarshi Rananjay Singh College Of Pharmacy
- Government Girlas Polytechnic, Amethi
- Sanjay Gandhi Polytechnic
- Rajarshi Rananjay Sinh Institute of Management & Technology (RRSIMT AMETHI), Amethi

== Divisions ==
The district comprises 4 tehsils, 13 development blocks, 14 police stations and 401 lekhpal areas.

The district comprises four Vidhan Sabha constituencies, namely, Gauriganj, Jagdishpur, Amethi and Tiloi. All of these are part of Amethi Lok Sabha constituency. It is surrounded by the constituency districts of Ayodhya, Sultanpur and Barabanki.

== Notable people ==
- Chandrama Devi Agrahari
- Rahul Gandhi (MP)
- Rajiv Gandhi (former Prime Minister of India)
- Sanjay Gandhi (former MP)
- Smriti Irani (former MP and former cabinet minister)
- Malik Muhammad Jayasi (poet, writer)
- Leela Mishra (Indian actress)
- Manoj Muntashir (lyricist)
- Mohammad Muslim (Former MLA)
- Rakesh Pandey (writer and author)
- Suresh Pasi (MLA and former minister)
- Jagdish Piyush (writer, educationist, Indian National Congress politician)
- Gayatri Prasad Prajapati (former MLA and former cabinet minister)
- Maharaji Prajapati (MLA)
- Syed Sibtey Razi (former Governor of Assam, former Governor of Jharkhand, former MP)
- Babu Himmat Sah (Founder ruler of Kohra (estate))
- Kishori Lal Sharma (MP)
- Govind Narayan Shukla (MLC)
- Akshay Pratap Singh (MLC and former MP)
- Ameeta Singh (former MLA)
- Babu Bhoop Singh (Ruler of Kohra (estate) and leader of the Indian Rebellion of 1857)
- Deepak Singh (former MLC)
- Garima Singh (former MLA)
- Pankaj Singh (Indian cricketer)
- Raja Lal Madho Singh (Ruler of Amethi)
- Rakesh Pratap Singh (MLA)
- Ravindra Pratap Singh (former MP and former MLA)
- Rudra Pratap Singh (former MP, former MLA and former MLC)
- Mayankeshwar Sharan Singh (MLA and minister)
- Shailendra Pratap Singh (MLC)
- Tejbhan Singh (Former MLA)
- Sanjaya Sinh (former MP and former cabinet minister)
- Prashant Veer (Indian cricketer)
