= Ayodhya division =

Administrative division of Uttar Pradesh, India

Coordinates: 26°47′N 82°08′E

Ayodhya division

Ayodhya division, formerly and colloquially known as Faizabad division, is one of the 18 administrative geographical units (i.e. division) of the northern Indian state of Uttar Pradesh. Ayodhya city is the administrative headquarters of the division. The government of Uttar Pradesh approved the renaming of the Faizabad division to Ayodhya division in November 2018.

The division currently consists of the following 5 districts:-

- Ambedkar Nagar
- Amethi
- Ayodhya
- Barabanki
- Sultanpur

== Demographics ==
Ayodhya division: mother-tongue of population, according to the 2011 Census.
1. Hindi (81.5%)
2. Awadhi (13.0%)
3. Urdu (4.94%)
4. Others (0.56%)

The 2011 census did not use the new organisation. The districts at the time consisted of Barabanki, Faizabad (now called Ayodhya), Ambedkar Nagar, and Sultanpur. The latter had different sub-districts than now.

Ayodhya division: mother-tongue of population, according to the 2011 Census.
Mother tongue code	Mother tongue	Districts				Ayodhya division	
Mother tongue code	Mother tongue	Bara Banki	Ayodhya	Ambedkar Nagar	Sultanpur	Total people	Percentage
002007	Bengali	635	584	303	597	2,119	0.02%
004001	Dogri	0	831	0	0	831	0.01%
006030	Awadhi	68,876	333,602	256,822	888,371	1,547,671	12.98%
006102	Bhojpuri	2,141	804	39,100	2,889	44,934	0.38%
006142	Chhattisgarhi	217	788	490	2,700	4,195	0.04%
006240	Hindi	2,984,773	2,050,978	1,905,077	2,781,822	9,722,650	81.52%
015043	Odia	84	557	504	628	1,773	0.01%
016038	Punjabi	1,199	763	362	887	3,211	0.03%
019014	Sindhi	0	2,432	4	28	2,464	0.02%
022015	Urdu	200,893	77,484	193,932	116,980	589,289	4.94%
028001	Arabic/Arbi	170	38	474	391	1,073	0.01%
040001	English	763	53	42	39	897	0.01%
–	Others	948	2,082	778	1,785	5,593	0.05%
Total		3,260,699	2,470,996	2,397,888	3,797,117	11,926,700	100.00%
