= Lambhua Assembly constituency =

Constituency of the Uttar Pradesh legislative assembly in India

Coordinates: 26.14°N 82.23°E

Lambhua
- Constituency No. 190 for the Uttar Pradesh Legislative Assembly

Constituency details
- Country: India
- Region: North India
- State: Uttar Pradesh
- District: Sultanpur
- Established: 2012
- Total electors: 3,69,085
- Reservation: None

Member of Legislative Assembly
- 18th Uttar Pradesh Legislative Assembly
- Incumbent Sitaram Verma
- Party: Bharatiya Janta Party
- Elected year: 2022

Lambhua is a constituency of the Uttar Pradesh Legislative Assembly comprising Lambhua tehsil, in Sultanpur district, Uttar Pradesh, India. Lambhua is one of five assembly constituencies in the Sultanpur bidhan Sabha constituency. Since 2003, this assembly constituency is numbered 190 amongst 403 constituencies. It had its first election in 2012 and its current representative is Sitaram Verma of the Bharatiya Janta Party.

== Members of the Legislative Assembly ==
Election	Name	Party
2012	Santosh Pandey	Samajwadi Party
2017	Devmani Dwivedi	Bharatiya Janata Party
2022	Sitaram Verma	Bharatiya Janata Party

== Election results ==
=== 2027 ===
2027 Uttar Pradesh Legislative Assembly election: Lambhua
Party	Candidate	Votes	%	±%
INDIA				
NDA				
BSP	Shailendra Kumar Singh			
NOTA	None of the above			
Majority				
Turnout				
gain from		Swing		

=== 2022 ===
2022 Uttar Pradesh Legislative Assembly election: Lambhua
Party	Candidate	Votes	%	±%
BJP	Sitaram Verma	82,999	39.37	▲0.39
SP	Santosh Pandey	73,466	34.85	▲11.23
BSP	Avansh Kumar Singh	42,119	19.98	▼12.61
Jan Adhikar Party	Islam Ali	2,548	1.21	
INC	Vinay Vikram Singh	1,930	0.92	
NOTA	None of the above	1,686	0.8	▼0.09
Majority		9,533	4.52	▼1.87
Turnout		210,835	57.12	▼0.35
BJP hold		Swing		

2017 Uttar Pradesh Legislative Assembly Election: Lambhua
Party	Candidate	Votes	%	±%
BJP	Devmani Dwivedi	78,627	38.98	
BSP	Vinod Singh	65,724	32.59	
SP	Santosh Pandey	47,633	23.62	
NOTA	None of the above	1,785	0.89	
Majority		12,903	6.39	
Turnout		201,692	57.47	
