= Sitaram Verma =

Indian politician

Member of 17th Uttar Pradesh Legislative Assembly
- In office March 2017 – March 2022
- Succeeded by: Raj Prasad Upadhyay
- Constituency: Sadar

Member of 18th Uttar Pradesh Legislative Assembly
- Incumbent
- Assumed office March 2022
- Preceded by: Devmani Dwivedi
- Constituency: Lambhua

Personal details
- Born: 1948 (age 77–78) Sultanpur, Uttar Pradesh
- Party: Bharatiya Janata Party
- Spouse: Pushpa Verma
- Parent: Shivnath Verma (father)
- Occupation: Politician

Sitaram Verma is an Indian politician currently serving as a member of the 18th Uttar Pradesh Assembly. He is a member of the Bharatiya Janata Party and represents the Lambhua Assembly constituency from Sultanpur district.

He previously served as a member of the 17th Uttar Pradesh Assembly, representing the Sadar Assembly constituency.

== Political career ==
Following the 2022 Uttar Pradesh Legislative Assembly election he was elected as an MLA from the Lambhua Assembly constituency after defeating Samajwadi Party (SWP) candidate Santosh Pandey by a margin of 95,33 votes.

== Personal life ==
Sitaram Verma was born to Shivnath Verma and his wife in Sultanpur in 1948 in a family. Sitaram is married to Pushpa Verma and lives with his family of six in Lucknow.
