= Maksudan =

Coordinates: 26°11′N 82°14′E

- village
- Interactive map of Maksudan
- Country: India
- State: Uttar Pradesh
- District: Sultanpur
- Elevation: 90 m (300 ft)

Population (2008)
  - Total: 2,200

Languages
  - Official: Hindi
- Time zone: UTC+5:30 (IST)
- Website: www.maksudan.com

Maksudan is a village on the bank of the Gomti River near Dhopap in Lambhua Mandal, Sultanpur district, Uttar Pradesh.

== Geography ==
Total population of the village is approx 10000 with 5500 male and 4500 female. Maksudan is located 5 km distance from its Mandal Main Town Lambhua. It is 25 km from its district main city Sultanpur and 155 km from the capital Lucknow. Nearby villages of this village with distance are Narendrapur (0.6 km), Rampur (2 km), Shobhipur (2.2 km), Mampur (1.8 km), Dhopap (2.9 km). Nearest Towns are Bhadiyan (9.4 km), Lambhua (5 km), Chanda (15 km), Dhopap (3 km).

Zafrapur, Jiyanpur, Mishrapur, Ralhi ka Pura, Kharahna are the villages along with this village in the same Lambhua Mandal.
