= Raj Prasad Upadhyay =

Member of the Uttar Pradesh Legislative Assembly

Member of Uttar Pradesh Legislative Assembly
- Incumbent
- Assumed office March 2022
- Preceded by: Sitaram Verma
- Constituency: Sadar

Personal details
- Born: 20 January 1959 (age 67) Sultanpur, Uttar Pradesh
- Party: Bharatiya Janata Party
- Parent: Narayan Upadhyay (father)
- Profession: Politician

Raj Prasad Upadhyay is an Indian politician and a member of the 18th Uttar Pradesh Assembly from the Sadar Assembly constituency of the Sultanpur district. He is a member of the Bharatiya Janata Party.

== Early life ==
Raj Prasad Upadhyay was born on 20 January 1959 in Sultanpur, Uttar Pradesh, to a Hindu family of Ish Narayan Upadhyay. He married Shiv Kumari on 11 May 1981, and they have two children.

== See also ==
- 18th Uttar Pradesh Assembly
- Uttar Pradesh Legislative Assembly
- Sadar Assembly constituency
