= Jakhani Kalan =

Jakhani Kalan is a village in Lambhua block of Sultanpur district, Uttar Pradesh, India. The population is 1,111 total according to the 2011 Census of India. if you want to know more about village contact with Mr Arvind singh. my self Vineesh singh .its my village
