= Purebaghrai =

Purebaghrai is situated in Lambhua tehsil, Sultanpur district, Uttar Pradesh, India. It is one of 453 villages in Lambhua Block, along with villages like Narayanpur and Bharthipur. The nearest railway station to Purebaghray is in Lambhua.
