= Jai Bhadra Singh =

Indian politician

Member of Parliament, Lok Sabha
- In office 1999–2004
- Preceded by: Devendra Bahadur Roy
- Succeeded by: Mohammad Tahir Khan
- Constituency: Sultanpur, Uttar Pradesh

Personal details
- Born: 1 November 1953
- Party: Bahujan Samaj Party
- Spouse: Asha Singh
- Children: 3

Jai Bhadra Singh is an Indian politician. He was elected to the Lok Sabha, the lower house of the Parliament of India from the Sultanpur, Uttar Pradesh as a member of the Bahujan Samaj Party.
