= Sultanpur Lok Sabha constituency =

Lok Sabha Constituency in Uttar Pradesh

Coordinates: 26.26°N 82.07°E

Sultanpur UP-44
- Lok Sabha constituency
- Interactive Map Outlining Sultanpur Lok Sabha constituency

Constituency details
- Country: India
- Region: North India
- State: Uttar Pradesh
- Assembly constituencies: Isauli; Sultanpur; Sadar; Lambhua; Kadipur
- Established: 1952-present
- Reservation: None

Member of Parliament
- 18th Lok Sabha
- Incumbent Rambhual Nishad
- Party: Samajwadi Party
- Elected year: 2024

Sultanpur is a Lok Sabha parliamentary constituency in Uttar Pradesh.

== Assembly segments ==
No	Name	District	Member	Party	2024 Lead
187	Isauli	Sultanpur	Mohammad Tahir Khan	SP	SP
188	Sultanpur	Sultanpur	Vinod Singh	BJP	SP
189	Sadar	Sultanpur	Raj Prasad Upadhyay	BJP	SP
190	Lambhua	Sultanpur	Sitaram Verma	BJP	SP
191	Kadipur (SC)	Sultanpur	Rajesh Gautam	BJP	BJP

== Members of Parliament ==
Year	Member	Party
1952	B. V. Keskar	Indian National Congress
1957	Govind Malviya	Indian National Congress
1962	Kunawr Krishna Verma	Indian National Congress
1967	Ganpat Sahai	Indian National Congress
1971	Kedar Nath Singh	Indian National Congress
1977	Zulfiquarulla	Janata Party
1980	Giriraj Singh	Indian National Congress (I)
1984	Raj Karan Singh	Indian National Congress
1989	Ram Singh	Janata Dal
1991	Vishwanath Das Shastri	Bharatiya Janata Party
1996	Devendra Bahadur Roy	Bharatiya Janata Party
1998	Devendra Bahadur Roy	Bharatiya Janata Party
1999	Jai Bhadra Singh	Bahujan Samaj Party
2004	Tahir Khan	Bahujan Samaj Party
2009	Sanjaya Sinh	Indian National Congress
2014	Varun Gandhi	Bharatiya Janata Party
2019	Maneka Gandhi	Bharatiya Janata Party
2024	Rambhual Nishad	Samajwadi Party

== Election results ==
=== 2024 ===
2024 Indian general election: Sultanpur
Party	Candidate	Votes	%	±%
SP	Rambhual Nishad	444,330	43.00	▲43.00
BJP	Maneka Gandhi	4,01,156	38.82	▼7.09
BSP	Uday Raj Verma	1,63,025	15.78	▼28.65
NOTA	None of the above	8,513	0.82	▼0.16
Majority		43,174	4.18	▲2.72
Turnout		10,33,387	55.78	▼0.59
SP gain from BJP		Swing		

=== 2019 ===
2019 Indian general elections: Sultanpur
Party	Candidate	Votes	%	±%
BJP	Maneka Gandhi	459,196	45.91	▲3.39
BSP	Chandra Bhadra Singh	4,44,670	44.43	▲20.95
INC	Dr. Sanjay Sinh	41,681	4.17	▼0.18
PSP(L)	Kamla Yadav	31,494	3.15	▲3.15
NOTA	None of the Above	9,771	0.98	▲0.42
Majority		14,526	1.46	▼17.08
Turnout		10,20,764	56.37	▼0.22
BJP hold		Swing	▲3.39	

=== General election 2014 ===
2014 Indian general elections: Sultanpur
Party	Candidate	Votes	%	±%
BJP	Feroze Varun Gandhi	4,10,348	42.52	+36.24
BSP	Pawan Pandey	2,31,446	23.98	−4.50
SP	Shakeel Ahmed	2,28,144	23.64	+8.40
INC	Ameeta Sinh	41,983	4.35	−38.09
IND.	Varun Gandhi	14,021	1.45	+1.45
NOTA	None of the Above	5,412	0.56	+0.56
Majority		1,78,902	18.54	+4.58
Turnout		9,65,310	56.66	+7.19
BJP gain from INC		Swing	+0.08	

=== General election 2009 ===
2009 Indian general election: Sultanpur
Party	Candidate	Votes	%	±%
INC	Dr. Sanjay Singh	3,00,411	42.44	
BSP	Mohammad Tahir	2,01,632	28.48	
SP	Ashok Pandey	1,07,895	15.24	
BJP	Surya Bhan Singh	44,425	6.28	
IND.	Jhinkuram Vishwakarma	8,903	1.26	
Majority		98,779	13.96	
Turnout		7,07,855	49.47	
INC gain from BSP		Swing		

=== General election 2004 ===
2004 Indian general election: Sultanpur
Party	Candidate	Votes	%	±%
BSP	Mohd. Tahir	261,564	36.28	
SP	Shailendra Pratap Singh	159,754	22.16	
INC	Captain Satish Sharma	154,245	21.39	
BJP	Veena Pandey	91,328	12.66	
IND	Sarvendra Veer Vikram	14,628	2.02	{{{change}}}
Majority		101,810	14.12	{{{change}}}
Turnout		721,049	{{{percentage}}}	{{{change}}}
BSP hold		Swing	{{{swing}}}	

=== General election 1999 ===
1999 Indian general election: Sultanpur
Party	Candidate	Votes	%	±%
BSP	Jai Bhadra Singh	173,558	28.43	
SP	Ram Lakhan Verma	158,959	26.04	
Independent	Pawan Kumar Pandey	129,525	21.21	
INC	Deepa Kaul	82,385	13.49	
Majority		14,599	2.39	
Turnout		610,404	52.10	
BSP hold		Swing		

== See also ==
- Sultanpur
- List of constituencies of the Lok Sabha
