= Jaisinghpur, Sultanpur =

Jaisinghpur
- Village
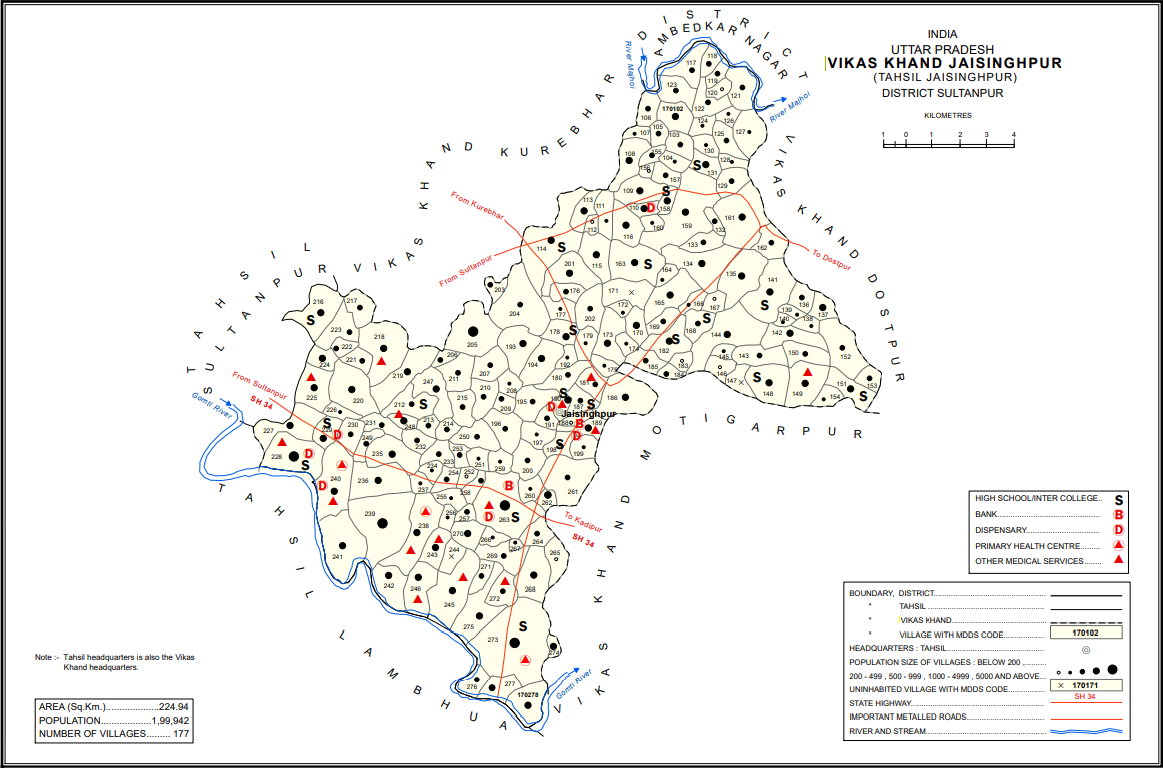
- Map showing Jaisinghpur (#190) in Jaisinghpur CD block

- Location in Uttar Pradesh, India
- Coordinates: 26.286638°N 82.239521°E
- Country: India
- State: Uttar Pradesh
- Division: Ayodhya
- District: Sultanpur

Area
  - Total: 0.719 km^{2} (0.278 sq mi)

Population (2011)
  - Total: 2,211
  - Density: 3,080/km^{2} (7,960/sq mi)

Languages
  - Official: Hindi, Urdu
- Time zone: UTC+5:30 (IST)

Jaisinghpur is a village and tehsil headquarters in Sultanpur district, Uttar Pradesh, India. As of 2011, it has a population of 2,211 people, in 353 households. It has 4 primary schools and one hospital. It hosts a haat on Tuesdays and Saturdays mostly dealing in tat patti. It serves as the headquarters of a nyaya panchayat which also includes 23 other villages. It is also the seat of a community development block, which was inaugurated in 1953.

== History ==
At the turn of the 20th century, Jaisinghpur was described as a poor village, with narrow, twisting streets. It formed part of the taluqdari estate of the Raja of Hasanpur, serving as a tehsil within the estate. It had a small bazar, where a small sugar refining industry took place, but at that time the sugar refiners were struggling because of competition from beet sugar. Jaisinghpur also had a police station and an upper primary school which was not attended by many students. It was connected by a minor rail line to Sultanpur in one direction and Dostpur in the other. As of 1901, Jaisinghpur had a population of 909.

The 1951 census recorded Jaisinghpur (as "Jaisinghpur Kalan") as comprising 2 hamlets, with a total population of 892 people (482 male and 410 female), in 192 households and 180 physical houses. The area of the village was given as 178 acres. 55 residents were literate, all male. The village was listed as belonging to the pargana of Baraunsa and the thana of Jaisinghpur.

The 1961 census recorded Jaisinghpur (as "Jaisinghpur Kalan") as comprising 2 hamlets, with a total population of 1,001 people (524 male and 477 female), in 238 households and 215 physical houses. The area of the village was given as 183 acres and it had a medical practitioner, maternity and child welfare centre, and post office at that point. Its police force consisted of 2 sub-inspectors, 1 head constable, and 14 constables. Average attendance of the twice-weekly haat was about 150 people.

The 1981 census recorded Jaisinghpur as having a population of 1,360 people, in 252 households, and having an area of 72.04 hectares. The main staple foods were listed as wheat and rice.

The 1991 census recorded Jaisinghpur as having a total population of 1,610 people (838 male and 772 female), in 235 households and 234 physical houses. The area of the village was listed as 72.04 hectares. Members of the 0-6 age group numbered 290, or 18% of the total; this group was 46% male (132) and 54% female (158). Members of scheduled castes numbered 374, or 23% of the village's total population, while no members of scheduled tribes were recorded. The literacy rate of the village was 41.5% (289 men and 259 women, counting only people age 7 and up). 362 people were classified as main workers (359 men and 3 women), while 0 people were classified as marginal workers; the remaining 1,248 residents were non-workers. The breakdown of main workers by employment category was as follows: 139 cultivators (i.e. people who owned or leased their land); 105 agricultural labourers (i.e. people who worked someone else's land in return for payment); 0 workers in livestock, forestry, fishing, hunting, plantations, orchards, etc.; 0 in mining and quarrying; 34 household industry workers; 1 worker employed in other manufacturing, processing, service, and repair roles; 0 construction workers; 21 employed in trade and commerce; 1 employed in transport, storage, and communications; and 61 in other services.

== Villages ==
Jaisinghpur CD block has the following 177 villages:

Village name	Total land area (hectares)	Population (in 2011)
Amdeva	149	1,405
Bahali	106	595
Nagaipur	53.7	369
Isur	46.3	689
Konchi	96.1	609
Tamoli Pur	46.6	228
Gudbad	112.8	1,264
Devpara Par	104.6	1,010
Chand Pur	124.9	1,142
Para	98	357
Dubepur	22	117
Bhikhupur	102.9	1,052
Pidhi	406.5	2,769
Bhidura	137.5	1,126
Visundas Pur	129.3	1,182
Sonupara	115	625
Virmalpur	50	509
Kathoutiya	45	506
Kandipur	32	91
Sarayjehali	98	900
Dadawa	88.7	794
Kilhapur	132	635
Madhopur	44.5	318
Baharpur	118.2	637
Lhouta	44.8	483
Kataka	117.8	376
Chakshura	46.7	347
Sadarpur	91	918
Mariharpur	51.2	463
Sisouda	76.3	1,991
Jayainghpur Khurd	50.9	687
Moukedih	91.6	660
Savai	383.8	2,833
Nidura	223.6	1,056
Saraynaurang	84.9	647
Choure	83.2	1,145
Bharsare	50.8	342
Holepur	32.5	290
Gouhaniyan	36.9	210
Birsinghpur	295.5	2,923
Bhairopur	171.2	2,409
Khajuri	74.9	939
Bhabhot	369	3,348
Hansarampur	30.2	278
Domanpur	80.1	127
Faijullapur	47.6	0
Paigapur	223.7	1,254
Vibharpur	186.1	1,155
Rupinpur	91.6	721
Vinwan	120.6	1,155
Bhawanipur	213.4	994
Saraiya	178.5	726
Khemapur	63.6	415
Bewapar	67.6	932
Laxmipatti	18.2	4
Sumerpur (Mahamodpur)	74.2	967
Mahamudpur Salahpur	128.5	1,201
Mahamudpur Semari	338.3	3,275
Chiranedih	57.5	494
Chorama	311	1,965
Siyarabhari	89	770
Kareban	264	1,462
Kalyanpur	56.8	250
Parsoha	203.5	2,279
Udaypur	39.6	253
Bhanpur	47.1	121
Sapahi	119	529
Umari	83.3	631
Karsa	101.4	1,381
Lathawa	43.6	0
Bhojapur	29.4	237
Amliyashikara	306.2	2,162
Uthaghanpur	57.4	277
Barua	68.4	332
Surapur	64.6	732
Bevtari	98.5	460
Muili	116.2	1,102
Choubepur	63.5	336
Barsoma	147.1	951
Domanpur	77.2	680
Numayen	162.1	1,464
Ramapur	39.6	107
Lakhanpur	58	783
Madai	100.1	568
Gangev	257.1	2,759
Bagiyagown	70.1	948
Karnaipur	35.3	189
Sadarpur	105.7	1,180
Jaysinghpur (block headquarters)	71.9	2,211
Mokalpur	36.2	838
Ashapur	37	304
Purushottampur	200.4	1,492
Sata	136.1	1,210
Masirpur	141.1	967
Padarathpur	139.1	568
Bhiti	86	335
Kandhapur	62.8	481
Chandanpur	50.7	292
Gopalpur	122	774
Ravaniya	225.2	1,823
Sevtari	144.2	899
Saraiya	79	978
Vinchhekoilaha	183.6	797
Mungar	282.8	5,098
Ramchandarpur	43.8	585
Sartejpur	107.5	722
Jagatpur	64	390
Viraipur	55	535
Basakpur	126.3	848
Alavalpur	122.8	902
Saidpur	139.2	873
Pipara	75.4	804
Nevada	45.6	630
Doulatpur	126.5	974
Salarpur	194.1	1,833
Alahadadpur	105	855
Vaidaha	311.1	2,966
Fajilpur	219.4	1,677
Ganeshpur Kaithouli	262	3,442
Jvalipur	39.4	604
Vaidpur	38.5	500
Basounha	137.1	885
Isahakpur	91.3	1,398
Jolimirganj	208.1	2,216
Karnaipur	55.6	403
Denva	61.8	1,088
Phtahpur	428.3	6,560
Rajapur	67.3	1,773
Biri	78.3	786
Ajijpur	103	896
Tolva	81.6	599
Sahadatpur	58.3	950
Sahupara	62.5	407
Randouli	186.1	2,847
Madhvpur Chhitouna	237.2	1,802
Khargpur	50.2	478
Jasapara	291.5	3,593
Surouli	450	5,796
Hayat Nagar	339	3,719
Madhuwan	352.5	1,793
Baruie	191.7	1,280
Domapara	113.7	1,461
Dhandhai	72.3	0
Bhauad Dinpur	316	2,557
Amiliyavisvi	191.6	1,053
Pindoran	162.1	1,155
Mishroli	37.5	1,250
Mahadavpur	79.3	858
Mahmud Purlakhanpur	92	920
Uapdhyaypur	44.8	446
Shobhipur	35.7	144
Khatwar	74.6	546
Bansgaon	63	546
Khandushpur	61	208
Devariya	57.1	391
Pandeypur	28	790
Ayubpur	90	865
Narayanpur	70.9	409
Odouli	50.5	403
Lavdeha	49.4	581
Athaisi	329.9	3,235
Brounsa	480.3	5,160
Rampur	76.2	823
Gangoliya	94.1	176
Gomva	49.4	254
Churavanpur	15.6	457
Mirpur Saroiya	229.4	2,581
Damodarpur	48.3	651
Dhanudih	165.6	1,455
Rahilpara	67.8	615
Bhasupur	85.2	664
Belhari	912.9	6,327
Gopalpur	35.9	1,017
Goragaon	301.9	1,782
Kakwadpur	92.9	637
Arjunpur	70.3	1,284
Kolhuamau	172.5	1,163
Block total	199,942	22,493.5
Village name	Total land area (hectares)	Population (in 2011)
