= Vishwanath Das Shastri =

Indian politician

Member of Parliament, Lok Sabha
- In office 1991–1996
- Preceded by: Ram Singh
- Succeeded by: Devendra Bahadur Roy
- Constituency: Sultanpur, Uttar Pradesh

Personal details
- Born: 9 March 1950 (age 76)
- Party: Bharatiya Janata Party

Vishwanath Das Shastri is an Indian politician. He was elected to the Lok Sabha, the lower house of the Parliament of India from the Sultanpur, Uttar Pradesh as a member of the Bharatiya Janata Party.
