= Khunshekhpur =

- Village
- Location in Uttar Pradesh, India Khunshekhpur (India)
- Coordinates: 26.15°N 82.29°E
- Country: India
- State: Uttar Pradesh
- District: Sultanpur
- Elevation: 90 m (300 ft)

Population (2001)
  - Total: 2,083

Languages
  - Official: Hindi
- Time zone: UTC+5:30 (IST)
- Vehicle registration: UP
- Website: up.gov.in

Khunshekhpur (also known as Paigupur) is a village in Lambhua Mandal, Sultanpur district, Uttar Pradesh. Khunshekhpur sits on the northwestern shore of the Gomti River.

== Demographics ==
Total population of the village is 2083 with 1052 male and 1032 female. Khunshekhpur is located 7.6 km from its Mandal Main Town Lambhua. It is 24 km from its district main city Sultanpur and 155 km from the capital Lucknow. Nearby villages are Bada Gaon (1.5 km), Lotiya (1.9 km), Shakhan Pur (2.7 km), Baruaa Uttari (2.7 km), Madanpur Dewrar (2.9 km). Nearest towns are Kadipur (6.4 km), Lambhua (7.6 km), P.P.Kamaicha (7.8 km), Motigarpur (11.3 km).

Garwa Pur, Gauhani, Ghatampur Utari, Gopalpur Maghaaya, Gopinathpur, Gothawajagipur are the villages along with this village in the same Lambhua Mandal.

== Banking ==
- Bank of Baroda
- Allahabad Bank
- State Bank of India
