= Kadipur Assembly constituency =

Constituency of the Uttar Pradesh legislative assembly in India

Coordinates: 26.17°N 82.37°E

Kadipur
- Constituency No. 191 for the Uttar Pradesh Legislative Assembly

Constituency details
- Country: India
- Region: North India
- State: Uttar Pradesh
- District: Sultanpur
- Total electors: 3,79,507
- Reservation: SC

Member of Legislative Assembly
- 18th Uttar Pradesh Legislative Assembly
- Incumbent Rajesh Gautam
- Party: Bharatiya Janta Party
- Elected year: 2022

Kadipur is a constituency of the Uttar Pradesh Legislative Assembly covering the city of Kadipur in the Sultanpur district of Uttar Pradesh, India.

Kadipur is one of five assembly constituencies in the Sultanpur Lok Sabha constituency. Since 2008, this assembly constituency is numbered 191 amongst 403 constituencies.

== Members of the Legislative Assembly ==
Election	Name	Party
2017	Rajesh Gautam	Bharatiya Janata Party
2022	Rajesh Gautam	Bharatiya Janata Party

== Election results ==
=== 2027 ===
2027 Uttar Pradesh Legislative Assembly election: Kadipur
Party	Candidate	Votes	%	±%
INDIA				
NDA				
BSP				
NOTA	None of the above			
Majority				
Turnout				
gain from		Swing		

=== 2022 ===
2022 Uttar Pradesh Legislative Assembly election: Kadipur
Party	Candidate	Votes	%	±%
BJP	Rajesh Gautam	96,405	43.44	▲1.95
SP	Bhagelu Ram	70,682	31.85	
BSP	Heera Lal	46,388	20.9	▼7.95
INC	Niklesh Saroj	3,248	1.46	▼13.76
NOTA	None of the above	1,635	0.74	▼0.57
Majority		25,723	11.59	▼1.05
Turnout		221,945	58.48	▼0.29
BJP hold		Swing		

=== 2017 ===
2017 Uttar Pradesh Legislative Assembly Election: Kadipur
Party	Candidate	Votes	%	±%
BJP	Rajesh Gautam	87,353	41.49	
BSP	Bhagelu Ram	60,749	28.85	
INC	Angad Kumar	32,042	15.22	
NISHAD	Shitala Prasad	17,266	8.2	
Independent	Hansraj Ravi	3,057	1.45	
NOTA	None of the above	2,718	1.31	
Majority		26,604	12.64	
Turnout		210,538	58.77	

== See also ==
- Sultanpur district
- List of constituencies of the Uttar Pradesh Legislative Assembly
