= Isauli Assembly constituency =

Constituency of the Uttar Pradesh legislative assembly in India

Coordinates: 27.39°N 78.38°E

Isauli
- Constituency No. 187 for the Uttar Pradesh Legislative Assembly

Constituency details
- Country: India
- Region: North India
- State: Uttar Pradesh
- District: Sultanpur
- Total electors: 3,58,604
- Reservation: None

Member of Legislative Assembly
- 18th Uttar Pradesh Legislative Assembly
- Incumbent Mohammad Tahir Khan
- Party: Samajwadi Party
- Elected year: 2022

Isauli is a constituency of the Uttar Pradesh Legislative Assembly covering the city of Isauli in the Sultanpur district of Uttar Pradesh, India.

Isauli is one of five assembly constituencies in the Sultanpur Lok Sabha constituency.

== Members of the Legislative Assembly ==
Year	Member	Party
2012	Abrar Ahmed	Samajwadi Party
2017	Abrar Ahmed	Samajwadi Party
2022	Mohammad Tahir Khan	Samajwadi Party

== Election results ==
=== 2027 ===
2027 Uttar Pradesh Legislative Assembly election: Isauli
Party	Candidate	Votes	%	±%
INDIA				
NDA				
BSP				
NOTA	None of the above			
Majority				
Turnout				
gain from		Swing		

=== 2022 ===
2022 Uttar Pradesh Legislative Assembly election: Isauli
Party	Candidate	Votes	%	±%
SP	Mohammad Tahir Khan	69,629	34.34	▲7.4
BJP	Om Prakash Pandey	69,360	34.21	▲9.49
BSP	Yash Bhadra Singh	54,119	26.69	▲13.66
AIMIM	Mazhar Hussain	3,308	1.63	▼0.39
INC	Brijmohan Yadav	2,306	1.14	
NOTA	None of the above	1,626	0.8	▼0.39
Majority		269	0.13	▼2.09
Turnout		202,743	56.54	▲0.19
SP hold		Swing		

=== 2017 ===
2017 Uttar Pradesh Legislative Assembly election: Isauli
Party	Candidate	Votes	%	±%
SP	Abrar Ahmed	51,583	26.94	
BJP	Om Prakash Pandey	47,342	24.72	
RLD	Yash Bhadra Singh	43,026	22.47	
BSP	Dr. Shailendra Tripathi	24,961	13.03	
Most Backward Classes Of India	Shiv Kumar Singh	11,445	5.98	
AIMIM	Haji Mohd. Daud Khan	3,865	2.02	
Independent	Shahabuddin	1,809	0.94	
NOTA	None of the above	2,256	1.19	
Majority		4,241	2.22	
Turnout		191,509	56.35	
SP gain from BJP		Swing		
