= Kurwar =

Kurwar Kudwar
- Village
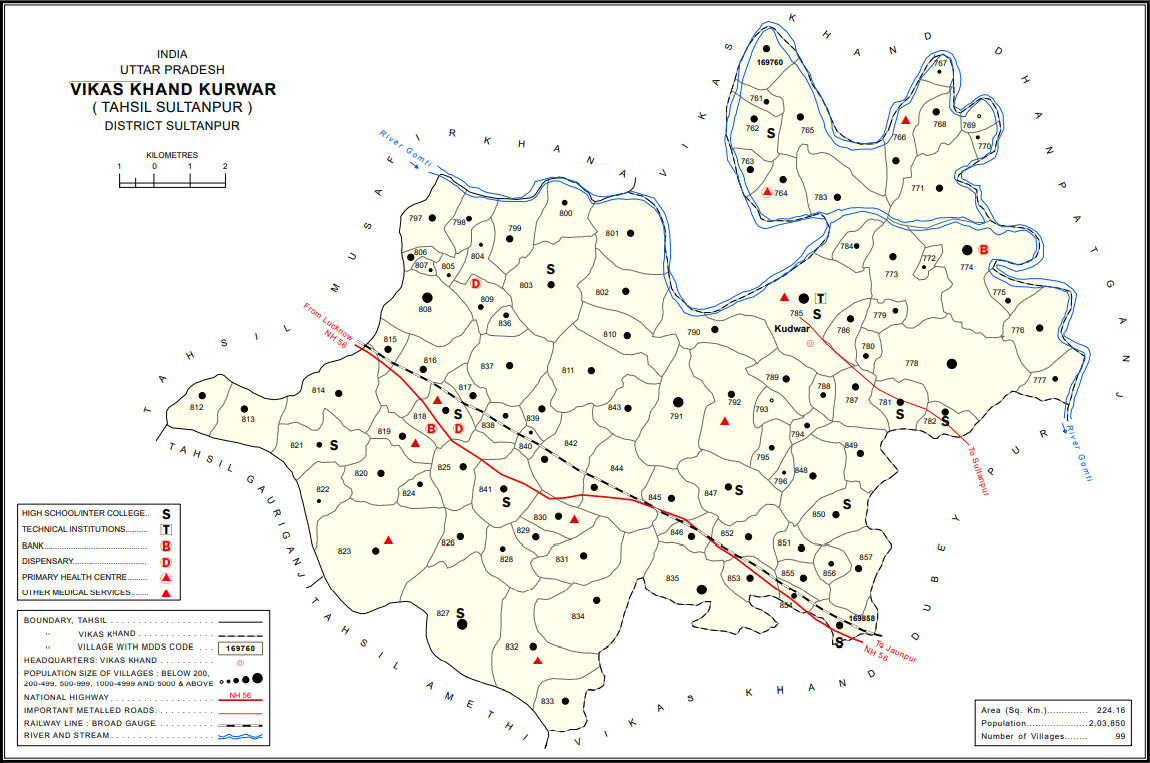
- Map showing Kurwar (#785) in Kurwar CD block

- Location in Uttar Pradesh, India
- Coordinates: 26.347496°N 81.97874°E
- Country: India
- State: Uttar Pradesh
- Division: Ayodhya division
- District: Sultanpur

Area
  - Total: 6.718 km^{2} (2.594 sq mi)

Population (2011)
  - Total: 10,826
  - Density: 1,611/km^{2} (4,174/sq mi)

Languages
  - Official: Hindi, Urdu
- Time zone: UTC+5:30 (IST)

Kurwar is a town and community development block headquarters in Sultanpur district, Uttar Pradesh, India. It is located by the Gomti River, 14 km northwest of Sultanpur on the road to Isauli and Haliapur. The southern part of the village is on fairly high ground, but the area north of the main road is low-lying and prone to flooding. Kurwar historically was the seat of the taluqdari estate of the Raja of Kurwar, who was the head of the Bachgoti Rajput clan.

As of 2011, Kurwar has a population of 10,826, in 1,785 households. It has 4 primary schools and a community health centre. Kurwar hosts a market twice per week, on Mondays and Fridays; it mostly deals in cloth, pottery and bullocks. It also hosts a large Dussehra festival involving dramatic reenactments of scenes from the Ramayana. Vendors bring items such as earthenware pottery, hosiery, hemp ropes, cloth, toys, and sweets to sell at the fair. Kurwar is also the seat of a nyaya panchayat which also includes 13 other villages.

== History ==
Kurwar was historically the seat of the Raja of Kurwar, who was head of the Bachgoti Rajput clan and who lived in a palace here. The palace was built by the Court of Wards, and Raja Partab Bahadur Singh also built a large zanana house which was completed in 1902.

The Rajas of Kurwar claimed descent from one Prithipat Singh; the ninth raja, Niwaz Singh, had two sons named Lachhman Singh (who inherited Kurwar) and Man Singh (who received the taluqa of Bhiti; Lachhman Singh's grandsons all died without issue, and Sukhdev Singh, a descendant of Man Singh, seized Kurwar, and his descendants would subsequently reign as rajas. At the turn of the 20th century, the Kurwar estate consisted of 64 villages and 9 pattis in the parganas of Miranpur and Baraunsa, and the raja also held the Hathgaon estate of 37 villages and 15 pattis in Faizabad district.

At the turn of the 20th century, Kurwar was described as a large village with "a very flourishing upper primary school, one of the best in the district," as well as a female dispensary maintained by the Raja of Kurwar. It was not, however a trade centre. The population as of 1901 was 3,004 people, including 2,297 Hindus and 707 Muslims. The main caste groups were Brahmins, Thakurs, and Kayasths.

The 1951 census recorded Kurwar as comprising 36 hamlets, with a total population of 3,640 people (1,808 male and 1,832 female), in 852 households and 780 physical houses. The area of the village was given as 1,722 acres. The village was listed as belonging to the pargana of Miranpur and the thana of Kotwali. The village had a district board-run primary school with 276 students in attendance as of 1 January 1951.

The 1961 census recorded Kurwar as comprising 37 hamlets, with a total population of 4,112 people (2,047 male and 2,065 female), in 795 households and 760 physical houses. The area of the village was given as 1,722 acres and it had a medical practitioner, maternity and child welfare centre, and government-run dispensary with 2 male and 2 female beds. Average attendance of the twice-weekly haat was about 1,500 people, while attendance of the Dussehra fair was about 2,000.

The 1981 census recorded Kurwar as having a population of 5,876 people, in 1,031 households, and having an area of 696.89 hectares. The main staple foods were listed as wheat and rice.

The 1991 census recorded Kurwar (as "Kudwar") as having a total population of 7,428 people (3,826 male and 3,602 female), in 1,181 households and 1,156 physical houses. The area of the village was listed as 996.89 hectares. Members of the 0-6 age group numbered 1,426, or 19% of the total; this group was 53% male (757) and 47% female (669). Members of scheduled castes numbered 758, or 10% of the village's total population, while no members of scheduled tribes were recorded. The literacy rate of the village was 52% (2,152 men and 984 women, counting only people age 7 and up). 1,970 people were classified as main workers (1,736 men and 234 women), while 10 people were classified as marginal workers (all women); the remaining 5,448 residents were non-workers. The breakdown of main workers by employment category was as follows: 635 cultivators (i.e. people who owned or leased their own land); 530 agricultural labourers (i.e. people who worked someone else's land in return for payment); 0 workers in livestock, forestry, fishing, hunting, plantations, orchards, etc.; 0 in mining and quarrying; 188 household industry workers; 70 workers employed in other manufacturing, processing, service, and repair roles; 4 construction workers; 245 employed in trade and commerce; 23 employed in transport, storage, and communications; and 285 in other services.

== Villages ==
Kurwar CD block has the following 99 villages:

Village name	Total land area (hectares)	Population (in 2011)
Basantpur Tivaripur	135.5	1,489
Khajapur	77.6	645
Marha	176.8	1,027
Madhopur Acharya	77.8	1,426
Bahubara	209.8	1,885
Agai	421.9	3,371
Mudva	321.5	2,948
Avadha	88	285
Sarav	128.6	1,195
Soti	49	34
Madhopur	82.3	375
Nougbatir	491.3	2,821
Uapadh Yaypur	38.9	359
Pratappur	341.7	2,148
Bhandar Parasrampur	1,318.5	5,656
Tirachha	25.8	700
Nirsahiya	229.8	1,505
Kumhai	171.9	905
Sohgouli	645.1	6,339
Bhagvanpur	50.4	818
Utmanpur	61.6	551
Gajahati	154.7	3,905
Bhdahara	136.4	1,422
Khadar Basantpur	283.6	1,454
Nayora	92.2	859
Kurwar (block headquarters)	671.8	10,826
Isauli	98.5	1,349
Devalpur	191.7	1,631
Chitaipur	51.9	845
Harkhpur	157.7	2,310
Grantkurvar	328	1,101
Dhanrava	389	7,354
Sarkoura	464.9	4,849
Kapurpur	70	65
Jagdishpur	59	719
Pataipur	115.6	826
Mahmudpur Bangir	29	387
Pipri	227.3	1,478
Purejrekhi	152.8	584
Mithnepur	171.1	2,011
Pahrauli	199.2	810
Kota	431.6	2,143
Vinaykpur	272.7	1,492
Balapashchim	473.2	3,807
Pureudayram	78.1	346
Narottampur	49.6	403
Maviya	77.9	1,249
Chak Mavaiya	14.6	229
Kotiya	348.1	5,861
Purepavar	110.2	896
Rajapur	205.1	2,521
Domanpur	358.6	4,814
Rampur Matha	155.4	1,228
Dhusyariya	225.8	1,530
Uchgaon	424.3	4,036
Khadsa	55.3	1,242
Sarayapurevishan	312.9	3,651
Masetva	55.2	1,042
Maniyari	191.4	2,931
Tikariya	259.9	1,270
Baburi	269.8	2,461
Ajiyavardabi	212	917
Sanibhar	179.1	253
Majhna	728.8	3,352
Senduri	68.3	917
Daudpatti	251.7	3,672
Devalpur	151.5	1,023
Hajipatti	654.2	5,777
Karamchandpur	163.9	881
Bukunpur	83.7	1,337
Rampur	136.5	1,359
Dharupur	230.2	1,552
Bhati	475.2	3,729
Shanichara	201.6	1,158
Narahi	461.9	3,021
Shahpur Sarkande Dih	597.9	5,990
Pureladaie	78.5	893
Bahmarpur	296.4	2,438
Uttar Gaaon	129	848
Harkhi Purbiripur	111.1	1,017
Badauliya	33.5	401
Khokhipur	295.5	3,042
Khaniya Pashchim	311.8	2,225
Bahlolour	192.3	2,253
Khaniyapurva	388.4	3,382
Surjipur	170.3	1,619
Asaroga	97.2	1,248
Naaugva	289.1	2,888
Miranpur	176.6	2,277
Parsipur	139.1	1,662
Ajhuie	500.7	4,265
Kotva	89.3	1,288
Rankedih	236.7	3,462
Mudainavada	135.1	1,442
Bramhjitpur	60.7	979
Pratap Pur	73.6	1,173
Mahamud Pur	73	515
Maniyar Pur	248.6	3,593
Judupur	135.1	2,213
Block total	203,850	22,516
Village name	Total land area (hectares)	Population (in 2011)

== Schools ==
1. Aadarsh primary school Pragya Academy Nursery School
2. RDL Public School
3. BP Inter College
4. Bhuvneshwari Pratap Sanskrit Maha Vidyalaya
5. Dr. Mahadevi Verma Inter College
6. Kastoorba Gandhi Balika vidyalaya
7. Hermitage Public School
8. Yash Bharti siksha Niketan
