= Santosh Pandey =

Santosh Pandey may refer to:

- Santosh Pandey (Uttar Pradesh politician)
- Santosh Pandey (Chhattisgarh politician)
