= Sadar Assembly constituency =

Constituency of the Uttar Pradesh legislative assembly in India

Coordinates: 26.08°N 82.27°E

Sultanpur Sadar
- Constituency No. 189 for the Uttar Pradesh Legislative Assembly

Constituency details
- Country: India
- Region: North India
- State: Uttar Pradesh
- District: Sultanpur
- Reservation: None

Member of Legislative Assembly
- 18th Uttar Pradesh Legislative Assembly
- Incumbent Raj Prasad Upadhyay
- Party: Bharatiya Janta Party
- Elected year: 2022
- Preceded by: Sitaram Verma

Sultanpur Sadar is a constituency of the Uttar Pradesh Legislative Assembly covering the city of Sultanpur in the Sultanpur district of Uttar Pradesh, India.

Sultanpur Sadar is one of five assembly constituencies in the Sultanpur Lok Sabha constituency. Since 2008, this assembly constituency is numbered 189 among 403 constituencies.

== Members of the Legislative Assembly ==
Election	Name	Party
2012	Arun Kumar	Samajwadi Party
2017	Sitaram Verma	Bharatiya Janata Party
2022	Raj Prasad Upadhyay	Bharatiya Janata Party

== Election results ==
=== 2027 ===
2027 Uttar Pradesh Legislative Assembly election: Sadar
Party	Candidate	Votes	%	±%
INDIA				
NDA				
BSP	Madhu lata Verma			
NOTA	None of the above			
Majority				
Turnout				
gain from		Swing		

=== 2022 ===
2022 Uttar Pradesh Legislative Assembly election: Sadar
Party	Candidate	Votes	%	±%
BJP	Raj Prasad Upadhyay	85,249	41.89	▲5.46
SP	Arun Verma	69,495	34.15	▲7.89
BSP	Om Prakash Singh	39,920	19.62	▼6.89
INC	Abhishek Singh Rana	4,133	2.03	
NOTA	None of the above	1,439	0.71	▼0.32
Majority		15,754	7.74	▼2.18
Turnout		203,496	59.1	▲0.73
BJP hold		Swing		

2017 Uttar Pradesh Legislative Assembly Election: Sadar
Party	Candidate	Votes	%	±%
BJP	Sitaram Verma	68,950	36.43	
BSP	Raj Prasad Upadhyay	50,177	26.51	
SP	Arun Verma	49,692	26.26	
NISHAD	Sanatya Kumar	10,994	5.81	
NOTA	None of the above	1,935	1.03	
Majority		18,773	9.92	
Turnout		189,249	58.37	
BJP gain from SP		Swing		

=== 2012 ===
2012 Uttar Pradesh Legislative Assembly election: Sadar
Party	Candidate	Votes	%	±%
SP	Arun Verma	71,939	42.97	12.49
BSP	Raj Prasad Upadhyay	51,032	30.48	−5.52
BJP	Arjun Singh	24,389	14.57	−0.43
INC	Jai Narayan	7,174	4.29	−8.21
Majority		20,907	12.49	
Turnout		167,420	59.64	
SP gain from BSP		Swing		

== See also ==
- Sultanpur district
- List of constituencies of the Uttar Pradesh Legislative Assembly
