= Masirpur =

Masirpur Masīrpur
- Village
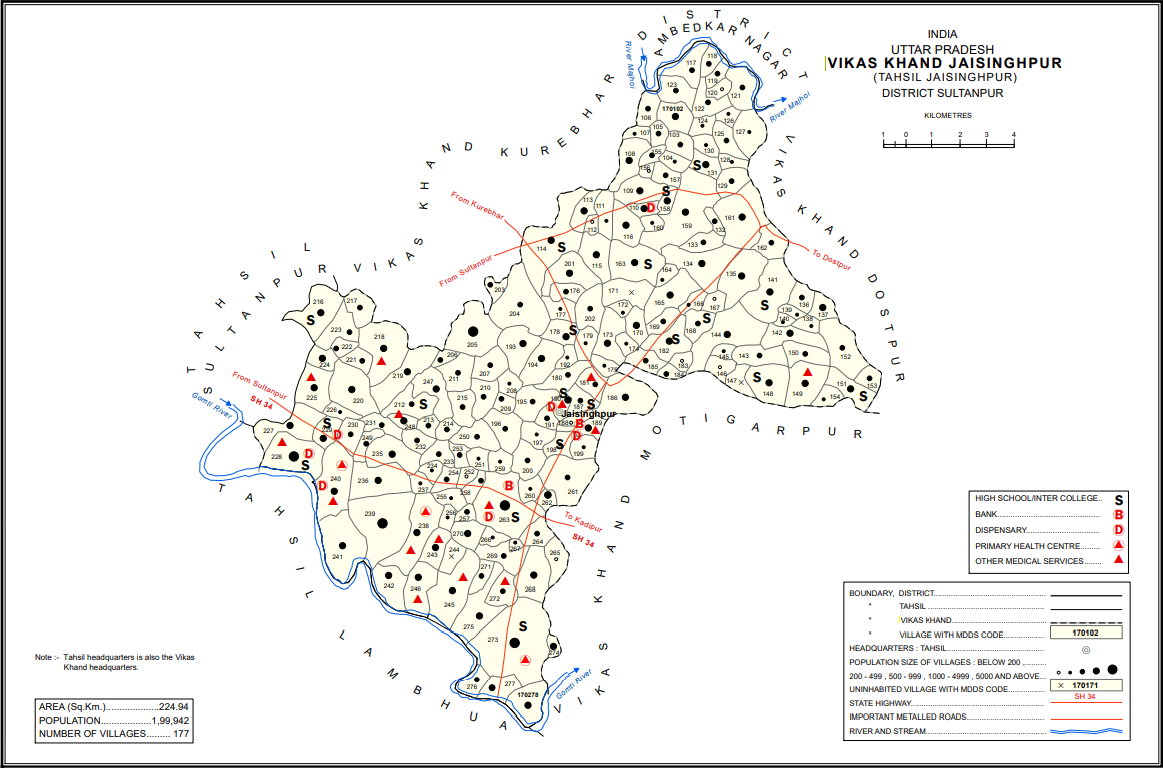
- Map showing Masirpur (#195) in Jaisinghpur CD block

- Location in Uttar Pradesh, India
- Coordinates: 26.284811°N 82.233918°E
- Country: India
- State: Uttar Pradesh
- Division: Faizabad division
- District: Sultanpur

Area
  - Total: 1.411 km^{2} (0.545 sq mi)

Population (2011)
  - Total: 967
  - Density: 685/km^{2} (1,770/sq mi)

Languages
  - Official: Hindi, Urdu
- Time zone: UTC+5:30 (IST)

Masirpur is a village in Jaisinghpur block of Sultanpur district, Uttar Pradesh, India. As of 2011, it has a population of 967 people, in 163 households. It has no schools and no healthcare facilities. It belongs to the nyaya panchayat of Jaisinghpur.

The 1951 census recorded Masirpur as comprising 3 hamlets, with a total population of 349 people (185 male and 164 female), in 72 households and 69 physical houses. The area of the village was given as 346 acres. 41 residents were literate, 38 male and 3 female. The village was listed as belonging to the pargana of Baraunsa and the thana of Jaisinghpur.

The 1961 census recorded Masirpur as comprising 3 hamlets, with a total population of 388 people (197 male and 191 female), in 77 households and 75 physical houses. The area of the village was given as 347 acres.

The 1981 census recorded Masirpur as having a population of 484 people, in 89 households, and having an area of 138.81 hectares. The main staple foods were listed as wheat and rice.

The 1991 census recorded Masirpur as having a total population of 698 people (353 male and 345 female), in 123 households and 120 physical houses. The area of the village was listed as 138.81 hectares. Members of the 0-6 age group numbered 121, or 17% of the total; this group was 48% male (58) and 52% female (63). Members of scheduled castes numbered 120, or 17% of the village's total population, while no members of scheduled tribes were recorded. The literacy rate of the village was 53% (199 men and 109 women, counting only people age 7 and up). 211 people were classified as main workers (180 men and 31 women), while 13 people were classified as marginal workers (all women); the remaining 474 residents were non-workers. The breakdown of main workers by employment category was as follows: 166 cultivators (i.e. people who owned or leased their own land); 22 agricultural labourers (i.e. people who worked someone else's land in return for payment); 0 workers in livestock, forestry, fishing, hunting, plantations, orchards, etc.; 0 in mining and quarrying; 0 household industry workers; 2 workers employed in other manufacturing, processing, service, and repair roles; 0 construction workers; 5 employed in trade and commerce; 1 employed in transport, storage, and communications; and 15 in other services.
