= Daulatpur, Jaisinghpur, Sultanpur =

Daulatpur
- Village
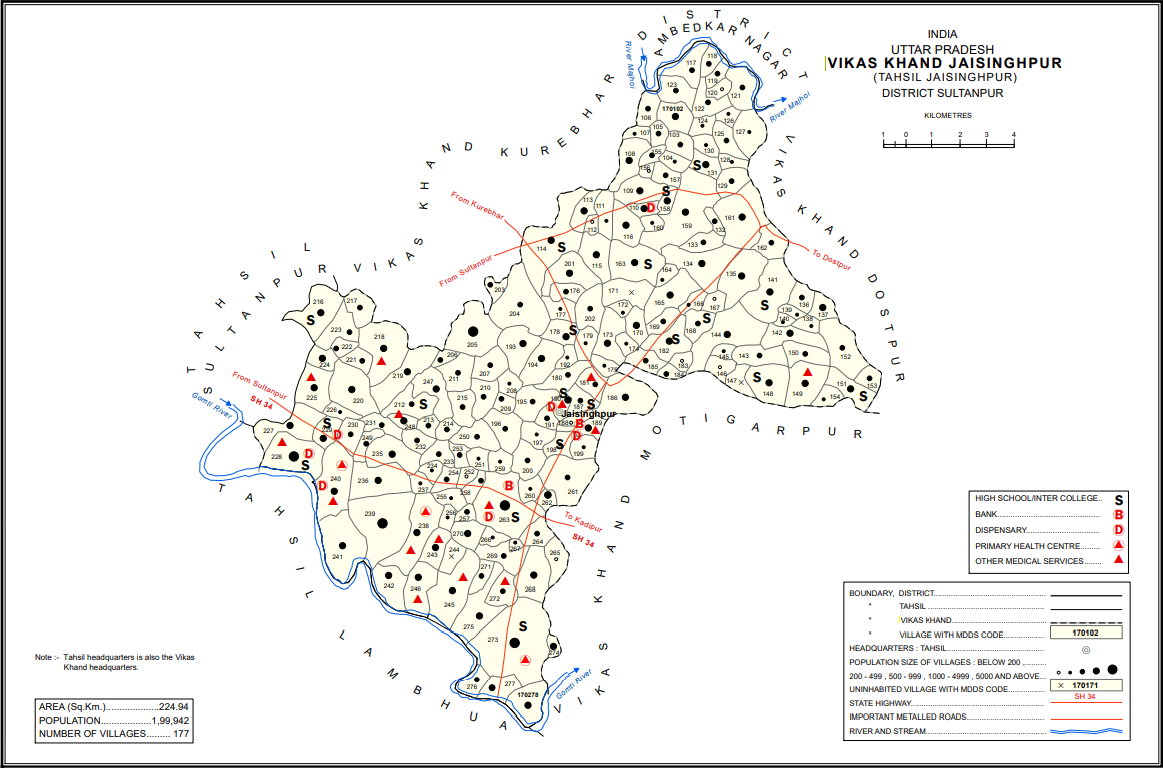
- Map showing Daulatpur (#215) in Jaisinghpur CD block

- Location in Uttar Pradesh, India
- Coordinates: 26.283078°N 82.205041°E
- Country: India
- State: Uttar Pradesh
- Division: Faizabad division
- District: Sultanpur

Area
  - Total: 1.265 km^{2} (0.488 sq mi)

Population (2011)
  - Total: 974
  - Density: 770/km^{2} (1,990/sq mi)

Languages
  - Official: Hindi, Urdu
- Time zone: UTC+5:30 (IST)

Daulatpur is a village in Jaisinghpur block of Sultanpur district, Uttar Pradesh, India. As of 2011, it has a population of 974 people, in 169 households. It has one primary school and no healthcare facilities and it does not host a permanent market or weekly haat. It belongs to the nyaya panchayat of Saraiya.

The 1951 census recorded Daulatpur as comprising 3 hamlets, with a total population of 372 people (183 male and 189 female), in 77 households and 72 physical houses. The area of the village was given as 318 acres. 13 residents were literate, all male. The village was listed as belonging to the pargana of Baraunsa and the thana of Jaisinghpur.

The 1961 census recorded Daulatpur as comprising 3 hamlets, with a total population of 444 people (215 male and 229 female), in 74 physical houses. The area of the village was given as 318 acres.

The 1981 census recorded Daulatpur as having a population of 601 people, in 109 households, and having an area of 127.89 hectares. The main staple foods were listed as wheat and rice.

The 1991 census recorded Daulatpur as having a total population of 676 people (327 male and 349 female), in 109 households and 107 physical houses. The area of the village was listed as 127.89 hectares. Members of the 0-6 age group numbered 130, or 19% of the total; this group was 50% male (65) and 50% female (65). Members of scheduled castes numbered 77, or 11% of the village's total population, while no members of scheduled tribes were recorded. The literacy rate of the village was 40% (169 men and 48 women, counting only people age 7 and up). 172 people were classified as main workers (161 men and 11 women), while 62 people were classified as marginal workers (5 men and 57 women); the remaining 442 residents were non-workers. The breakdown of main workers by employment category was as follows: 96 cultivators (i.e. people who owned or leased their own land); 37 agricultural labourers (i.e. people who worked someone else's land in return for payment); 2 workers in livestock, forestry, fishing, hunting, plantations, orchards, etc.; 0 in mining and quarrying; 6 household industry workers; 7 workers employed in other manufacturing, processing, service, and repair roles; 1 construction worker; 4 employed in trade and commerce; 1 employed in transport, storage, and communications; and 18 in other services.
