= Kurebhar =

- Town
- Location in Uttar Pradesh, India
- Country: India
- State: Uttar Pradesh
- Division: Ayodhya division
- District: Sultanpur
- Block: Kurebhar

Language
  - Official language: Hindi
  - Regional language: Awadhi
- Time zone: UTC+5:30 (IST)
- PIN: 228151
- Vehicle registration: UP - 44

Kurebhar is a town in Sultanpur district of the Uttar Pradesh state in India. Kurebhar is 18 km north of district headquarters Sultanpur city.

== Governance ==
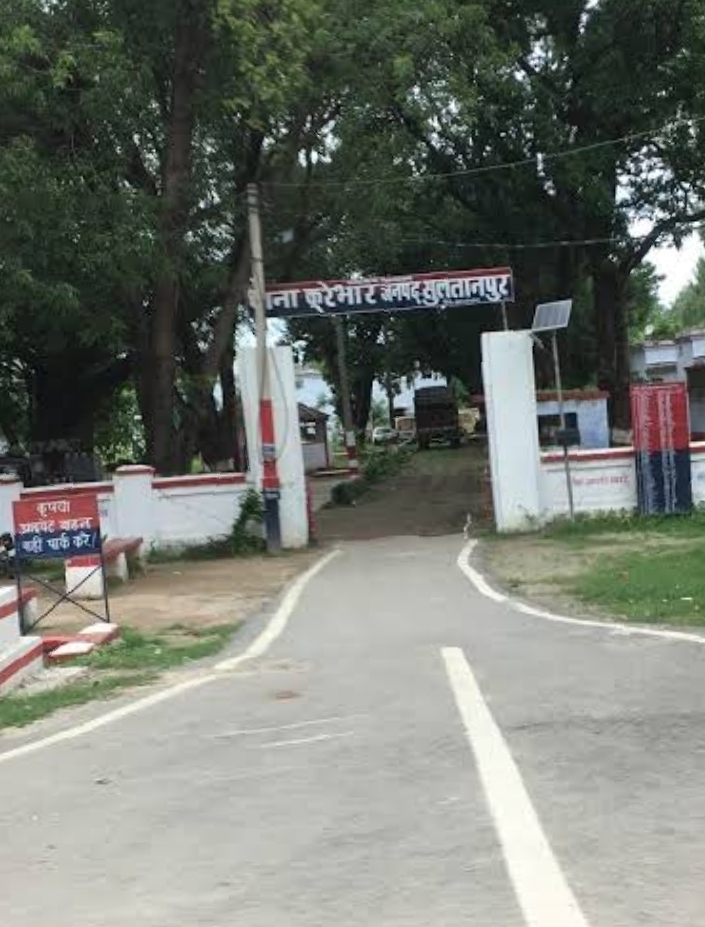
Police station Kurebhar, Sultanpur

There is a police station in Kurebhar. Kurebhar is also a Block in Sultanpur district. Pin Code of Kurebhar is 228151.

== Transport ==
=== By Road ===
Kurebhar is situated on NH-330 Ayodhya- Sultanpur road in Sultanpur, Uttar Pradesh. That's why it is well connected with nearby cities and towns. Sultanpur, Ayodhya, Pratapgarh and Prayagraj are nearby cities. And Haiderganj, Dhanpatganj, Chaure Bazar, Guptarganj, Semari, Bikapur and Haliyapur towns are also well connected with Kurebhar. Now Purvanchal Expressway make easier journey of lucknow and azamgarh

=== By Train ===
There is a Kurebhar railway station in the town itself. Sultanpur junction, Ayodhya Cantt, Ayodhya Junction are the nearby railway stations from Kurebhar.

=== By Air ===
Ayodhya Airport and Chaudhary Charan Singh International Airport are the nearby airports to reach Kurebhar.
