= Abrar Ahmed (disambiguation) =

Abrar Ahmed (born 1998) is a Pakistani cricketer.

Abrar Ahmed can also refer to:

- Abrar Ahmed (Indian cricketer) (born 1971), Indian cricketer
- Abrar Ahmed (INC politician) (1956–2004), Indian politician
- Abrar Ahmed (Samajwadi politician) (born 1950), Indian politician
