= KNIT =

KNIT may refer to:

- Kamla Nehru Institute of Technology (KNIT), an institute in India
- KNIT (AM), a radio station (1320 AM) licensed to serve Salt Lake City, Utah, United States
- KKHI (FM), a radio station (102.3 FM) licensed to serve Kaunakakai, Hawaii, United States, which held the call sign KNIT from 2015 to 2016
- KMKK-FM, a defunct radio station (105.5 FM) formerly licensed to serve Tecopa, California, United States, which held the call sign KNIT from 2014 to 2015
- KTTE, a defunct radio station (90.1 FM) formerly licensed to serve Humboldt, Nebraska, United States, which held the call sign KNIT from 2012 to 2014
- KNGO, a radio station (1480 AM) licensed to serve Dallas, Texas, United States, which held the call sign KNIT from 2005 to 2012
