= Raj Karan Singh =

Indian politician (1936–2023)

Member of Parliament, Lok Sabha
- In office 1984–1989
- Preceded by: Giriraj Singh
- Succeeded by: Ram Singh
- Constituency: Sultanpur, Uttar Pradesh

Personal details
- Born: 1 April 1936 Nevada, Amethi District, United Provinces, British India
- Died: 25 June 2023 (aged 87) Nevada, Amethi District, Uttar Pradesh, India
- Party: Indian National Congress
- Spouse: Shayam Pati

Raj Karan Singh (1 April 1936 – 25 June 2023) was an Indian politician. He was elected to the Lok Sabha, the lower house of the Parliament of India from the Sultanpur, Uttar Pradesh as a member of the Indian National Congress.

Singh died in Nevada, Amethi District on 25 June 2023, at the age of 87.
