= Dhurrie =

Cotton flatweave carpet

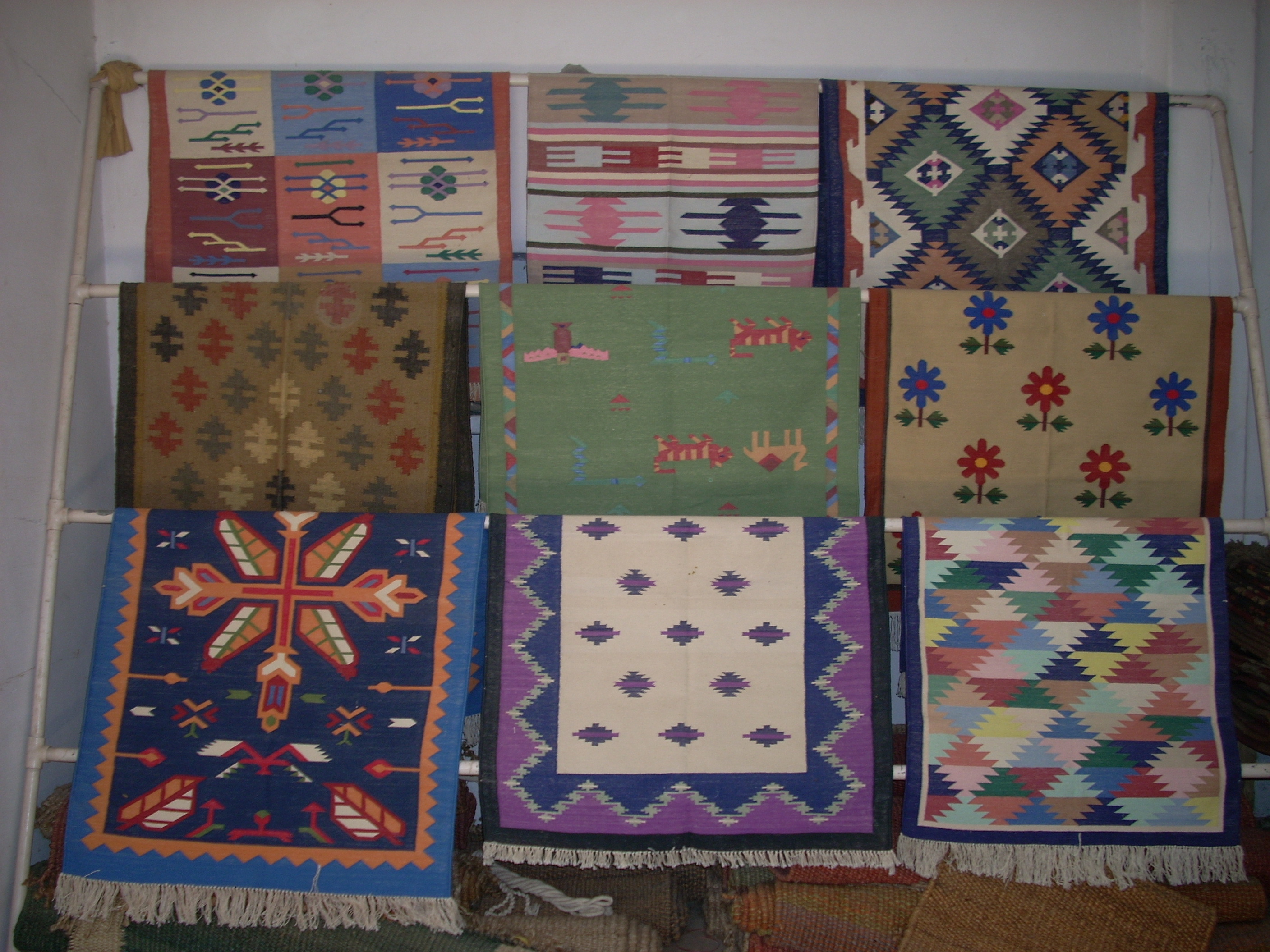
Dhurries of Rajasthan

A dhurrie (also dhurri, durrie, durry or dari) is a handwoven rug or a thin flat carpet, an item of home furnishing from the Indian subcontinent. The dhurries have unique designs inspired by the state of origin such as multicolor stripes, one of the most popular patterns. Dhurrie weaving was a big industry in rural India, and they are woven across the country. Dhurries are used traditionally as floor-coverings or bedding.

== Uses ==
They have a variety of use depending on size, pattern and material. The smallest one is 12 by 12 inches (30 by 30 cm) and is used as a table cover for telephone stands and flower vases. They are also made in sizes that are ideal for doing meditation such as 24 by 24 inches (61 by 61 cm), known as an aasan.

Dhurries used in large political or social gatherings may be as large as 20 by 20 feet (6 by 6 m). Dhurries are easily portable being light weight and foldable. They come in variety of color combinations and patterns catering to the needs of any taste or occasion.

Dhurries have a low maintenance cost as they do not get infected by silverfish or other insects responsible for destroying carpets.

Dhurries can be used year round. The cotton dhurrie is warm in winters and cool in summers.

== Material ==
Dhurries are made from four types of materials: cotton, wool, jute, and silk, as well as in various of combinations of these. This material is first converted into thread and then woven into dhurries.

== Manufacturing ==
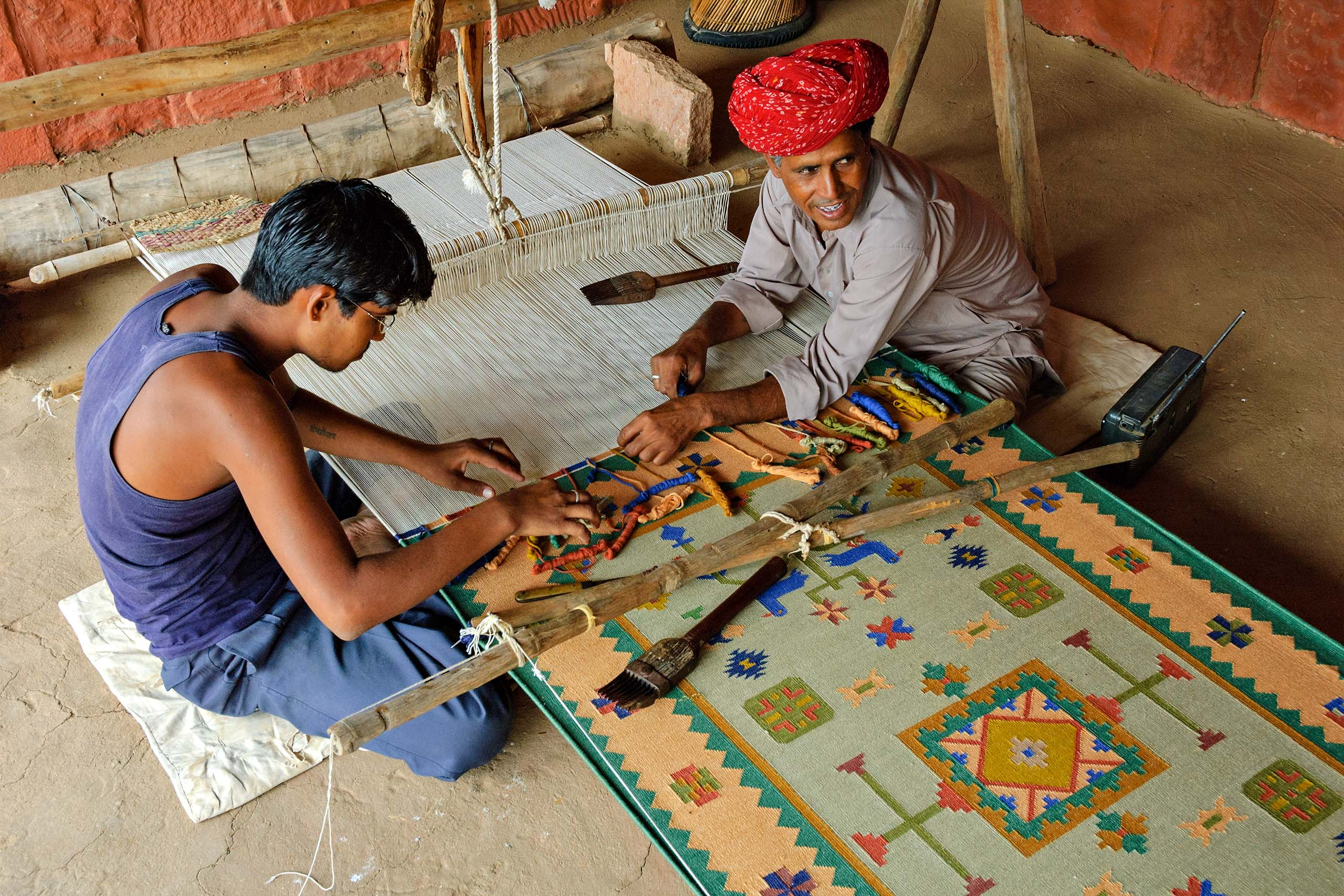
Dhurrie weavers making traditional carpets at a Durry Udhyog, Bishnoi village, India

Pukhraj Durry Udhyog In Rajasthan pit looms are also used for weaving in which weaver sits in a pit and the feet are used in weaving. The maximum breadth is 24 inches.

Haryana is famous for its dhurries, especially the Punja Dhurries. Dhurries are present in almost all villages and are considered a leisure time activity by women. They are colourful and are used as bedsheets or floor coverings. Haryana's dhurries are one of the most famous textiles in India.

Madhya Pradesh dhurries are known for their colours and sturdy character. Rajasthan, Uttar Pradesh, Punjab and Himachal Pradesh, make distinctive type of dhurries. In some part of these states the dhurries make a part of dowry given at the time of a daughter's marriage.

Several important centres of dhurrie-making in pre-Independence Punjab are now in Pakistan; however, in present-day Punjab, the areas around Ludhiana, Faridkot and Bhatinda are fairly prolific and well-known. Shah-nashin, a type of Dhurrie with checkerboard pattern in the center was also a product of the Punjab region.

Dhurries made in Rajasthan at Salawas are known as Panja dhurries and are exported on large scale. Khairabad in Uttar Pradesh is a major dhurrie-making centre. Citapore rugs (Sitapur dhurries) made here are based on flat weave technique using horizontal looms. Besides cotton, jute, rayon and chenille dhurries are also made here and exported all over the world. IKEA and Agocha have been sourcing dhurries for their stores from this area.

Dhurries are also made in Navalgund taluk of Karnataka state in India. It has its own geographical tag for dhurrie, Navalgund durries known as jamkhana in local Kannada language. The craft is declining rapidly and the weavers are leaving the job to sustain their lives and earn better as it is a small business and cheap to sell while it requires much effort to manufacture as it is hand-woven. Automation is too costly and faulty as it cannot be used without messing the design and patterns of the dhurrie.

== See also ==
- Khes – Simple loose clothing item to wrap around in the Punjab region
- Kilim – Flat tapestry-woven carpet
- Tat patti – Indigenous floor cover made of Jute
