= Khes =

Simple loose clothing item to wrap around in the Punjab region

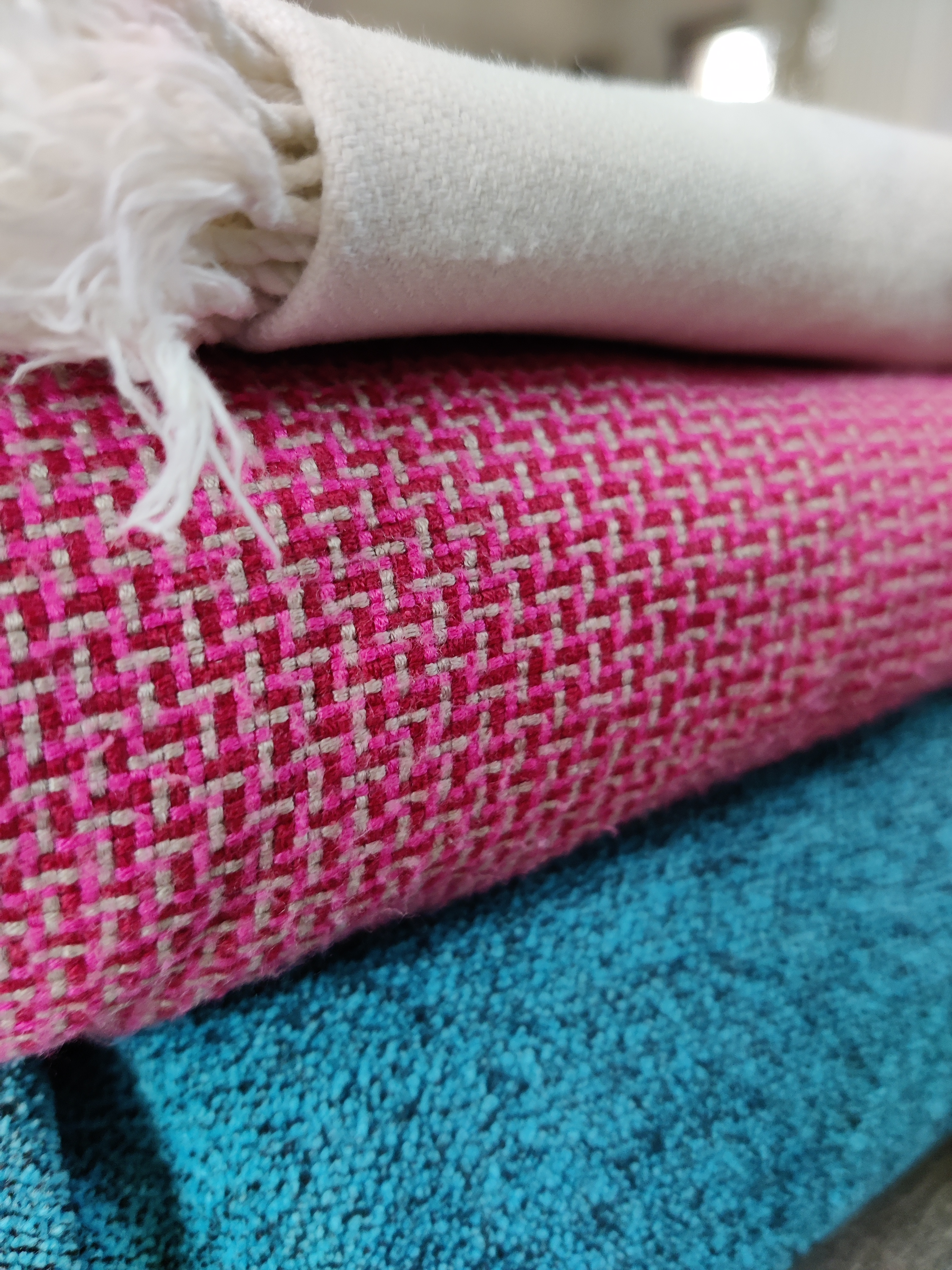
Khes (a kind of thick blanket, it is a handoom damask cloth) used in bedding in Pakistan and northwest India.

Khes (Punjabi pronunciation: [kʰeːsː]) is a thick cotton blanket cloth in northern Indian subcontinent; it is a damask cloth used for blankets and winter wraps. Khes is generally hand-woven with coarse cotton yarns. Khes as a garment is a simple clothing item to wear loosely to cover the upper body by men in Pakistan and northwest India. Khes is an important cloth in the Punjab region, as well as Sindh Haryana, and western Uttar Pradesh, which are famous for its production and historically has been known for not only the production of Khes but also many other coarse cotton textiles, especially in the 19th and 20th centuries. Khes is a comfort object used in bedding, and is also usable as a cover.

== Khes weaving ==
=== Weave ===
Khes is a thick woven cloth made on a handloom. Khes weaving was a traditional textile art associated with rural Punjab. The craft of khes-weaving had cultural significance in rural areas. Women in villages used to weave khes. Women in the villages of Punjab have been weaving khes as part of their wedding trousseau for years.

Spans of khes were traditionally woven in pairs and then stitched together. Khes pieces from the town of Rampur, Uttar Pradesh, were larger and available in sizes of up to 6 by 9 feet (2.75 by 1.8 m).

Khesi is a wider variant of khes, for use in making sheets.

=== Patterns ===
Most khes were made of cotton, but there were also some varieties of cotton and silk. Khes varieties were distinguished by different weave patterns and origins. Primarily, Khes were plain or with geometrical designs, including check pattern (charkhana, chequered) and diamond patterns. The frequency of the checkered style has led to khes sometimes being referred to as a type of tartan cloth (a term more often reserved for Scottish textiles). Dabba khes is a pattern with squares formed using dyed yarns. Khes from Rampur State was famous for its superior-quality cotton and unique, interwoven patterns, often with gold thread and borders in various coloured yarns. Khes patpatti had white and red check patterns, while khes tukridaar was the name for white and blue checks. Khesbaf weaving was the term for forming diagonal patterns.

== Production ==
=== India ===
Production in India takes place in the Malwa, a region in southern Indian Punjab. Other places in India include Panipat, Haryana and Rampur, Uttar Pradesh.

=== Pakistan ===
Production in Punjab takes place in districts of Bahawalpur, Faisalabad, Multan, Okara, Sargodha and in the villages of the Cholistan) and Sindh (in the city of Naserpur, Sehwan Sharif, and Thatta)

== See also ==
- Punjabi clothing
- Dhurrie
