= Shukul Bazar =

Shukul Bazar Bāzār Shukul
- Town
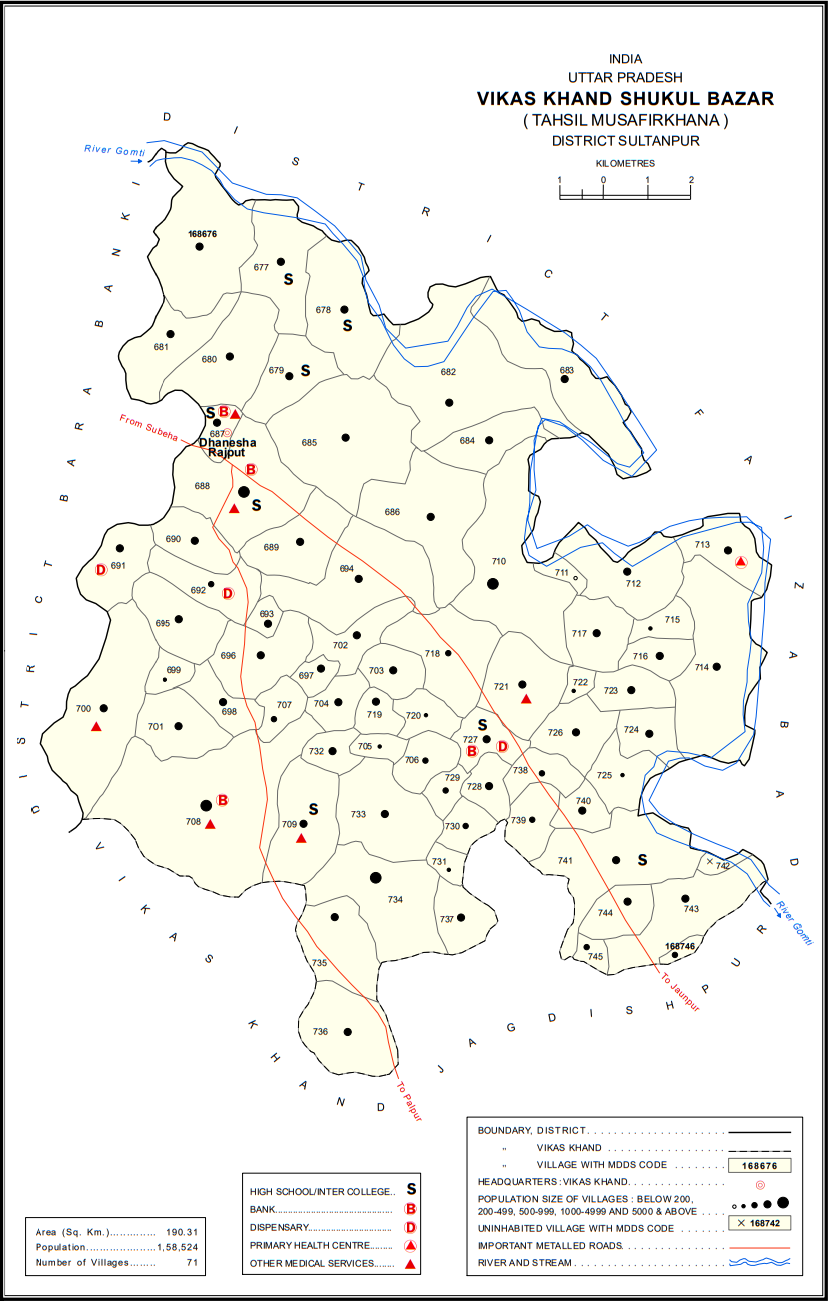
- Map showing Shukul Bazar CD block

- Location in Uttar Pradesh, India
- Coordinates: 26.602751°N 81.582598°E
- Country: India
- State: Uttar Pradesh
- Division: Faizabad division
- District: Sultanpur

Languages
  - Official: Hindi, Urdu
- Time zone: UTC+5:30 (IST)

Shukul Bazar, also called Bazar Shukul or more rarely Mawaiya-Rahmatgarh, is a town and community development block in Musafirkhana tehsil of Sultanpur district, Uttar Pradesh, India. It is located on the road from Inhauna to Rudauli.

At the turn of the 20th century, Shukul Bazar was described as the only real town in the otherwise mostly rural tehsil of Musafirkhana. It had an important market and was the headquarters of a police thana which, despite its small jurisdiction, was very busy due to a lot of unrest in the area. It also had a post office and one of the largest schools in the tehsil.

The market at Shukul Bazar is held on Wednesdays and Sundays and mostly deals in cloth. As of 1961, it had an average attendance of around 500 people. At that point, the town also had a government-run dispensary with 2 beds for males and 2 for females, and it had a police force consisting of 1 sub-inspector, 1 head constable, and 12 constables.

== History ==
Sukul bazar, founded about a century ago by some members of a well to do Sukul ( Brahmin ) family . It shared with Perkinsginj the advantage of being near the Gumti .

== Villages ==
Shukul Bazar CD block has the following 71 villages:

Village name	Total land area (hectares)	Population (in 2011)
Manjh Gaon	647.7	2,123
Sansarpur	358.5	1,570
Khemmau	417.4	3,161
Tendua	231.5	2,383
Dakkhin Gaon Kyar	394.9	4,566
Shivali	207	2,069
Pali	840.6	4,432
Urer Mau	566.9	2,872
Tenwasi	179.1	1,438
Bubupur	683.2	4,049
Ahamadpur	415.9	3,826
Dhanesha Rajput	94	1,602
Mawaiya Rahmat Garh	511.2	7,795
Indriya	263.1	2,139
Ekkatajpur	180.5	1,550
Husen Pur	218.8	2,050
Sidhauli	203	988
Daranagar	66.6	1,255
Harkhu Mau	536.2	3,119
Sewara	259	2,788
Nimpur	206	1,227
Newaj Bhadar Garh	105.6	2,315
Nihal Garh Saida Patti	161.6	1,439
Pure Dayagir	51.1	236
Unch Gaon	823.1	4,537
Khalish Bahadur Pur	221.6	1,832
Gayas Pur	243.3	1,756
Kaji Pur	290.4	1,009
Ashis Pur	104.1	2,001
Nirhi Garh	46	379
Sidhana Mau	170.2	845
Fatte Pur	87.6	848
Mahauna Paschim	1,061.9	11,220
Mahauna Purab	473.1	4,348
Kisuni	689.4	6,032
Shahpur Shamshul Haque	50.4	195
Nadi	351.5	2,307
Bhandara Shekh Pur	233.4	1,241
Makhdum Kalan	689.2	4,798
Laliha Mau	70.1	357
Badal Garh	184.4	1,768
Jodil Mau	170.3	1,105
Banarpur	76.3	819
Mardanpur	365.8	3,514
Sujanpur	58.3	462
Baharpur	450.4	4,778
Puredip Chand	50.5	302
Bakhtawar Nagar	108.6	1,131
Muhiuddin Pur	122	1,081
Chhajju Pur	164	462
Para	183.9	1,342
Kundan Pur	135.3	1,682
Bhatmau	128.2	1,201
Jalali	61.1	660
Balapur	82.6	723
Sahabgarh	47.1	401
Saraiya Peerzada	56.6	1,224
Byaure Mau	374.1	2,587
Barsanda	473.1	5,584
Sauna	295.8	2,461
Rasul Pur	326	4,200
Tevar Pur	156.1	2,313
Hasanpur Tiwari	130.7	844
Jamuwari	134.1	972
Vishambher Patti	112.7	1,633
Sathin	539.8	4,529
Tirai	1	0
Mandwa	311.8	2,178
Baj Garh	186.5	2,025
Fazil Pur	74	883
Rondawa	64.6	963
