= Rambhual Nishad =

Indian politician

Member of Parliament, Lok Sabha
- Incumbent
- Assumed office June 2024
- Preceded by: Maneka Gandhi
- Constituency: Sultanpur

Member of 14th Uttar Pradesh Assembly
- In office 2002–2007
- Constituency: Kauriram

Personal details
- Born: 25 February 1960 (age 66) Barahalganj, Gorakhpur, Uttar Pradesh
- Party: Samajwadi Party
- Spouse: Mira Devi
- Parent(s): Jagdish Nishad, Gulabi Devi
- Occupation: Politician

Rambhual Nishad is an Indian politician. He is a member of Samajwadi Party.

== Political career ==
Nishad has been elected as a Member of Parliament from Sultanpur Lok Sabha constituency. He defeated Maneka Gandhi of the Bharatiya Janata Party.
