= Ganpat Sahai =

Indian politician

Member of Parliament, Lok Sabha
- In office 1967–1971
- Preceded by: Kunawr Krishna Verma
- Succeeded by: Kedar Nath Singh
- Constituency: Sultanpur, Uttar Pradesh

Personal details
- Born: 15 August 1882
- Party: Indian National Congress
- Spouse: Kesh Kumari Devi

Ganpat Sahai was an Indian politician. He was elected to the Lok Sabha, the lower house of the Parliament of India from the Sultanpur, Uttar Pradesh as a member of the Indian National Congress.
