= Abrar Ahmed (Samajwadi politician) =

Indian politician

Member of the Uttar Pradesh Legislative Assembly
- In office 2012–2022
- Succeeded by: Mohammad Tahir Khan
- Constituency: Isauli

Personal details
- Born: 11 August 1950 (age 75)
- Party: Samajwadi Party
- Spouse: Ajmatulnisha
- Children: 1 Boy & 1 Girl
- Parent: Late Rafaatullah
- Occupation: MLA
- Profession: Agriculture

Abrar Ahmed (born 11 August 1950) is an Indian politician representing the Samajwadi Party, being a member of the Uttar Pradesh Legislative Assembly from Isauli Assembly constituency.

== See also ==
- Seventeenth Legislative Assembly of Uttar Pradesh
