= Devmani Dwivedi =

Indian politician

Deomani Dwivedi

MLA, 17th Legislative Assembly
- In office 2017–2022
- Constituency: Lambhua, Sultanpur district

Personal details
- Born: 16 September 1964 (age 61) Sultanpur
- Party: Bharatiya Janata Party
- Spouse: Rekha Shukla
- Children: Desharth, Gargi, Rachna
- Parent(s): Parasnath Dwivedi and Awadhraji Dwivedi
- Education: M.A. (History hons.)-Gold medalist
- Alma mater: Allahabad University
- Occupation: MLA
- Profession: Politician

Deomani Dwivedi is an Indian politician and a member of 17th Legislative Assembly of Lambhua, Uttar Pradesh of India. He represents the Lambhua constituency of Uttar Pradesh and is a member of the Bharatiya Janata Party. He is a former IRTS officer and has served Indian Railway before he resigned in 2016 to join BJP. He was first to take forward the cause to restore the name of Sultanpur to Kushbhawanpur - The land of Lord Kush (Lord Ram’s Son). Following in his footsteps, many local organisations have stepped up for the same cause under his leadership and guidance.

A gold medalist from Allahabad University and a writer of Hindi small poetry on social and political issues, he has also worked as an assistant professor at Allahabad University before he left and joined UPPCS Police service, after which he resigned and joined UPSC-Indian Railway Services as a Traffic Officer (IRTS).

== Political career ==
Dwivedi has been a member of the 17th Legislative Assembly of Uttar Pradesh. Since 2017, he has represented the Lambhua constituency and is a member of the BJP.

== Posts held ==
#	From	To	Position	Comments
01	2017	2022	Member, 17th Legislative Assembly	
02	2015	2016	General Manager-Northern Railway (RLDA)	
03			Dy. SP- UP Police	
04			Assistant Professor: Allahabad University	

== See also ==
- Uttar Pradesh Legislative Assembly
