= Rajesh Gautam =

Indian politician of BJP party

Member of the Uttar Pradesh legislative assembly
- Incumbent
- Assumed office 2017
- Constituency: Kadipur, Sultanpur Uttar Pradesh

Personal details
- Party: Bharatiya Janata Party
- Parent: Jai Raj Gautam (Ex. Minister U. P. Govt.) Prema Gautam
- Occupation: MLA
- Profession: Politician

Rajesh Gautam is an Indian politician and a member of 17th Uttar Pradesh Assembly, Uttar Pradesh of India. He represents the ‘Kadipur’ constituency in Sultanpur district of Uttar Pradesh.

== Political career ==
Rajesh Gautam contested Uttar Pradesh Assembly Election as Bharatiya Janata Party candidate and defeated his close contestant Bhageluram from Bahujan Samaj Party with a margin of 26,406 votes.

== Posts held ==
#	From	To	Position	Comments
01	2017	Incumbent	Member, 17th Legislative Assembly	
