= Baldirai =

Town in Uttar Pradesh, India

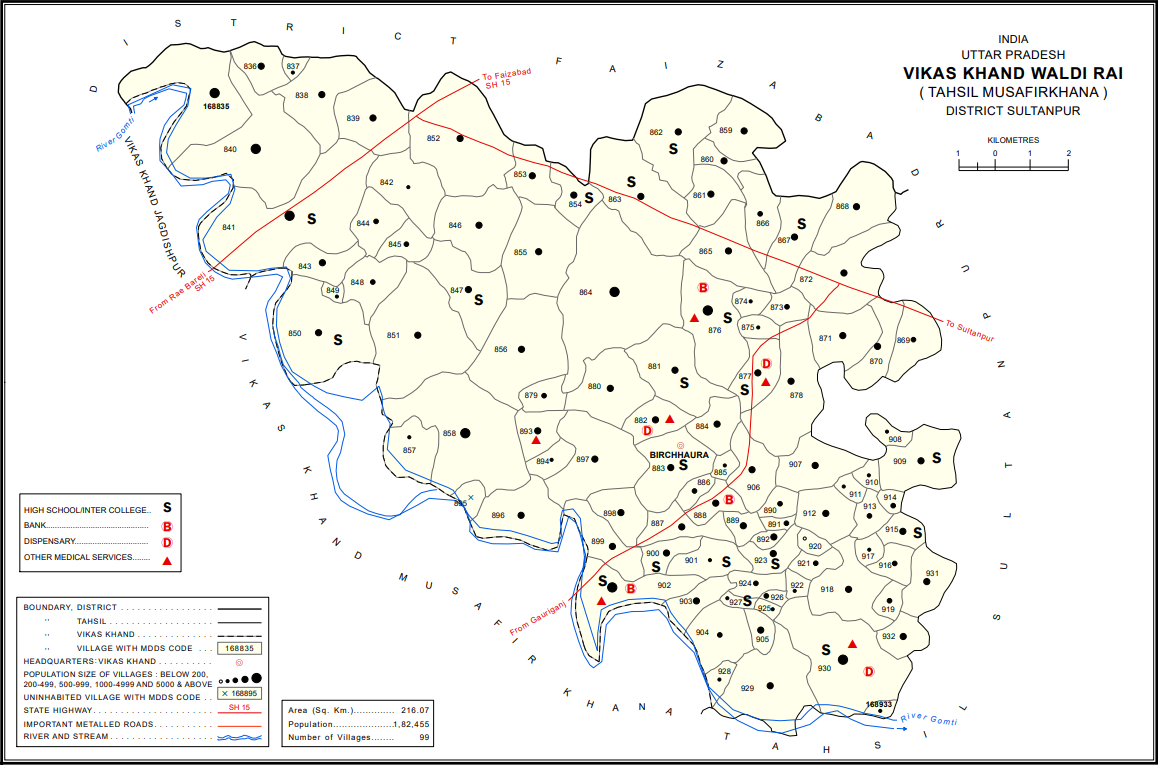
Map of Waldi Rai CD block

Baldirai is a town and tehsil of Sultanpur district, Uttar Pradesh, India. It consists of 99 villages (98 inhabited and 1 uninhabited) with a total population of 182,455 people, in 31,431 households.

== Demographics ==
As of 2011, Waldi Rai CD block has a population of 182,455 people, in 31,431 households. This population includes 92,058 males and 90,397 females. The corresponding sex ratio of 982 females to every 1000 males is slightly lower than the district rural average of 987. Members of the 0-6 age group numbered 27,598 as of 2011, or about 15.1% of the total. The sex ratio of this group is 930, which is slightly higher than the district rural average of 923. Members of Scheduled Castes numbered 40,828, or 22.38% of the total population; while members of Scheduled Tribes numbered 13, or 0.01% of the total. The literacy rate of Waldi Rai block as of 2011 is 67.04% (counting only people age 7 and up); literacy is higher among men and boys (78.02%) than among women and girls (55.96%). The Scheduled Castes literacy rate as of the same year is 53.56% (64.62% among men and boys and 42.25% among women and girls).

In terms of employment, 17.77% of Waldi Rai block residents were classified as main workers (i.e. people employed for at least 6 months per year) in 2011. Marginal workers (i.e. people employed for less than 6 months per year) made up 16.17%, and the remaining 66.05% were non-workers. Employment status varied according to gender, with 47.25% of men being either main or marginal workers, compared to only 20.40% of women.

Agriculture is the predominant source of employment in Waldi Rai block: 27.10% of the block's workers were cultivators who owned or leased their own land as of 2011, and a further 46.46% were agricultural labourers who worked someone else's land for wages. Another 5.85% were counted as household industry workers, and the remaining 20.59% were other workers.

== Villages ==
Waldi Rai CD block has the following 99 villages:

Village name	Total land area (hectares)	Population (in 2011)
Fatte Pur	530.4	5,057
Uska Mau	159	1,431
Vishwanath Pur	22.3	329
Taudhikpur	312.8	2,377
Sarai Baggha	306.2	1,366
Jarai Kalan	780	5,284
Huliyapur	875.4	9,256
Ranmusepur	275.4	256
Kakartola	191	1,745
Kuwasi	124.1	682
Baradand	118.8	527
Rampur Babuwan	241.9	2,575
Trihut	361	3,468
Gaura Parani	189.7	993
Jamalpur	16.9	477
Pipri	509.5	3,451
Umra	644.6	3,894
Dobhiyara	608	4,955
Hasai Mukundpur	141.1	1,252
Bhawani Garh	98.3	1,197
Meghmau	284.1	2,369
Dehariyawan	499.9	4,534
Pauli	192.1	321
Kanpa	975.6	6,020
Nichooti	214.7	1,505
Dakkhin Gaun	136.2	1,586
Atanagar	208.8	1,175
Soraun	385.8	3,889
Raiya	100	3,272
Dih	1,264.2	5,389
Govindpur	298.2	1,748
Makhdum Pur	147.4	918
Sighni	271.1	1,641
Dewra	278.7	2,225
Haighana Khurd	194	991
Nandrai	163.4	1,127
Sukhbaderi	222.2	1,229
Bahu Rawan	324.5	3,027
Madiyana	75	558
Ramnagar	55.1	422
Upri	60.3	402
Bihinidura	491.8	5,234
Patela	74.4	1,075
Haidhana Kalan	386.4	2,682
Loharia	101.9	885
Gaura Bara Mau	339.8	3,393
Mahuli	321.3	2,102
Akhari	179.1	1,498
Birchhaura	273.4	2,186
Alamau	131.3	1,166
Ganapur	16.6	411
Khanoha	58.4	776
Aliabad	98.8	2,005
Para	100.6	2,381
Sonbarsa	112.2	1,706
Kalyan Pur	75.2	617
Adampur	56.6	690
Natauli	52.1	1,170
Saini	129.8	1,420
Malpur	75.3	319
Pakesar	23	0
Asrafpur	340.3	2,513
Arwal	413.8	2,131
Chak Shiwapur	106	1,003
Bhawanipur	183.1	1,387
Kasba Mafiyat	138.5	1,472
Chak Shikra	47.8	446
Isauli	258	5,978
Chak Kari Bhit	176.5	1,279
Nishasin	159.4	869
Mohammad Kajipur	81.8	1,137
Nandauli	241.3	3,102
Durgapur	215.1	1,586
Phulpur	39.8	341
Baghuna	274.4	3,497
Gopalapur	41.4	344
Ranipur	43.8	211
Narsara	229.5	2,049
Bar Sawan	92.4	970
Chak Tenduwa	25.2	927
Dauno	88.6	1,058
Jagdishpur	83.8	593
Rainapur	57.5	461
Dariyapur	242.9	1,753
Lahurepur	61.5	716
Wallopur	35.3	163
Saflepur	56.5	802
Usri	38.8	343
Saidullapur	138.1	1,283
Chhatauna	109.3	835
Chak Fajilpur	18.1	309
Rasulpur	46.8	584
Mirpur	21.6	267
Gangapur	37.4	413
Wallipur	521.6	4,219
Hemnapur	679	7,457
Mau	167.7	1,651
Chakmusi	75.3	1,269
Rampurthuan	63.7	401
