= Ajmal Sultanpuri =

Indian poet (1923–2020)

Ajmal Sultanpuri (1923 – 29 January 2020) was an Indian poet in Urdu language. He was a native of Harakhpur in Sultanpur District, Uttar Pradesh. In 1967, He was beaten by few village men because he was trying to protest against social discrimination. After that, he moved to Sultanpur and never went back to Harakhpur.

He was awarded the Lifetime Achievement Award by Uttar Pradesh Urdu Academy in March 2016, for his contribution to Urdu poetry.

Kahan hai mera Hindustan and Mai tera Shahjahan are two of his popular poems, which he recited at mushairas (poetry recitals). His poetry was based on his hardships during his lifetime as well as on communal harmony and multiculturalism of India. His most famous poem is below He was admitted to Karunashray Hospital on 6 January 2020 due to poor health. He went into coma and died on 29 January 2020 at the age of 97.
