= Santosh Pandey (Uttar Pradesh politician) =

Indian politician

Member of the Uttar Pradesh Legislative Assembly
- In office 2012–2017
- Constituency: Lambhua Vidhan Sabha constituency

Personal details
- Born: 25 November 1975 (age 50) Bhadainya, Lambhua Sultanpur
- Party: Samajwadi Party
- Spouse: Neetu Pandey
- Children: Shrishti Pandey, Swastik Pandey, Srijan Pandey
- Occupation: Politician

Santosh Pandey is an Indian politician and a member of the Samajwadi Party from the state of Uttar Pradesh. Pandey is a member of the Sixteenth Legislative Assembly of Uttar Pradesh representing the Lambhua Vidhan Sabha constituency. His father is Ram Chandra Pandey and his mother is Sumitra Pandey.

== Posts held ==
#	From	To	Position	Comments
01	2012	2017	Member, 16th Legislative Assembly	
