= Tat patti =

Indigenous floor cover made of Jute

Tat Patti (Tat pati) is an indigenous floor cover of narrow width made of coarse Jute. It was produced in Punjab region. Tat patti was utilized as seating for students in government schools and provided to inmates in jail as well. It is still in use in rural India.

== History ==
Tat Patti is made since the times of Mughals; a 17th-century French gem merchant and traveler Jean-Baptiste Tavernier mentions Tat made of Jute in his travel history to India.

== Product ==
Tat Patti is a handloom product of carpet weaving, and it is a narrow width carpet of Jute or hemp, similar to a long narrow mat, rug, or cheap coarse carpet. The texture of the cloth is similar to a gunny sack used for bagging. Tat weaving was also present in parts of Gujarat. Carpet weavers were stitching pieces together after weaving them in small pieces. (The sizes were 9 yards X 8 inches).

== Manufacturing ==
Manufacturing Tat Patti was common in villages and rural Punjab. Tat weaving was one of the crafts in Punjab jails. Prisoners were used to weaving Tat Patti along with other coarse cotton cloths during their term in prisons.

National Council of Educational Research and Training was used to take the initiative for vocational education of Tat weaving along with various other pieces of training programs.

== Use ==
Tat Patti was used as a sitting arangement in schools. As a floor cover, floor mat, and a cheap carpet to cover and sitting purpose.

== See also ==
- Dhurrie – Cotton flatweave carpet
- Kilim – Flat tapestry-woven carpet
