= Bachgoti Rajput =

Bachgoti, Bachalgoti or Bachal, Bachhal are a Hindu Rajput clan found scattered in Uttar Pradesh and Rajasthan states of India. During Muslim rule of India, many of them converted to Islam and are now part of the Muslim Rajput community known as Bachgoti Khanzada. E. G. Barrow in his book mentions Bachal Rajputs formed part of Indian Army especially Rajputana Rifles Among Rajputs Bargujars accepted wives from Bachal Rajputs
