= Narottampur =

Narottampur নরোত্তমপুর
- Village
- Location in Bangladesh
- Coordinates: 22°31′N 90°24′E
- Country: Bangladesh
- Division: Barisal Division
- District: Barisal District
- Upazila: Banaripara Upazila

Population (2022)
  - Total: 1,780
- Time zone: UTC+6 (Bangladesh Time)

Narottampur is a village in Banaripara Upazila of Barisal District in the Barisal Division of southern-central Bangladesh.

According to the 2022 Census of Bangladesh, Narottampur had 432 households and a population of 1,780.
