= Damodarpur =

Neighborhood in Jharkhand

- Neighborhood
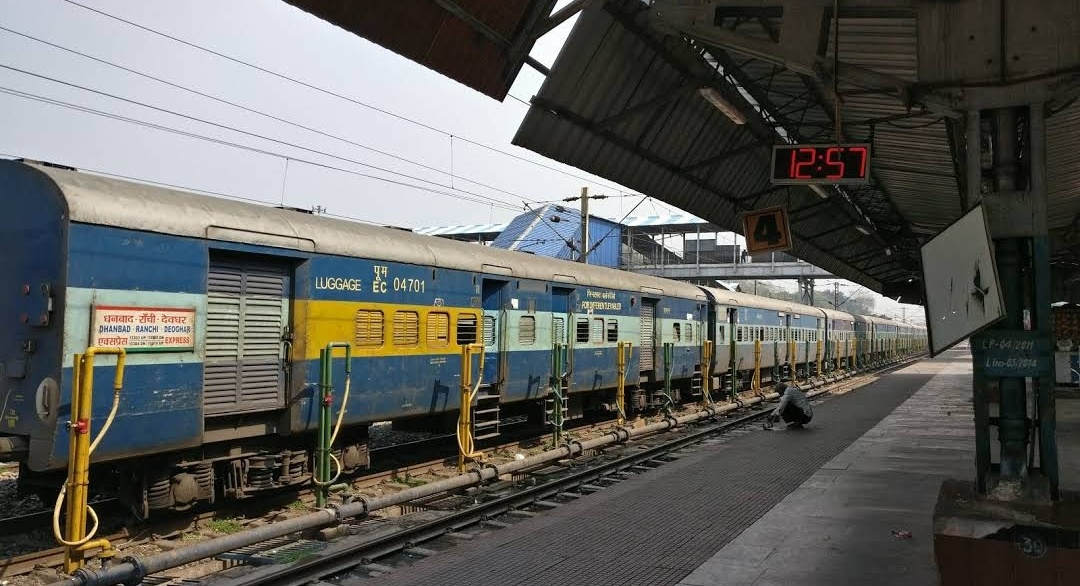

- Location in Jharkhand, India Damodarpur (India)
- Country: India
- State: Jharkhand
- District: Dhanbad

Government
  - Type: Municipal Corporation
  - Body: Nagar Palika

Area
  - Total: 1.00 km^{2} (0.39 sq mi)
- Elevation: 199 m (653 ft)

Population (2011)
  - Total: 4,030
  - Density: 4,030/km^{2} (10,400/sq mi)

Languages
  - Official: Hindi, Urdu
- Time zone: UTC+5:30 (IST)
- PIN: 826004 (Dhanbad)
- Zip/PIN: 826004
- Vehicle registration: JH 10
- Website: dhanbad.nic.in

Damodarpur is a neighbourhood in Dhanbad, Jharkhand, India.

== Overview ==
Damodarpur is a neighborhood in Dhanbad, Jharkhand. It comes under Dhanbad Municipal Corporation.

== Demographics ==
It has an area of 1 km^{2}. It has a total population of 4,030, out of which 2,105 are males and 1,925 are female. The main language is Hindi.

== Education and healthcare ==
Damodarpur has 3 schools and 1 hospital.
