= Sripati Mishra =

Indian politician

13th Chief Minister of Uttar Pradesh
- In office 19 July 1982 – 2 August 1984
- Preceded by: V. P. Singh
- Succeeded by: N. D. Tiwari

Personal details
- Born: 4 December 1923 Sultanpur, United Provinces, British India
- Died: 8 December 2002 (aged 79) Lucknow, Uttar Pradesh, India
- Party: Indian National Congress
- Education: M.A., LLB
- Alma mater: University of Lucknow, Banaras Hindu University
- Profession: Politician

Sripati Mishra (4 December 1923 – 8 December 2002) was an Indian politician belonging to Indian National Congress. He served as Chief Minister of Uttar Pradesh during the 1980s.

== Birth ==
Sripati Mishra was born in a Brahmin family in Sheshpur village in Sultanpur. Mishra pursued higher education, earning an M.A. from Banaras Hindu University and an LLB from Lucknow University before entering politics in the early 1960s.

== Political career ==
Sripati Mishra was first elected to Vidhan Sabha and became its speaker in 1980. He remained in this office from 7 July 1980 till 18 July 1982. He became Chief Minister after resignation of Vishwanath Pratap Singh in 1982. He remained in office from 19 July 1982 till 3 August 1984. Dr Yogendra Narain served as his Principal Secretary. Later, he was elected to the Lok Sabha in 1984.

He was among a few politicians who reached the top slot in the state from village politics.

Also, he was senior member of the Uttar Pradesh Bar Council.

== Death ==
Sripati Mishra died at Balrampur Hospital, Lucknow after a prolonged illness.

== Legacy ==
A college named after him, Pt. Sripati Mishra Degree College in Tawakkalpur Nagara (Surapur), Kadipur, Sultanpur, Uttar Pradesh has been established in his memory and currently this college is one of the best educational institute in district.

Political offices
Preceded by Banarsi Das	Speaker of UP Legislative Assembly; 7 July 1980 – 18 July 1982	Succeeded by Dharam Singh
Preceded by Vishwanath Pratap Singh	Chief Minister of Uttar Pradesh; 19 July 1982 – 3 August 1984	Succeeded by Narayan Dutt Tiwari
