= Sultanpur, Uttar Pradesh =

Sultanpur
- City
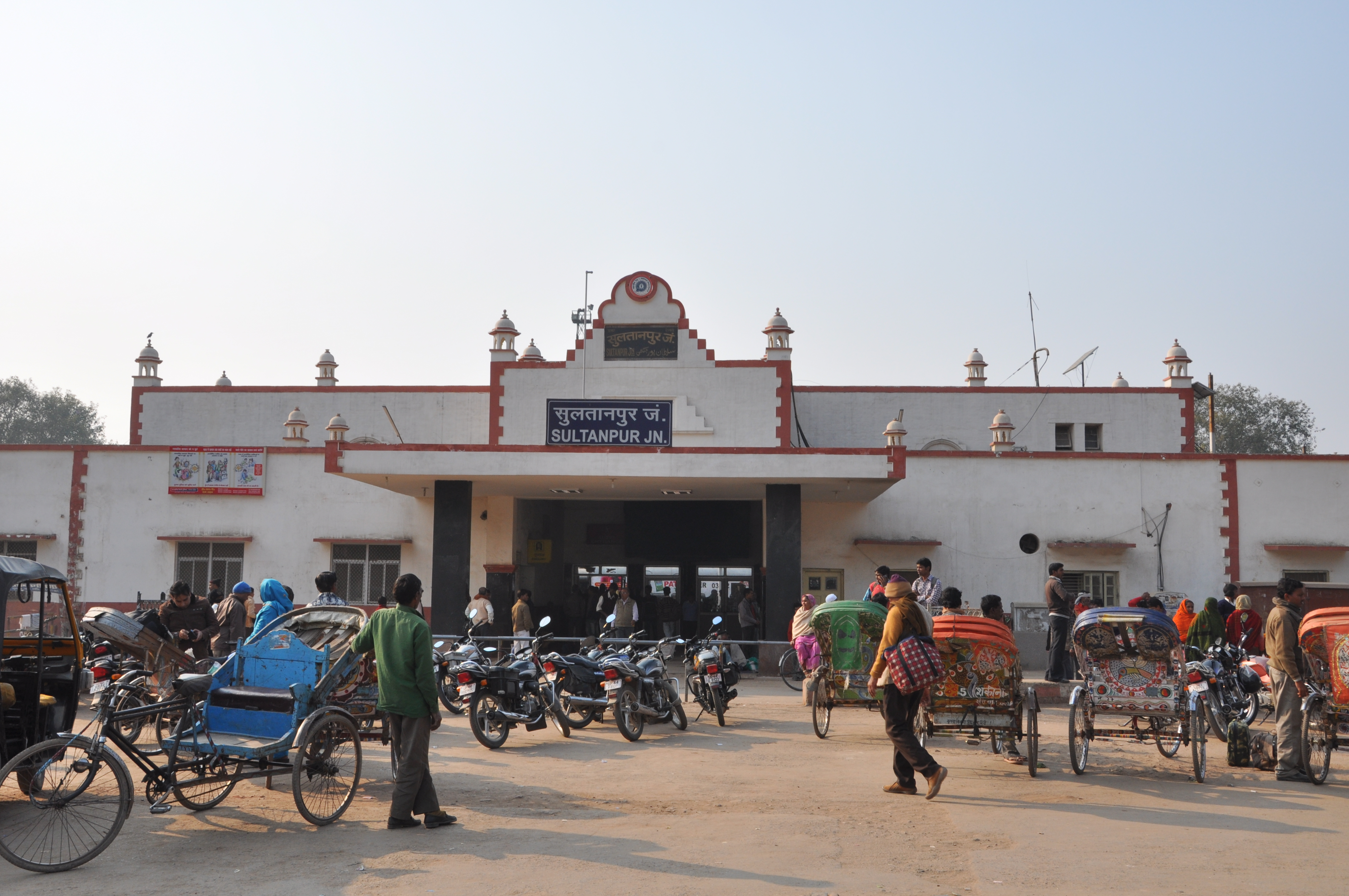
- Railway Station, Sultanpur

- Location within Uttar Pradesh Location within India
- Coordinates: 26°15′30″N 82°04′20″E
- Country: India
- State: Uttar Pradesh
- District: Sultanpur

Government
  - Body: Government of Uttar Pradesh
- Elevation: 95 m (312 ft)

Population (2011)
  - Total: 107,640

Language
  - Official: Hindi
  - Additional official: Urdu
  - Regional: Awadhi
- Time zone: UTC+5:30 (IST)
- PIN: 228001
- Vehicle registration: UP-44
- Website: sultanpur.nic.in

Sultanpur is a city situated in the Indian state of Uttar Pradesh on the banks of the Gomti, which Hindus consider a holy river. The city is the administrative headquarters of Sultanpur district and is a part of Ayodhya division in Uttar Pradesh, India. It is situated 135 kilometers east of state capital Lucknow.

== History ==
According to legend, In the Sultanpur area beside the Gomti river it is said that Kush the son of Ram was born with badh(बाध) so it was the birthplace of Kusa, the son of Rama. This was identified with the Kusapura mentioned by Xuanzang, who said that Gautama Buddha taught here for six months and that it had a stupa built at the time of Ashoka which was then in disrepair.

The region was invaded and sacked during the Ghaznavid invasions of Kannauj. The town was under Bhar rule until around 1200. It was said that Muhammad of Ghor's general Qutb ud-Din Aibak invaded and conquered the region and town. The then Bhar rulers of Kusbhawanpur were captured and the Ghurid forces executed them and the horses were seized. In 1305, a Rajput rebellion occurred in the region and the local Delhi Sultanate governor was defeated and expelled from the town by the Rajput rebels. When it was heard to the Sultan Alauddin Khalji that this incident took place, he gathered an army and attacked them at once, on the opposite bank of the Gomti River from Kusbhawanpur defeating the rebels and sending them fleeing. Then Alauddin Khalji settled Muslims in the area of Mahmudpur located in Sultanpur. The city of Kusbhawanpur was renamed after the Alauddin Khalji's title Sultan and a new city was founded on the site, called Sultanpur.

Old Sultanpur was originally located on the left bank of the Gomti and is mentioned on several occasions by Muslim historians as the site of battles. It was a prosperous town with several mohallas, or wards. At some point, though, the British established a military station and cantonments on the opposite (right) bank of the Gomti, at a village then called Girghit, and this eventually took on the name Sultanpur instead while the old town declined. The old town was described in 1839 as being in a state of disrepair, without commerce or industry, and with a population of just 1,500 people. The only remains of the Bhar period were two brick wells on the south, "about a mile from the river", and a large mound or dih called Majhargaon in the middle of town, which was supposedly the remains of the old Bhar palace. Atop Majhargaon was a fort built by the sultan, then partly ruined, and containing houses belonging to the faujdar and his followers. Northwest of the fort was a mosque also built by the sultan, and there were also a couple of other mosques built by the Sayyid chaudhris of the pargana. The town then had "many old brick dwelling houses and a few new ones". Old Sultanpur was eventually razed to the ground by the British after the Indian Rebellion of 1857, in retaliation for the murder of two British officers in the town at the beginning of the uprising.

As for the new Sultanpur, it was also called Chhaoni Sarkar by officials and Kampu, or "the camp", by locals. It was built up on the site of the old cantonment, which was removed in 1861. Sultanpur was made a municipality in June 1869, with a municipal committee; a municipal board was formed in September 1884. In 1890 the Victoria Manzil was built for the first agricultural exhibition, and it served as the town hall and the meeting place for the municipal board under British rule. At the turn of the 20th century, the town also had a police station and hospital, jail, poorhouse, leper asylum, and a dispensary which was rebuilt in 1895, at the same time as the Amethi female hospital was built in town, almost entirely funded by Raja Bhagwan Bakhsh Singh of Amethi. The town also had three markets: Perkinsganj, Shawganj, and Partabganj, the last of which opened in 1895 and was named after Partab Bahadur Singh, the raja of Kurwar.

== Geography and climate ==
Sultanpur is the headquarters of the Sultanpur district, the north side of the district is bounded by Ayodhya district; the south side by Pratapgarh district; the west side by Barabanki and Amethi districts; and the east side by Azamgarh, Ambedkarnagar, and Jaunpur districts.

Sultanpur has an average elevation of 95 metres (312 ft). The geography of Sultanpur comprises plain lands, except for some regions around the Gomti River, which drains almost the whole city and district. The southern part of the city drains towards the Sai River flowing through the Pratapgarh district. The only significant minerals found in the region are in Kanker district. It joins Sharda Canal parts 16 and 17 jointly in the whole district and fulfills the requirements of water for agriculture.

Climate data for Sultanpur (1991–2020, extremes 1996–2020)
Month	Jan	Feb	Mar	Apr	May	Jun	Jul	Aug	Sep	Oct	Nov	Dec	Year
Record high °C (°F)	30.6 (87.1)	35.7 (96.3)	41.9 (107.4)	45.8 (114.4)	45.8 (114.4)	47.0 (116.6)	43.6 (110.5)	38.8 (101.8)	37.5 (99.5)	35.7 (96.3)	34.6 (94.3)	29.5 (85.1)	47.0 (116.6)
Mean daily maximum °C (°F)	20.8 (69.4)	26.5 (79.7)	33.0 (91.4)	39.0 (102.2)	39.7 (103.5)	37.8 (100.0)	33.1 (91.6)	32.8 (91.0)	32.6 (90.7)	31.5 (88.7)	28.1 (82.6)	22.8 (73.0)	31.5 (88.7)
Mean daily minimum °C (°F)	7.7 (45.9)	10.8 (51.4)	15.6 (60.1)	20.8 (69.4)	24.6 (76.3)	26.9 (80.4)	26.2 (79.2)	25.9 (78.6)	24.9 (76.8)	19.8 (67.6)	12.9 (55.2)	8.5 (47.3)	18.8 (65.8)
Record low °C (°F)	1.0 (33.8)	1.9 (35.4)	7.8 (46.0)	12.0 (53.6)	16.8 (62.2)	21.5 (70.7)	22.0 (71.6)	22.5 (72.5)	19.6 (67.3)	11.8 (53.2)	6.1 (43.0)	1.7 (35.1)	1.0 (33.8)
Average rainfall mm (inches)	17.0 (0.67)	14.8 (0.58)	9.5 (0.37)	8.3 (0.33)	26.3 (1.04)	137.4 (5.41)	302.7 (11.92)	260.5 (10.26)	181.1 (7.13)	38.8 (1.53)	3.2 (0.13)	7.0 (0.28)	1,006.7 (39.63)
Average rainy days	1.3	1.6	0.9	0.8	2.4	6.3	13.1	12.3	8.3	1.6	0.4	0.6	49.6
Average relative humidity (%) (at 17:30 IST)	72	58	44	34	41	56	78	82	82	79	77	78	65
Source: India Meteorological Department

== Demographics ==
According to the 2011 Indian Census, Sultanpur had a total population of 107,640, of which 56,420 were males and 51,220 were females. The population within the age group of 0 to 6 years was 11,647. The total number of literates in Sultanpur was 84,080, which constituted 78.1% of the population with male literacy of 81.5% and female literacy of 74.4%. The effective literacy rate of the 7+ population of Sultanpur was 87.6%, of which male literacy was 91.6% and female literacy rate was 83.2%. The Scheduled Castes population was 7,706. Sultanpur had 17,954 households in 2011.

== Transportation ==
=== Road ===
Sultanpur is connected to nearby cities through the 4-lane Lucknow to Jaunpur-Saidpur NH 731 and the 2-lane Prayagraj to Ayodhya NH 330. Uttar Pradesh State Road Transport Corporation (UPSRTC) is the major public transport apart from other commercial modes run by private agencies. Sultanpur is also connected by the Purvanchal Expressway which starts from Lucknow to Ghazipur.

=== Train ===
Sultanpur Junction railway station (station code: SLN) connects Sultanpur to major cities in India. The station was established in 1872 as part of the Oudh and Rohilkhand Railway along the Varanasi–Lucknow line. It falls under the Lucknow division of the Northern Railway zone.

=== Air ===
The nearest airport to Sultanpur is Ayodhya International Airport (60 km) and Prayagraj Airport which is 99 kilometers away. Chaudhary Charan Singh International Airport (Lucknow) is 140 km from Sultanpur and is connected by 4-lane NH 731.

== Education ==
- Kamla Nehru Institute of Technology

== Notable people ==
- Kumar Kartikeya, Indian Cricketer plays for Mumbai Indians in IPL
- Mohammad Tahir Khan, politician and former MP from BSP and elected in 2022 Uttar Pradesh Assembly Elections from Samajwadi Party .
- Sripati Mishra - former Chief Minister of Uttar Pradesh
- Sulaiman Shikoh, Mughal prince and the eldest son of the crown prince Dara Shikoh
- Sanjay Singh - Rajya Sabha MP from Aam Aadmi Party
- Ajmal Sultanpuri, Indian Urdu poet
- Majrooh Sultanpuri, a writer in the Bollywood industry and Urdu poet
- Ramashankar Yadav, known by the penname Vidrohi, was an Indian poet and social activist
