= Devendra Bahadur Roy =

Indian politician

Member of Parliament, Lok Sabha
- In office 1996–1999
- Preceded by: Vishwanath Das Shastri
- Succeeded by: Jai Bhadra Singh
- Constituency: Sultanpur, Uttar Pradesh

Personal details
- Born: 3 October 1945
- Party: Bharatiya Janata Party
- Spouse: Gayatri Roy

Devendra Bahadur Roy is an Indian politician. He was elected to the Lok Sabha, the lower house of the Parliament of India from the Sultanpur, Uttar Pradesh as a member of the Bharatiya Janata Party.
