= Kamla Nehru Institute of Technology =

Engineering college in Sultanpur, India

- Other name: KNIT
- Motto: Yogaḥ karmaśu kauśalaṃ
- Type: Government Engineering College
- Established: 1976
- Director: Prof. Rajeev K Upadhyay
- Students: 1900+
- Location: Sultanpur, Uttar Pradesh, India
- Campus: Urban, 100 acres (40 ha)
- Website: www.knit.ac.in

Kamla Nehru Institute of Technology (KNIT Sultanpur) is a state government, autonomous engineering institution located in Sultanpur, Uttar Pradesh, India. It is affiliated to Dr. A.P.J. Abdul Kalam Technical University (formerly known as Uttar Pradesh Technical University). It has been ranked amongst the top engineering institutes under AKTU.

== History ==
KNIT was established as the Faculty of Technology in Kamla Nehru Institute of Science and Technology, Lucknow, in 1976 by the Kamla Nehru Memorial Trust. It was taken over by the government of Uttar Pradesh in 1979 with a view to develop an engineering institute in the Eastern region of Uttar Pradesh. In 1983 it was registered as a separate society and was renamed as the Kamla Nehru Institute of Technology.

The institute is affiliated to Dr. A.P.J. Abdul Kalam Technical University, Lucknow. Kamla Nehru Institute of Technology, Sultanpur has been officially ranked number 1 based on the performance of the students.

== Courses of study ==
The institute offers the following courses under a semester system.

- Undergraduate programs: B.Tech (4 years - 8 semesters)
- Master of Computer Applications (MCA) (2 years - 4 semesters)
- Full-time postgraduate (M.Tech)
- Part-time (M.Tech) programme (five semesters)
- Doctoral programmes
- Computer Science and Engineering
- Electronics Engineering
- Electrical Engineering
- Civil Engineering
- Applied Mathematics
- Applied Physics
- Applied Chemistry
- Humanities

=== Departments ===
The institute has following academic departments:

- Department of Applied Sciences & Humanities
- Department of Civil Engineering
- Department of Electrical Engineering
- Department of Electronics Engineering
- Department of Mechanical Engineering
- Department of Computer Science & Engineering (includes M.C.A and Information Technology)
- Workshop
- Central Library
