= Mohammad Tahir Khan =

Indian politician

Member of parliament Lok Sabha
- In office 2004-2009
- Constituency: Sultanpur

Assembly Member for Isauli

Member of Uttar Pradesh Legislative Assembly
- In office 2022–Present

Personal details
- Born: 15 August 1975 (age 51) Sultanpur, Uttar Pradesh, India
- Party: Samajwadi Party
- Spouse: Shaheen Bano
- Children: 3 sons and 3 daughters
- As of 17 September, 2006

Mohammad Tahir Khan (born 15 August 1975) is an Indian politician for the Sultanpur (Lok Sabha constituency) in Uttar Pradesh and currently he is Samajwadi Party MLA from Isauli Assembly constituency.
