= Lambhua =

- Town
- Location in Uttar Pradesh, India Lambhua (India) Lambhua (Asia)
- Coordinates: 26.13°N 82.21°E
- Country: India
- State: Uttar Pradesh
- District: Sultanpur

Government

Population (2011)
  - Total: 8,201

Language
  - Official: Hindi
  - Regional: Awadhi
- Time zone: UTC+5:30 (IST)
- Vehicle registration: UP-44
- Sex ratio: 1000:1014 ♂/♀

Lambhua is a town, tehsil, and a Nagar panchayat in Sultanpur district in the Indian state of Uttar Pradesh. It is located on the National Highway 731.

== Demographics ==
As of the 2011 Census of India, Lambhua had a population of 8201. Males constitute 52% of the population and females 48%. Lambhua has an average literacy rate of 82.66%, more than the state average of 67.68%: male literacy is 90.59%, and female literacy is 73.92%.

== Transportation ==
=== Rail ===
Lambhua is well connected with major cities of India through the Indian Railways network. Lambhua Railway Station comes under Northern Zone of Indian Railways. Some important trains from Lambhua are the Varuna Express to Lucknow Varanasi, Kanpur, the Howrah Amritsar Express connecting Kolkata and Amritsar, Sadbhawna Express to Bihar, and the Farakka Express to Delhi and Kota Patna express connecting Kota, Patna and other stations.

=== Road ===
Lamhua is situated on the National Highway 56(NH-56), 154 km from Lucknow, the capital city of Uttar Pradesh and about 128 Km from Holi city Varanasi. State highway connects Lambhua from Allahabad, 122 km, and Faizabad, situated at 78 km away. State Road Transport buses as well as hired public conveyances are available frequently for these places.

=== Air ===
An upcoming Ayodhya Airport is the nearest airport from Lambhua, Sultanpur.

== See also ==
Khunshekhpur
