= Sultanpur district =

Sultanpur District
- District of Uttar Pradesh
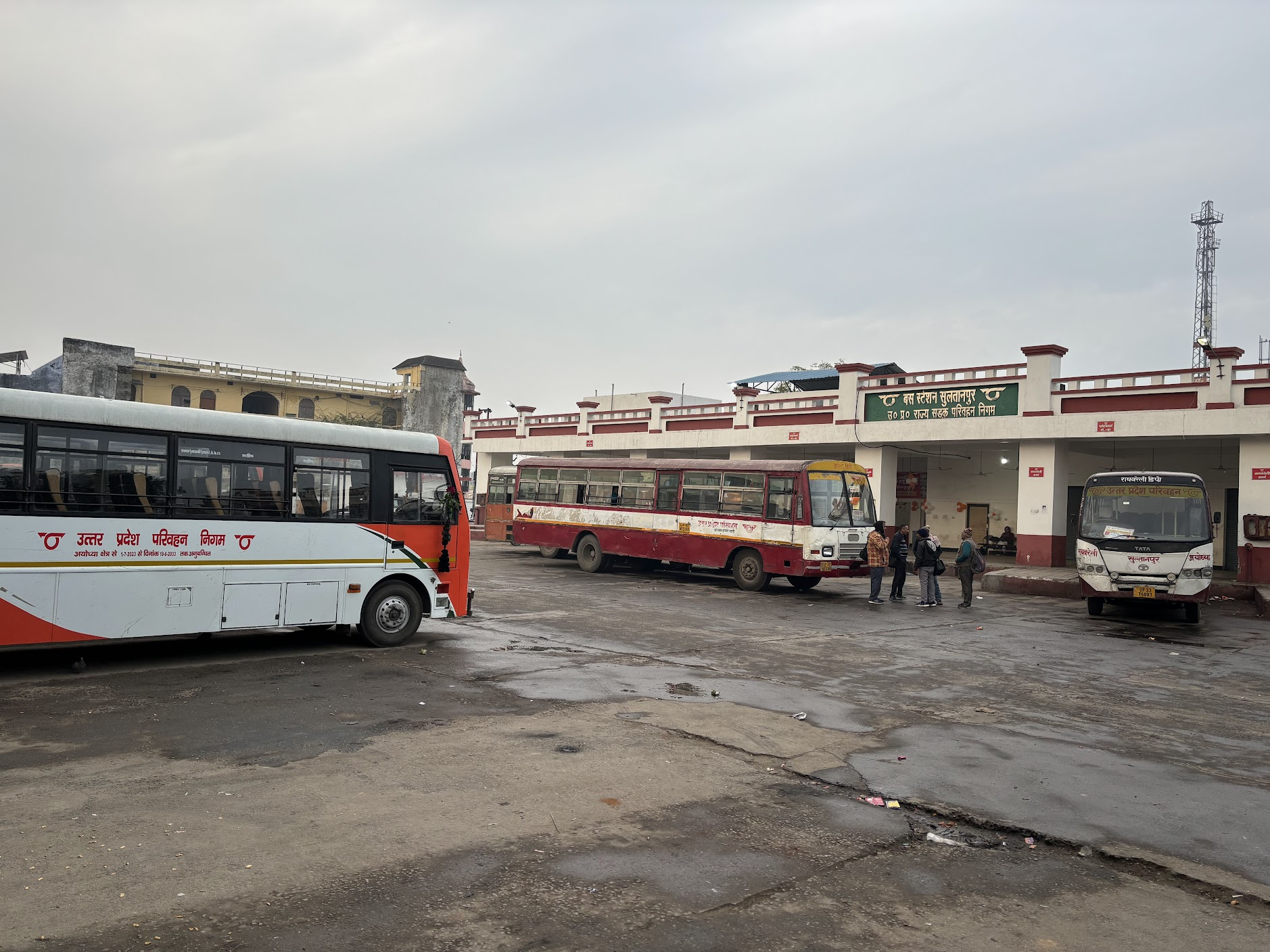
- Sultanpur Bus Depot

- Location of Sultanpur district in Uttar Pradesh
- Coordinates (Sultanpur, Uttar Pradesh): 26°15′N 82°00′E
- Country: India
- State: Uttar Pradesh
- Division: Ayodhya
- Headquarters: Sultanpur
- Tehsils: Lambhua, Kadipur, Sultanpur, Jaisinghpur, Baldirai

Government
  - District Magistrate: Kumar Harsh (IAS)
  - Lok Sabha constituencies: Sultanpur
  - Vidhan Sabha constituencies: 5

Area
  - Total: 2,672.89 km^{2} (1,032.01 sq mi)

Population (2011)
  - Total: 2,249,036
  - Density: 841.425/km^{2} (2,179.28/sq mi)
  - Urban: 146,892
- Time zone: UTC+05:30 (IST)
- Vehicle registration: UP-44
- Website: sultanpur.nic.in

Sultanpur district is a district in the Awadh region of the Indian state of Uttar Pradesh. This district is a part of Ayodhya division of the state. The administrative headquarters of the district is Sultanpur city. The total area of Sultanpur district is 2672.89 Sq. km.

As of 2011, Sultanpur district has a population of 2,249,036 people.

== History ==
At the time of the Ain-i-Akbari, the area now covered by Sultanpur district was divided between the sarkars of Awadh, Lucknow, and Jaunpur, all in the subah of Awadh, as well as the sarkar of Manikpur in the subah of Allahabad. Sultanpur itself was one of the mahals, or parganas, that made up the sarkar of Awadh; it corresponded to the later pargana of Miranpur, minus its southern portion which in Akbar's day formed part of the Kathot mahal in Manikpur. It may have also included some of the later pargana of Baraunsa, which was also called Sultanpur-Baraunsa. The mahal of Sultanpur provided a force of 7,000 infantry and 200 cavalry to the Mughal army and was assessed at a tax value of 3,832,530 dams. The rest of Baraunsa then belonged to the small mahal of Bilahri, which supplied a military force of 2,000 infantry and 50 cavalry and was assessed at 815,831 dams. Like Sultanpur, the mahal of Bilahri was held by the Bachgotis and had a brick fort at its capital. The two mahals of Kishni and Sathin (or Satanpur) were also in the sarkar of Awadh; they remained separate entities until 1750, when they were amalgamated into the pargana of Jagdishpur. The last of the mahals in the sarkar of Awadh was Thana Bhadaon, a small mahal which appears to correspond with the later pargana of Asal. There is still a village called Bhadaon in this area; it used to give its name to a tappa in pargana Sultanpur.

Two mahals in the Lucknow sarkar would later form part of Sultanpur district: Amethi and Isauli. Amethi was later transferred into the sarkar of Manikpur. In Akbar's time, Manikpur also had two mahals in the present district: Jais, which was broken up beginning sometime before 1775, and Kathot, which as mentioned above covered the southern parts of pargana Miranpur. Finally, there were two more mahals in the sarkar of Jaunpur: Chanda and Aldemau.

Sultanpur district remained split between the two subahs of Awadh and Allahabad until the late 1700s, when the latter was finally broken up. By this time, the entire district had come under the Nawabs of Awadh. Nawab Saadat Ali Khan II enacted an administrative reform that replaced the subahs and sarkars with new divisions, called nizamats and chaklas. Under this new arrangement, Sultanpur was made the seat of a large nizamat with four component chaklas: Sultanpur, Aldemau, Jagdishpur, and Pratapgarh. The last of these corresponds with the present-day Pratapgarh district.

From 1793 to 1856, 27 nizams held office in Sultanpur, although several of them held office twice or were only in office for a very short time. Among the more significant nizams were Sital Parshad (in office 1794–1800), Mir Ghulam Hussain (1812–14 and 1818–23), Raja Darshan Singh (1828–34 and 1837–38) and his son Raja Man Singh (1845–47), and Agha Ali Khan (the final nazim, in office from 1850 to 1856). The nizams themselves were fairly powerless to deal with the district's powerful landowners, whose power had become so entrenched that they could get away with merely paying the ordinary revenue demands and otherwise being left alone to do as they pleased.

After the British annexation of Awadh in 1856, Sultanpur remained the seat of a district, although the administrative boundaries in the region were redrawn — Aldemau, for example, now formed part of Faizabad district. Under the original British arrangement, Sultanpur district comprised 12 parganas, but this was changed in 1869: three parganas were transferred into the district from Faizabad, while five parganas were transferred out of the district. The new parganas were Isauli, Baraunsa, and Aldemau; while the ones that were removed were Subeha (which was transferred into Barabanki district), Inhauna, Rokha-Jais, Simrauta, and Mohanganj (which were all transferred into Raebareli district). The resulting setup would remain in place through the 20th century, with four tehsils: Sultanpur (including the parganas of Miranpur and Baraunsa), Amethi (including Amethi and Asal), Musafirkhana (including Musafirkhana, Isauli, Jagdishpur, and Gaura Jamun), and Kadipur (including Chanda and Aldemau).

== Geography ==
Sultanpur district is located in the Awadh region of Uttar Pradesh. It borders Ayodhya district in the north, Pratapgarh district in the south, Amethi district in the west, Barabanki district, Ambedkar Nagar district, Azamgarh district and Jaunpur district in the east.

The Gomti River is the principal river passing through the centre of the district, while the Sai drains the southern portion. The district lies at an average elevation of 95 metres (312 ft) and is irrigated by Sharda Canal.

== Demographics ==
Historical population
Year	Pop.	±% p.a.
1901	1,097,006	—
1911	1,061,205	−0.33%
1921	1,016,338	−0.43%
1931	1,064,516	+0.46%
1941	1,115,311	+0.47%
1951	1,298,249	+1.53%
1961	1,418,750	+0.89%
1971	1,649,258	+1.52%
1981	2,050,140	+2.20%
1991	2,571,706	+2.29%
2001	3,214,832	+2.26%
2011	3,797,117	+1.68%

Sultanpur district (after bifurcation) had a population of 2,249,036. 6.53% of the population lives in urban areas. Scheduled Castes made up 481,735 (21.42%) of the population.

The 2011 Indian census used the old district boundaries, where Sultanpur district consisted of Amethi, Gauriganj, Jaisinghpur, Kadipur, Lambhua, Musafirkhana, and Sultanpur sub-districts (tehsils). When Amethi district was created, Amethi, Gauriganj, and Musafirkhana sub-districts were moved to Amethi district. The effect of this change is shown in the table below as "new boundaries" - it does not take account of Baldirai sub-district, which did not exist at the time of the 2011 census.

=== Languages ===
Languages in Sultanpur district (2011 census)
1. Hindi (70.0%)
2. Awadhi (25.4%)
3. Urdu (4.35%)
4. Others (0.24%)

Hindi is the official language of the district with Urdu as additional official language. The language spoken by the denizens of the district is Awadhi, a dialect in the Hindi continuum spoken by over 38 million people in the Awadh region.

At the time of the 2011 Census of India, 70.03% of the population in the district spoke Hindi, 25.38% Awadhi and 4.35% Urdu as their first language.

=== Religion ===
Religions in Sultanpur district (2011)
Religion	Percent
Hinduism	82.76%
Islam	16.55%
Other or not stated	0.69%
Distribution of religions

Sultanpur has a majority-Hindu population. Muslims are more concentrated in urban areas.

== Administration ==
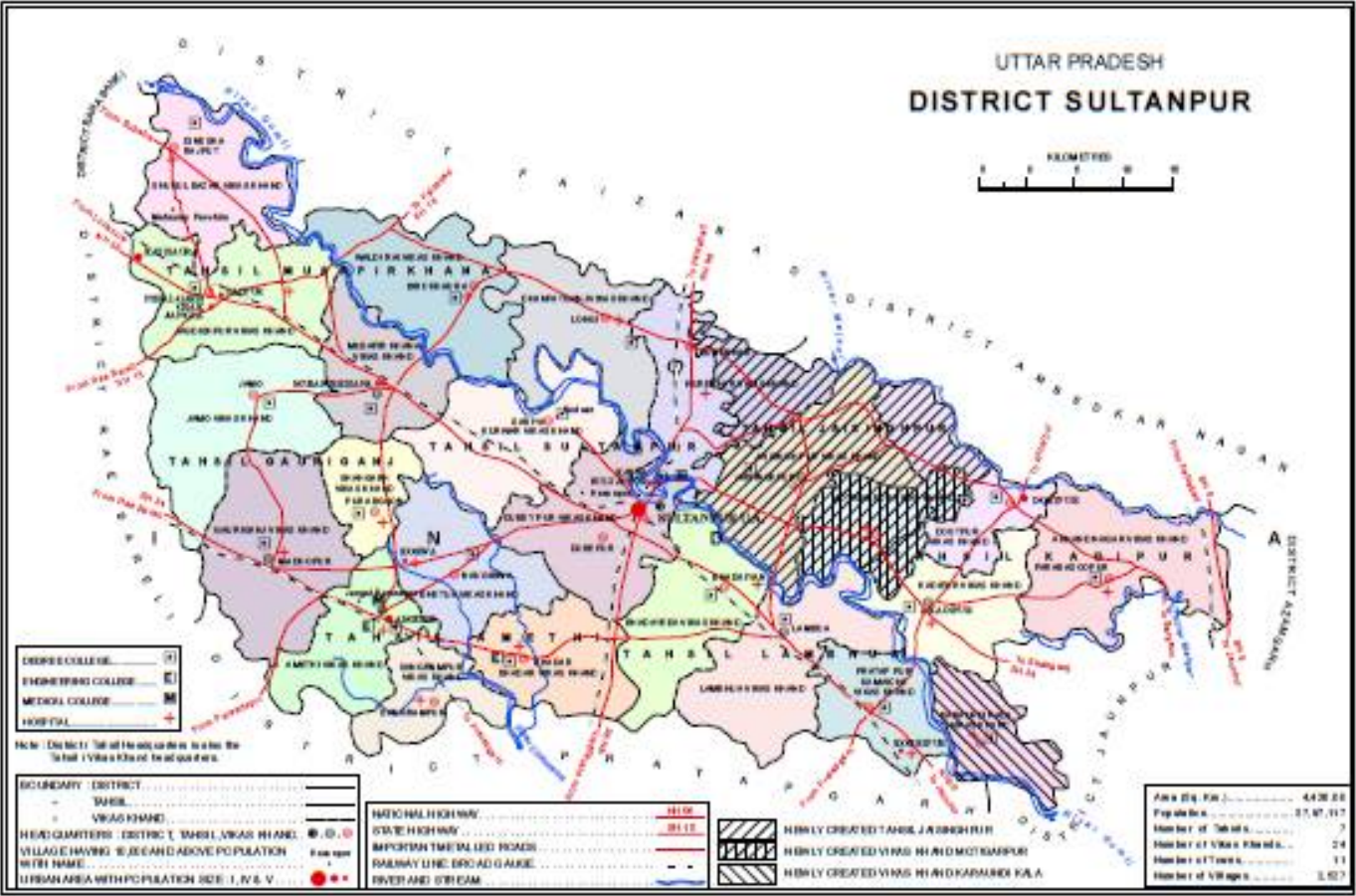
Pre-2010 map of subdivisions of Sultanpur district including the bifurcated Amethi district

After its bifurcation in 2010, the Sultanpur district has five tehsils which includes Sultanpur Sadar, Kadipur, Lambhua, Baldirai and Jaisinghpur. The Amethi, Musafirkhana, and Gauriganj tehsils form part of the Amethi district, which was formed on 1 July 2010. District has one municipality, four town areas and 14 development blocks. Besides Sultanpur city, important towns are Dostpur, Kadipur, Koeripur, Lambhua. Sultanpur is divided into 19 police stations for the maintenance of law and order.

The subdivisions of Sultanpur district are:

- Baldirai tehsil
  - Baldirai block
  - Dhanpatganj block
- Sultanpur Sadar tehsil
  - Kurebhar block (part)
  - Kurwar block
  - Dubeypur block
- Jaisinghpur tehsil
  - Jaisinghpur block
  - Motigarpur block
  - Bhadaiya block
  - Kurebhar block (part)
  - Dostpur block (part)
- Lambhua tehsil
  - Lambhua block
  - Pratappur Kamaicha block
- Kadipur tehsil
  - Dostpur block (part)
  - Kadipur block
  - Akhand Nagar block
  - Karaundi Kala block

=== Municipalitites ===
The district has municipalities for one city and four towns.

1. Nagar Palika Parishad, Sultanpur (Sultanpur city)

2. Nagar Panchayat, Lambhua

3. Nagar Panchayat, Dostpur

4. Nagar Panchayat, Kadipur

5. Nagar Panchayat, Koiripur

=== Villages ===
There are total 1727 villages in the 5 tehsils of Sultanpur district.

- Shukul Bazar

== Culture ==
The culture of Sultanpur reflects Awadhi heritage. The main languages spoken are Awadhi (23.4%) and Hindi (73.3%), with Urdu (3.08%) as per 2011 Census.

Major festivals celebrated include Diwali, Holi, Eid, Navratri and Dussehra. Local fairs are held on the banks of Gomti River during Kartik Purnima. Traditional folk forms such as Birha, Nautanki and Kathak are popular in the district.

== Education ==
=== Colleges ===
- Kamla Nehru Institute of Technology
- Government Polytechnic Kenaura Sultanpur

== Notable people ==
- Prem Adib, actor from Sultanpur city
- Sripati Mishra, former Chief Minister of Uttar Pradesh
- Kumar Kartikeya, Indian Cricketer, plays for Mumbai Indians in IPL since 2022
- Ajmal Sultanpuri, Urdu poet native of Harakhpur village
- Majrooh Sultanpuri, Urdu poet and lyricist in India's Hindi language film industry
- Sanjay Singh, politician and Rajya Sabha member
- D. P. Tripathi, politician and former general secretary of the Nationalist Congress Party, from Sultanpur city
- Jameel Ahmed Khan – Freedom fighter from Bethra village, Sultanpur; refused handcuffs and rode horseback to jail, awarded Tamra Patra by PM Indira Gandhi in 1972
- Mehndi Hasan – Nazim of Sultanpur appointed during 1857 uprising, established headquarters at Hasanpur and led Battle of Chanda<ref>{{cite news|url=https://timesofindia.indiatimes.com/city/lucknow/when-the-lords-of-spears-crossed-swords-with-british/articleshow/92323423

== See also ==
- Ayodhya district
- Jaunpur district
