= List of people from Lucknow =

Notable people from or associated with Lucknow, India

This is a list of notable people from or associated with the Indian city of Lucknow, Uttar Pradesh.

== Academics, education and science ==
- Salman Akhtar, psychoanalyst
- S. P. Chakravarti, father of electronics and telecommunications engineering education in India
- Herbert V. Günther, professor of philosophy
- Mukesh Haikerwal, general practitioner and former federal president of the Australian Medical Association, Companion of the Order of Australia since 2011
- Kailas Nath Kaul, botanist and agricultural scientist
- Gopal Khanna, 5th director of the Agency for Healthcare Research and Quality, United States Department of Health and Human Services
- Veena Talwar Oldenburg, professor of history
- Anil K. Rajvanshi, rural development expert Padma Shri 2022
- Maqbool Ahmed Lari, services in literature and education (Urdu) Padma Shri 1971
- Kalbe Sadiq, Islamic scholar and educationist
- Abhishek Shukla, geriatrician and palliative care physician
- Shubhanshu Shukla, ISRO astronaut and Indian Air Force test pilot
- Dalip Kumar Upreti, lichenologist
- Ajoy Ghatak, phycisist
- Sumita S. Chakravarty, professor of Media Studies, New York
- Romila Thapar, Historian of ancient India, Padma Bhushan (1983)
- Kailash Nath Dikshit, former Director General of Archaeological Survey of India; Padma Bhushan

== Arts and culture ==
- Jafar Mir Abdullah, art enthusiast from the royal family of Awadh.
- Jan Nisar Akhtar, poet and lyricist; father of Javed Akhtar
- Muzaffar Ali, filmmaker
- Naushad Ali, film musician
- Amitabh Bhattacharya, Bollywood singer and lyricist
- Nivedita Bhattacharya, theatre and television actress
- Pahari Sanyal, veteran Bengali actor and vocalist
- Chinmoy Lahiri, classical vocalist
- Sukumar Bose, painter and artist
- Kankana Banerjee, classical vocalist
- Malabika Kanan, classical vocalist
- Jaya Bhattacharya, film and television actress
- Rita Bhaduri, film and television actress
- Rita Ganguly, classical vocalist and danseuse
- Gita Ghatak, Rabindra Sangeet exponent
- Kumkum Dhar, Kathak dancer
- Palash Sen, singer, composer & founder of rock band "Euphoria"
- Ranveer Brar, chef, television host
- Pali Chandra, Kathak dancer
- Anup Jalota, classical singer and musician
- Cliff Richard, British singer and musician; now settled in Portugal and Barbados
- Mohammad Shakeel, contemporary artist
- Kavi Pradeep, poet and lyricist; known for writing patriotic songs

== Actors and singers ==
- Deepti Sadhwani, actress
- Disha Patani, actress
- Urfi Javed, actress
- Aahana Kumra, actress
- Talat Mahmood, singer
- Sumona Chakravarti, actress
- Tia Bajpai, singer
- Sachet Tandon, composer, vocalist and lyricist; part of duo Sachet-Parampara
- Ali Fazal, actor
- Amit Mishra, singer
- Kanika Kapoor, singer
- Shantanu Moitra, music composer
- Gayatri Iyer, singer
- Baba Sehgal, singer
- Aditi Sharma, actress
- Kushal Tandon, actor
- Richa Panai, actress
- Zoya Afroz, actress, Miss India
- Anaika Soti, actress
- Nandini Singh, actress
- Amrapali Gupta, actress
- Surendra Pal, actor
- Kumar Gaurav, actor
- Arti Singh, actress
- Gungun Uprari, actress
- Cliff Richard, singer
- Amit Sadh, actor
- Anil Rastogi, actor
- Malini Awasthi, singer
- Roshan Abbas, television anchor
- Javed Akhtar, writer
- Vartika Singh, actress, Miss India

== Activists ==
- Sehba Hussain, activist, former member of National Advisory Council
- Runa Banerjee, social worker and co-founder of the Self Employed Women's Association (SEWA)

== Writers, including journalists and poets ==
- Mir Babar Ali Anis, Marsiya writer (poet)
- Chhannu Lal Dilgeer (Ghulam Hussain), Marsiya writer (poet)
- Iftikhar Arif, poet
- Brij Narayan Chakbast, poet
- Mirza Dabeer, Marsiya writer (poet)
- Altaf Fatima, novelist
- Muzaffar Ahmad Lari, Urdu write
- Rosie Llewellyn-Jones, Lucknow historian
- Majaz, poet
- Josh Malihabadi, poet
- Rajesh Talwar, playwright, novelist
- Vinod Mehta, journalist
- Mir Taqi Mir, poet
- Amaresh Misra, historian
- Maulana Hasrat Mohani, poet
- Syed Sulaiman Nadvi, Islamic historian
- Syed Abul Hasan Ali Hasani Nadwi, Islamic scholar and writer
- Amritlal Nagar, novelist
- Suryakumar Pandey, poet
- Manikonda Chalapathi Rau, journalist
- Mirza Hadi Ruswa, poet
- Ratan Nath Dhar Sarshar, novelist
- K.P. Saxena, poet
- Abdul Halim Sharar, Lucknow historian
- Gaura Pant Shivani, writer
- Sri Lal Sukla. novelist
- Shaukat Siddiqui, novelist
- Pratap Narayan Tandon, novelist
- Srijan Pal Singh, writer and advisor to A. P. J. Abdul Kalam
- Ruchita Misra, writer
- Bhagwati Charan Verma, writer
- Yashpal, novelist, freedom fighter
- Mohsin Zaidi, poet
- Masroor Jahan, novelist and short-story writer
- Zameer Akhtar Naqvi poet
- Yogesh Praveen, historian

== Business and professionals ==
- Agha Hasan Abedi, Pakistani banker philanthropist, and convicted felon
- Manoj Bhargava, US-based entrepreneur; founder and CEO of 5-Hour Energy Drink
- Ved Rattan Mohan, MD of Mohan Meakin
- Prashant Pathak, Canadian investor and entrepreneur
- Rajesh Gopinathan, MD and CEO of Tata Consultancy Services
- Subrata Roy, businessman; worker director of Sahara India Pariwar, the world's largest employer
- Syed Safawi, entrepreneur

== Military ==
- FS Hussain, PAF Air Commodore and legendary aerobatic pilot
- Denzil Keelor, Air Marshal, IAF
- Gunjan Saxena, IAF helicopter pilot
- John Alexander, soldier
- John Coleman, soldier
- Edward Hilton, soldier
- William Stephen Raikes Hodson, British officer
- Henry Montgomery Lawrence, soldier
- Claude Martin, French major general who fought for the British; established La Martiniere Schools at Lucknow, Lyons and Calcutta
- Sir James Outram, 1st Baronet, British general
- Manoj Kumar Pandey, 1st battalion, 11 Gorkha Rifles, Param Vir Chakra
- Arthur Skey, Royal Navy rear-admiral
- George Powell Thomas, British soldier, artist and poet

== Politics ==
- Intezar Abidi, politician
- K. C. Singh Baba, Parliament
- Hemvati Nandan Bahuguna former Chief Minister of Uttar Pradesh
- Mirza Hameedullah Beg, former Chief Justice of India
- Shuja-ud-Daula, Nawab of Oudh
- Sandeep Dikshit, Parliament
- Asaf-Ud-Dowlah, Nawab of Oudh
- Chandra Bhanu Gupta, three-time Chief Minister of Uttar Pradesh
- Amir Haider, Senior Congress Leader
- Mohammad Haleem, former Chief Justice of Pakistan
- Mohammad Hidayatullah, former acting President of India (1969–1969); former vice-president of India (1979–1984); 11th Chief Justice of India (1968–1970)
- Sheila Kaul, former Union Cabinet Minister in India
- Rajkumari Amrit Kaur, former Minister of Health
- Marghoob Ahmad Lari, former state minister
- Begum Hazrat Mahal, Queen of Oudh
- Satish Mishra, lawyer
- Brajesh Pathak, politician
- Ashok Kumar Rawat, politician
- Mohammad Yunus Saleem, lawyer
- Sayed, Nawab of Oudh
- Wajid Ali Shah, Nawab of Oudh
- Shankar Dayal Sharma, former president of India
- Kirti Vardhan Singh, Parliament
- Kaushal Kishore, politician
- Sarvraj Singh, politician
- Atal Bihari Vajpayee, former prime minister of India
- Anne Warner, Australian politician
- Lalji Tandon, politician
- Sudhanshu Trivedi, politician

== Sports ==
- Afaq Hussain, cricketer
- Shahid Mahmood, cricketer
- Ravinder Pal Singh, hockey
- Apoorva Sengupta, cricketer
- Rinku Singh, professional wrestler signed with WWE's development territory NXT
- Suresh Raina, cricketer
- Arthur Skey, cricketer
- R.P. Singh, cricketer

== Others ==
- Laxmi Singh, first woman police commissioner of U.P.
- Versha Verma, social worker
- Akash Banerjee, political satirist
- Jayanto Banerjee, cartoonist
- Neelabh Banerjee, cartoonist
