= Awadhi people =

Ethnolinguistic group

अवधी 𑂃𑂫𑂡𑂲 اودھی

Total population
- 4.72 million

Regions with significant populations
- India (Awadh) and Nepal (Terai)

Languages
- Awadhi; Additionally Hindi-Urdu

Religion
- Majority: Hinduism; Minority: Islam; Christianity; Jainism; Buddhism

Related ethnic groups
- other Indo-Aryan peoples

The Awadhi people or Awadhis (Devanagari: अवधी, Kaithi: 𑂃𑂫𑂡𑂲, Perso-Arabic: اودھی) are an Indo-Aryan ethno-linguistic group who speak the Awadhi language and reside in the Awadh region of Uttar Pradesh. Many Awadhis also migrated to Madhya Pradesh, Bihar, Jharkhand, Gujarat, Maharashtra, Odisha in India and some adjoining regions of the Terai in Nepal, and in addition 3 per cent of Nepalis are Awadhi speakers. Awadhi people can be found throughout the world, most notably in Fiji, Guyana, Mauritius, South Africa, Suriname, Trinidad and Tobago, the United States, the United Kingdom, Canada, the Netherlands, Australia, and New Zealand. Historically, Indo-Aryans dominated the North Indian Gangetic Planes; thus, the Awadhi language continuously evolved over the centuries in the Awadh region of Uttar Pradesh.

== Language ==
As of 2011, the Awadhi language is spoken by just over 4 million people. In India, the Awadhi speaking population was noted as approximately 3.85 million, while in Nepal native speakers are estimated to be 500,000 people.

Linguistically, Awadhi is a distinct language with its own grammar. However, the Indian government considers Awadhi to be a dialect under Hindi due to political reasons. Awadhi is not formally taught in any institution.

== Cuisine ==
Consisting of both vegetarian and non vegetarian dishes, Awadhi cuisine has influences that can be linked to the Mughal Empire. It is similar to much of North Indian cuisine and Pakistani cuisine. Awadhi cuisine is known for its use of aromatics and spices, such as cardamom and saffron, in a slow fire cooking process. There is also notable variety in ingredients that are cooked, such as paneer and mutton.

In addition, there are rice, curry, dessert, and chaat preparations that are specific to Awadhi cuisine.

== Notable Awadhis ==
- Ram Manohar Lohia
- Afroz Ahmad
- Muzaffar Ali
- Nahshad Ali
- Abhishek Bachchan
- Amitabh Bachchan
- Harivansh Rai Bachchan
- Arunima Sinha
- Piaa Bajpai
- Sarita Bhadauria
- Pali Chandra
- Abhishek Chaubey
- Rudrasen Chaudhary
- Narendra Deva
- Shanta Devi
- Babu Gulabrai
- Ali Sardar Jafri
- Cheddi Jagan
- Kailas Nath Kaul
- Imdad Khan
- Wahid Khan
- Akhil Kumar
- Amaresh Misra
- Satish Mishra
- Gopaldas Neeraj
- Shringi Rushi
- Babu Himmat Sah
- Anand Satyanand
- Ramchandra Shukla
- Lal Pratap Singh
- Babu Bhoop Singh
- Raja Bhagwan Baksh Singh
- Raja Lal Madho Singh
- Bajrang Bahadur Singh
- Arunima Sinha
- Raju Srivastav
- Nivedita Tiwari
- Bekal Utsahi
- Bhagwati Charan Verma
- Anand Sen Yadav
- Mitrasen Yadav
