= Roniaur =

Bania caste mostly found in India and Nepal

The Rauniyar is a Bania caste mostly found in India and Nepal. They use Rauniyar, Mahajan, Shah, Anand, Ranjan, Rauniwal as their surnames.The Rauniyar is a sub-group within the Awadhi Bania community

== India ==
In India, the Rauniyar call themselves as Namnihar. They claim to have come from Awadh some three hundred years ago. They are found throughout Lucknow, Ayodhya, Prayagraj, Varanasi, Mirzapur, Maharajganj, Magadh, Muzaffarpur, Munger, Bhagalpur, Nawada, Bodh-Gaya, Gorakhpur, Deoria, Tamkuhi Raj and Odisha. Their common surnames are Sah, Shah and Rauniyar also. They are strictly endogamous and practice clan exogamy. The Roniaur speak Purvanchali in east Uttar Pradesh, Bhojpuri in western Bihar and commonly speak Hindi.

=== Present circumstances ===
The Rauniyar are divided into three territorial groupings, the Purbia, Panchnaha and Bail Kuchnaha. Marriages within each of these groups aren't a common practice. They are further divided into several exogamous clans. Their traditional occupation has been in the business of textiles and food grains. A few Rauniyar are jagirdars, but they rarely ever cultivated their own land, depending on sharecroppers. Their customs are similar to other Awadh Baniya, such as the Omar and Magadh Baniyas such as Kaithal/Sinduriya(Vermillion sellers) and Pansari.

The Rauniyar can be found as traders, landowners, entrepreneurs, large-scale business owners, consultants, and shopkeepers. Many used to be substantial jagirdars, but the land reforms carried out after independence in 1947 and seen a break up of the larger estates. Like other Bania communities, they are undergoing urbanization. Many rural Raniaur are village shopkeepers and money lenders. They have a statewide caste association, the Raniaur Mahasabha, which acts both as an instrument of social control as well as a communal welfare association.

== Nepal ==
In Nepal, the Rauniyar or Roniaur live in Terai region mainly in Eastern Part, however, they are also found in other Terai regions as well as the Indra Chowk area of Kathmandu. They use Shah, Sah or simply Rauniyar as their surname. Most of the Rauniyars who are Nepalese citizens do not change their surname. Various clans in the community don't necessarily share common beliefs. They speak Nepali, Bhojpuri and Maithili. Their main occupations are Business, jagirdar and are involved in different Jobs in various sectors.
