= Amethi (disambiguation) =

Amethi is a town in Amethi district in Ayodhya division, of Indian state of Uttar Pradesh.

Amethi may also refer to:

- Amethi district, Uttar Pradesh
- Amethi Estate, Taluqdari Estate in Oudh
- Amethi Temple, Varanasi
- Amethi railway station, Amethi district
- Amethi (Lok Sabha constituency), which covers Amethi district
- Amethi, Lucknow, a town and nagar panchayat in the Lucknow district in the Indian state of Uttar Pradesh
