= St. Francis' College =

Private school in Lucknow, India

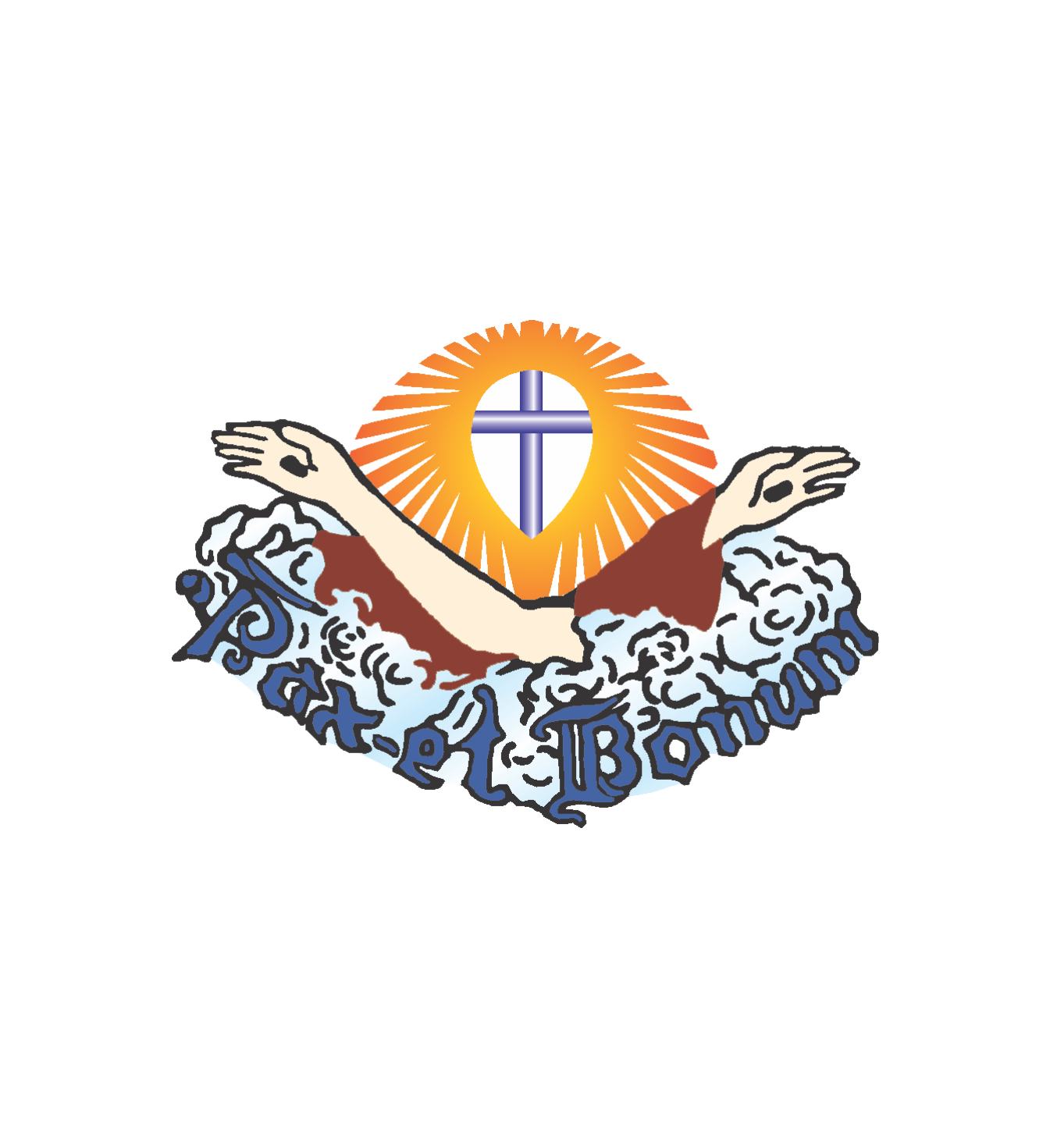
- Lucknow, Uttar Pradesh; India

Information
- Type: Unaided Anglo-Indian school
- Motto: Pax-et Bonum ("Peace and all good [be with you].")
- Established: 1885
- Principal: Rev. Fr. Raju V. D’Souza
- Staff: 150 excluding non-teaching staff
- Enrollment: 4000
- Yearbook: The Franciscan
- Affiliations: CISCE i.e. Council for the Indian School Certificate Examinations, New Delhi
- College Captain: Ojasv Arora
- Website: stfrancislucknow.com

St. Francis' College, located in Lucknow, Uttar Pradesh, stands as one of India's premier senior secondary educational institutions for boys. Established in 1885, the college is owned and administered by the Roman Catholic Diocese of Lucknow, a charitable religious society. Originally founded under the name St. Francis' School and Orphanage, the institution has evolved over nearly a century and a half into a cornerstone of academic and character development in northern India.

The college is widely recognized for its rigorous commitment to discipline and its holistic approach to education, which balances scholarly pursuits with physical development and extracurricular engagement. This ethos has fostered a legacy of producing well-rounded students who have achieved prominence across various sectors. The alumni network includes a significant number of corporate leaders, high-ranking military officers, and public figures, underscoring the school's historical role in shaping the nation's leadership.

Beyond its academic reputation, the college has a varied sporting culture with emphasis on moral and social values. The campus remains a landmark in Lucknow, rooted in history, that continues to attract students seeking a comprehensive and disciplined educational environment.

== Notable alumni ==
- Neal Mohan, chief executive officer of YouTube
- Govind Mohan, Incumbent Home Secretary of India, Senior bureaucrat I.A.S. Officer & I.I.T. (B.H.U) Alumnus
- Denzil Keelor, Indian Air Force officer
- Trevor Keelor, Indian Air Force officer
- Anil K. Rajvanshi, Padma Shri awardee and Director of Nimbkar Agricultural Research Institute
- Prashant Pathak, entrepreneur and investor
- Jimmy Shergill, Bollywood actor
- Gopal Khanna, former Director of the Agency for Healthcare Research and Quality, USA.
- Rajesh Gopinathan, CEO of Tata Consultancy Services
- Sapan Saxena, Indian author

== See also ==
- Saint Francis of Assisi
- Catholic Diocese of Lucknow
- Loreto Convent
- La Martiniere Lucknow
