= Syed Safawi =

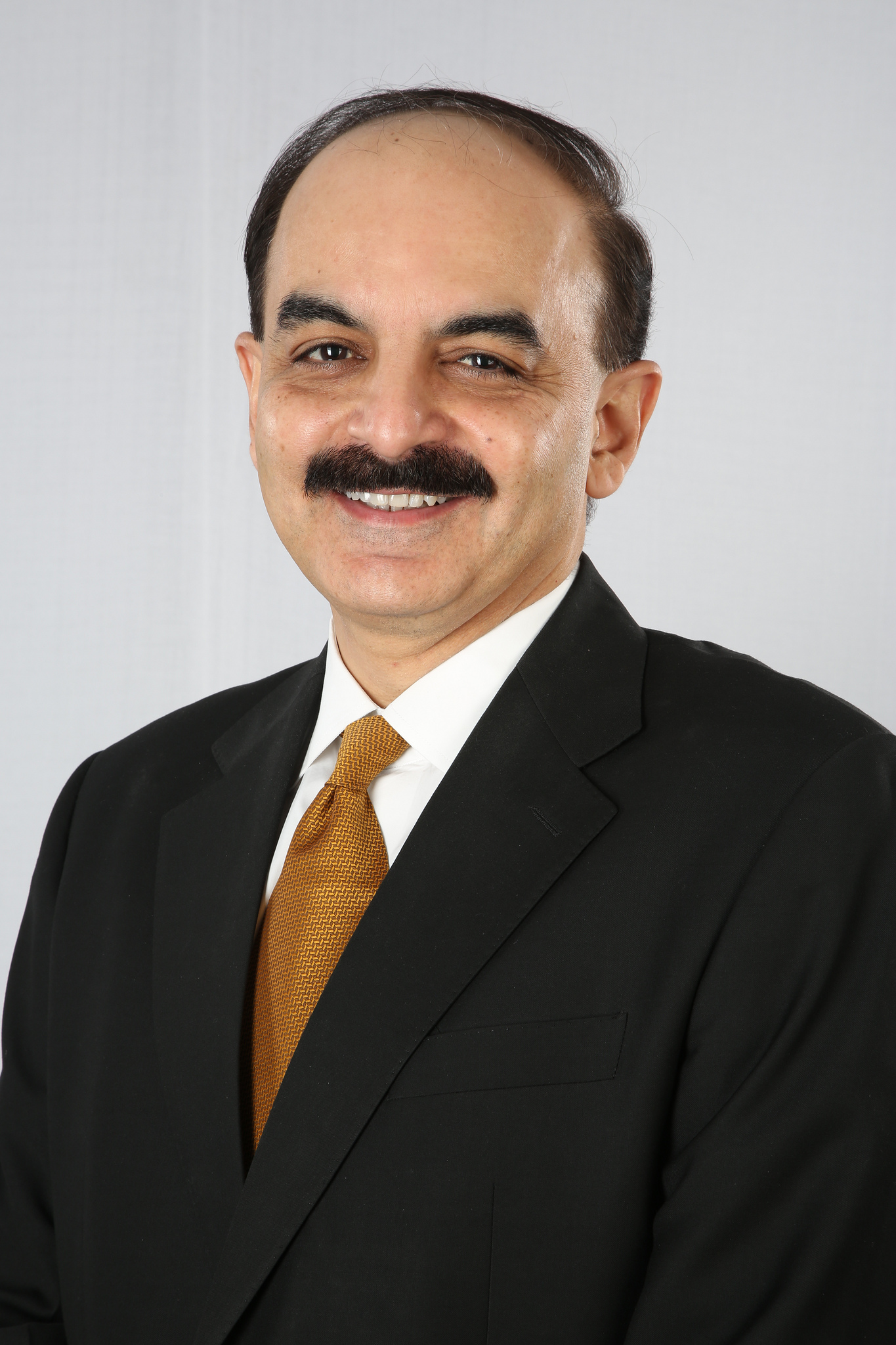
- Born: Lucknow, India
- Education: IRMA, Wharton School
- Occupation: Business executive

Syed Safawi is a business executive in the telecommunications industry.

He was the managing director and Group Chief Executive Officer (CEO) of VLCC. Prior to it, he was the chief executive officer (CEO) of Viom Networks, a telecom infrastructure company, the largest independent operator in India, according to Business Standard.

== Biography ==
He is from Lucknow, India.

He graduated from the Wharton School in the US with an MBA. He went to IRMA for postgraduation and during initial period worked with Gujarat Co Operative or Amul.

Before 2009, he worked with Coca-Cola and Bharti Airtel. At Bharti Airtel Limited he was the executive director, responsible for the East and West India operations along with the international wireless operations. At Airtel, he was also responsible for the global calling cards business and the B2B business of mobile services.

In Dec. 2009, he became president and CEO of Reliance Communication's national mobility business, until 2012. Syed was with Reliance Communications Limited (RCom) as the president and CEO of the Wireless Business and Chairman of the Reliance Management Board.

He began leading Viom Networks as CEO in July 2012. Viom around 2016 was acquired by ATC Telecom Infrastructure.

In 2014, he became the honorary founding president of Imamia Chamber of Commerce and Industry (ICCI).

In 2016, he became CEO and managing director of the healthcare business of VLCC, VLCC Health Care Limited.

In 2018, he was based in Delhi. In 2019, he was still Viom Networks CEO. He is a co-founder of Padup Ventures Services LLP.

== See also ==
- List of people from Lucknow
- Tribhuvan Sahkari University
