= Rosie Llewellyn-Jones =

British scholar

Rosie Llewellyn-Jones MBE
- Education: SOAS University of London
- Occupations: Scholar on Lucknow culture, author, editor

Rosie Llewellyn-Jones is a British scholar with an expertise on Lucknow and its culture. Based in London, where she worked for the Royal Society for Asian Affairs, Llewellyn-Jones is a regular visitor to Lucknow and has authored several books on the city.

She has a PhD in Urdu from the SOAS University of London. She is currently editor of the journal of the British Association for Cemeteries in South Asia, Chowkidar. Among her books are The Last King in India, published by Hurst, and Lucknow 1857. Her partner for many years was Lt. General Stanley Menezes of the Indian Army (1942–1980).

She was appointed Member of the Order of the British Empire (MBE) in the 2015 New Year Honours for services to the British Association for Cemeteries in South Asia and to British Indian studies.

== Selected bibliography ==
- A Very Ingenious Man: Claude Martin in Early Colonial India (Oxford University Press, 1999) ISBN 9780195650990
- Engaging Scoundrels: True Tales of Old Lucknow (Oxford University Press, 2000) ISBN 9780195649536
- A Man of the Enlightenment in Eighteenth-century India: The Letters of Claude Martin, 1766-1800 (New Delhi: Permanent Black, 2003)
- (editor), Lucknow: then and now, with photographs by Ravi Kapoor (Mumbai: Marg, 2003) ISBN 9788185026619
- The Last King in India: Wajid Ali Shah (London, Hurst & Co., 2014) ISBN 9781849044080
- Lucknow, 1857 (HarperCollins India, 2022)

== See also ==
- List of people from Lucknow
