= Muzaffar Ahmad Lari =

Urdu poet, writer and critic

Muzaffar Ahmad Lari writer, Urdu Literature

Personal details
- Born: 3 February 1940 Bhatni Bazar, Deoria district Uttar Pradesh
- Died: 2023 (aged 82–83)
- Profession: Urdu Poet

Muzaffar Ahmad Lari (born 3 February 1940 – 2023) was one of the early prose poetry writers in Urdu literature. His work was published in books entitled: Main and Tu (1965) and Dard-i tanhāʻī (1966). His prose poetry entitled Dard-e-Tanhai (The pain of solitude) from the aforementioned book was examined by others. Aley Ahmad Suroor, a famous critic in Urdu literature, who concluded that Dard-e-Tanhai, an attempt in prose poetry, indeed had a poetic expression with genuine feeling of the writer (1967). Recognition of Lari's work in the early 1960s, along with others, possibly formed a basis in the progress of the prose poetry genre in Urdu literature.

== Early life and education ==
Muzaffar Lari was born in Bhatni Bazar, Deoria district on 3 February (1940), and completed education (M.A. degree, 1962) in Lucknow where he resided due to his family business.

== Literary works ==
- Lari, Muzaffar Ahmad (1965). Main aur tū (in Urdu). Ġālib Akaid́.
- Lari, Muzaffar Ahmad (1966). Dard-i tanhāʻī (in Urdu). Āl Inḍiyā Mīr Akeḍamī.
- Lari, Muzaffar Ahmad (1966). Mut̤alaʻah-yi Mas̲navī Gulzār-i Nasīm (in Urdu). Āl Inḍiyā mīr akeḍamī.

== Death ==
He died in Lucknow in 2023.

== See also ==
- List of people from Lucknow
- List of Urdu poets
- List of Urdu authors
