= Prashant Pathak =

Canadian investor and businessman (born 1972)

- Born: 1972 (age 53–54); Uttar Pradesh, India
- Citizenship: Canadian
- Education: Indian Institute of Technology, Kanpur; INSEAD
- Occupations: Businessman and investor

Prashant Shanker Pathak (born 1972) is a Canadian investor and businessman who lives in Toronto. He is the CEO of Ekagrata Inc., a private investment and diversified holding company with assets in food, agriculture, infrastructure, food-security, specialty manufacturing of hardware technologies, and digital commerce.

== Education ==
Prashant Pathak studied at St. Francis' College, Lucknow before he completed a BTech degree in electrical engineering from The Indian Institute of Technology (IIT) and an MBA from INSEAD with distinction. He also completed a diploma in fuzzy logic from IIT Kanpur.

== Career ==
Pathak joined and was elected as a partner at McKinsey & Company, where he was leader of the North American Telecom Practice, the Financial Services Practices and also a leader of the Canadian Strategy & Corporate Finance Practice.

After this he became the managing partner of ReichmannHauer Capital Partners, an investing and private equity firm based in Toronto focused on business building. He along with Philip Reichmann and Frank Hauer launched the business in 2006. His partners were part of the leadership that built the original Olympia & York commercial real estate empire, which developed landmark properties such as Toronto's First Canadian Place and London's Canary Wharf. He led the successful investments and exit in several businesses including Minacs, a business he helped create through the combination of Minacs with TransWorks an Indian BPO company and Black Photo Corporation that has over 116 premium stores across Canada, the company was purchased from Fujifilm in 2007 and sold to Telus corp. in 2010.

He went on to lead the strategic process that led to the creation and listing on NYSE of PARTS iD Inc.(NYSE: ID), formed following the business combination of Legacy Acquisition Corp.(NYSE:LGC) and Onyx Enterprise Int'l Corp.

== Public causes and philanthropy ==
Pathak is engaged with several community and public causes. He helps run a social venture capital fund initiative, Project Beyshick, that nurtures prosperity and financial independence amongst First Nations communities and individuals by encouraging and mentoring entrepreneurial efforts. The project was co-founded by Toronto-based entrepreneur & philanthropist Aditya Jha, Ontario Regional Chief Stan Beardy, and his mentee Ashutosh Jha. In past, he was also involved with UNICEF Canada's $3-million HIV/AIDS program campaign. He is an active supporter in building export and international linkages of Canadian companies and has been involved in multiple delegations and efforts of the Canadian provincial and federal governments in building bridges with Asia, and in particular India, and, in China where he has recently been involved in the food and agricultural sector. He has commented on Canada's poor relations with India as a result of short term thinking by leadership in Canada. Pathak has been a mentor to the accelerator and incubation program at Singularity University Labs (SU Labs). In 2017 he joined the board of directors of the University of Guelph and retired from the board in June 2023. He has also served on the Board of MaRS Discovery District one of North America's largest urban innovation hubs and served on the board of the Fields Institute a leading international centre for research in mathematical sciences. He has commented on the critical relevance of energy and associated infrastructure in Canada and globally as a choke point for adoption of AI and the related innovations it spawns.

== Philosophy ==
At the PBD Canada 2011, Pathak was a speaker at the interactive panel discussion on engaging "Global Indians". He suggested that, to understand the global Indians, one should study (1.) monarch butterfly (multi-generation round trip between South and North America), (2.) blue wildebeest (survival of blue wildebeest over the black wildebeest that nearly were extinct), and the (3.) bees (how they are essential for existence of human life by being the pollination agent for plants). He described this approach as the "Three-B" approach to understanding how to engage the "Global Indians".

== Appointments and awards ==
Pathak has been an appointee of the Government of Canada to the BDC board and served for approximately a decade. BDC is crown corporation financial institution wholly owned by the Government of Canada. He is an executive in residence with the Asia Pacific Foundation of Canada, created by an Act of Parliament in 1984, APFC is an independent, not-for-profit think-tank on Canada's relations with Asia. He was previously on the board of the North York General Hospital, a leading multi-site regional teaching hospital servicing people in north central Toronto and southern York Region. He was named as one of "Canada's Top 40 Under 40" in 2009 by Caldwell Partners. In 2009, Pathak was named to Rediff India Abroad's "Power List". He was honoured by the Indo Canada Chamber of Commerce in 2015 for his business achievements and strengthening bilateral ties between Canada and India.

== See also ==
- List of people from Lucknow
- Indian Institute of Technology Kanpur
