= Runa Banerjee =

Indian social worker

- Born: 1950 (age 75–76); Lucknow, Uttar Pradesh, India
- Occupation: Social worker
- Known for: Revival of Chikankari
- Awards: Padma Shri

Runa Banerjee is an Indian social worker and the co-founder of the Self Employed Women's Association (SEWA), Lucknow, a non governmental organization promoting the interests of the poor working women of the Indian state of Uttar Pradesh, where she serves as the General Secretary and the Chief executive officer.

She was one among the PeaceWomen Across the Globe who were collectively nominated for the Nobel Peace Prize in 2005, which was eventually won by Mohamed ElBaradei. The Government of India awarded her the fourth highest civilian honour of the Padma Shri, in 2007, for her contributions to Indian society.

== Early life & Work ==
Runa Banerjee was born in 1950 in a Hindu family, at Model House area in Lucknow, the capital city of the Indian state of Uttar Pradesh. She pursued a Master of Arts in History at the University of Lucknow. She is reported to have been active in social service during her early years and was involved in educating the women and children of the locality. In 1979, she organized a health camp for the poor with the participation of locally known physicians such as Devika Nag. A UNICEF report published that year prompted her to train her focus on artisans of Chikankari, a traditional form of embroidery originated in Lucknow. The report revealed that the artisans were being exploited by middlemen and were living in poverty. Banerjee, along with her friend, Sehba Hussain, started a primary school for the children of the artisans, charging them a nominal fee of ₹1; the school which was a single teacher one in the beginning would later develop into SEWA Montessori School. In 1984, she started a mission, Earn While You Learn, with a membership strength of 31, and the organization was formally registered the same year as the Lucknow chapter of Self Employed Women's Association (SEWA). The organization provided a platform for chikankari artisans to teach the craft while working and the membership, over the years, grew to over 7500. Around 8000 women have reportedly been trained by the organization and their efforts is known to have assisted in the revival of then declining craft of Chikankari. Under the aegis of the organization, she organised several exhibitions in India and abroad, the first such exhibition was held at Islamic Centre, New Delhi, followed by Silk Road Campaign in Washington, Macef International Home Show of 2003 in Milan, Brides of the Orient Show in Melbourne and other exhibitions in London and Barcelona. The organization is a part of the Ambedkar Hastashilp Vikas Yojana (AHVY) of the Ministry of Textiles, Government of India.

Banerjee's efforts were also reported in the rehabilitation of the victims of the 2002 Gujarat riots. She, along with Hussain, toured Gujarat in the wake of the riots and helped the victimized women to take up Chikankari for a living and provided them with required training. These efforts earned her a nomination, along with her colleagues at the PeaceWomen Across the Globe, for the Nobel Peace Prize for the year 2005. Two years later, the Government of India awarded her the fourth highest civilian honor of the Padma Shri in 2007.

== See also ==
- Sehba Hussain
- PeaceWomen Across the Globe
- Self Employed Women's Association
- Chikankari
