= Raja Lal Madho Singh =

Raja Lal Madho Singh Bahadur
- Raja of Amethi
- Portrait of Raja Lal Madho Singh Bahadur of Amethi.

29th Ruler of Amethi
- Reign: 1842–1891
- Predecessor: Raja Bisheshwar Singh
- Successor: Raja Bhagwan Baksh Singh

Lal of Gangoli
- Reign: 1830–1842
- Predecessor: Lal Arjun Singh
- Successor: Gangoli Estate merged into Amethi Estate
- Born: 29 November 1823
- Died: 24 August 1891 (aged 67)
- Issue: Lal Lachhman Singh
- House: Bandhalgoti
- Dynasty: Kachhwaha
- Father: Lal Arjun Singh
- Religion: Hinduism

H.H. Maharaja Ishwari Narayan Singh of Kashi (left) and Raja Lal Madho Singh Bahadur of Amethi (right) during the 1869 Anandbagh debate on murtipuja between Dayanand Sarasvati and Kashi pandits.

Raja Lal Madho Singh Bahadur (29 November 1823 – 24 August 1891) was a prominent leader of the Indian Rebellion of 1857, a participant in the Siege of Lucknow, and the ruler of Amethi estate (taluqdari) in the Oudh region of present-day Uttar Pradesh, India.

== Early life and succession ==
Raja Lal Madho Singh hailed from the Bandhalgoti clan of Rajputs. He was the son of Lal Arjun Singh, who independently held the collateral Gangoli estate. Following the death of his cousin, Raja Bisheshar Singh, who died without heirs in 1842, the succession passed to Madho Singh, who subsequently united the Gangoli estate with the Amethi taluqa, making Ramnagar its capital.

Following the death of his only son, Lal Lachhman Singh, Madho Singh passed away in August 1891 and was succeeded by an adopted heir, Raja Bhagwan Baksh Singh, a relative of the late ruler.

== Reign ==
His early reign was marked by territorial disputes; in 1845, due to his efforts to expand his estate, regional tensions escalated into direct hostilities with Maharaja Man Singh, the nazim of Sultanpur. Maharaja Man Singh was prepared to make his power felt throughout his district, while the ambitious young chief was equally determined to resort to arms to prevent official interference; consequently, a grand battle was fought in the year 1845 between Raja Lal Madho Singh and Maharaja Man Singh. The hostilities concluded indecisively, resulting in a settlement where the lease of the pargana was granted to Madho Singh with the exception of a few directly managed estates.

In 1846, after the Shahgarh estate came under Raja Lal Madho Singh’s control through a lease from Maharaja Mán Singh, the local proprietor Balwant Singh tried to resist. To silence this opposition, the Raja captured Balwant Singh and kept him imprisoned in iron chains. During his tour, British Resident General Sleeman documented that the Raja of Amethi had seized the valuable Shahgarh estate (worth twenty thousand rupees a year) while keeping its rightful proprietor locked away.

Around 1830, under Raja Bisheshwar Singh of Amethi, Lal Arjun Singh (father of Raja Lal Madho Singh) was killed by Prag Prasad, one of the sons of Jai Chand Singh, while attempting to encroach upon their property. Following the killing, Prag Prasad and his brothers fled their homes, driven not by the threat of judicial prosecution, but by the local Nazim's allegiance to the Gangoli chief. They returned the following year after a new Nazim took charge and allowed them to regain possession of their estate. Jai Chand Singh, who was the brother of Raja Har Chand Singh, the then Raja of Amethi, had been granted the Kannu and Kasrawan estates, comprising approximately 81 villages, in 1798. This rivalry escalated when the estate owners rebelled against the Raja in 1846; although they were defeated in 1849, they continued raiding Amethi for years. Armed clashes peaked in 1853 when another son of Jai Chand, Bikramajit Singh, was killed in an encounter with Madho Singh. Following the British annexation, the estate could not be restored as it was already firmly in the Raja's possession, and a later civil suit and claim by Sripal Singh, head of the Kannu branch, ultimately failed due to a lack of financial support.

== Role in the 1857 rebellion ==
Following the British annexation of Awadh and the exile of Padshah-e-Awadh Wajid Ali Shah, the First Summary Settlement of 1856 (or the 1264 Fasli settlement) heavily impacted the holdings of local landholders. Lal Madho Singh suffered a severe reduction of his ancestral estate in the Amethi pargana, which plummeted from 807 villages to just 302 settled with him. Despite this grievance, a strict code of honor initially dictated his behavior; during the initial outbreak, he refused to immediately rebel and instead joined neighboring talukdars in actively protecting fleeing European refugees from Sultanpur and their families, providing them with shelter and safe passage. However, once the mutinies succeeded across all regional stations and British administrative authority collapsed completely, Lal Madho Singh mobilized his formidable forces to join the popular uprising. By early September, he was actively preparing to join the rebels, and by late October, it was documented by local accounts that he was present in Lucknow with a force of 2,500 men.

He was formally appointed as the chief of the Begum Hazrat Mahal's forces at the strategic Banni and Alambagh sectors, where he directed major operations against European troops stationed between Dilkusha and the Baillie Guard. He was noted as one of the chief talukdars who was personally fighting on the ground in Lucknow. During the campaigns in late 1857, he personally marched to Bani Banthara with 2,000 men and four artillery pieces to oppose an advancing British company from Kanpur, suffering 200 casualties and losing two guns in the fight. Following this, he urgently warned the Begum Hazrat Mahal that the British would reach Alambagh unless their advance was completely stopped. He subsequently played a vital role in the entrenchment surrounding Alambagh, stationing his contingent of 1,600 men and 4 guns at the Fateh Ali pond where he operated alongside Rajah Rambuksh of Pokra, who deployed 700 men, 1 gun, and 500 sowars of the 15th cavalry regiment.

On 1 November 1857, during his final campaign in Lucknow, Raja Lal Madho Singh of Amethi fought the British alongside his soldiers and the followers of Baqar Miyan, who commanded the irregular infantry and rebel sepoys, numbering around 1,000 cavalry and infantry. A fierce battle ensued, with heavy cannon and gunfire, followed by hand-to-hand fighting with bayonets and swords. The historical account describes that the entire battlefield was turned red by Lal Madho Singh and his companions, who made the blood and water alike, and those killed by him could not rise up again. His Naib (deputy commander) was also killed in the battle.

His subsequent military operations demonstrated a large logistical capacity across multiple theaters. By January 1858, he heavily reinforced the rebel capital of Lucknow by deploying a personal contingent of 3,000 men and 4 guns to join the mass insurgent concentration. Alongside these deployments, he actively confronted advancing columns by fighting the Gurkhas at Sultanpur. Within his own territories, he turned his estates into heavily armed strongholds. At the Sultanpur assembly, he made strenuous efforts to maintain a massive field army consisting of 6,700 regular sepoys, 8,900 local levies, 1,500 cavalry, and 11 guns to confront advancing British columns. His primary headquarters at Ramnagar (the Fort of Amethi) was an imposing mud fortress encircled by a deep moat, ditches, and a barrier of dense jungle, garrisoned by 10,000 troops, 400 cavalry, and 25 guns. He further secured his perimeter by maintaining a strategic outpost at Jagdishpur with 2,000 men and 2 guns.

In August 1858, as British columns pushed into Sultanpur, Lal Madho Singh issued a strategic call to all the talukdars of Baiswada to unite and oppose the British forces. Sultanpur fell to the British on August 13, 1858. Following this, by the 16th of August 1858, Rana Beni Madho joined the Raja of Amethi with a force consisting of 13,000 men and 8 guns to resist the British column. Remaining defiant despite the fall of Sultanpur, he refused to come to terms. In November 1858, British Commander-in-Chief of India, Lord Clyde personally laid siege to the Fort of Amethi and demanded an unconditional surrender. Lord Clyde had arrived at the Sai from Pratapgarh on the 4th of November, and by the 9th, the main army reached within three miles of the Fort of Amethi, while Sir Hope Grant and Brigadier Wetherall invested the north and south faces of the fort. As Sir Hope Grant crossed the plain and approached for a reconnaissance, two guns from the fort opened fire on his escort at a distance of 500 yards, causing them to retreat precipitously. Under intense pressure, Lal Madho Singh entered the British camp on 10 November 1858 to offer his personal submission, claiming he could not guarantee the behavior of his fiercely rebellious garrison.

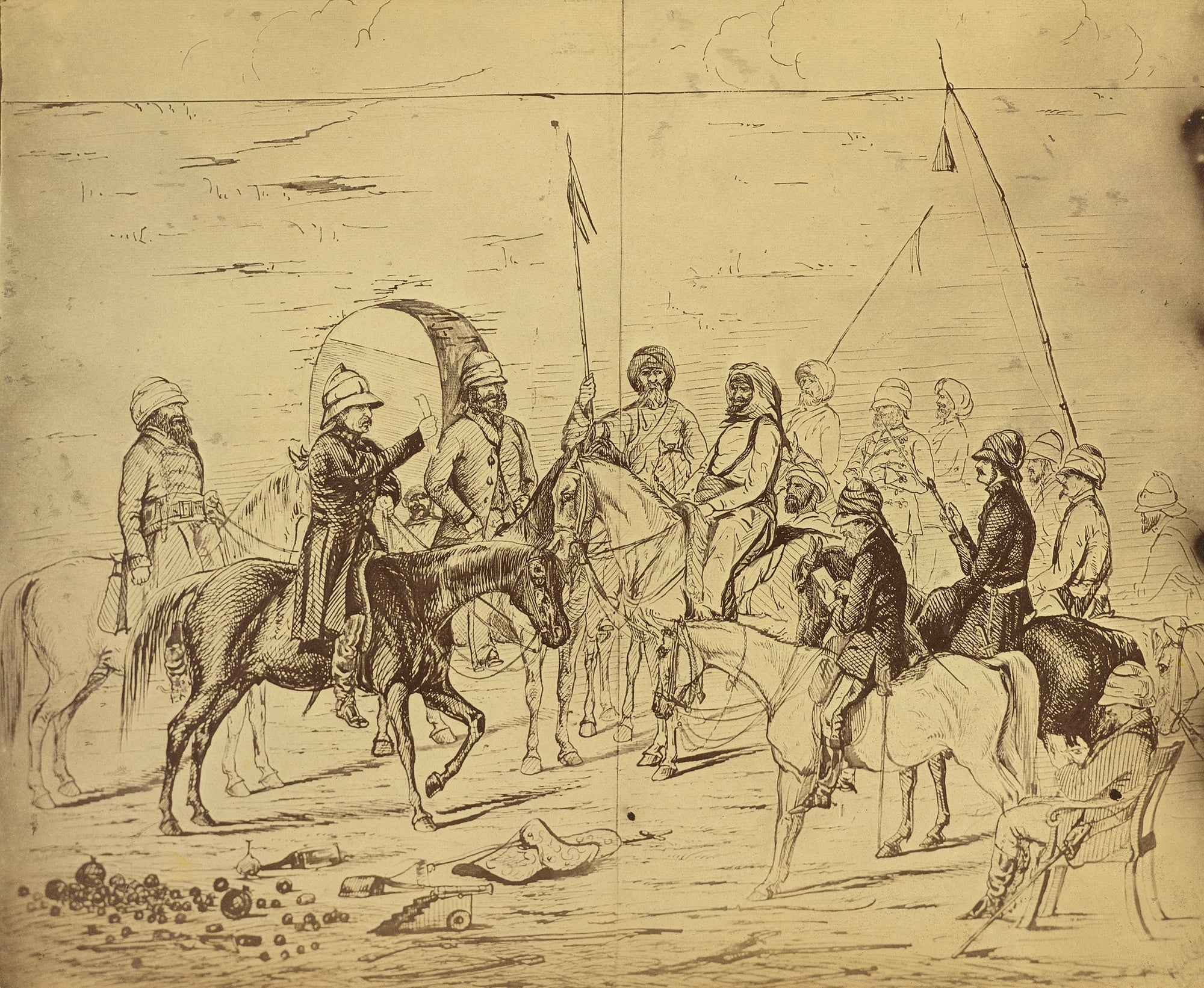
A sketch by Henry Hope Crealock depicting the Siege of the Fort of Amethi during the Byswarra Campaign in November 1858.

This surrender, however, acted as a successful diversionary ruse. While the British accepted his compliance, his entire 10,000 man garrison used the cover of darkness and the dense jungle to smoothly evacuate the fort with their artillery, successfully escaping the British blockade to join the active resistance of Rana Beni Madho at Shankarpur. Some historical analysis, drawing on Charles Ball's account, suggests this surrender was a well-planned ploy by the rebels to secure the Raja's safety while gaining time for the garrison to escape through the jungles.

Lord Clyde was deeply disappointed by this outcome. Although the Raja had complied with the terms of his personal surrender, the fort had been vacated by its occupants, among whom were dangerous sepoys, including some who were guilty sepoys, whom the British had been particularly eager to capture. The Commander-in-Chief of India had intended to prevent their escape, as he feared that these forces would successfully carry away their artillery and utilize the cover of the dense jungle to evade British capture, thereby prolonging the conflict. The Fort of Amethi was subsequently taken and destroyed by British forces.

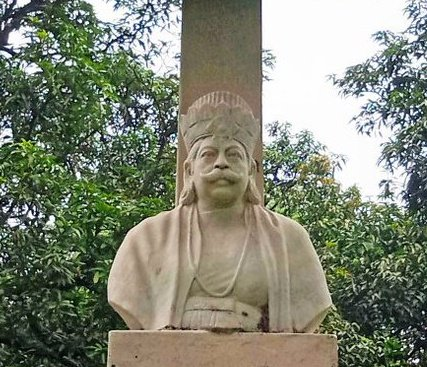
Statue of Raja Lal Madho Singh at Amethi

Following the ultimate suppression of the revolt of 1857 and the pacification of Oudh, Lal Madho Singh's initial actions in protecting European refugees were officially recognized by the British administration. He was recorded as one of the nine principal taluqdars of the province who had protected and saved European lives at the outbreak of the conflict. Consequently, he was granted a private audience by the Governor-General of India, Lord Canning, during his first Durbar, where he was formally introduced and received honors.

== Cultural achievements ==
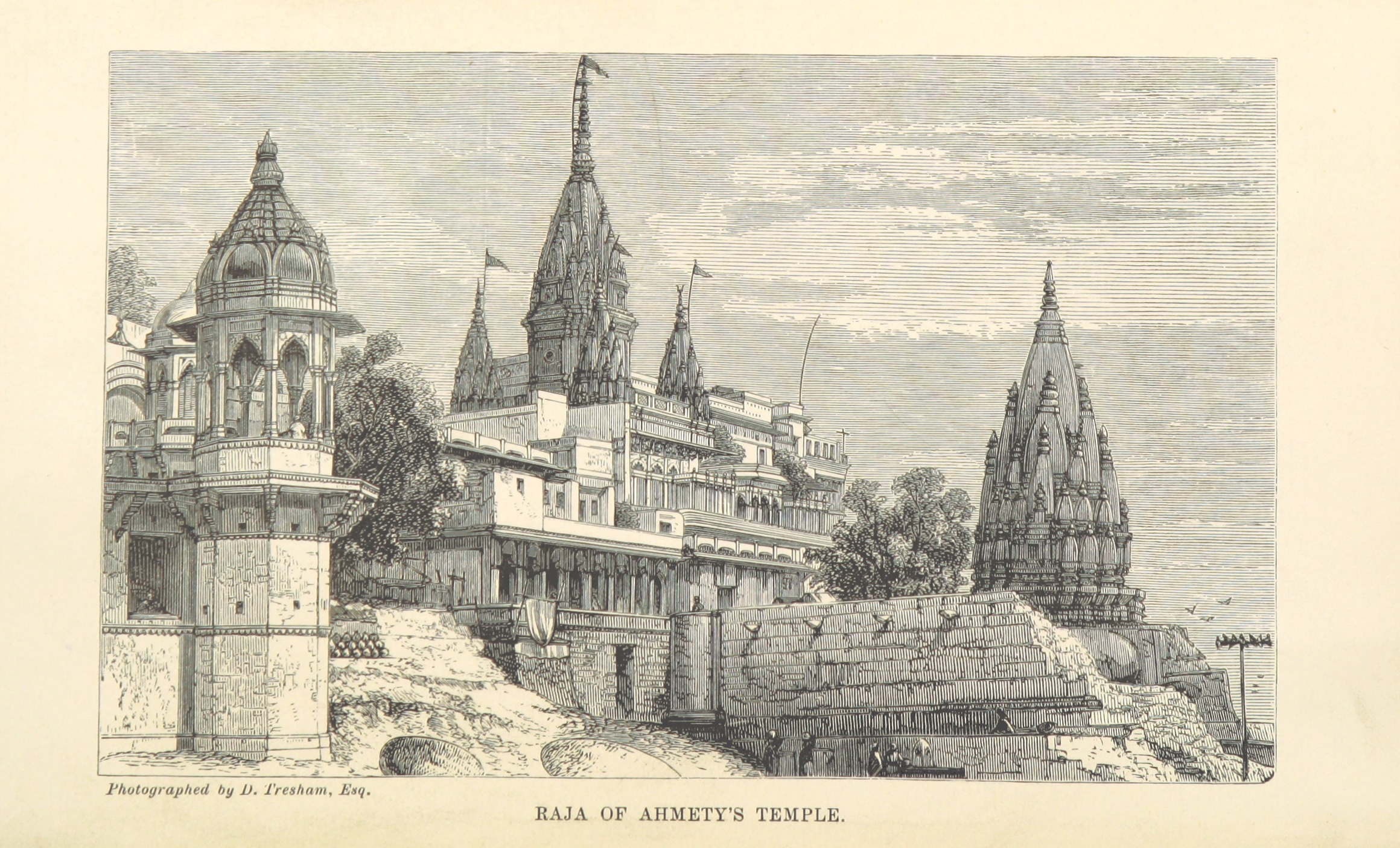
Amethi Temple, constructed by Raja Lal Madho Singh at Manikarnika Ghat, Varanasi

During his reign, Raja Lal Madho Singh (r. 1842–1891) authorized the construction of the Amethi Temple, situated overlooking the Manikarnika Ghat in Varanasi. Dedicated to the Hindu goddess Balatripurasundari, the structure was initially completed in 1842, coinciding with the Raja's accession to the throne. Following an accidental fire that destroyed the original structure shortly after its completion, the temple was rebuilt in 1854. The reconstruction cost an estimated 100,000 rupees (one lakh) at that time, establishing its current architectural form.

By choosing this location, the Raja, who claimed descent from the prestigious Kachhwaha Rajput dynasty, sought to emulate the traditional building practices of the Kachhwahas to establish his own status and legitimacy.

A person standing near the ornate stone arches of the Amethi Temple in Benares, photographed by Samuel Bourne, c. 1870.

Raja Lal Madho Singh expanded the estate's commercial infrastructure by founding the market settlement of Gauriganj in 1845. Established on vacant land across the older villages of Katra-Lalganj and Madhopur, the settlement grew into a prominent railway trading hub and evolved into the modern town of Gauriganj, which now serves as the administrative headquarters of the Amethi district.

Raja Lal Madho Singh was also a patron of arts and literature. He was an active poet who composed verses under the pen name Kshitipal.

== See also ==
- Siege of Lucknow
- Babu Bhoop Singh
