= Amethi Temple =

The Amethi Temple (also Amethy Temple and Amethi Shiva Durga Temple) is a 19th-century Hindu temple located above Manikarnika Ghat on the banks of the Ganges in Varanasi, Uttar Pradesh, India. It is dedicated to the goddess Bala Tripurasundari, and is locally known as the Amethi Temple, named after its royal patron, Raja Lal Madho Singh of Amethi, who ruled from 1842 to 1891. The temple is also been noted for its architectural importance. It is also called Amethi Shiva-Durga Temple.

== History ==
The temple was first constructed in 1842, the same year Raja Lal Madho Singh became the ruler of Amethi, then a township in Sultanpur district in the Awadh province. Shortly after its completion, the temple was destroyed by fire. It was reconstructed in 1854, at a cost of one lakh rupees, which made it one of the most expensive religious projects undertaken by Raja Madho Singh.

== See also ==
- Kashi Vishwanath Temple
- List of Hindu temples in Varanasi
- Raja Lal Madho Singh
