= Gopal Khanna =

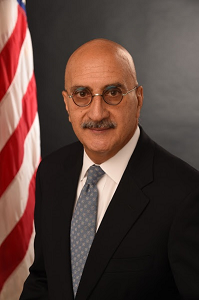
- Gopal Khanna

5th Director of The Agency for Healthcare Research and Quality
- In office May 9, 2017 – January 11, 2021
- President: Donald Trump
- Preceded by: Dr. Andrew Bindman
- Succeeded by: Dr. Robert Otto Valdez

1st Chief Information Officer for the State of Minnesota
- In office 15 August 2005 – 15 December 2010
- Governor: Tim Pawlenty
- Succeeded by: Carolyn Parnell

CFO and CIO for the United States Peace Corps
- In office June 28, 2002 – May 8, 2005

Personal details
- Born: Gopal Khanna Bikaner, India
- Party: Republican
- Spouse: Anjali Khanna
- Children: Rohini Khanna; Rohun Khanna
- Education: St. Francis' College, Lucknow, India (HS); Christ Church College, Kanpur, India (BA) University of Maine, USA (MBA)

Gopal Khanna was the 5th director of the Agency for Healthcare Research and Quality from May 9, 2017, to January 11, 2021. Previously, he was appointed as Minnesota's first Chief Information Officer (CIO) by Governor Tim Pawlenty on August 15, 2005, and reappointed on January 2, 2007. Before his departure, Khanna served as the Lead Co-chair of the 19 members Minnesota Commission on Service Innovation. Khanna served as a member of the Health Information Technology Policy & Standards Committees' Enrollment Workgroup, chaired by President Obama's Chief Technology Officer at The White House, which was tasked to develop a set of standards to facilitate enrollment in federal and state health and human services programs.

Before assuming his position in the Governor's Cabinet, Khanna served in the administration of President George W. Bush from June 2002 to August 2005, where he held several senior policy positions including CIO and CFO of the Peace Corps and CFO of the EOP/Office of Administration.

== Industry Leadership ==
As the President of the National Association of State CIOs (NASCIO), Khanna was an advocate for enhanced cyber security, and green IT initiatives.

== Minnesota State CIO ==
Governor Tim Pawlenty appointed Gopal Khana as the first Chief Information Officer for the State of Minnesota in August 2005. In this role, Khanna developed technology to streamline government and enhance collaboration with businesses. The move to an outsourced solution shortly before leaving office was questioned by Informationweek. Shortly after his appointment, Khanna was interviewed by Twin Cities Business Magazine and cited many problems he believed were faced by Minnesota's IT infrastructure, including "an aging state government workforce and younger tech-savvy who want faster services." To combat these problems, Khanna instituted the following:

- The Minnesota Information and Telecommunications Technology Systems and Services Master Plan in 2007 which acted as a comprehensive plan for all of Minnesota's information resources; the three pillars of which were consolidating and improving systems, improving efficiency and functionality of common activities, and increasing the security underlying the state's electronic capabilities.
- The IT Funding Strategies for 21st Century report (2008) which sought "to inform policy makers of the need to create IT funding strategies that are needed urgently to facilitate and manage" Minnesota's information priorities. It also advocated for "flexible and creative approaches to funding business and technological change" in order to "supplement traditional funding methods".
- The Enterprise Security Strategic Plan (2009) outlined methods to control and protect Minnesota's information assets, and a five-year vision with 19 strategic objectives that were grouped into three categories: Improved situational awareness; proactive risk management; and robust crisis and security incident management.
- The Minnesota iGov report (2009) updated implementation and best practices outlined to meet the goals outlined in the Master Plan while taking into account the state's fiscal challenges. It had 3 main tenets: citizens have expectations of data and services that are secure, accessible in real time, and locally available; information is one of the state's most important assets; the act of consolidating IT systems is an opportunity to improve fundamental business operations.
- In September 2010, in an effort to deliver technology services as efficiently and cost-effectively as possible, the State of Minnesota's Office of Enterprise Technology signed a groundbreaking enterprise-wide cloud-computing service agreement with Microsoft - being one of the first states to do so.
- Collaboration initiatives, like those outlined in StateTech Magazine in their Dec 09/Jan 10 issue, worked to "conquer storage woes with storage area networks rollouts, state of the art emergency operations centers, and arraignments conducted via video conferencing" and partner with neighbor states to reduce costs while tackling tough hurdles.

The Department of Revenue did not renew its contract for services from the Office of Enterprise Technology. Quality issues were acknowledged during a State House Legislative hearing. In September 2008 Khanna was elected by other state CIOs to be the President of the National Association of State CIOs.

== U.S. Peace Corps ==
Khanna served as Senior Foreign Service (SFS) level policy advisor to the Director of the Peace Corps on agency planning, congressional appropriations, budget strategizing, and directed all information technology. As CIO, provided leadership and oversight for the agency's worldwide IT operations and modernization of systems in support of agency's mission. As CFO, led the implementation of a new, integrated, highly complex financial management system, with ORACLE at the backend, for the agency's domestic offices and overseas operations in 72 countries, thereby providing a scalable platform to support the organization's growth in the 21st century and fulfilling congressionally mandated financial reporting requirements, including submission to the United States Congress on November 15, 2004, the first set of audited financial statements in agency's 43-year history. ( The Peace Corps Performance and Accountability Report)

== Private Sector Career ==
=== International Technology Consultants, Inc. ===
From 1996 to 2002, Khanna was president and CEO of International Technology Consultants, Inc., a Minneapolis-based IT and Management Consulting firm providing services to Fortune 1000 companies.

=== American Hardware Insurance Group ===
From 1990 to 1996, he was with the American Hardware Insurance Group, a Minneapolis-based property and casualty insurance group, where he held several positions including vice president of operations, vice president of systems, and vice president of information technology and administration.

=== National Council on Compensation Insurance ===
From 1981 to 1990, he was with the National Council on Compensation Insurance in Boca Raton, Florida, where he held several positions including director of operations and director of strategic planning. Prior to that, Khanna lived in New York City where he held positions in marketing, sales management, merchandising, and corporate training and development with the MONY Financial Services Group.

== Civic and community engagement ==
Khanna served former Minnesota Governor Arne Carlson from 1993 to 1994 as his appointee to the Minnesota Academic Excellence Foundation.

In 2007, Khanna travelled with Governor Tim Pawlenty as a member of a Minnesota Trade Delegation to India and visited sites in Delhi, Bangalore, and Mumbai opening trade opportunities between Minnesota and India.

== Early years and Education ==
A citizen of the United States of America, Gopal Khanna was born and raised in India. He hails from a family whose patriarch Rai Saheb Ganesh Prashad settled in Kanpur, India after his retirement from service in the Indian Railways during the British Raj. Gopal Khanna received his early education in a boarding school at St. Francis' College in Lucknow, India. Khanna was a member of school cricket, field hockey, soccer, and debating teams. Gopal Khanna earned his Bachelor of Arts degree with concentration in Economics, Mathematics, and Political Science from Christ Church College, Kanpur, India. He then pursued his higher education at the Graduate School of Business at the University of Maine where he earned his MBA.
