= Raja Bhagwan Baksh Singh =

- Raja of Amethi
- Portrait of Raja Bhagwan Bakhsh Singh of Amethi

30th Ruler of Amethi
- Reign: 1891–1962
- Predecessor: Raja Lal Madho Singh
- Successor: Raja Rananjay Singh
- Born: 1869
- Died: 1962 (aged 92–93)
- Issue: Jungbahadur Singh; Ranveer Singh; Satrunjay Singh; Rananjay Singh
- House: Bandhalgoti
- Dynasty: Kachhwaha
- Father: Sheodarshan Singh
- Religion: Hinduism

Raja Bhagwan Baksh Singh (29 January 1869 – 1962) was the chief of the Bandhalgoti clan of Rajputs and ruler of the Amethi estate (Taluqdari) in the Oudh region of present-day Uttar Pradesh, India.

== Early life and succession ==
Raja Bhagwan Baksh Singh was born on 29 January 1869. He hailed from the Bandhalgoti clan of Rajputs and was the chief of the clan. He was the son of Sheo Darshan Singh, a relative of the late Raja Lal Madho Singh. Following the death of the only son of Raja Lal Madho Singh, Bhagwan Baksh Singh was adopted as his heir and subsequently succeeded to the estate on 24 August 1891.

== Reign ==
During his reign, Raja Bhagwan Baksh Singh undertook several public welfare and infrastructural initiatives within his estate. In 1895, a new female hospital was erected in Sultanpur almost entirely at his expense, which became known as the Amethi Female Hospital.

In 1897, he served as a member representing Sultanpur District on the General Committee of the Indian Famine Charitable Relief Fund, assisting with regional relief distribution. In 1901, he established an Anglo-vernacular school in Ramnagar as a Victoria memorial, which provided middle-standard education and served as the only school in the district outside headquarters teaching English. Additionally, he financed the metalled road connecting Ramnagar to Munshiganj.

Later in his reign, Raja Bhagwan Baksh Singh of Amethi was among the twenty-one premier Taluqdars of the Awadh province invited to attend the Imperial Delhi Durbar in December 1911, which was held to mark the coronation of King George V and Queen Mary as Emperor and Empress of India. He was officially accommodated in Camp 468 within the United Provinces Provincial Camp. He participated in the historic coronation proceedings held during the event.

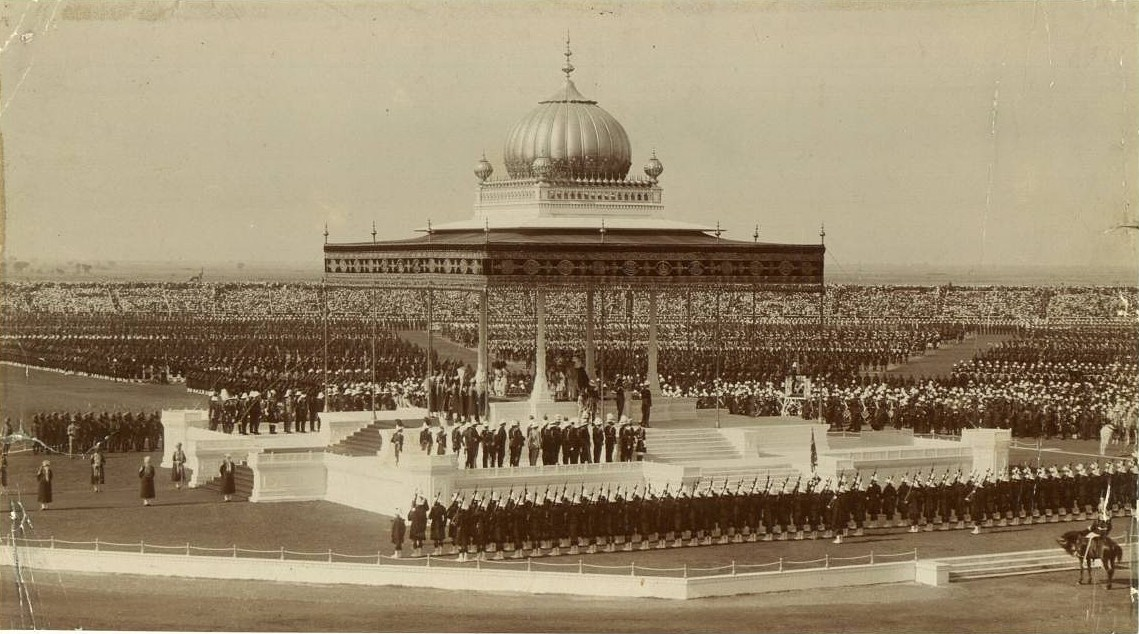
The Imperial Delhi Durbar of December 1911, attended by Raja Bhagwan Baksh Singh among the Taluqdars of Awadh.

On 7 March 1930, the United Provinces government placed the Amethi estate under the Court of Wards, declaring Raja Bhagwan Baksh Singh disqualified from managing his property under Section 8 of the U.P. Court of Wards Act, 1912. He subsequently challenged the declaration in court, arguing that the government's order was illegal and ultra vires. The suit was ultimately dismissed by the Allahabad High Court on 31 March 1937.

== Honours ==

- Kaisar-i-Hind Medal, 1st Class (gold) medal-26 June 1902.
