= Versha Verma =

- वर्षा वर्मा
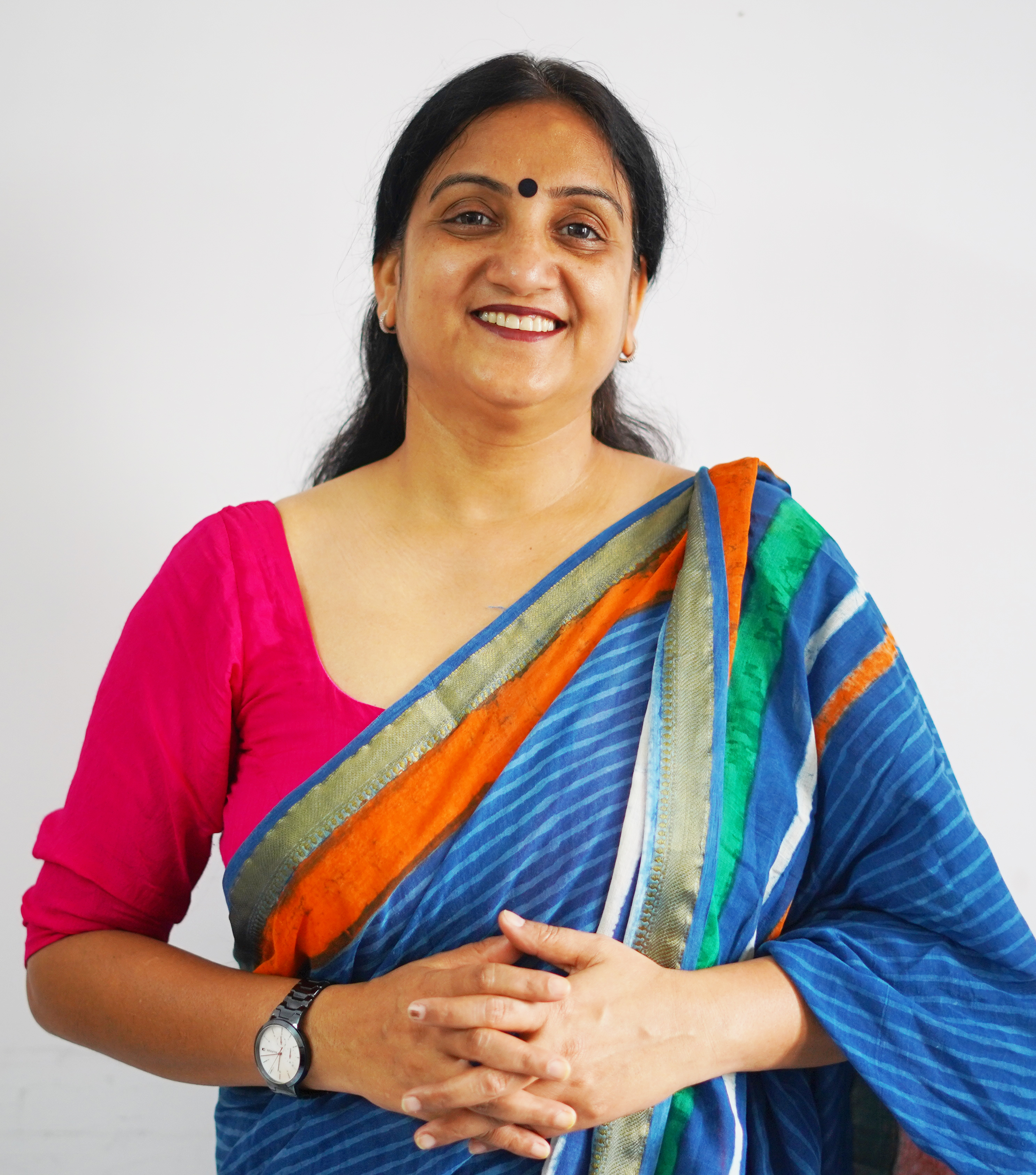
- Versha in 2024
- Born: 20 December 1978 (age 47); Lucknow, Uttar Pradesh, India
- Occupation: Social Worker

Versha Verma (born 20 December 1978) is a Lucknow-based social worker and poet who runs a non-profit called Ek Koshish Aisi Bhi which she started in 2015. Her work came to prominence during the COVID-19 pandemic when she began providing free assistance to families, transporting mortal remains from hospitals to cremation grounds and performing their last rites, all while risking her own life.

== Early life and education ==
Versha was born in Lucknow into a business class family. Her father is a goldsmith, and her mother is a housewife.

Versha completed her education in Lucknow. She did her schooling from Navyug Kanya Mahavidyalaya, graduated in Arts from Avadh Girls' Degree College, Lucknow and completed her post-graduation in English from Kanpur University.

== COVID-19 work ==
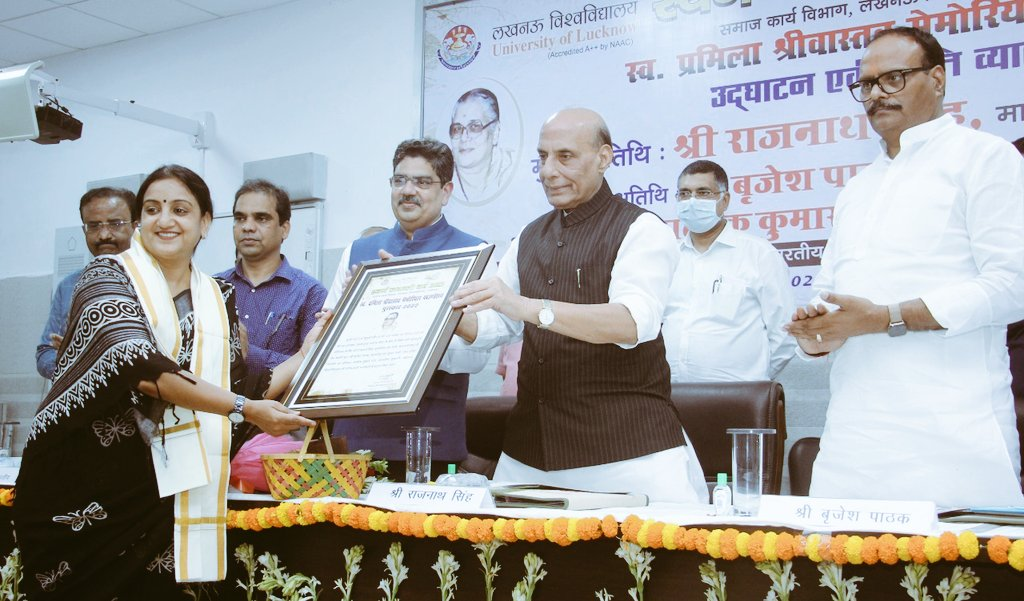
Defence Minister Shri Rajnath Singh felicitating Versha Verma

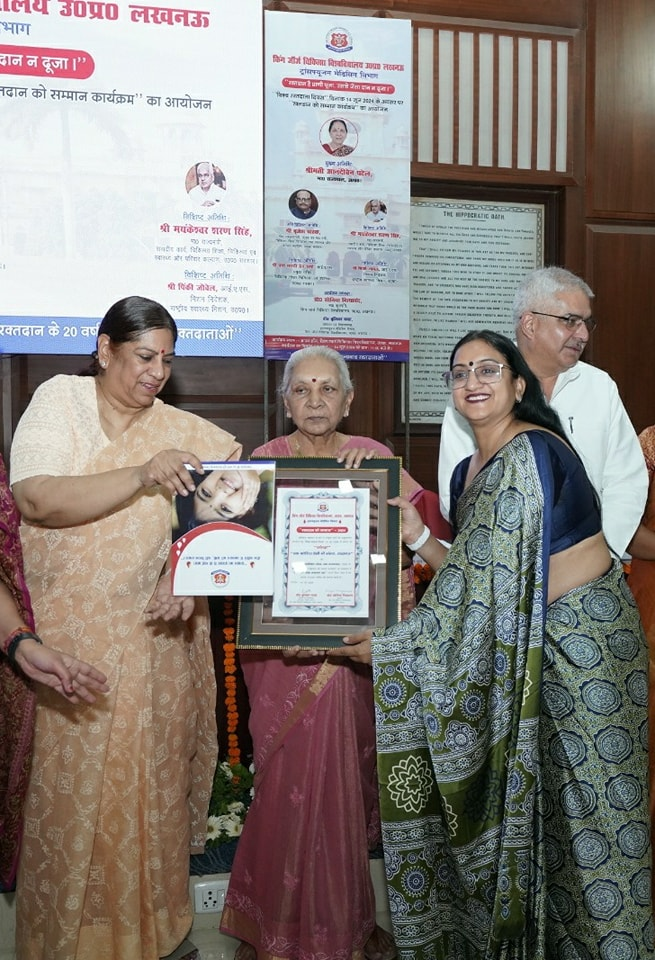
UP Governor Smt. Anandiben Patel felicitating Versha Verma

During the second wave of COVID-19 pandemic, Lucknow, like other cities witnessed huge number of deaths. Versha lost her best friend to COVID-19, and her body kept lying at the hospital's morgue for hours because no transportation was available to carry it to the crematorium. Those who agreed were asking for prohibitive sums of money, which the family couldn’t afford. The incident affected Versha so much that the next day, she rented a van, hired a driver and headed to the same hospital with a placard that read, “Nishulk Shav Vahan" (free vehicle for carrying the dead).

== Social work ==
Versha has been actively involved in various social causes. When she was 14 years old, she used to provide humanitarian aid to the patients at King George Medical University, Lucknow and run errands for them. Now, through her non-profit organisation, she provides free hearse cars and ambulance service to needy families throughout the state of Uttar Pradesh. She helps in the rehabilitation of destitutes, trains young women and girls in self-defence, organises blood donation camps and arranges blood donors, and educates underprivileged children.

She delivers awareness lectures on postnatal care to new mothers at government hospitals and distributes hygiene kits. She provides ration kit to cancer patients at Ram Manohar Lohia Hospital, Lucknow, and distributes health kits to kids at pediatric cancer department of King George Medical University, Lucknow since 2016, Versha has cremated over 9000 bodies.

== Personal life ==
Versha's family consists of her husband, who is an Executive Engineer in Public Works Department, Uttar Pradesh.

== Awards and recognition ==
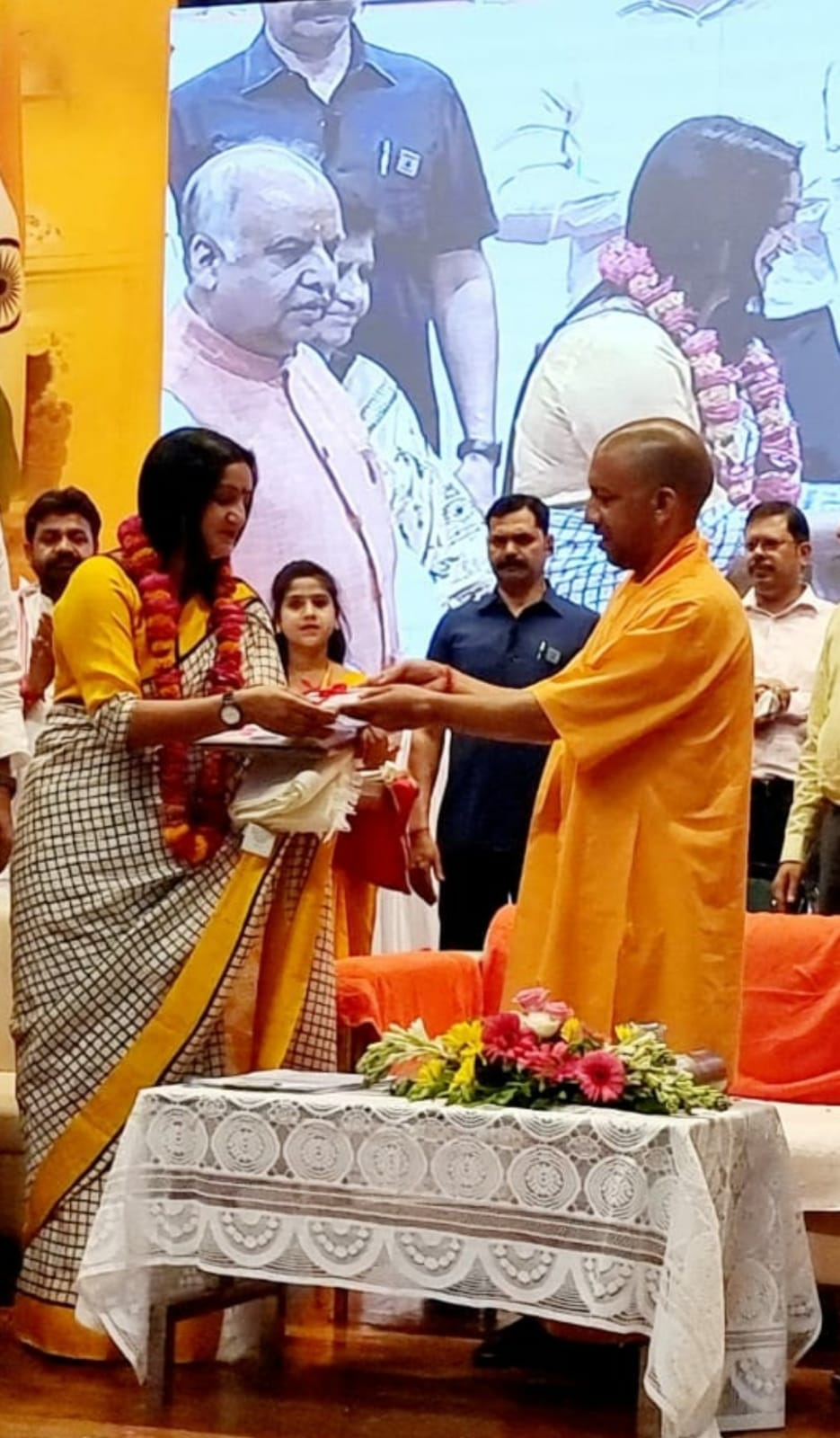
Uttar Pradesh CM Yogi Adityanath felicitating Versha Verma with Lalji Tandon Samajik Seva Purskar

Versha has received numerous accolades from prominent figures, including Hon'ble Raksha Mantri Shri Rajnath Singh, Hon'ble Chief Minister of Uttar Pradesh Shri Yogi Adityanath, former Union Minister Smt. Smriti Irani and former IAS Navneet Sehgal.

ForbesIndia featured Versha for her daring presence and contribution during the COVID-19.

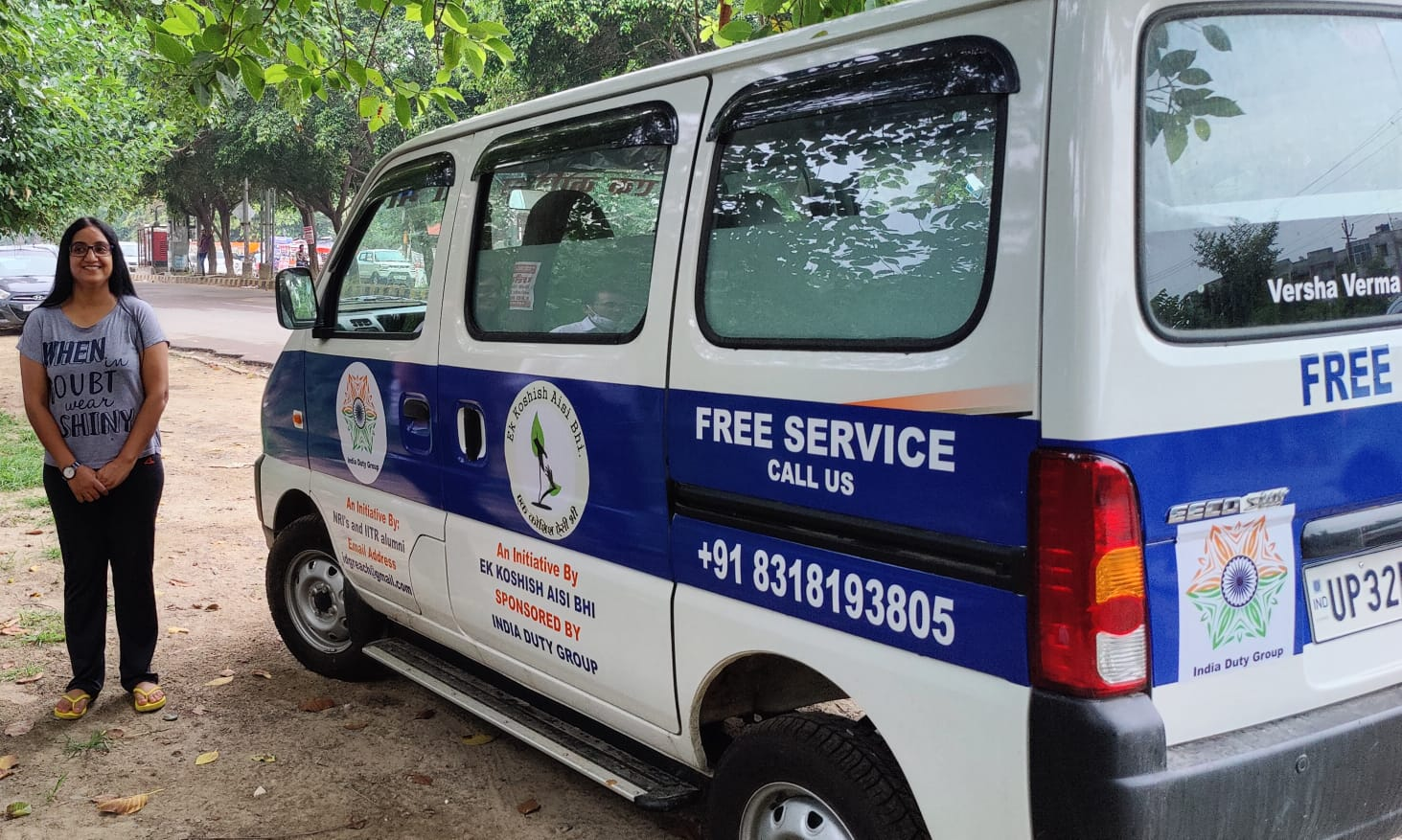
Versha Verma with her ambulance/hearse car

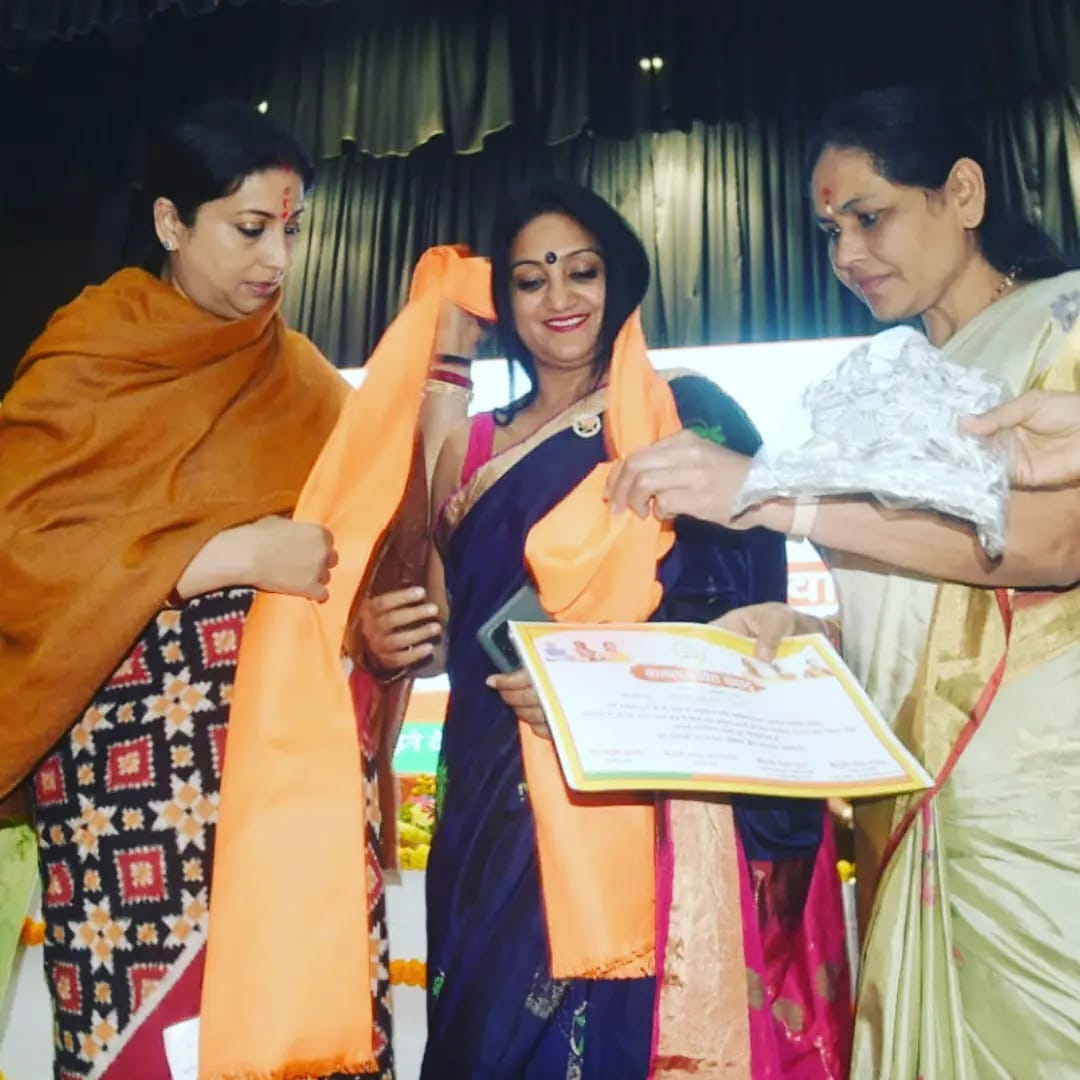
Former Union Minister Smt. Smriti Irani felicitating Versha Verma

Femina India & Mamaearth recognised Versha among Beautiful Indians 2022.

Sony Pictures Networks India highlighted Versha's COVID-19 work in its campaign #GoBeyondKindness.
