= Amaresh Misra =

Indian writer and conspiracy theorist

- Education: University of Allahabad
- Occupations: Writer, politician, scripts at OTT and TV
- Writing career
- Language: Hindi
- Notable work: War of Civilisations: India AD 1857

Amaresh Misra is an Indian writer and a self-professed revolutionary. He was the convener of the Anti Communal Front in Uttar Pradesh state for Indian National Congress for four years, until 2014.

Misra's research on the 1857 uprising drew press attention. The Guardian reported on his 2007 claim that British reprisals following the 1857 rebellion resulted in the killing of ten million people over a ten-year period. This research formed the basis of his two-volume work War of Civilizations: 1857 A.D.

Misra has written as a political columnist for the Economic and Political Weekly and has contributed columns to The Indian Express.

In 2013, Misra led a campaign, the "Rashtriya Apmaan Virodhi Abhiyan," to alter epitaphs on the graves of British colonial-era officers in Lucknow, including an attempt to deface the grave of Major William Hodson at La Martinière College.

During his college years, Misra was a student leader of the Left CPI-ML (Liberation) party in the University of Allahabad. He co-wrote the script for the movie Bullet Raja.

He started the movement to restore India's pride in Freedom Fighters' contributions to its journey to independence.

== Controversies ==
He wanted to rewrite modern Indian history to reflect an Indian perspective instead of the British accounts.

He unsuccessfully contested the 2009 Lok Sabha elections from Lucknow on the ticket of Ulema Council. He joined the Congress party for five years after that. Today, he runs a peasant based Kisan Kranti Dal and Mangal Pandey Sena based in Uttar Pradesh.

== Awards ==
- The Urdu Press Club of India gave Amaresh the Jasarat Award in 2007.
- Aligarh Group with renowned historian Irfan Habib awarded him for historical work in 2022.

== Publications ==
- Lucknow: Fire of Grace: The Story of its Renaissance, Revolution and the Aftermath (Delhi: HarperCollins, 1999) ISBN 978-8172232887
- The Minister's Wife (a novel—Penguin, 2002) ISBN 978-0143028161
- Mangal Pandey: The True Story of an Indian Revolutionary (Delhi: Rupa, 2005)
- War of Civilizations: India AD 1857, Vols 1 and 2 (Delhi: Rupa, 2007)

== See also ==
- List of people from Lucknow
