= Sehba Hussain =

Indian activist

- Born: Lucknow
- Occupation: Activist

Sehba Hussain is an Indian social activist. She is the co-founder and honorary treasurer of Self-Employed Women's Association (SEWA) in Lucknow. and founding board member and executive director of Lucknow-based, BETI (Better Education Through Innovation) Foundation, established in 2000.

== Early life and education ==
Sehba Hussain was born in Lucknow, Uttar Pradesh.

She did her post graduate studies from University of Pennsylvania, Philadelphia, as a Fulbright Scholar, and also did her master's degree in medical and psychiatric social work from University of Delhi.

== Career ==
Sehba Hussain has worked with UNICEF for nearly 17 years, both as an international and national professional, notable among which were her responsibilities as Country Representative Bhutan, chief of Health Section, UNICEF India, and Chief Upper India Office responsible for Bihar and Uttar Pradesh and state representative, U.P.

She co-founded SEWA, Lucknow, along with Runa Banerjee in 1984, which has been involved in organising women engaged in chikankari industry. It was given the 2006 Best Practices Award by UN-HABITAT. In 2000, she became a founding member of BETI Foundation, established in Lucknow and working in the areas of Bahraich, Balrampur, Barabanki, Gonda, Kheri, Lalitpur, Lucknow, Shravasti, Sitapur.

She was a member of the National Advisory Council during the tenure of 2005-2008.

She is also a member of the executive committee of the National Mission for the Sarva Shiksha Abhiyan, for universalization of elementary education in India.
