= Fatehpur =

Fatehpur, Fatepur, or Phattepur may refer to any of a number of places:

== Bangladesh ==
- Fatehpur Union (Hathazari), a union of Hathazari Upazila of Chittagong District

== India ==
- Fatehpur, Bihar, a village
- Fatehpur, Bhopal, a village in Madhya Pradesh
- Fatehpur, Gujarat, a village in Amreli district
- Fatehpur, Rajasthan, a town
  - Battle of Fatehpur (1799), between Jaipur (Rajputs) and Gwalior (Marathas)
- Fatehpur (community development block), an administrative division in Jharkhand
  - Fatehpur, Jamtara, a village in Jharkhand

=== West Bengal ===
- Fatehpur, Birbhum, a census town in Birbhum district
- Fatepur, Falta, a census town in South 24 Parganas district

=== Haryana ===
- Fatehpur, Kaithal, a village in Kaithal district
- Fatehpur, Yamunanagar, a village in Yamuna Nagar district

=== Punjab ===
- Fatehpur, Bhulath, a village
- Fatehpur, Jalandhar, a village
- Fatehpur, Kapurthala, a village in Kapurthala district

=== Uttar Pradesh ===
- Fatehpur district
- Fatehpur, Barabanki, a city
- Fatehpur, Uttar Pradesh, a city in Fatehpur district
- Fatehpur railway station, on the Howrah–Delhi main line in Uttar Pradesh, India
- Fatehpur, Raebareli, a village in Raebareli district

=== Constituencies ===
- Fatehpur Assembly constituency (disambiguation)
- Fatehpur, Himachal Pradesh Assembly constituency, in Himachal Pradesh, India
- Fatehpur (Rajasthan Assembly constituency)
- Fatehpur, Uttar Pradesh (Assembly constituency)
- Fatehpur (Lok Sabha constituency), in Uttar Pradesh, India

== Nepal ==
- Phattepur, Saptari, a village development committee in Saptari District

== Pakistan ==
- Fatehpur, a place in Sindh
  - Battle of Fatehpur (1519), between the Samma and Arghun dynasties
- Fateh Pur, a city in Layyah district of Punjab
- Fatehpur (Kasur), a town and union council in Punjab
- Fatehpur (Gujrat), a village in Punjab
- Fatehpur, Azad Kashmir, a town in Azad Kashmir
- Fatehpur, Swat, a union council in Khyber Pakhtunkhwa

== Other uses ==
- Battle of Fatehpur (disambiguation)
- Fatehpur Sikri, in Agra district, India, a former capital of the Mughal Empire
  - Battle of Fatehpur Sikri (1721), between the Mughals and Jats
- Fatehpuri Mosque, Chandni Chowk, Old Delhi, Delhi, India
