= Sikri =

Sikri may refer to:

== Places ==
- Sikri, Ballabhgarh, village in Ballabhgarh tehsil of Faridabad district in Haryana, India
- Sikri Khurd, village in Ghaziabad district, Uttar Pradesh, India
  - Sikri Mata Temple
- Sikri metro station, Delhi Metro
- Sikri, Phagwara, village in Punjab, India
- Sikri, St. Kabir Nagar, village in Uttar Pradesh, India
- Sikri Vyas, village in Jalaun district, Uttar Pradesh, India
- Fatehgarh Sikri, village in Kapurthala district, Punjab, India
- Fatehpur Sikri, formerly Sikri, town in Agra district, Uttar Pradesh, India
  - Fatehpur Sikri Assembly constituency
  - Fatehpur Sikri Lok Sabha constituency
  - Fatehpur Sikri railway station
  - Battle of Fatehpur Sikri (1721)
  - Jama Mosque, Fatehpur Sikri
  - Panch Mahal, Fatehpur Sikri

== People ==
- Arjan Kumar Sikri (born 1954), judge in the Supreme Court of India
- Sarv Mittra Sikri (1908–1992), 13th Chief Justice of India
- Surekha Sikri (1945–2021), Indian actress

== See also ==
- Fatehpur (disambiguation)
- Sikri stupa, Gandharan Buddhist artwork
