= Chilauli =

Chilauli may refer to:

== Places ==
- Chilauli, Asoha, a village in Unnao district, Uttar Pradesh, India
- Chilauli, Hilauli, a village in Unnao district, Uttar Pradesh, India
- Chilauli, Singhpur, Raebareli (census code 144013), a village in Raebareli district, Uttar Pradesh, India
- Chilauli, Singhpur, Raebareli (census code 144059), a village in Raebareli district, Uttar Pradesh, India
