= Singhpur, Raebareli =

Singhpur
- Village
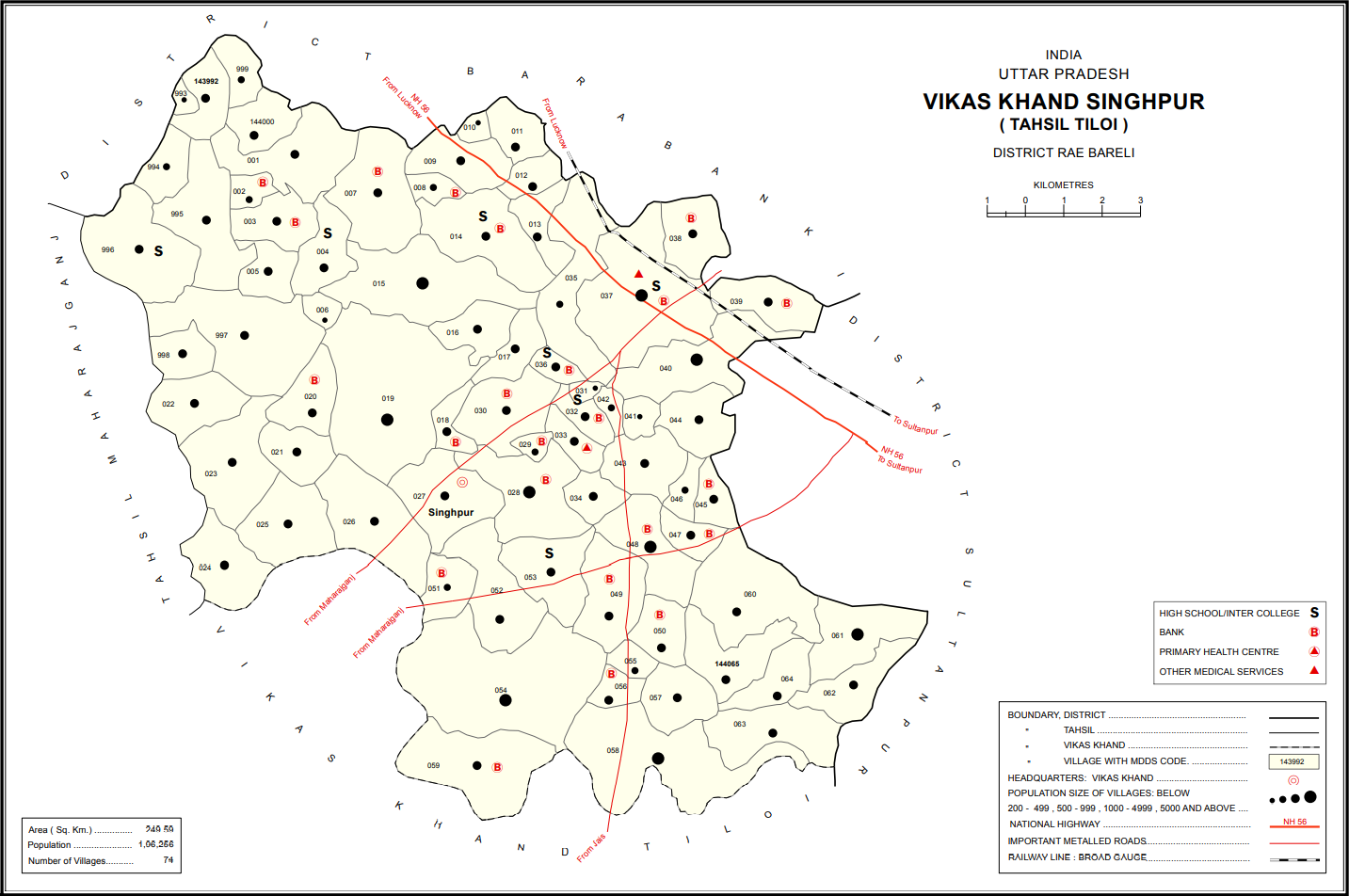
- Map of Singhpur CD block

- Location in Uttar Pradesh, India
- Coordinates: 26.481904°N 81.441914°E
- Country India: India
- State: Uttar Pradesh
- District: Raebareli

Area
  - Total: 6.116 km^{2} (2.361 sq mi)

Population (2011)
  - Total: 2,826
  - Density: 462.1/km^{2} (1,197/sq mi)

Languages
  - Official: Hindi
- Time zone: UTC+5:30 (IST)
- PIN: 229308
- Vehicle registration: UP-35

Singhpur is a village and corresponding community development block in Tiloi tehsil of Rae Bareli district, Uttar Pradesh, India. As of 2011, its population is 2,826, in 549 households. It is located 16 km from Tiloi, the tehsil headquarters, and 20 km from the town of Maharajganj. The main staple foods are wheat and rice.

The 1961 census recorded Singhpur as comprising 11 hamlets, with a total population of 1,179 people (617 male and 562 female), in 303 households and 296 physical houses. The area of the village was given as 998 acres.

The 1981 census recorded Singhpur as having a population of 1,418 people, in 317 households, and having an area of 396.60 hectares.

== Villages ==
Singhpur CD block has the following 74 villages:

Village name	Total land area (hectares)	Population (in 2011)
Kharawa	213.6	2,590
Sighhawapur	25.4	298
Kusumbhi	171.4	961
Tikari	512.3	2,282
Kukaha Rampur	576.8	3,711
Mahiya Senduriya	753.5	4,557
Goyan	160.5	1,050
Nagiya Mou	146.2	805
Hathrohana	197.1	1,612
Lauli	481.5	2,864
Sakatpur	107.8	551
Jaitpur	248.4	2,164
Tedhai	281	1,967
Jagatpur	177.1	1,582
Raja Patti	52.8	457
Mahimanpur	17	3,059
Sultanpur Bahengi	47	550
Naukhera	283.8	1,668
Dubeypur	39.2	399
Anguri	184.3	1,373
Ashrafpur	126	1,037
Chilauli	213.3	2,616
Kotwa	570.3	4,832
Satan Purwa	716.8	7,719
Bhanipur	228.1	1,574
Gadhi Mahabal	127.5	1,575
Ahorwa Bhwani	103.3	1,477
Khara	1,158.2	7,320
Jehta Usarha	276.3	2,923
Kharagpur	217.7	1,512
Perariya	300.4	1,527
Perara	549	3,651
Khekharuwa	350	2,320
Rampur Panwara	387	2,128
Ratwaliya Manjhar	553.9	2,289
Singhpur (block headquarters)	611.6	2,826
Panhauna	890.7	7,075
Patti Bakshi	36.8	522
Bhawanipur	78.6	1,328
Gopalpur	39.7	469
Dhirapur	186.4	1,256
Ramganj	155.4	1,129
Jainagara	222	1,850
Saraiya Salarpur	250.9	914
Dangi Barwaliya	92	1,491
Inhauna	862	13,049
Sarai Madho	259	1,212
Sadhiya	277	2,230
Azadpur	565.2	6,373
Mahmood Sarai	31.6	248
Miyan Ganj	74.9	670
Ahmadabad Pipari	307	2,808
Jijauli	303.6	1,664
Jiyapur	834.6	1,434
Otiya	102.8	1,857
Shekhan Gaon	1,028	2,615
Fatehpur	368.8	5,348
Rajapur	346	3,954
Bhikhipur	246.1	2,900
Godhana	195.4	993
Dandupur	473	2,726
Jugrajpur	374	3,896
Phoola	1,359.7	7,726
Rampur	91.3	543
Hasanpur	121.5	1,162
Konchi	264.3	1,914
Rasta Mau	697.1	7,859
Chilauli	529.3	3,429
Karan Gaon	470.7	3,500
Bahua	433.3	5,645
Mirzagarh	258.5	2,596
Khanapur Chapara	491.3	4,738
Mattepur	244.9	2,682
Usufnagar	293	2,625
