= Battle of Fatehpur =

Battle of Fatehpur may refer to:

- Battle of Fatehpur (1519), a conflict in Sindh between the Samma and Arghun royal houses of Sindh
- Battle of Fatehpur (1799), a conflict between the Kingdom of Amber and the Gwalior State of the Maratha Confederacy

== See also ==
- Fatehpur (disambiguation)
- Battle of Fatehpur Sikri (1721), between the Mughals and Jats
