= Kotwa, Singhpur, Raebareli =

Village in India

Kotwa
- Village
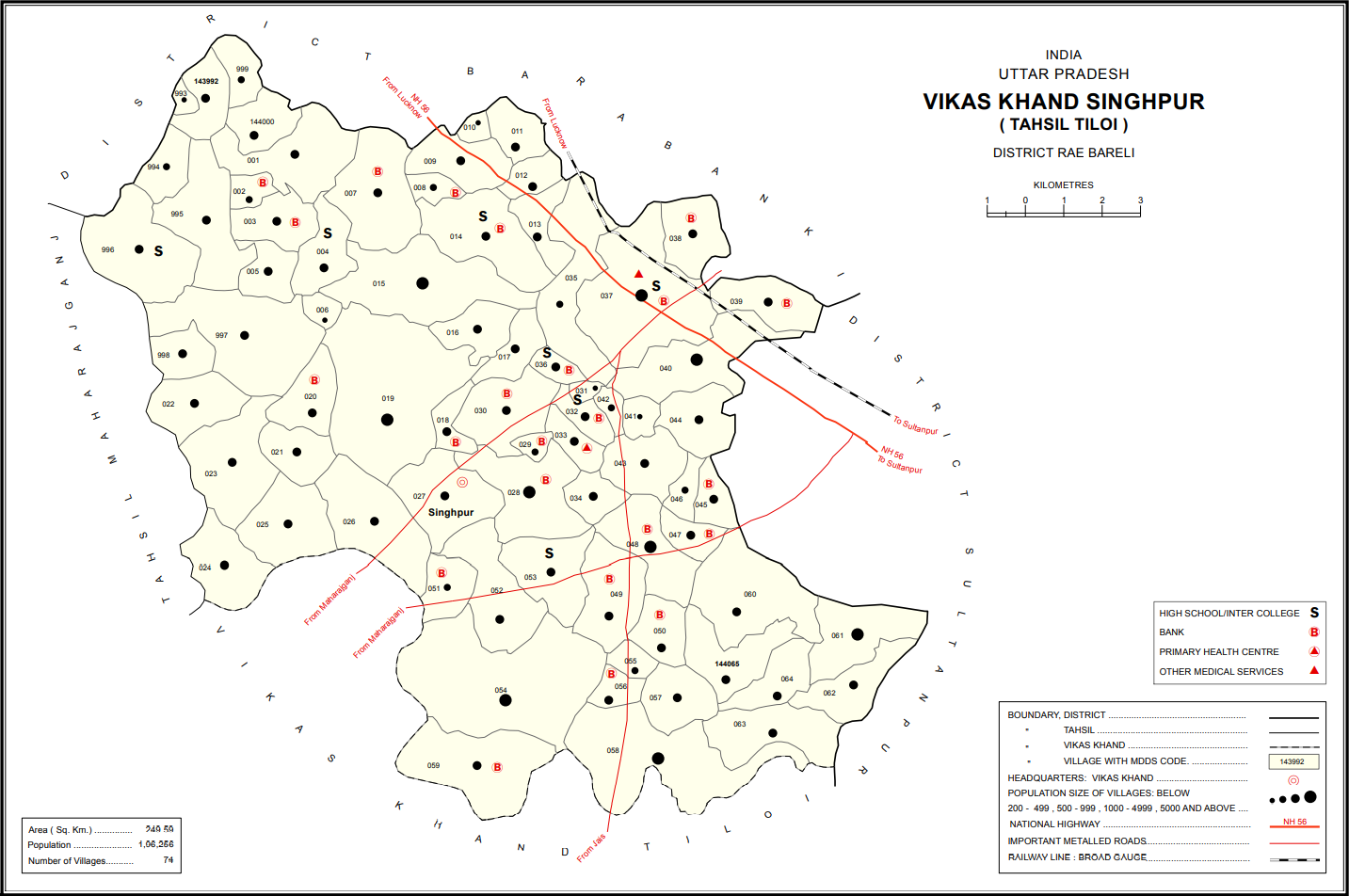
- Map showing Kotwa (#014) in Singhpur CD block

- Location in Uttar Pradesh, India
- Coordinates: 26.547486°N 81.446701°E
- Country India: India
- State: Uttar Pradesh
- District: Raebareli

Area
  - Total: 5.703 km^{2} (2.202 sq mi)

Population (2011)
  - Total: 4,832
  - Density: 847.3/km^{2} (2,194/sq mi)

Languages
  - Official: Hindi
- Time zone: UTC+5:30 (IST)
- PIN: 229308
- Vehicle registration: UP-35

Kotwa is a village in Singhpur block of Rae Bareli district, Uttar Pradesh, India. As of 2011, its population is 4,832, in 854 households. It has one primary school and no healthcare facilities.

The 1961 census recorded Kotwa as comprising 11 hamlets, with a total population of 1,860 people (930 male and 939 female), in 406 households and 382 physical houses. The area of the village was given as 1,453 acres.

The 1981 census recorded Kotwa as having a population of 2,446 people, in 551 households, and having an area of 575.86 hectares.
