= Konchi, Raebareli =

Konchi
- Village
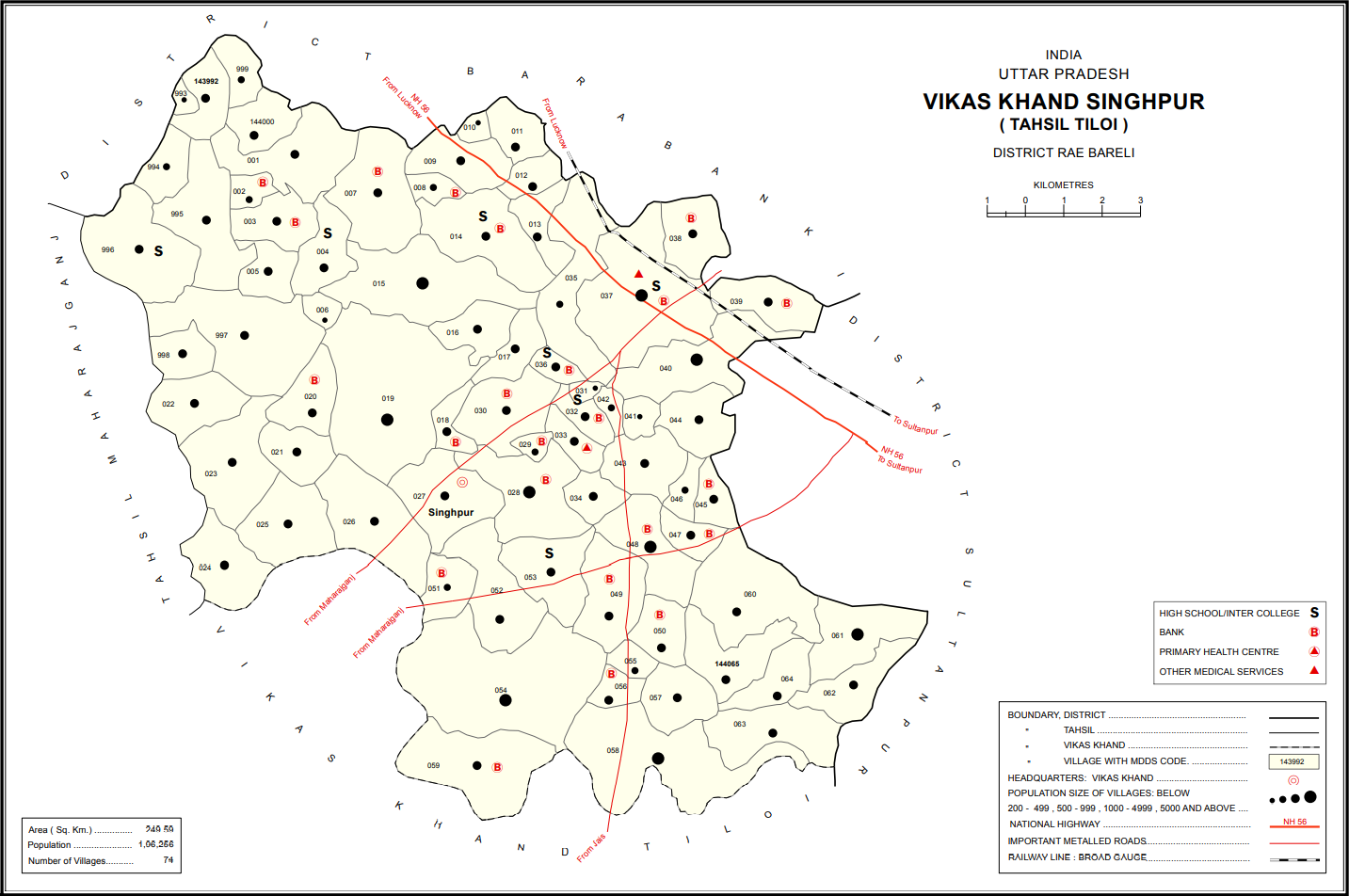
- Map showing Konchi (#057) in Singhpur CD block

- Location in Uttar Pradesh, India
- Coordinates: 26.429724°N 81.501242°E
- Country India: India
- State: Uttar Pradesh
- District: Raebareli

Area
  - Total: 2.643 km^{2} (1.020 sq mi)

Population (2011)
  - Total: 1,914
  - Density: 724.2/km^{2} (1,876/sq mi)

Languages
  - Official: Hindi
- Time zone: UTC+5:30 (IST)
- PIN: 229308
- Vehicle registration: UP-35

Konchi is a village in Singhpur block of Rae Bareli district, Uttar Pradesh, India. As of 2011, its population is 1,914, in 318 households.

The 1961 census recorded Konchi as comprising 6 hamlets, with a total population of 693 people (389 male and 304 female), in 156 households and 137 physical houses. The area of the village was given as 691 acres.

The 1981 census recorded Konchi as having a population of 917 people, in 175 households, and having an area of 280.04 hectares.
