= Sarai Madho =

Sarai Madho Sarāi Mādho
- Village
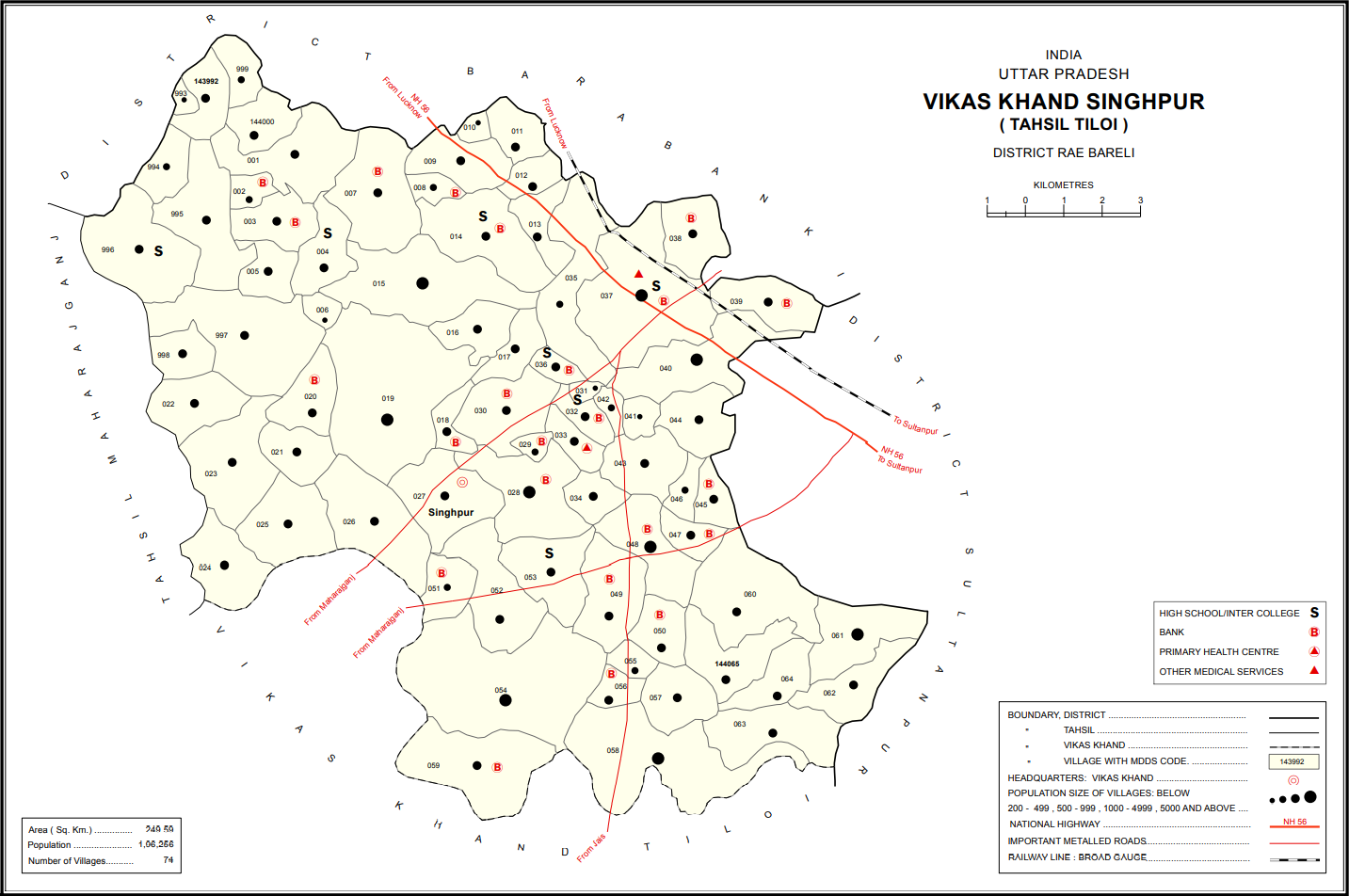
- Map showing Sarai Madho (#038) in Singhpur CD block

- Location in Uttar Pradesh, India
- Coordinates: 26.53871°N 81.514377°E
- Country India: India
- State: Uttar Pradesh
- District: Raebareli

Area
  - Total: 2.59 km^{2} (1.00 sq mi)

Population (2011)
  - Total: 1,212
  - Density: 468/km^{2} (1,210/sq mi)

Languages
  - Official: Hindi
- Time zone: UTC+5:30 (IST)
- PIN: 229308
- Vehicle registration: UP-35

Sarai Madho is a village in Singhpur block of Rae Bareli district, Uttar Pradesh, India. As of 2011, its population is 1,212, in 219 households. It has no schools and no healthcare facilities.

The 1961 census recorded Sarai Madho as comprising 4 hamlets, with a total population of 631 people (337 male and 294 female), in 149 households and 144 physical houses. The area of the village was given as 690 acres.

The 1981 census recorded Sarai Madho as having a population of 761 people, in 171 households, and having an area of 280.04 hectares.
