= Mirzagarh =

Mirzagarh Mirzāgarh
- Village
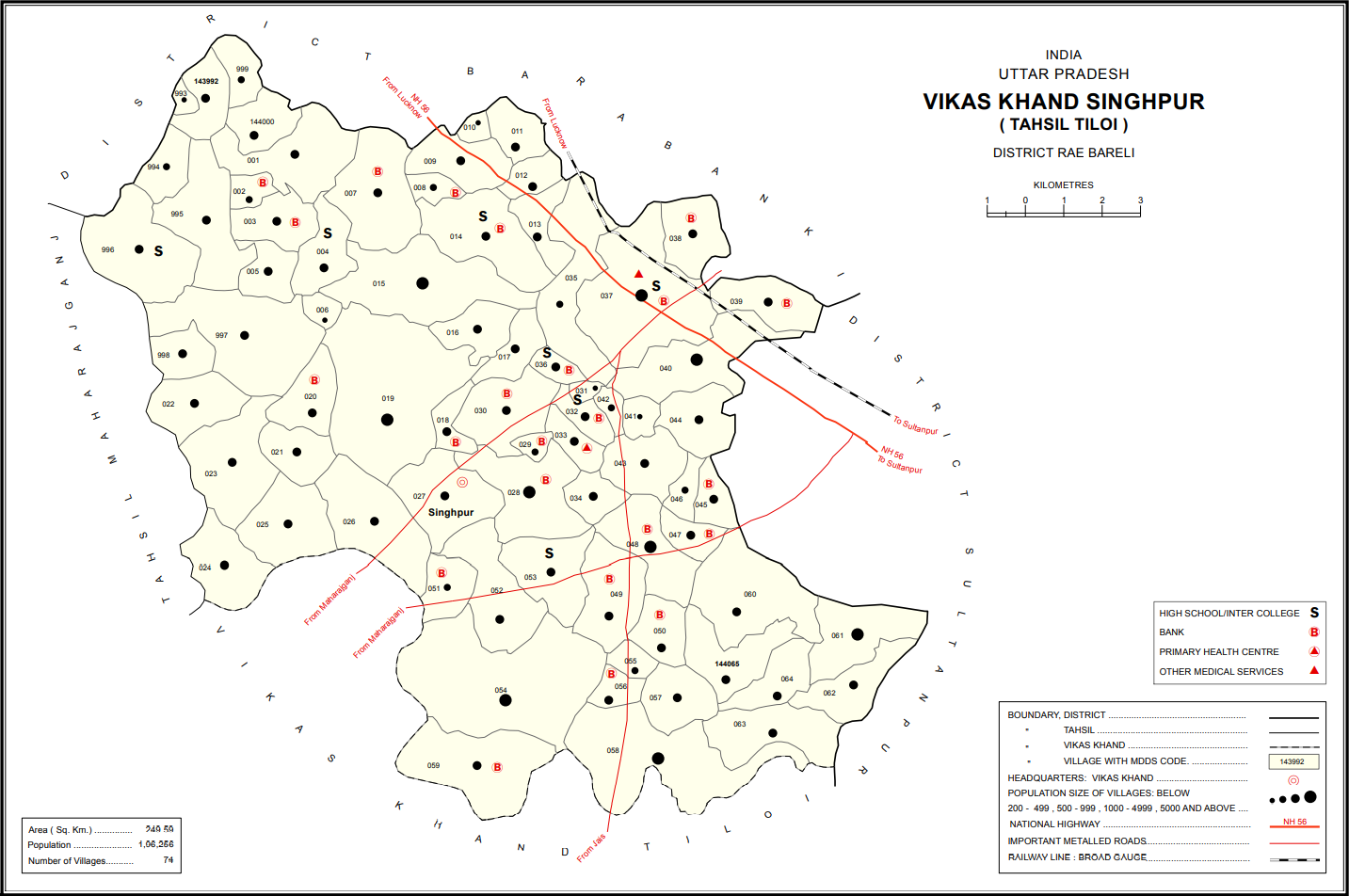
- Map showing Mirzagarh (#062) in Singhpur CD block

- Location in Uttar Pradesh, India
- Coordinates: 26.43249°N 81.540681°E
- Country India: India
- State: Uttar Pradesh
- District: Raebareli

Area
  - Total: 2.585 km^{2} (0.998 sq mi)

Population (2011)
  - Total: 2,596
  - Density: 1,004/km^{2} (2,601/sq mi)

Languages
  - Official: Hindi
- Time zone: UTC+5:30 (IST)
- PIN: 229308
- Vehicle registration: UP-35

Mirzagarh is a village in Singhpur block of Rae Bareli district, Uttar Pradesh, India. As of 2011, its population is 2,596, in 454 households. It has one primary school and no healthcare facilities.

The 1961 census recorded Mirzagarh as comprising 8 hamlets, with a total population of 919 people (465 male and 454 female), in 191 households and 185 physical houses. The area of the village was given as 657 acres.

The 1981 census recorded Mirzagarh as having a population of 1,124 people, in 283 households, and having an area of 259.93 hectares.
