= Jijauli =

- Village
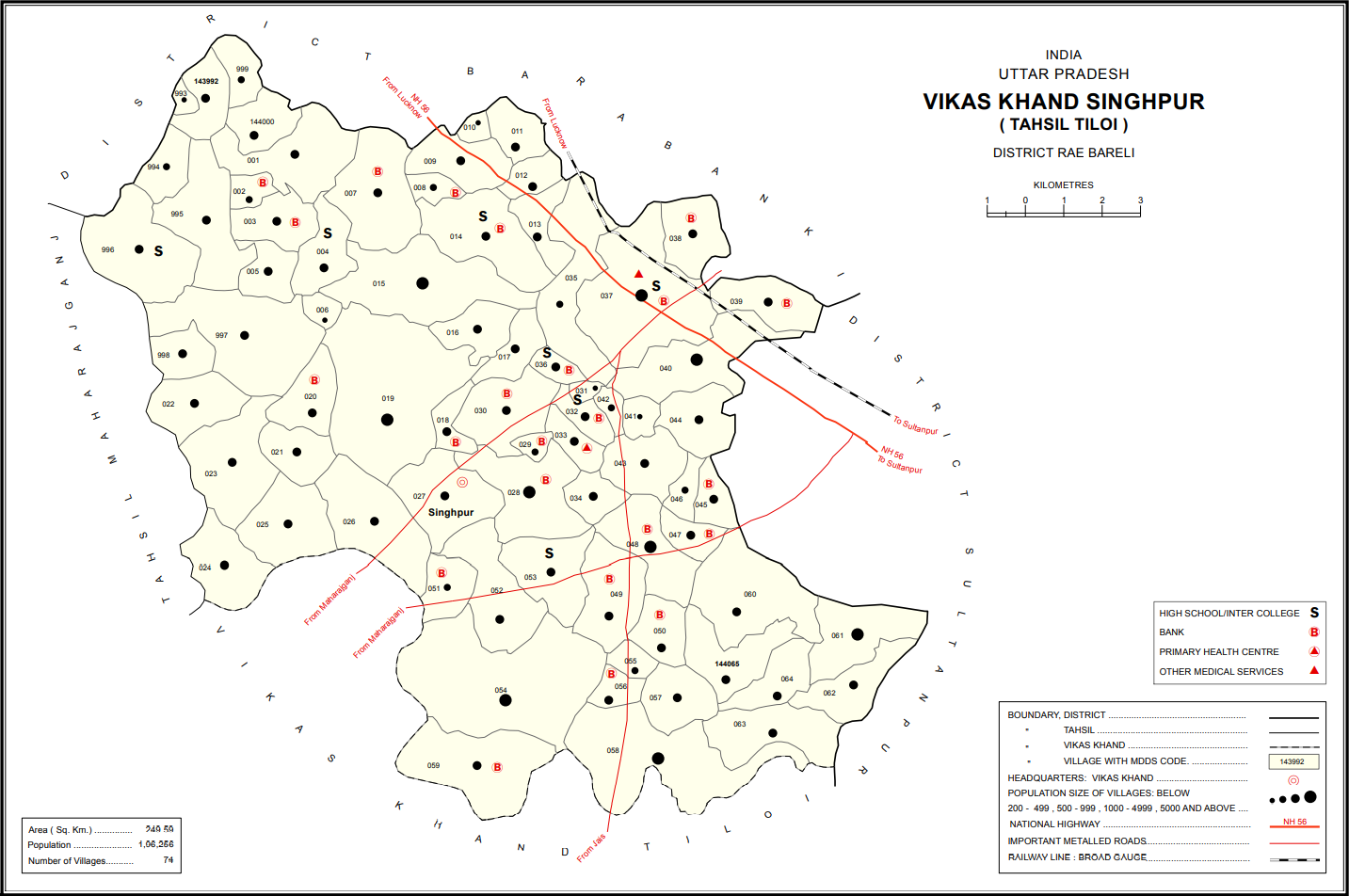
- Map showing Jijauli (#044) in Singhpur CD block

- Location in Uttar Pradesh, India
- Coordinates: 26.495372°N 81.508026°E
- Country India: India
- State: Uttar Pradesh
- District: Raebareli

Area
  - Total: 3.036 km^{2} (1.172 sq mi)

Population (2011)
  - Total: 1,664
  - Density: 548.1/km^{2} (1,420/sq mi)

Languages
  - Official: Hindi
- Time zone: UTC+5:30 (IST)
- PIN: 229308
- Vehicle registration: UP-35

Jijauli is a village in Singhpur block of Rae Bareli district, Uttar Pradesh, India. It is located 45 km from Raebareli, the district's headquarters. As of 2011, its population was 1,664, in 324 households. It has one primary school and no healthcare facilities.

The 1961 census recorded Jijauli as comprising 9 hamlets, with a total population of 791 people (404 male and 387 female), in 180 households and 175 physical houses. The area of the village was given as 728 acres.

The 1981 census recorded Jijauli as having a population of 1,029 people, in 231 households, and having an area of 305.54 hectares.
