= Rastamau =

Rastamau Rastāmau
- Village
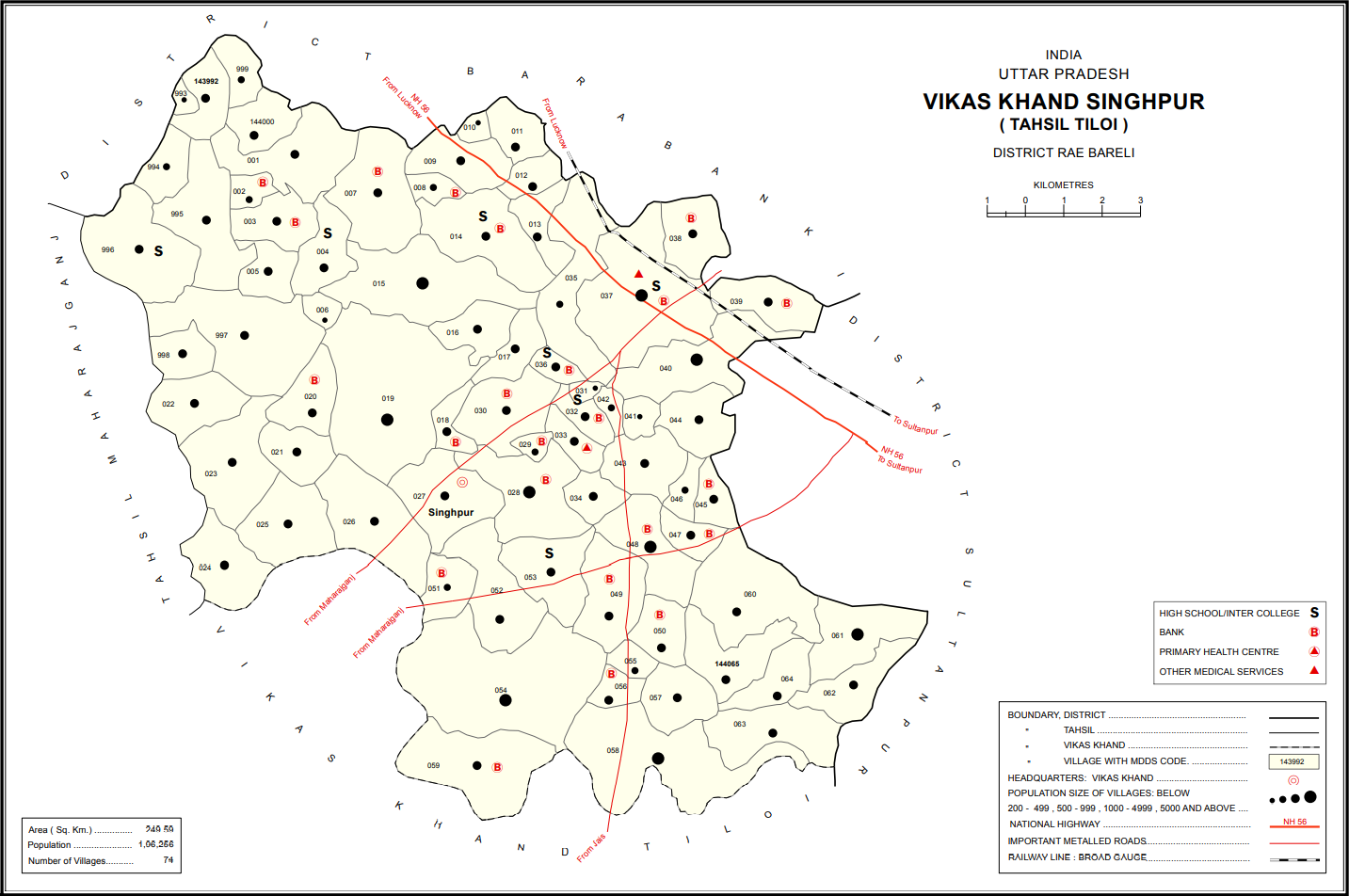
- Map showing Rastamau (#058) in Singhpur CD block

- Location in Uttar Pradesh, India
- Coordinates: 26.41965°N 81.488901°E
- Country India: India
- State: Uttar Pradesh
- District: Raebareli

Area
  - Total: 6.971 km^{2} (2.692 sq mi)

Population (2011)
  - Total: 7,859
  - Density: 1,127/km^{2} (2,920/sq mi)

Languages
  - Official: Hindi
- Time zone: UTC+5:30 (IST)
- PIN: 229308
- Vehicle registration: UP-35

Rastamau is a village in Singhpur block of Rae Bareli district, Uttar Pradesh, India. It hosts a market twice per week, on Wednesday and Saturday, and grain is the main article of trade. As of 2011, Rastamau has a population of 7,859, in 1,222 households.

The 1961 census recorded Rastamau as comprising 13 hamlets, with a total population of 2,681 people (1,222 male and 1,459 female), in 547 households and 519 physical houses. The area of the village was given as 1,761acres and it had a post office at that point. Average attendance of the biweekly market was then about 300 people.

The 1981 census recorded Rastamau as having a population of 3,941 people, in 714 households, and having an area of 712.66 hectares.
