= Khara, Raebareli =

Khara Khāra
- Village
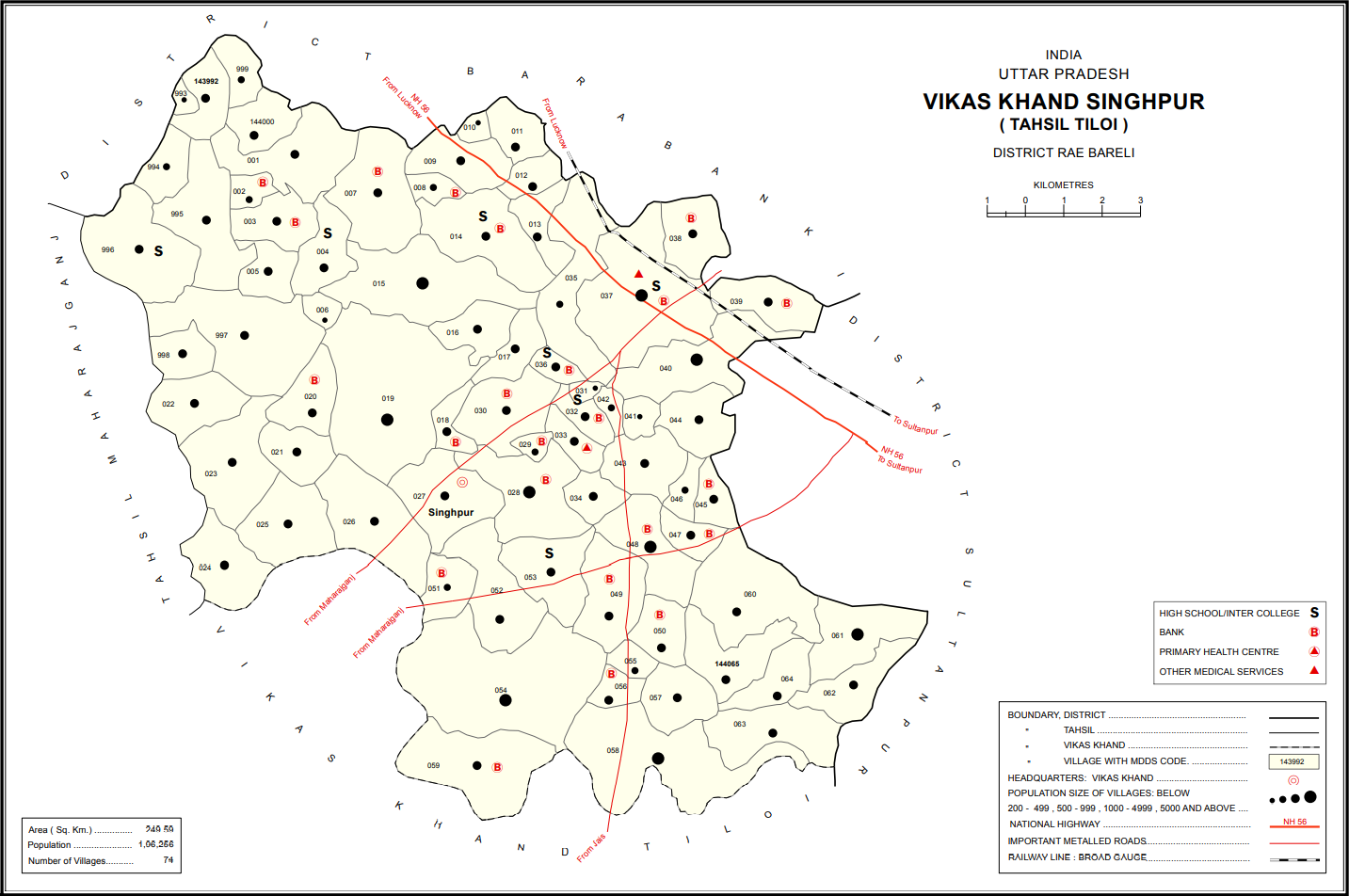
- Map showing Khara (#019) in Singhpur CD block

- Location in Uttar Pradesh, India
- Coordinates: 26.510875°N 81.423195°E
- Country India: India
- State: Uttar Pradesh
- District: Raebareli

Area
  - Total: 11.582 km^{2} (4.472 sq mi)

Population (2011)
  - Total: 7,320
  - Density: 632/km^{2} (1,640/sq mi)

Languages
  - Official: Hindi
- Time zone: UTC+5:30 (IST)
- PIN: 229308
- Vehicle registration: UP-35

Khara is a village in Singhpur block of Rae Bareli district, Uttar Pradesh, India. As of 2011, its population is 7,320, in 1,339 households.

The 1961 census recorded Khara as comprising 25 hamlets, with a total population of 2,906 people (1,469 male and 1,437 female), in 630 households and 629 physical houses. The area of the village was given as 2,903 acres and it had a post office at that point.

The 1981 census recorded Khara as having a population of 3,779 people, in 864 households, and having an area of 1,158.61 hectares.
