= Ashrafpur, Singhpur, Raebareli =

Ashrafpur
- Village
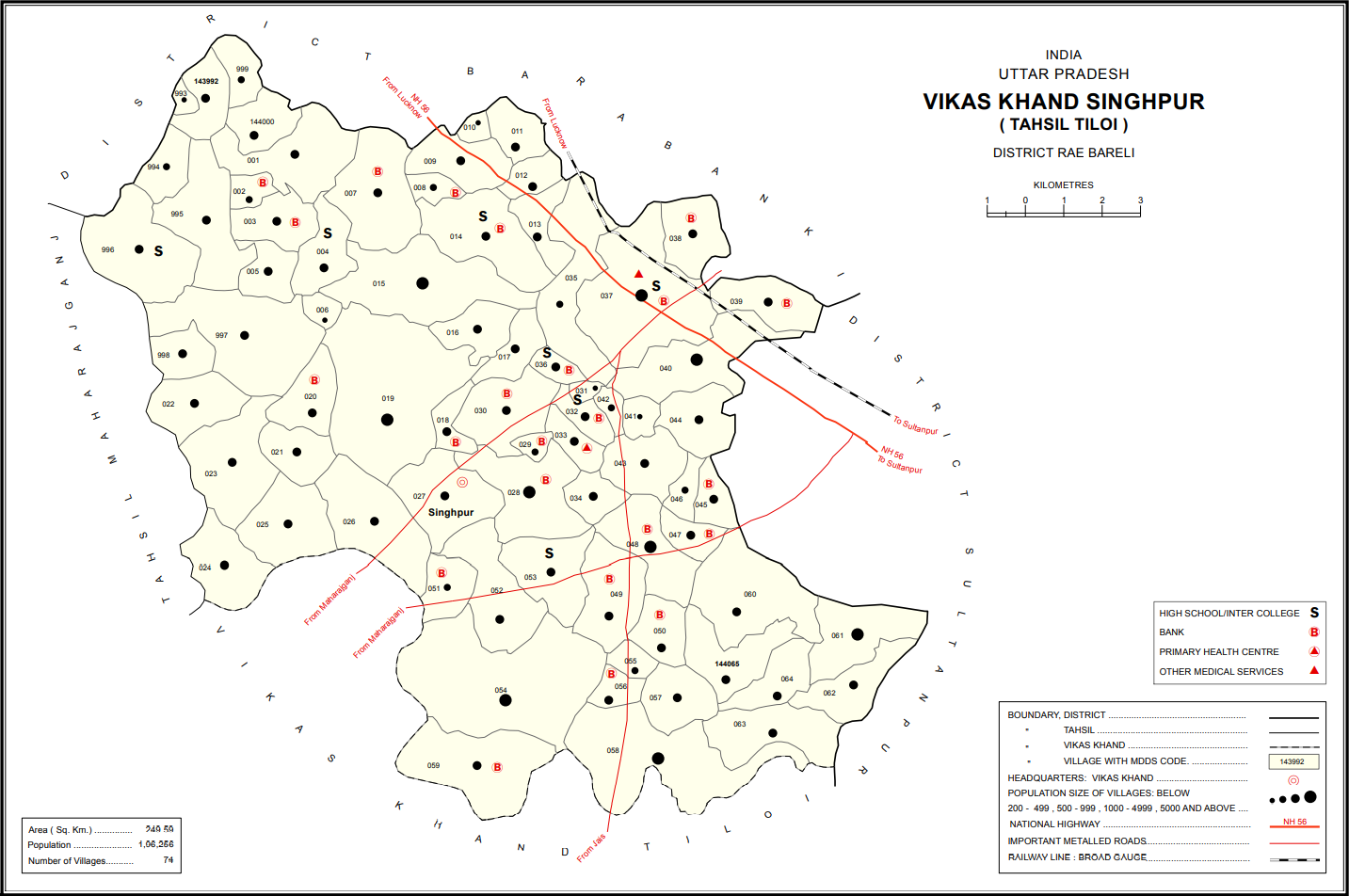
- Map showing Ashrafpur (#012) in Singhpur CD block

- Location in Uttar Pradesh, India
- Coordinates: 26.555568°N 81.460093°E
- Country India: India
- State: Uttar Pradesh
- District: Raebareli

Area
  - Total: 1.843 km^{2} (0.712 sq mi)

Population (2011)
  - Total: 1,373
  - Density: 745.0/km^{2} (1,929/sq mi)

Languages
  - Official: Hindi
- Time zone: UTC+5:30 (IST)
- PIN: 229308
- Vehicle registration: UP-35

Ashrafpur is a village in Singhpur block of Rae Bareli district, Uttar Pradesh, India. As of 2011, its population is 1,373, in 262 households. It has no schools and no healthcare facilities.

The 1961 census recorded Ashrafpur (here spelled "Asrafpur") as comprising 2 hamlets, with a total population of 432 people (221 male and 211 female), in 124 households and 119 physical houses. The area of the village was given as 309 acres.

The 1981 census recorded Ashrafpur as having a population of 595 people, in 129 households, and having an area of 138.00 hectares.
