= Phula =

Phula Phoola
- Village
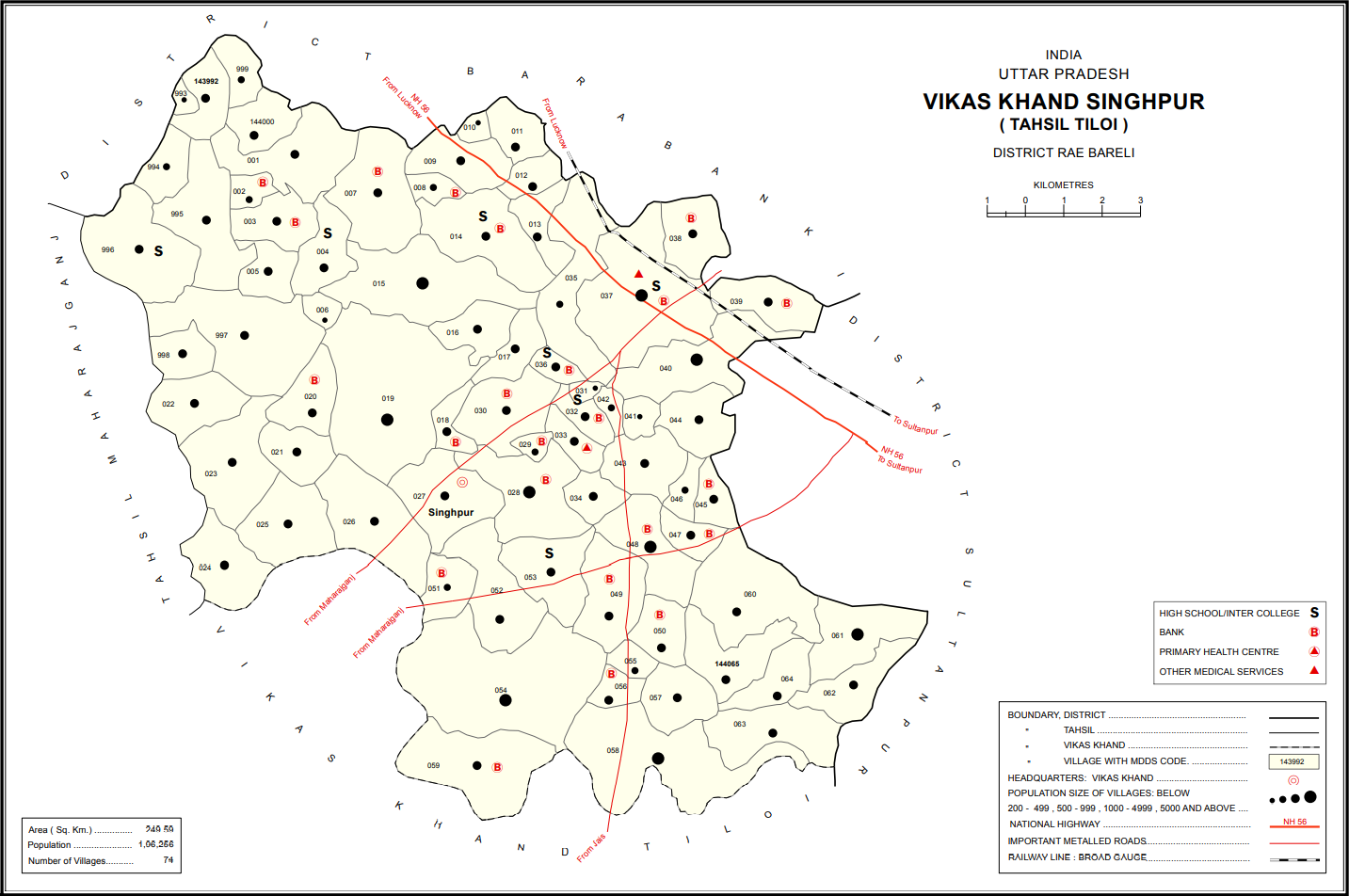
- Map showing Phula (#054) in Singhpur CD block

- Location in Uttar Pradesh, India
- Coordinates: 26.438452°N 81.467325°E
- Country India: India
- State: Uttar Pradesh
- District: Raebareli

Area
  - Total: 13.597 km^{2} (5.250 sq mi)

Population (2011)
  - Total: 7,726
  - Density: 568.2/km^{2} (1,472/sq mi)

Languages
  - Official: Hindi
- Time zone: UTC+5:30 (IST)
- PIN: 229308
- Vehicle registration: UP-35

Phula is a village in Singhpur block of Rae Bareli district, Uttar Pradesh, India. As of 2011, its population is 7,726, in 1,383 households. It has one primary school and no healthcare facilities.

The 1961 census recorded Phula as comprising 21 hamlets, with a total population of 3,378 people (1,697 male and 1,681 female), in 767 households and 753 physical houses. The area of the village was given as 3,507 acres and it had a post office at that point.

The 1981 census recorded Phula as having a population of 4,808 people, in 953 households, and having an area of 1,418.83 hectares.
