= Naukhera =

- Village
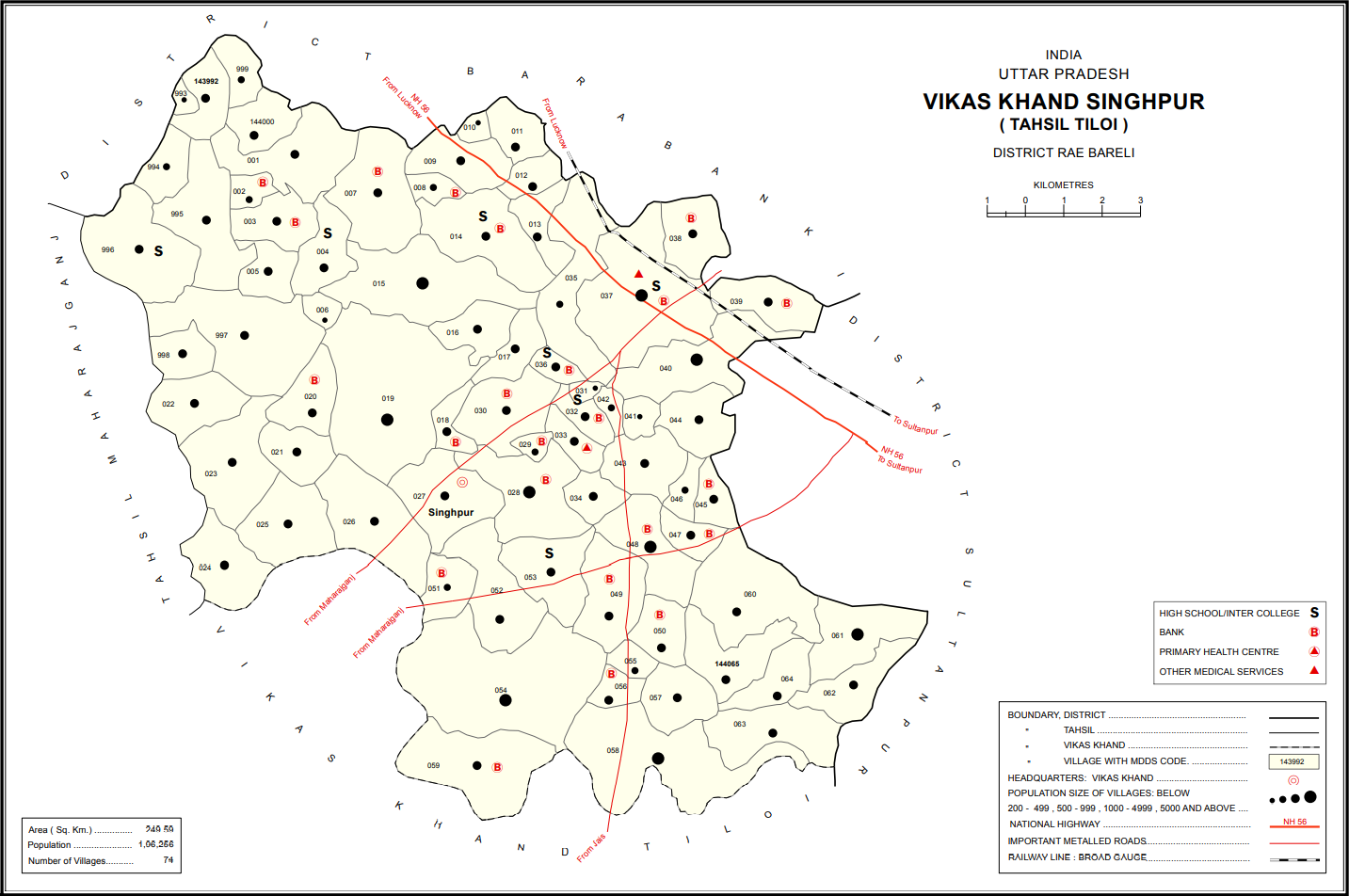
- Map showing Naukhera (#009) in Singhpur CD block

- Location in Uttar Pradesh, India
- Coordinates: 26.553552°N 81.446427°E
- Country India: India
- State: Uttar Pradesh
- District: Raebareli

Area
  - Total: 2.838 km^{2} (1.096 sq mi)

Population (2011)
  - Total: 1,668
  - Density: 587.7/km^{2} (1,522/sq mi)

Languages
  - Official: Hindi
- Time zone: UTC+5:30 (IST)
- PIN: 229308
- Vehicle registration: UP-35

Naukhera is a village in Singhpur block of Rae Bareli district, Uttar Pradesh, India. As of 2011, its population is 1,668, in 298 households. It has no schools and no healthcare facilities.

The 1961 census recorded Naukhera (here spelled as two words, "Nau Khera") as comprising 2 hamlets, with a total population of 715 people (335 male and 380 female), in 170 households and 162 physical houses. The area of the village was given as 657 acres.

The 1981 census recorded Naukhera (also spelled as "Nau Khera") as having a population of 838 people, in 200 households, and having an area of 296.63 hectares.
