= Rajapur, Singhpur, Raebareli =

Rajapur Rājāpur
- Village
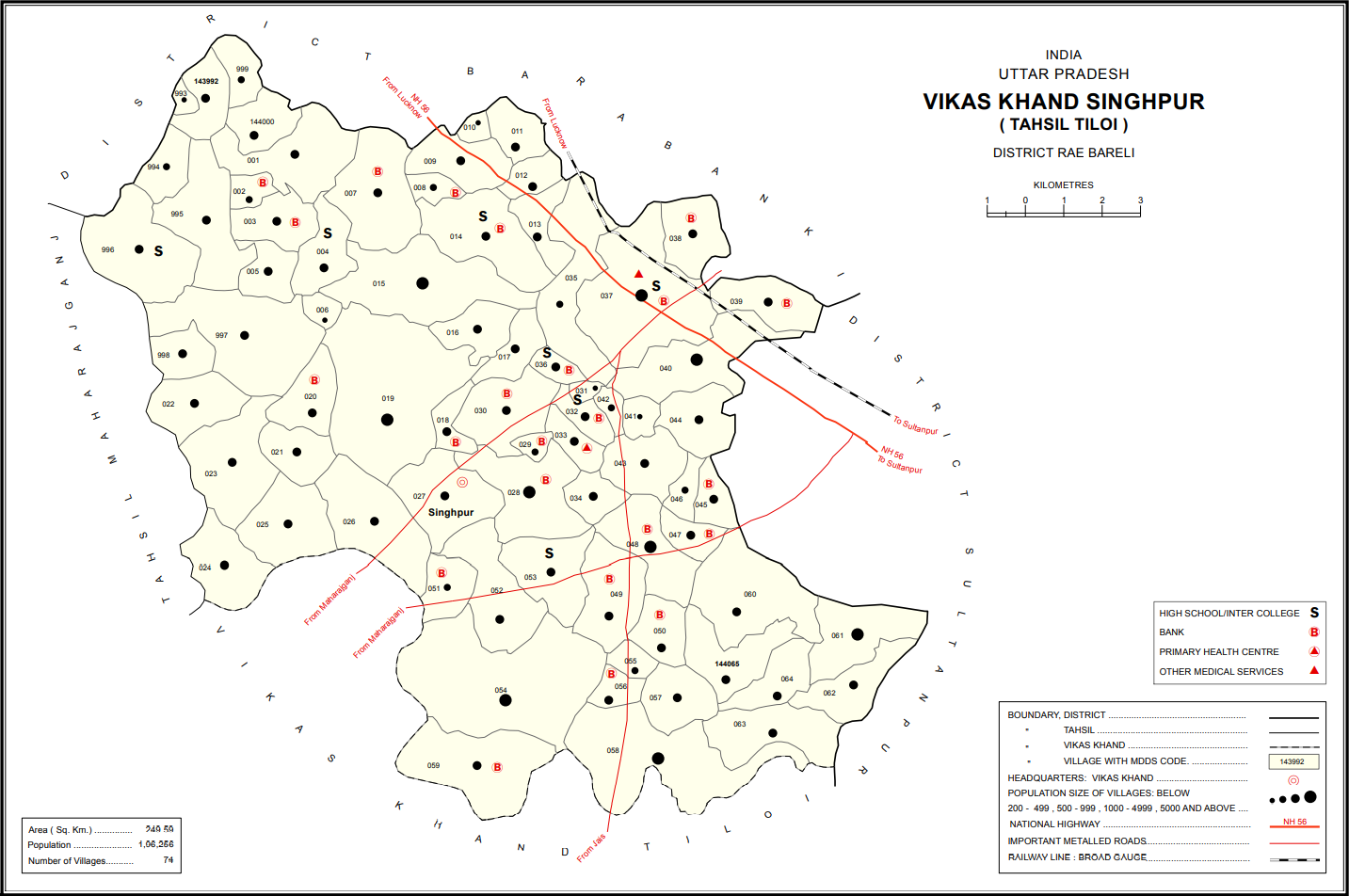
- Map showing Rajapur (#049) in Singhpur CD block

- Location in Uttar Pradesh, India
- Coordinates: 26.462697°N 81.492061°E
- Country India: India
- State: Uttar Pradesh
- District: Raebareli

Area
  - Total: 3.46 km^{2} (1.34 sq mi)

Population (2011)
  - Total: 3,954
  - Density: 1,140/km^{2} (2,960/sq mi)

Languages
  - Official: Hindi
- Time zone: UTC+5:30 (IST)
- PIN: 229308
- Vehicle registration: UP-35

Rajapur is a village in Singhpur block of Rae Bareli district, Uttar Pradesh, India. As of 2011, its population is 3,954, in 659 households. It has one primary school and no healthcare facilities.

The 1961 census recorded Rajapur as comprising 7 hamlets, with a total population of 1,208 people (595 male and 613 female), in 264 households and 254 physical houses. The area of the village was given as 886 acres.

The 1981 census recorded Rajapur as having a population of 1,681 people, in 341 households, and having an area of 357.75 hectares.
