= Panhauna =

- Village
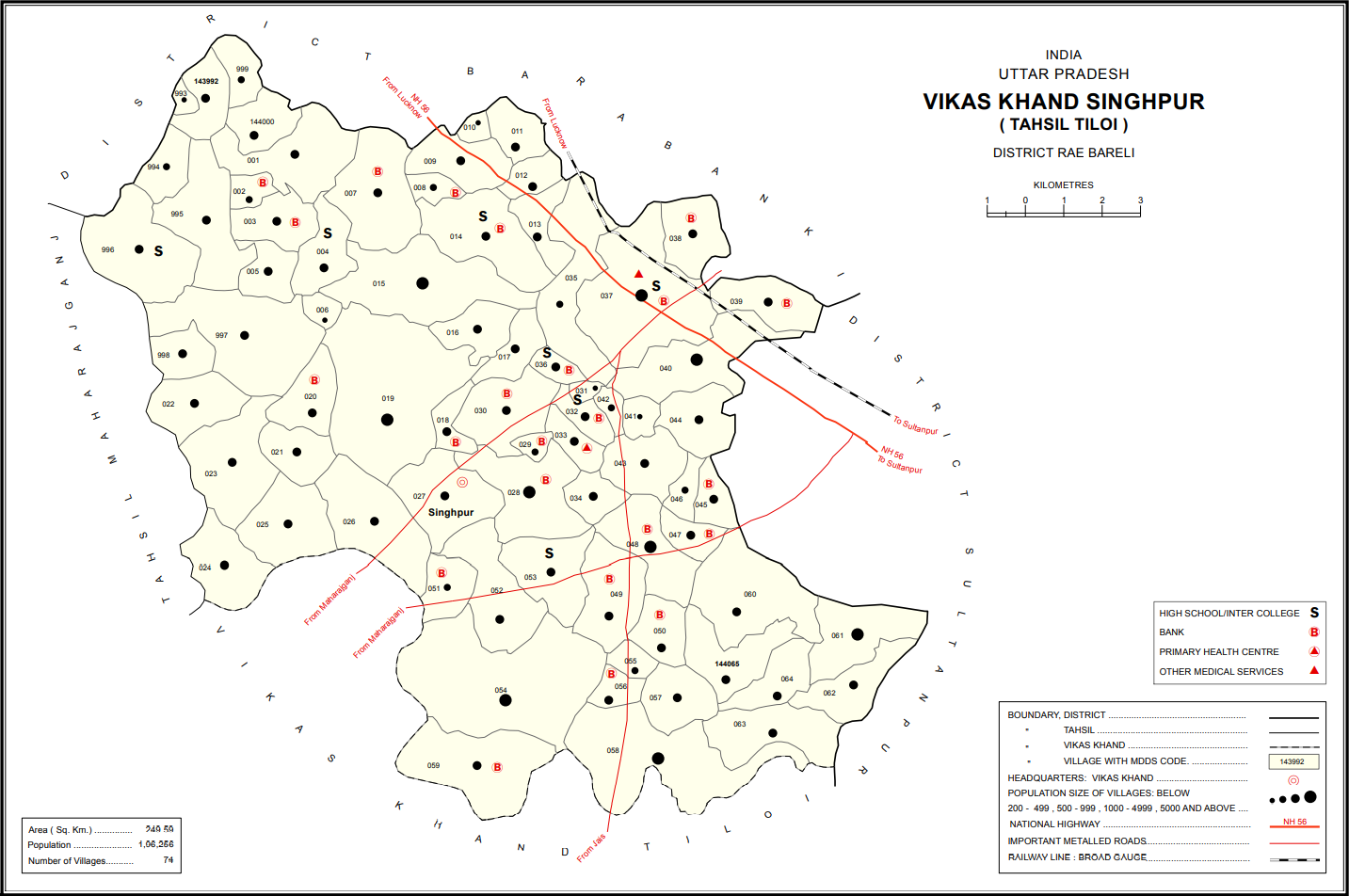
- Map showing Panhauna (#028) in Singhpur CD block

- Location in Uttar Pradesh, India
- Coordinates: 26.486546°N 81.457966°E
- Country India: India
- State: Uttar Pradesh
- District: Raebareli

Area
  - Total: 8.907 km^{2} (3.439 sq mi)

Population (2011)
  - Total: 7,075
  - Density: 794.3/km^{2} (2,057/sq mi)

Languages
  - Official: Hindi
- Time zone: UTC+5:30 (IST)
- PIN: 229308
- Vehicle registration: UP-35

Panhauna is a village in Singhpur block of Rae Bareli district, Uttar Pradesh, India. As of 2011, its population is 7,075, in 1,307 households. It has one primary school and no healthcare facilities.

== History ==
Panhauna was historically the seat of a taluqdari estate held by a branch of the Bais Rajputs. This family belonged to the Gaumaha or Gandeo subdivision of the broader Kath Bais tribe and supposedly came to the area from Gahu Munj near Delhi sometime around the year 1300. Under their leader, Banar Sah, they conquered the Bhars and Dhobis in the area. Banar Sah had 6 sons who divided the original lands between them, and the Panhauna taluqdars were descended from the eldest, Raja Rawat.

The 1961 census recorded Panhauna as comprising 20 hamlets, with a total population of 2,587 people (1,303 male and 1,284 female), in 599 households and 585 physical houses. The area of the village was given as 2,269 acres and it had a post office at that point.

The 1981 census recorded Panhauna as having a population of 3,727 people, in 786 households, and having an area of 910.54 hectares. The main staple foods are wheat and rice.
