= Anguri, Singhpur, Raebareli =

Anguri
- Village
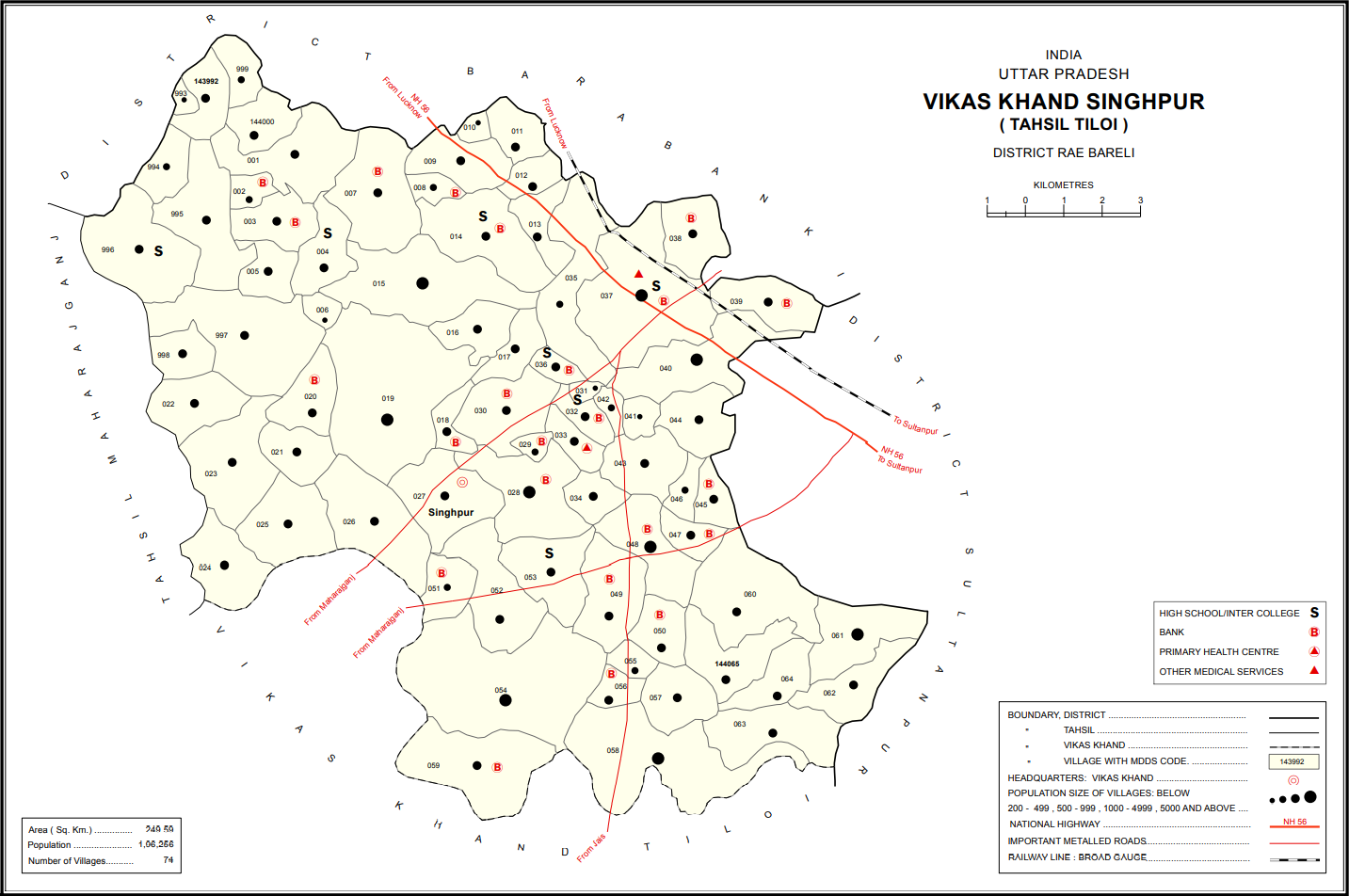
- Map showing Anguri (#011) in Singhpur CD block

- Location in Uttar Pradesh, India
- Coordinates: 26.565375°N 81.457498°E
- Country India: India
- State: Uttar Pradesh
- District: Raebareli

Area
  - Total: 1.843 km^{2} (0.712 sq mi)

Population (2011)
  - Total: 1,373
  - Density: 745.0/km^{2} (1,929/sq mi)

Languages
  - Official: Hindi
- Time zone: UTC+5:30 (IST)
- PIN: 229308
- Vehicle registration: UP-35

Anguri is a village in Singhpur block of Rae Bareli district, Uttar Pradesh, India. As of 2011, its population is 1,373, in 262 households. It has no schools and no healthcare facilities.

The 1961 census recorded Anguri as comprising 2 hamlets, with a total population of 721 people (377 male and 344 female), in 143 households and 133 physical houses. The area of the village was given as 461 acres.

The 1981 census recorded Anguri as having a population of 905 people, in 166 households, and having an area of 184.13 hectares.
