= Hasanpur, Singhpur, Raebareli =

Hasanpur
- Village
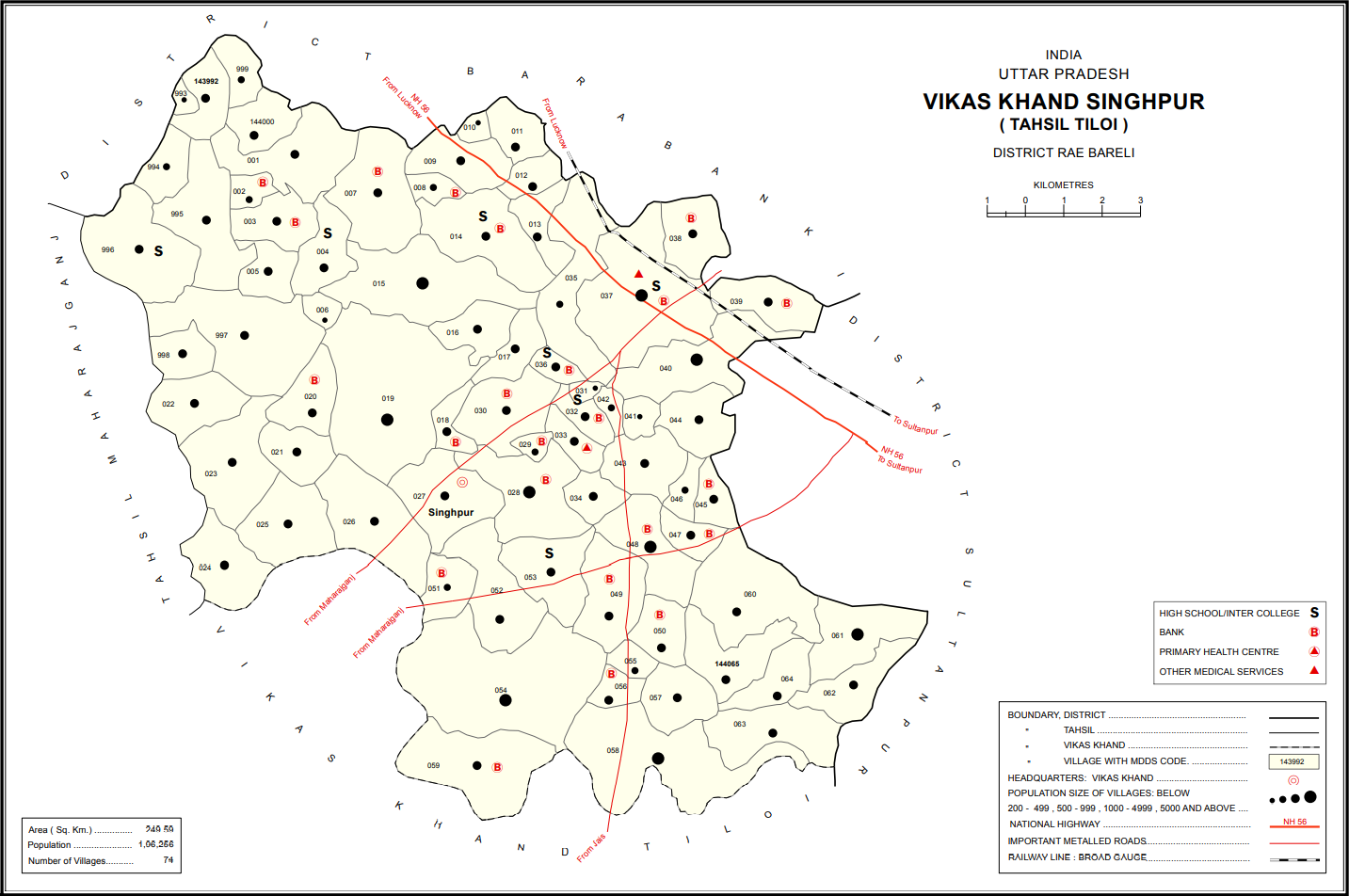
- Map showing Hasanpur (#056) in Singhpur CD block

- Location in Uttar Pradesh, India
- Coordinates: 26.431621°N 81.48583°E
- Country India: India
- State: Uttar Pradesh
- District: Raebareli

Area
  - Total: 1.215 km^{2} (0.469 sq mi)

Population (2011)
  - Total: 1,162
  - Density: 956.4/km^{2} (2,477/sq mi)

Languages
  - Official: Hindi
- Time zone: UTC+5:30 (IST)
- PIN: 229308
- Vehicle registration: UP-35

Hasanpur is a village in Singhpur block of Rae Bareli district, Uttar Pradesh, India. As of 2011, its population was 1,162, in 203 households. It has one primary school and no healthcare facilities.

The 1961 census recorded Hasanpur as comprising 4 hamlets, with a total population of 303 people (132 male and 171 female), in 63 households and 54 physical houses. The area of the village was given as 321 acres.

The 1981 census recorded Hasanpur as having a population of 446 people, in 86 households, and having an area of 129.91 hectares.
