= Lauli, Raebareli =

Lauli
- Village
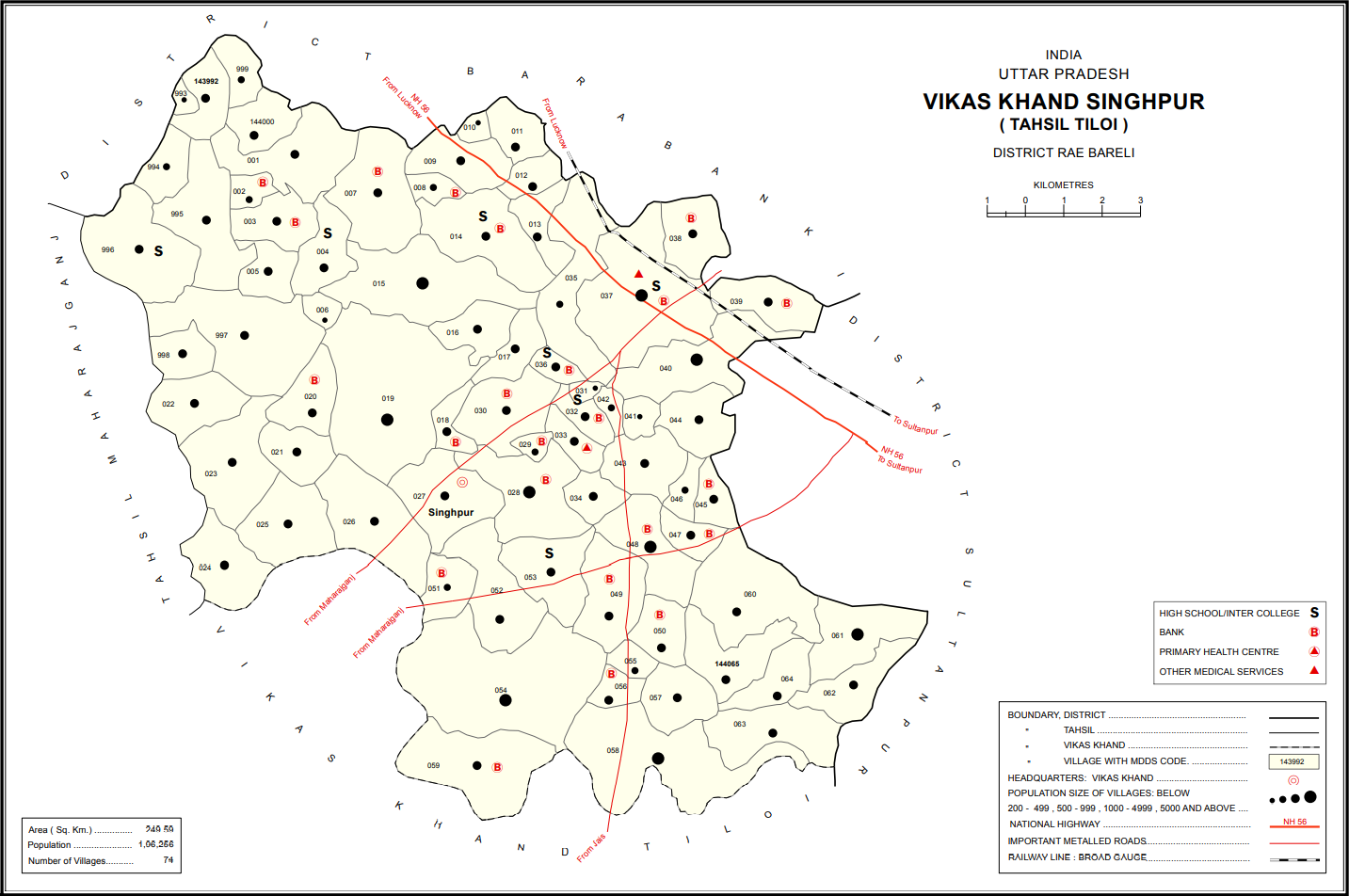
- Map showing Lauli (#001) in Singhpur CD block

- Location in Uttar Pradesh, India
- Coordinates: 26.554453°N 81.402777°E
- Country India: India
- State: Uttar Pradesh
- District: Raebareli

Area
  - Total: 4.185 km^{2} (1.616 sq mi)

Population (2011)
  - Total: 2,864
  - Density: 684.3/km^{2} (1,772/sq mi)

Languages
  - Official: Hindi
- Time zone: UTC+5:30 (IST)
- PIN: 229308
- Vehicle registration: UP-35

Lauli is a village in Singhpur block of Rae Bareli district, Uttar Pradesh, India. As of 2011, its population is 2,864, in 543 households.

The 1961 census recorded Lauli as comprising 9 hamlets, with a total population of 1,447 people (703 male and 744 female), in 305 households and 298 physical houses. The area of the village was given as 1,124 acres.

The 1981 census recorded Lauli as having a population of 1,757 people, in 352 households, and having an area of 452.04 hectares.
