= Fatehpur Assembly constituency =

Fatehpur Assembly constituency may refer to

- Fatehpur, Himachal Pradesh Assembly constituency
- Fatehpur, Rajasthan Assembly constituency
- Fatehpur, Uttar Pradesh Assembly constituency

== See also ==
- Fatehpur (disambiguation)
