= Karangaon =

Karangaon Karangāon
- Village
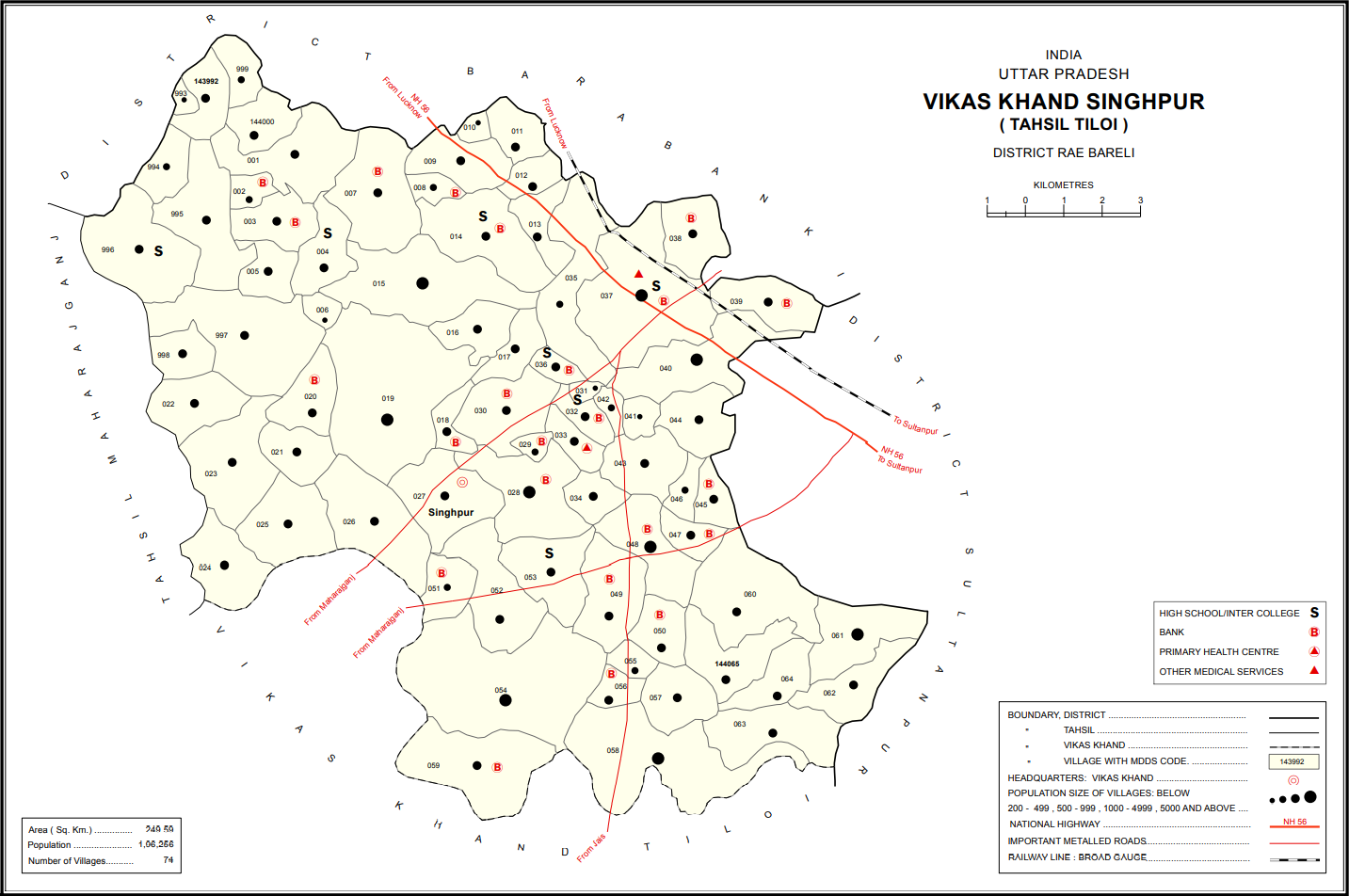
- Map showing Karangaon (#060) in Singhpur CD block

- Location in Uttar Pradesh, India
- Coordinates: 26.457101°N 81.514206°E
- Country India: India
- State: Uttar Pradesh
- District: Raebareli

Area
  - Total: 4.707 km^{2} (1.817 sq mi)

Population (2011)
  - Total: 3,500
  - Density: 740/km^{2} (1,900/sq mi)

Languages
  - Official: Hindi
- Time zone: UTC+5:30 (IST)
- PIN: 229309
- Vehicle registration: UP-36

Karangaon is a village in Singhpur block of Amethi district, Uttar Pradesh, India. As of 2011, its population is 3,500, in 601 households.

The 1961 census recorded Karangaon as comprising 10 hamlets, with a total population of 1,351 people (710 male and 641 female), in 274 households and 261 physical houses. The area of the village was given as 1,180 acres.

The 1981 census recorded Karangaon as having a population of 1,927 people, in 363 households, and having an area of 473.49 hectares.
