= Sikri Vyas =

Sikri Vyas is a village near Kotra in Jalaun district, Uttar Pradesh, India.

The village is located at 25.807001N, 79.355175E, near the river Betwa.
