= Herbert Eastwick Compton =

Herbert Eastwick Compton (16 November 1853 – 1906) was an English novelist, biographer, world traveller, and writer on miscellaneous topics, including the Georgian era and other historical subjects, India, economics and fiscal matters, and dogs.

== Biography ==
His parents were Colonel D'Oyly Compton of the Honourable East India Company Service and Louise Eastwick. Herbert E. Compton was educated at Malvern College and spent twenty-two years in India. Herbert E. Compton was a leader writer for the Tariff Reform League in 1904, was appointed Organising Secretary of the Anti-Tea-Duty League in 1905, and organised the agitation against what the Anti-Tea-Duty League regarded as the British Empire's excessive duty on tea.

The League came about as a result of the excessive duty placed on tea after the Boer War. The idea was first canvassed in November, 1904, af a conference between Mr. C. W. Wallace, of R. G. Shaw & Co., Mr. F. A. Roberts, Chairman of the Indian Tea Association [London], Mr. A. G. Stanton of Gow, Wilson & Stanton, and the late Mr. Herbert Compton. Later, they were joined by Mr. Arthur Bryans, of P. R. Buchanan & Co., in promoting the organization of the League, was which launched at a joint meeting of the India and Ceylon Tea Associations, held at 5, Fenchurch Street, January 18, 1905. The name, Anti-Tea-Duty League, was adopted January 23, 1905. Because of his knowledge of tea, his energetic resourcefulness, and fine advertising talents, the late Mr. Herbert Compton became the organizing secretary. Mr. Compton had been a tea planter in India for more than twenty years. After returning to England he gained quite a reputation as a writer of history and fiction.

H. E. Compton married Lucy Ellinor Faddy (1861–1908). He was the father of Ellice Dorothy Amy Compton (1881–1950), who married Philip Egerton Tickle in 1907, and Florence D'Oyly Compton (1888–1918), who became a British Army nurse in WWI and drowned in a launch accident near Basra, Iraq. H. E. Compton had two famous maternal uncles: Professor Edward Backhouse Eastwick (1814–1883) and Captain William Joseph Eastwick (1808–1889).

He committed suicide at sea in July or August 1906 en route to Madeira.

== Selected publications ==
- A particular account of the European adventurers of Hindustan, from 1784 to 1803. The adventure series. T.F. Unwin. 1892.
- Compton, Herbert (1893). A king's hussar : being the military memoirs for twenty-five years of a troop-sergeant-major of the 14th (King's) hussars.
- A free lance in a far land : being an account of the singular fortunes of Selwyn Fyveways, of Fyveways Hall, in the County of Gloucester, Esquire. Cassell Publishing Co. 1895.
- The inimitable Mrs. Massingham : a romance of Botany Bay. 1900.
- A fury in white velvet. Anthony Treherne & Co. 1901.
- Indian life in town and country. 1902. 1904 edition. G. P. Putnam's sons. 1904.
- Facts and phantasies of a folio grub. Anthony Treherne,i. 1903.
- The palace of spies. A. Treherne. 1903.
- The queen can do no wrong. Chatto & Windus. 1903.
- The twentieth century dog. G. Richards. 1904.
- To defeat the ends of justice. Chatto & Windus. 1906.

=== As co-author ===
- with Erskine Reid: The dramatic peerage, 1891 : personal notes and professional sketches of the actors and actresses of the London stage. The "Peerage" series. General publishing, Dodd, Eyton. 1891.

=== As editor ===
- A Master mariner : being the life and adventures of Captain Robert William Eastwick. The adventure series. 9. T.F. Unwin; Macmillan & co. 1891. (Robert William Eastwick was H. E. Compton's maternal grandfather.)
