= Chilauli, Singhpur, Raebareli (census code 144059) =

Chilauli Chiluli
- Village
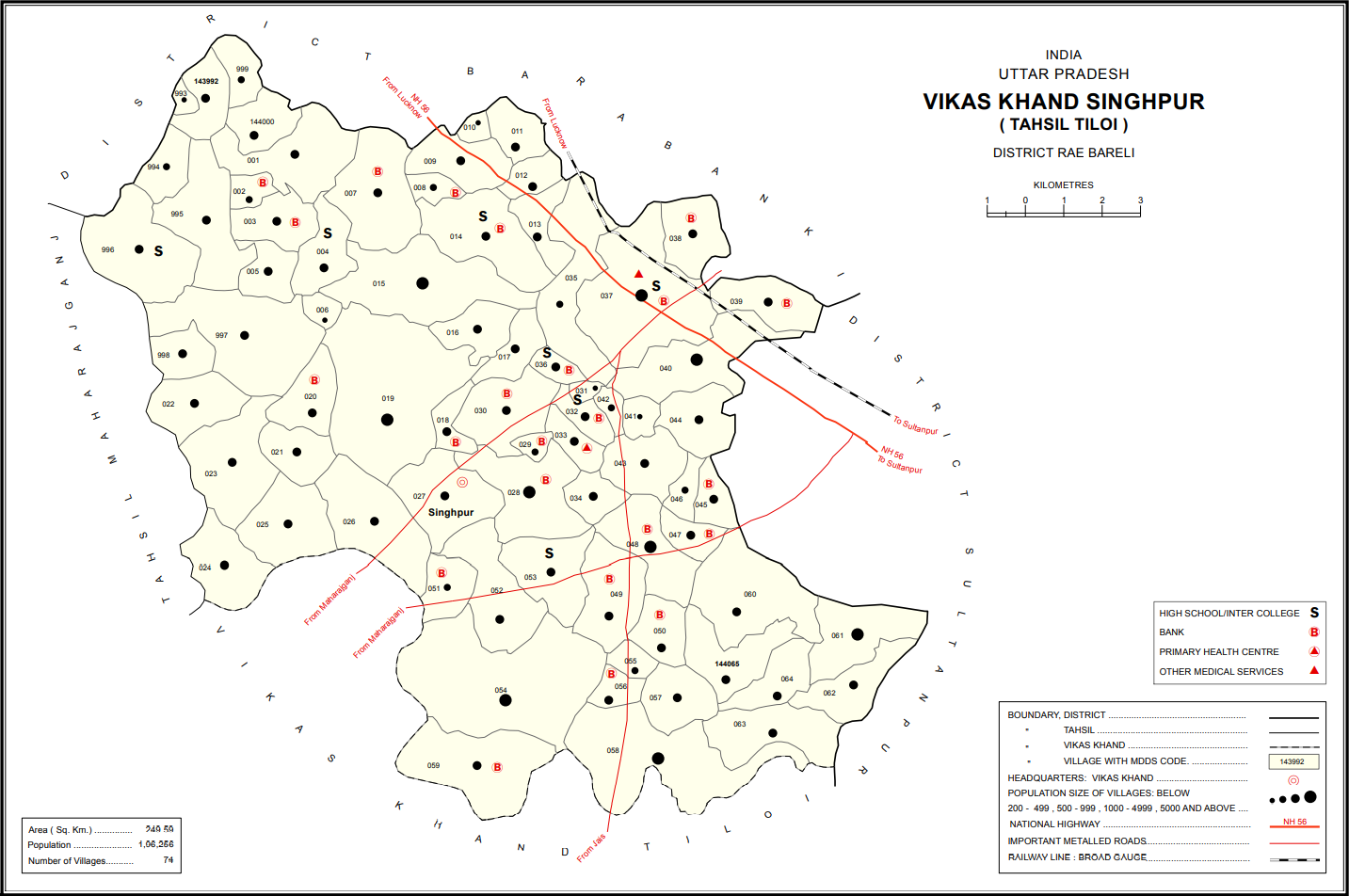
- Map showing Chilauli (#059) in Singhpur CD block

- Location in Uttar Pradesh, India
- Coordinates: 26.415893°N 81.456196°E
- Country India: India
- State: Uttar Pradesh
- District: Raebareli

Area
  - Total: 5.293 km^{2} (2.044 sq mi)

Population (2011)
  - Total: 3,429
  - Density: 647.8/km^{2} (1,678/sq mi)

Languages
  - Official: Hindi
- Time zone: UTC+5:30 (IST)
- PIN: 229308
- Vehicle registration: UP-35

Chilauli is a village in Singhpur block of Rae Bareli district, Uttar Pradesh, India. As of 2011, its population is 3,429, in 627 households. It has one primary school and no healthcare facilities.

The 1961 census recorded Chilauli as comprising 11 hamlets, with a total population of 1,398 people (702 male and 696 female), in 321 households and 310 physical houses. The area of the village was given as 1,416 acres.

The 1981 census recorded Chilauli as having a population of 1,824 people, in 387 households, and having an area of 370.29 hectares.
