= Fatehpur, Raebareli =

Fatehpur
- Village
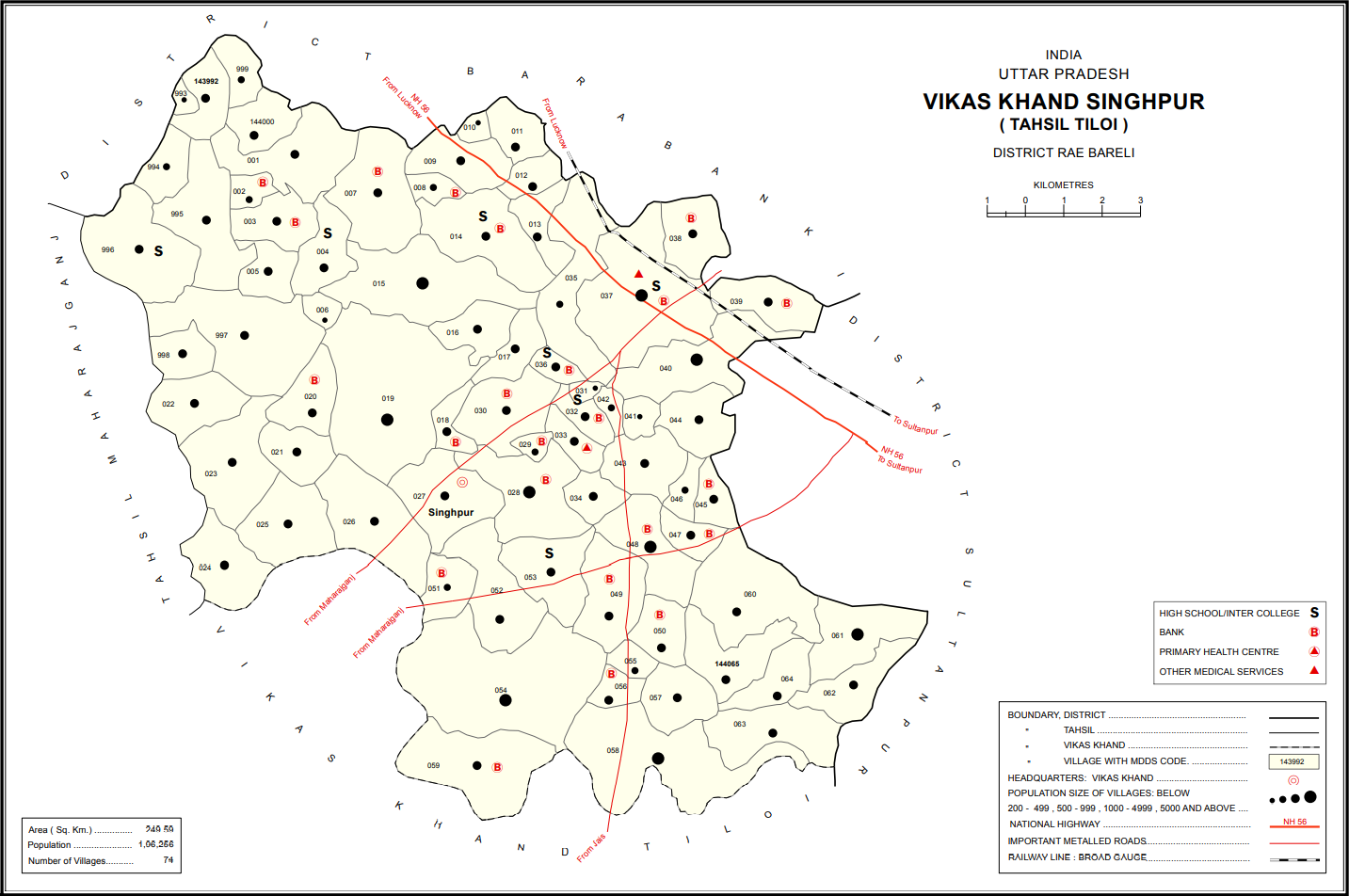
- Map showing Fatehpur (#048) in Singhpur CD block

- Location in Uttar Pradesh, India
- Coordinates: 26.465156°N 81.496395°E
- Country India: India
- State: Uttar Pradesh
- District: Raebareli

Area
  - Total: 3.688 km^{2} (1.424 sq mi)

Population (2011)
  - Total: 5,348
  - Density: 1,450/km^{2} (3,756/sq mi)

Languages
  - Official: Hindi
- Time zone: UTC+5:30 (IST)
- PIN: 229308
- Vehicle registration: UP-35

Fatehpur is a village in Singhpur block of Rae Bareli district, Uttar Pradesh, India. As of 2011, its population is 5,348, in 856 households.

The 1961 census recorded Fatehpur as comprising 9 hamlets, with a total population of 1,545 people (799 male and 746 female), in 345 households and 316 physical houses. The area of the village was given as 981 acres and it had a post office at that point.

The 1981 census recorded Fatehpur as having a population of 2,510 people, in 480 households, and having an area of 396.60 hectares.
