= Sikri Khurd =

Village in Uttar Pradesh

Coordinates: 28.815°N 77.565°E

Sikri Khurd, is a village at the periphery of Modinagar city of Ghaziabad district in Uttar Pradesh, India. The village is known for its 17th century Sikri Mata Temple and related Devi Fair (lit. 'Goddess Fair'), which is organised every year for the nine days of Navaratri of Chaitra month, marking the beginning of a new year in Hindu calendar.
