= Chilauli, Singhpur, Raebareli (census code 144013) =

Chilauli
- Village
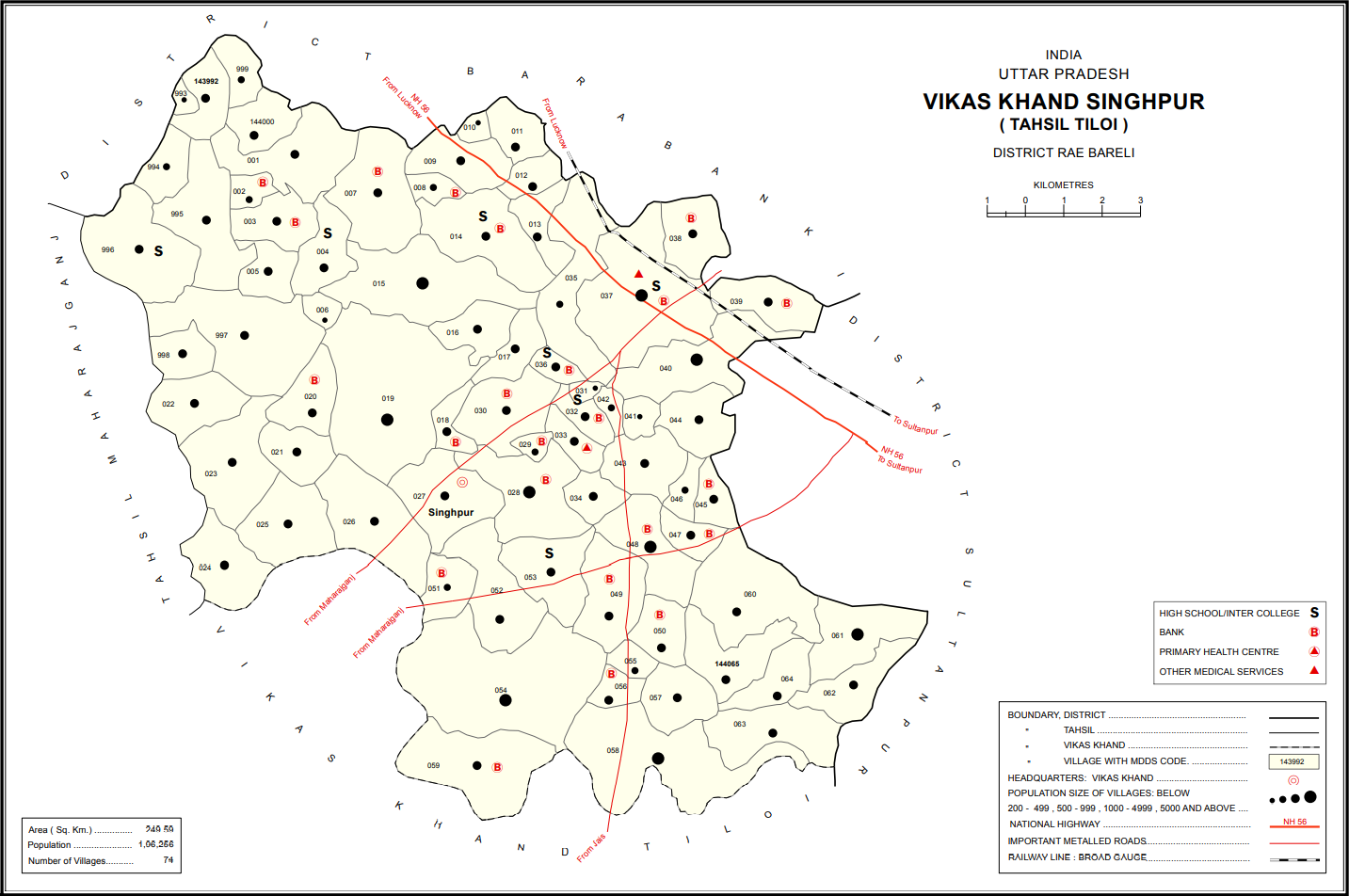
- Map showing Chilauli (#013) in Singhpur CD block

- Location in Uttar Pradesh, India
- Coordinates: 26.544569°N 81.464942°E
- Country India: India
- State: Uttar Pradesh
- District: Raebareli

Area
  - Total: 2.133 km^{2} (0.824 sq mi)

Population (2011)
  - Total: 2,616
  - Density: 1,226/km^{2} (3,176/sq mi)

Languages
  - Official: Hindi
- Time zone: UTC+5:30 (IST)
- PIN: 229308
- Vehicle registration: UP-35

Chilauli is a village in Singhpur block of Rae Bareli district, Uttar Pradesh, India. As of 2011, its population is 2,616, in 432 households. It has one primary school and no healthcare facilities.

The 1961 census recorded Chilauli as comprising 2 hamlets, with a total population of 1,082 people (543 male and 539 female), in 221 households and 220 physical houses. The area of the village was given as 544 acres.

The 1981 census recorded Chilauli as having a population of 1,519 people, in 294 households, and having an area of 219.74 hectares.
