= Sikri Mata Temple =

Hindu Temple in Uttar Pradesh, India

Shri Mahamaya Devi Temple
- श्री महामाया देवी मंदिर
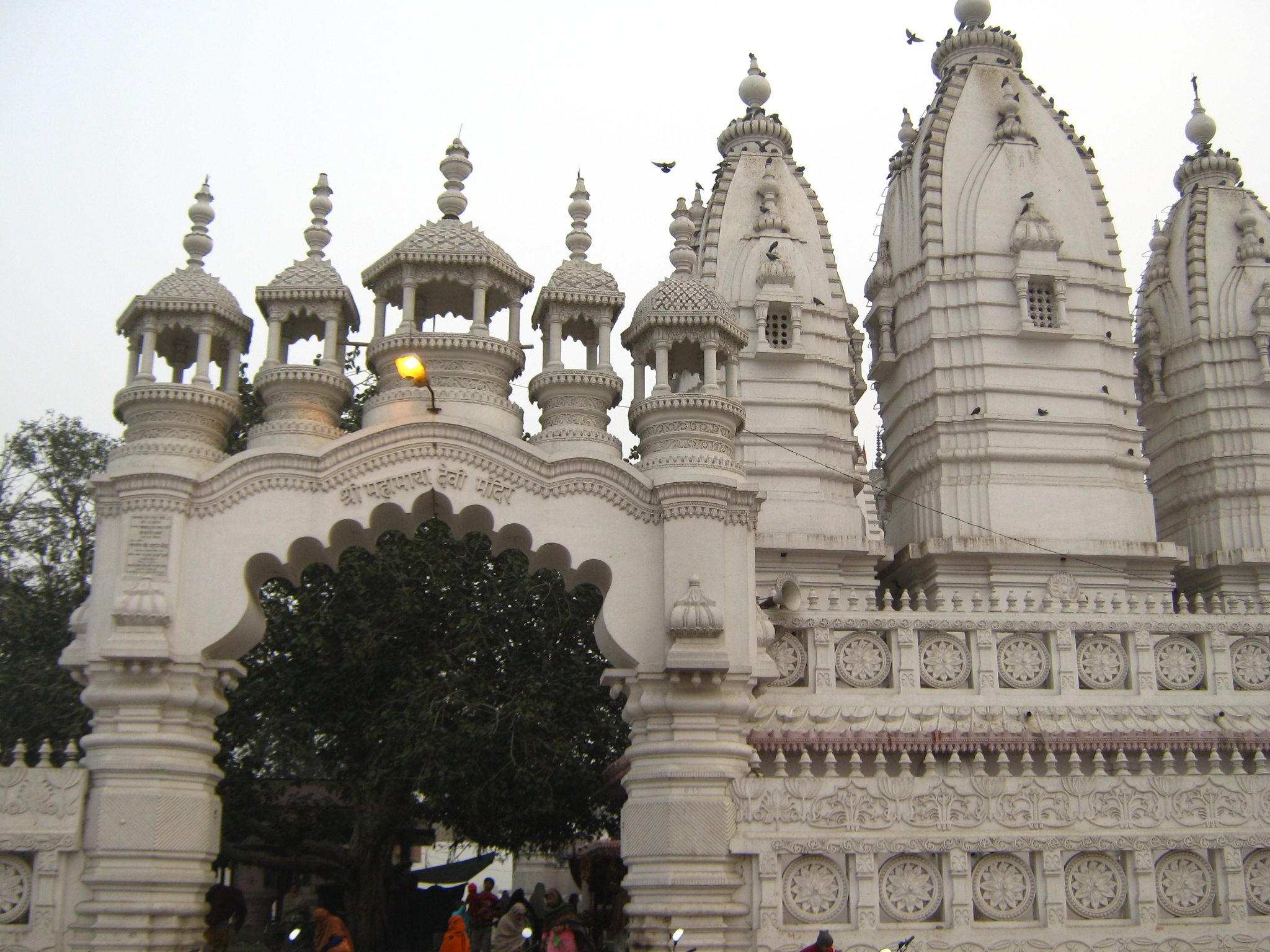
- Entrance to the temple

- Location within Uttar Pradesh

Religion
- Affiliation: Hinduism
- District: Ghaziabad
- Deity: Durga
- Festival: Navaratri

Location
- Location: Modinagar
- State: Uttar Pradesh
- Country: India
- Interactive map of Shri Mahamaya Devi Temple
- Coordinates: 28°48′52″N 77°34′12″E

Architecture
- Type: Hindu architecture
- Creator: Jalim Giri Baba
- Completed: 15th century

The Sikri Mata Temple (lit. 'Sikri Goddess Temple'), officially known as the Shri Mahamaya Devi Temple, is a Hindu temple at Sikri Khurd village, Ghaziabad district, Uttar Pradesh, India. The temple was built in the 15th century by Jalim Giri Baba and his family, who belonged to the Goswami community of the village. Its administration was taken over from the descendants of Giri Baba by the gram panchayat (transl. village council) in 1977. Dedicated to the goddess Sikri, who is believed to be an incarnation of Durga, the temple attracts large gatherings of visitors during the biannual festival of Navaratri. During the Chaitra month of Navaratri, marking the beginning of a new year on the Hindu calendar, a large historical fair is organised for nine days. The fair was cancelled in 2020 due to the COVID-19 pandemic for the first time since 1918. There is a banyan tree on the temple premises from which more than 130 revolutionaries were hanged to death during the Indian Rebellion of 1857.

== History ==
The Shri Mahamaya Devi Temple is located in Sikri Khurd village on the periphery of Modinagar city, Ghaziabad district, Uttar Pradesh.

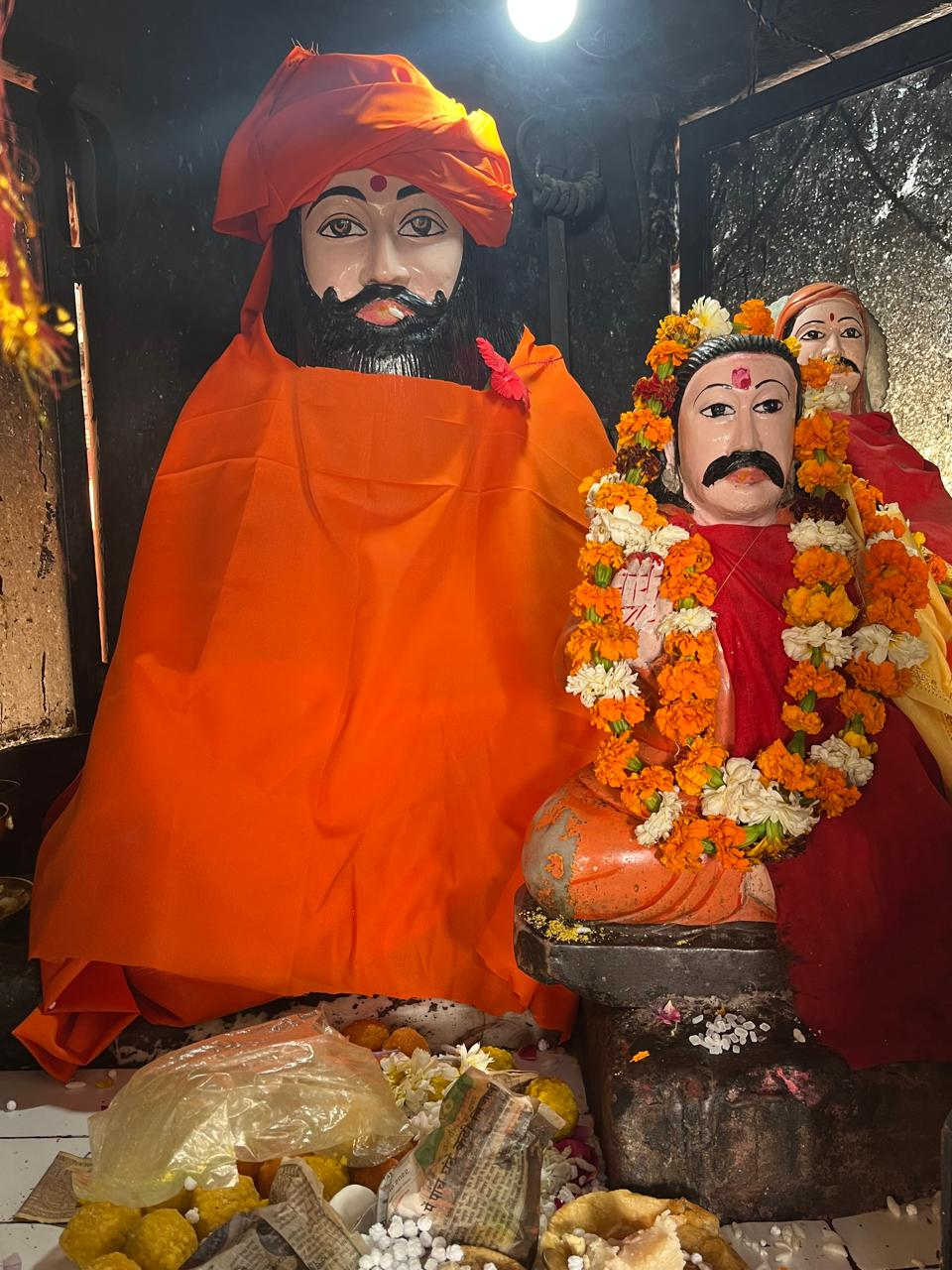
Jalim Giri Baba, the founder of the Mahamaya Temple

According to the Bhaat records (the Bhaats are people from Alwar, Rajasthan, who traditionally write and preserve family lineage and historical records of the Goswami community), the temple was originally constructed in 1532 CE, during the month of Pausha, on Shukla Paksha Navami, Saturday, at around 8:00 AM, during the reign of Badshah Humayun. The Bhaat documents further state that at the time of its construction, the temple measured 210 hands (hath) in length and 76 hands (hath) in width. There was also an ancient banyan tree (bargad) at the site during the temple’s construction, which still stands on the temple premises today. The temple complex had two entrances, one facing east and the other south, along with a well (kuwa) that was 32 hands (hath) deep.

Before the construction of the temple, Jalim Giri Baba, a hermit mahant from the Goswami community, lived at the site in a small hut. According to traditional belief, he experienced a divine darśana (holy vision) of Goddess Durga at this very place. The goddess instructed him to build a temple for her here. After sharing this spiritual revelation with his family and community, the temple was established.

=== Hanging of revolutionaries in 1857 ===
During the Indian Rebellion of 1857 against the rule of the British East India Company, many revolutionaries took shelter in the basement of the temple. A Company officer, Douglas, had the temple searched and the rebels dragged out of the basement. He then ordered their executions by hanging from the ancient banyan tree situated on the temple premises. More than 130 people were hanged to death and around 30 were shot to death. The tree is still present and pilgrims pay their tribute to it in remembrance of the martyrs.

== Administration ==
The temple was built by the Goswami community of Sikri village, and its administration was initially handled by the descendants of Jalim Giri Baba, who still live in the village. In 1977, the pradhan (transl. village council head) of the gram panchayat organized a separate temple management committee, and during that process also evicted the Goswami family and its administration from the temple. Before the takeover, all the offerings in the temple were deposited to the gram panchayat, including earnings from stallage related to the organization’s annual nine-day-long fair and funds donated for the Goswami family’s income. In 2024, the temple’s administration was taken over by the Nagar Nigam of Modinagar, and the gram panchayat no longer holds administrative rights over it.

== Temple deity ==
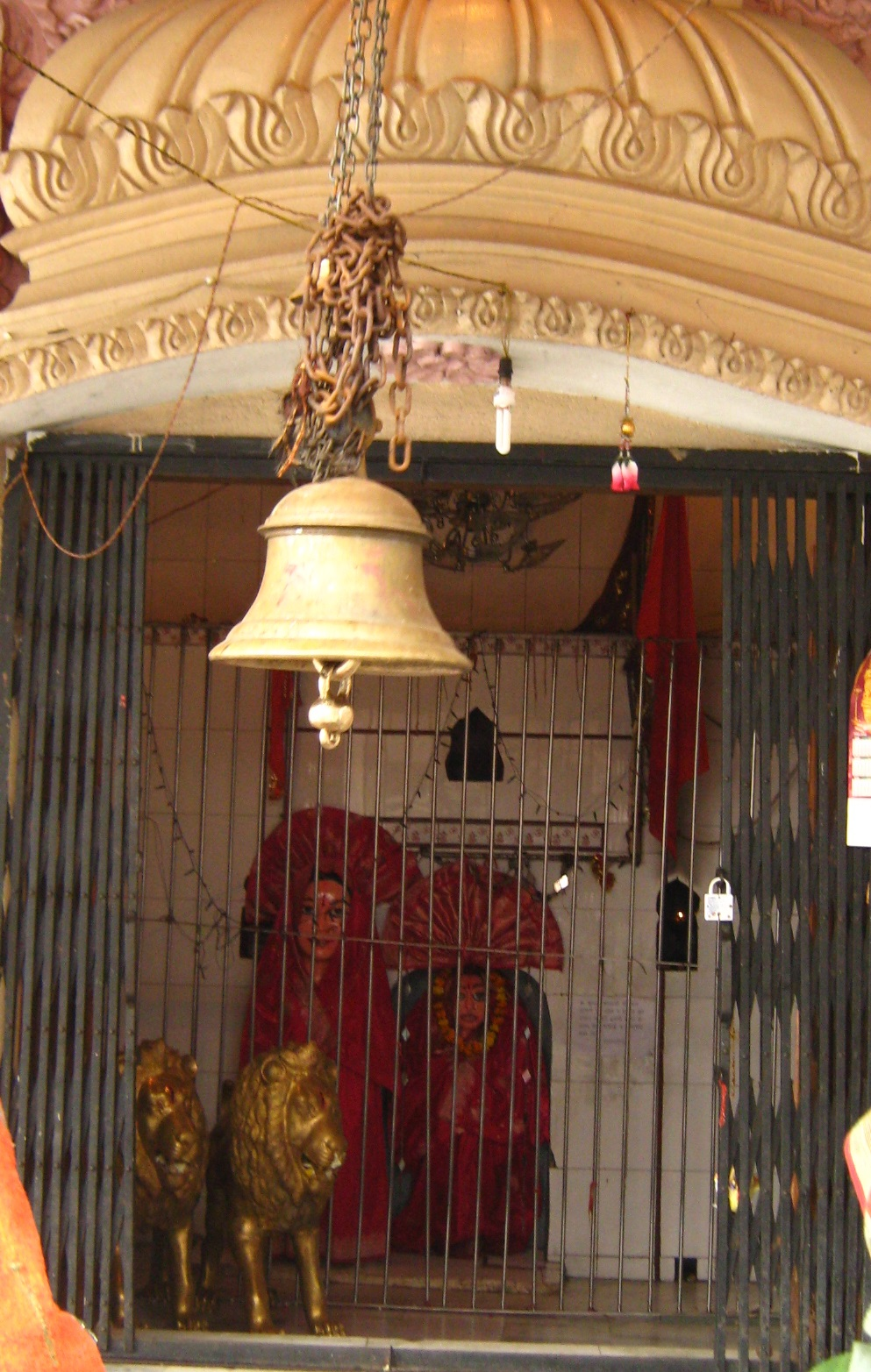
Idol of goddess Sikri in the garbhagriha

The sanctum sanctorum, garbhagriha, of the temple houses the murti of the primary deity of the temple, the goddess Sikri, who is believed to be an incarnation of the goddess Durga. The devotees of Sikri offer chunari, coconut, and prasāda of cardamom in the temple in her reverence. Idols of other Hindu gods and goddesses are also installed in the temple, which is common in most Hindu temples.

Animal sacrifice was a common practice in the temple until 1952 when some teachers of the village, including Aditya Goswami, Pandit Hari Dutt Ved, and their colleagues, protested against this ritual and had it banned. An akhand yagya (lit. 'unbroken yagya') is held continuously for three days—the sixth, seventh, and eighth days of the Chaitra month—every year at the place that was earlier used for sacrificing the animals, usually goats and roosters. However, live goats and liquor are still offered to the goddess with a belief that it will please her.

== Congregation ==
The temple attracts large numbers of devotees from Uttar Pradesh, Delhi, Haryana, Rajasthan, Uttarakhand, and Punjab. The Navaratri festivals in the months of Chaitra and Ashvin (Sharada) witness thousands of visitors attending the temple. Like other places of worship in the country, the temple was closed for visitors and its doors were sealed off by the district administration during the nationwide COVID-19 pandemic lockdown. Its doors were reopened on 9 June 2020 in the presence of a tehsildar who was sent as the representative of the Sub-Divisional Magistrate, representatives of gram panchayat, and Ghaziabad Police officials. The temple mahant (transl. chief priest) Sunil Kumar performed a special puja in the beginning of the door-opening ceremony.

== Navaratri fair ==
A large fair, the Devi Mela (lit. 'Goddess Fair'), is organised by the temple administration during the nine days of the Navaratri festival of the Chaitra month. Chaitra marks the beginning of the Hindu new year and coincides with the months of March and April on the Gregorian calendar. The fair is inaugurated on the first day of Chaitra usually by the Sub-Divisional Magistrate by breaking a coconut, which is considered auspicious in Hinduism. The district administration constructs a temporary bus stand for pilgrims at the boundary of the village during the fair, and frequent bus service is operated from there to nearby cities and states.

Due to the ongoing COVID-19 pandemic in Uttar Pradesh, the district administration was reluctant to permit the fair in 2020. A special meeting was held, attended by the Member of Uttar Pradesh Legislative Assembly from Modinagar Manju Shiwach, tehsildar Umakant Tiwari, and the representatives of gram panchayat on 21 March 2020. It was decided at the meeting that the fair would be cancelled for 2020 with the doors of the temple sealed to the public; however, priests would be allowed to carry on the daily rituals inside the temple. The last time the fair was not organised was during the 1918 flu pandemic in India, when then-mahant of the temple Swami Aditya Goswami decided to close the doors of the temple and postpone the fair to the next year.

=== Security during the festival ===
The temple is provided with security by Uttar Pradesh Police during all nine days of the Navratri festival, with senior officials of both police and district civil administration maintaining a continuous presence because of the large gathering that the temple attracts during these days. Sixteen surveillance cameras have been installed on the temple premises. Door-frame and hand-held metal detectors are used and a dog squad of the Ghaziabad police is deployed especially during the Navaratri fair.

== See also ==
- Nandmahar Dham
