= Fatehpur, Kapurthala =

Fatehpur
- Village
- Location in Punjab, India Fatehpur (India)
- Coordinates: 30.826403°N 76.484504°E
- Country: India
- State: Punjab
- District: Kapurthala

Government
  - Type: Panchayati raj (India)
  - Body: Gram panchayat

Population (2011)
  - Total: 409
- Sex ratio 213/196♂/♀

Languages
  - Official: Punjabi
  - Other spoken: Hindi
- Time zone: UTC+5:30 (IST)
- PIN: 144106
- Telephone code: 01822
- ISO 3166 code: IN-PB
- Vehicle registration: PB-09
- Website: kapurthala.gov.in

Fatehpur is a village in fatehpur bhullowala of Punjab State, India. It is located 14 kilometres (8.7 mi) from Kapurthala, which is both district and sub-district headquarters of Fatehpur. The village is administrated by a Sarpanch, who is an elected representative.

== Demography ==
According to the report published by Census India in 2011, Fatehpur has a total number of 69 houses and population of 409 of which include 213 males and 196 females. Literacy rate of Fatehpur is 67.89%, lower than state average of 75.84%. The population of children under the age of 6 years is 54 which is 13.20% of total population of Fatehpur, and child sex ratio is approximately 636, lower than state average of 846.

As per census 2011, 208 people were engaged in work activities out of the total population of Fatehpur which includes 115 males and 93 females. According to census survey report 2011, 97.12% workers describe their work as main work and 2.88% workers are involved in Marginal activity providing livelihood for less than 6 months.

== Population data ==
Particulars	Total	Male	Female
Total No. of Houses	69	-	-
Population	409	213	196
Child (0-6)	54	33	21
Schedule Caste	293	155	138
Schedule Tribe	0	0	0
Literacy	67.89%	70.56%	65.14%
Total Workers	208	115	93
Main Worker	202	0	0
Marginal Worker	6	5	1

== Caste ==
The village has schedule caste (SC) constitutes 71.64% of total population of the village and it doesn't have any Schedule Tribe (ST) population.

== Air travel connectivity ==
The closest airport to the village is Sri Guru Ram Dass Jee International Airport.
