= Sikri, St. Kabir Nagar =

Sikri
- village
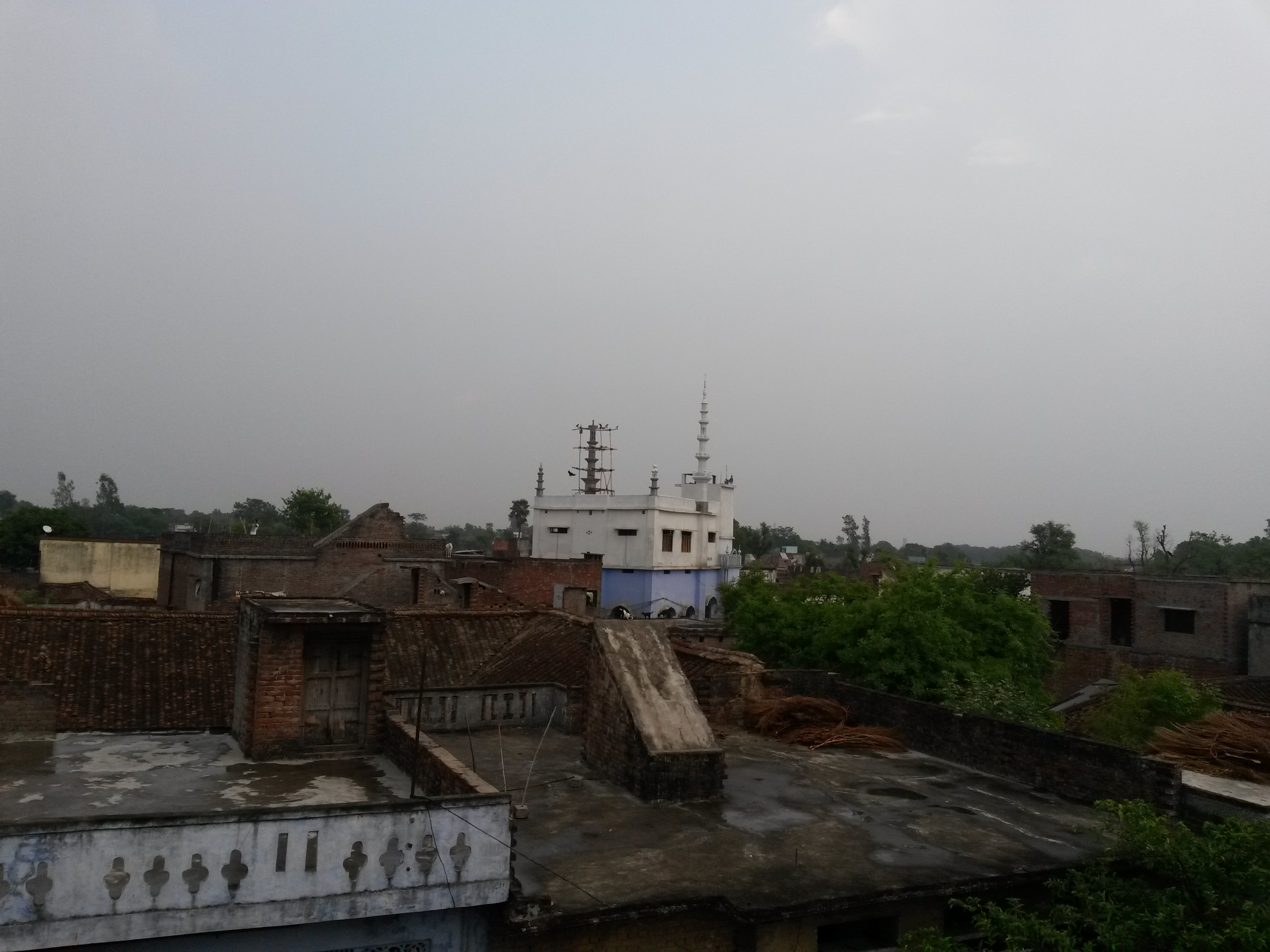

- Location in Uttar Pradesh, India Sikri (India)
- Coordinates: 27.078153°N 83.061424°E
- Country: India
- State: Uttar Pradesh
- District: Sant Kabir Nagar

Government
  - Type: Sarpanch
  - Body: Gram panchayat Sikri
  - Sarpanch: abulass khan

Population (2011)
  - Total: 1,811
- Demonym: Sikarwi

Languages
  - Official: Urdu, Hindi
  - Spoken: Awadhi-Bhojpuri Mixture
- Time zone: UTC+5:30 (IST)
- PIN: 272154
- Vehicle registration: UP 58
- Lok Sabha constituency: Sant Kabir Nagar
- Vidhan Sabha constituency: Mehdawal

Sikri is a village and gram panchayat located in the Sant Kabir Nagar district of Uttar Pradesh state, India.

Bansi, Naugarh, Mehdawal, Khalilabad and Gorakhpur are the nearby cities to Sikri.

== Demographics ==
As of 2011 India census Sikri had a population of 1,811. Males constituted 913 of the population and females 898. Sikri has an average literacy rate of 50.96% lower than state average of 67.68%. Male literacy is 59.19% and female literacy is 43.03%. In Sikri 19.82% of the population is under 6 years of age.
