= Fatehpur (Gujrat) =

Coordinates: 32°41′41.1″N 74°07′52.8″E

Fatehpur فتح پور
- Interactive map of Fatehpur
- Country: Pakistan
- Province: Punjab
- District: Gujrat
- Time zone: UTC+5 (PST)
- +92: 053

Fatehpur (Urdu: فتح پور) is a village located in district of Gujrat, in the Punjab province of Pakistan.

== History ==
Hierarchy of the Zulfiqars
