= Fatehpur, Bhopal =

Fatehpur
- village
- Location within Madhya Pradesh Location within India
- Coordinates: 23.3899983°N 77.4730653°E
- Country: India
- State: Madhya Pradesh
- District: Bhopal
- Tehsil: Huzur
- Elevation: 475 m (1,558 ft)

Population (2011)
  - Total: 371
- Time zone: UTC+5:30 (IST)
- ISO 3166 code: MP-IN
- 2011 census code: 482406

Fatehpur is a village in the Bhopal district of Madhya Pradesh, India. It is located in the Huzur tehsil and the Phanda block.

== Demographics ==
According to the 2011 census of India, Fatehpur has 78 households. The effective literacy rate (i.e. the literacy rate of population excluding children aged 6 and below) is 55.7%.

Demographics (2011 Census)
	Total	Male	Female
Population	371	193	178
Children aged below 6 years	55	26	29
Scheduled caste	52	27	25
Scheduled tribe	64	33	31
Literates	176	106	70
Workers (all)	199	120	79
Main workers (total)	193	118	75
Main workers: Cultivators	28	20	8
Main workers: Agricultural labourers	162	96	66
Main workers: Household industry workers	1	1	0
Main workers: Other	2	1	1
Marginal workers (total)	6	2	4
Marginal workers: Cultivators	0	0	0
Marginal workers: Agricultural labourers	5	1	4
Marginal workers: Household industry workers	0	0	0
Marginal workers: Others	1	1	0
Non-workers	172	73	99
