= Fatehpur (Kasur) =

- Town
- Location within Pakistan
- Coordinates: 30°56′56″N 73°44′36″E
- Country: Pakistan
- Province: Punjab
- District: Kasur
- Time zone: UTC+5 (PST)

Fatehpur (Urdu: فتح پُور) is a town and Union Council of Kasur District in the Punjab Pakistan. It is a part of Kasur Tehsil and is located at 31°1'14N 74°19'53E with an altitude of 173 metres (570 feet).

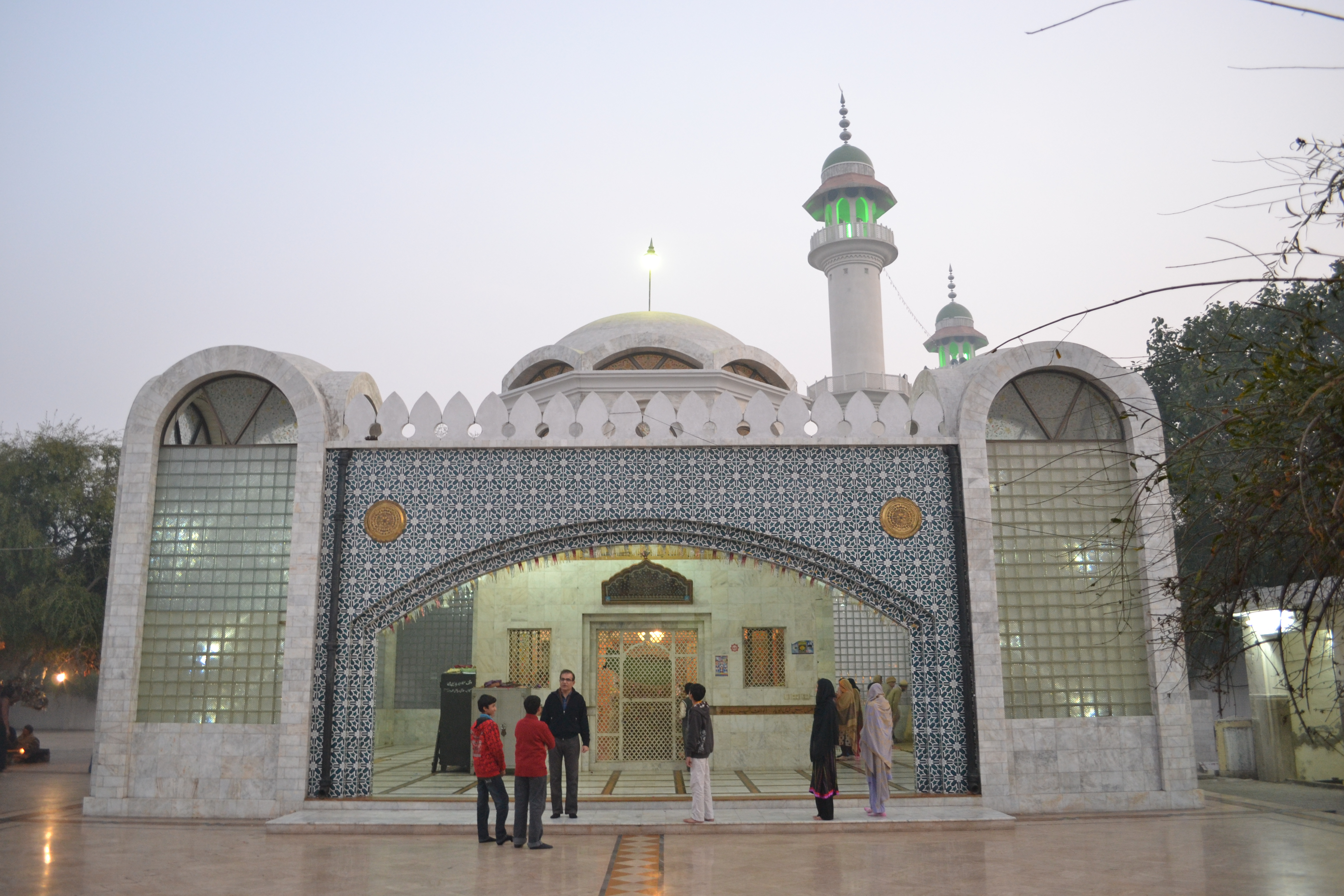
The shrine of Bulleh Shah in Fatehpur
