= Fatehpur, Jalandhar district =

Fatehpur
- Village
- Country: India
- State: Punjab
- District: Jalandhar
- Tehsil: Shahkot

Government
  - Type: Panchayat raj
  - Body: Gram panchayat

Area
  - Total: 183 ha (450 acres)

Population (2011)
  - Total: 719; 359/360 ♂/♀
  - Scheduled Castes: 343; 173/170 ♂/♀
  - Total Households: 139

Languages
  - Official: Punjabi
- Time zone: UTC+5:30 (IST)
- ISO 3166 code: IN-PB
- Website: jalandhar.gov.in

Fatehpur is a village in Shahkot in Jalandhar district of Punjab State, India. It is located 14 kilometres (8.7 mi) from sub district headquarter and 28 kilometres (17 mi) from district headquarter. The village is administrated by Sarpanch an elected representative of the village.

== Demography ==
As of 2011, the village has a total number of 139 houses and a population of 719 of which 359 are males while 360 are females. According to the report published by Census India in 2011, out of the total population of the village 343 people are from Schedule Caste and the village does not have any Schedule Tribe population so far.

== See also ==
- List of villages in India
