= Alipur =

Alipur may refer to the following places:

== Bangladesh ==
- Alipur, Jhalokati
- Alipur, Netrokona

== India ==
- Alipur, Bihar
- Alipur, Chanditala-I
- Alipur, Delhi
- Alipur, Jaynagar
- Alipur, Karnataka
- Alipur, Kapurthala
- Alipur, Ludhiana
- Alipur, Malda
- Alipur, Raebareli, a village in Uttar Pradesh, India
- Alipur, Purba Bardhaman
- Alipore, South Kolkata
- Alipore, Navsari

== Pakistan ==
- Alipur Chatha, Gujranwala District
- Alipur, Punjab, Pakistan
- Alipur Tehsil
- Alipur Farash

== See also ==
- Alinagar (disambiguation)
- Aliabad (disambiguation)
- Alipurduar, West Bengal, India
  - Alipurduar (Lok Sabha constituency)
- Aligarh, a city in Uttar Pradesh, India
- Aliganj, a town in Uttar Pradesh, India
  - Aliganj (Assembly constituency)
- Aliganj, Raebareli, a village in Uttar Pradesh, India
