= Domapur =

Domapur Domāpur
- Village
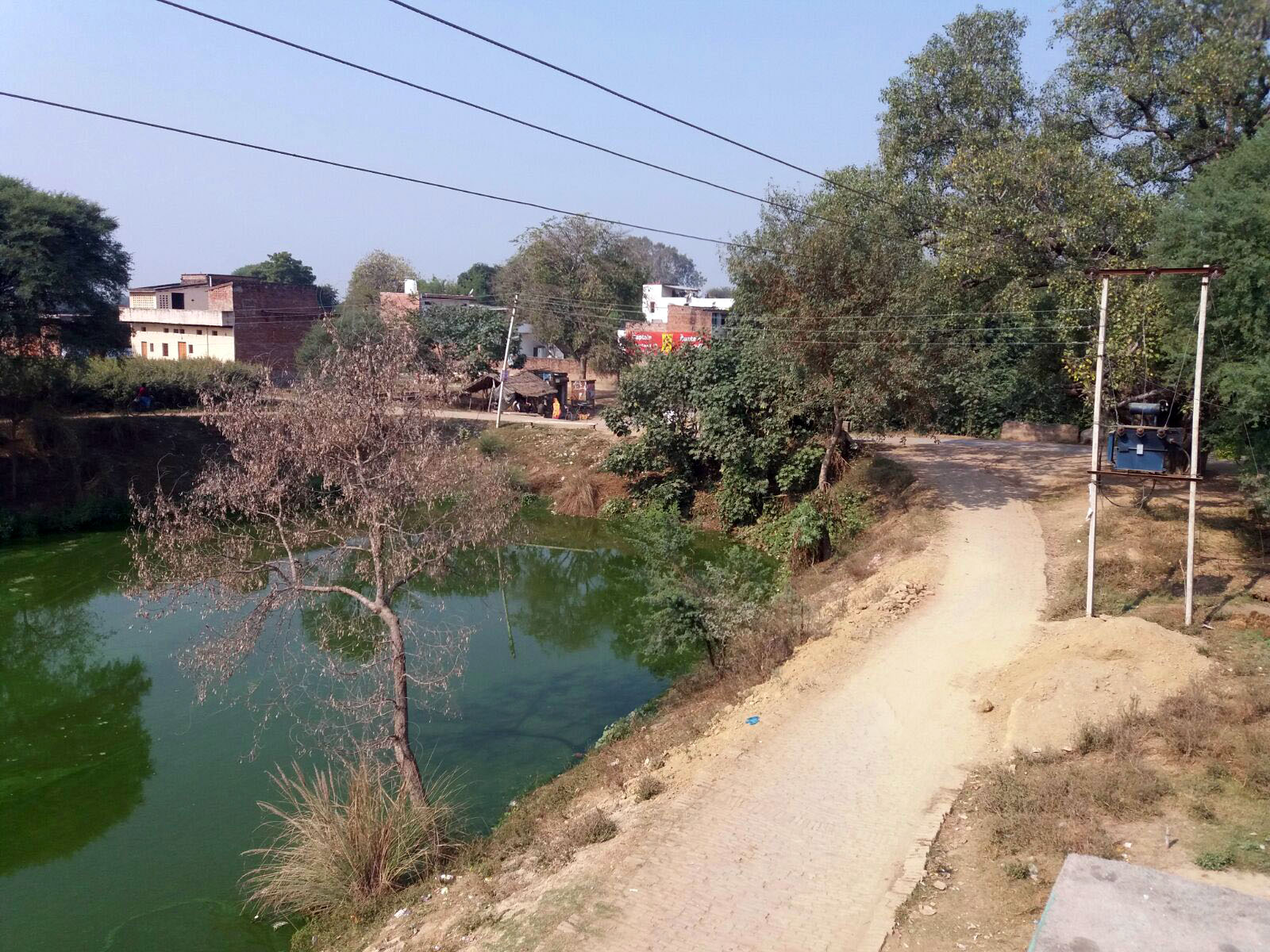

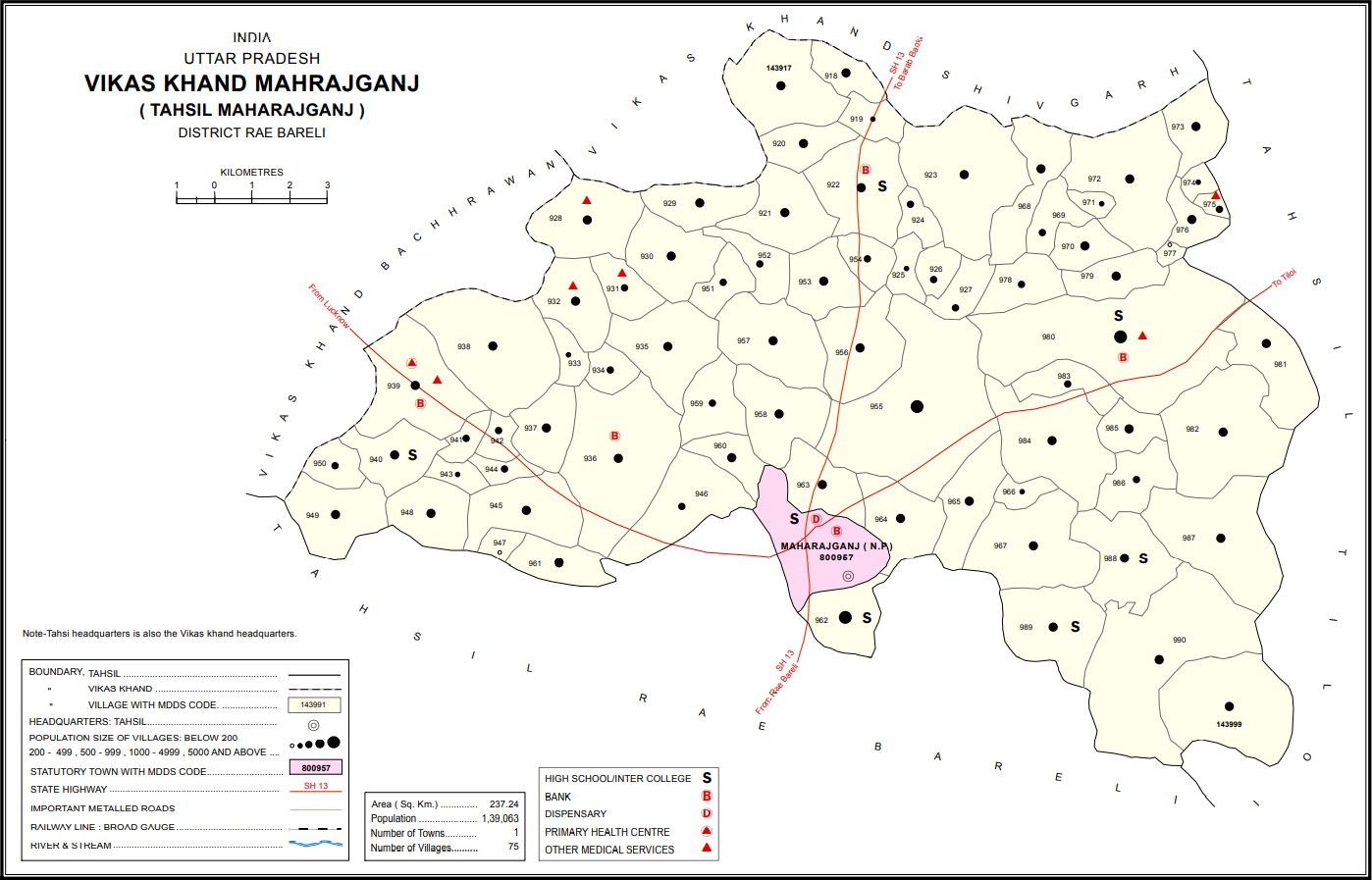
- Map showing Domapur (#988) in Maharajganj CD block

- Location in Uttar Pradesh, India
- Coordinates: 26.37401°N 81.356143°E
- Country: India
- State: Uttar Pradesh
- District: Raebareli

Area
  - Total: 3.679 km^{2} (1.420 sq mi)

Population (2011)
  - Total: 2,254
  - Density: 612.7/km^{2} (1,587/sq mi)

Languages
  - Official: Hindi
- Time zone: UTC+5:30 (IST)
- Vehicle registration: UP-35

Domapur is a village in Maharajganj block of Raebareli district, Uttar Pradesh, India. As of 2011, its population is 2,254, in 404 households. It has two primary schools and no healthcare facilities. It is located 10 km from Maharajganj, the block headquarters. The main staple foods are wheat and rice. It belongs to the nyaya panchayat of Chandapur.

The 1951 census recorded Domapur (as "Domanpur") as comprising 7 hamlets, with a total population of 904 people (473 male and 431 female), in 83 households and 74 physical houses. The area of the village was given as 950 acres. 28 residents were literate, 26 male and 2 female. The village was listed as belonging to the pargana of Simrauta and the thana of Maharajganj.

The 1961 census recorded Domapur (as "Domanpur") as comprising 7 hamlets, with a total population of 1,036 people (520 male and 516 female), in 209 households and 200 physical houses. The area of the village was given as 950 acres.

The 1981 census recorded Domapur (as "Domanpur") as having a population of 1,419 people, in 273 households, and having an area of 381.22 hectares.

The 1991 census recorded Domapur as having a total population of 1,647 people (854 male and 793 female), in 309 households and 309 physical houses. The area of the village was listed as 379 hectares. Members of the 0-6 age group numbered 339, or 21% of the total; this group was 53% male (178) and 47% female (161). Members of scheduled castes made up 31% of the village's population, while no members of scheduled tribes were recorded. The literacy rate of the village was 14% (171 men and 53 women). 464 people were classified as main workers (448 men and 16 women), while 319 people were classified as marginal workers (10 men and 309 women); the remaining 864 residents were non-workers. The breakdown of main workers by employment category was as follows: 355 cultivators (i.e. people who owned or leased their own land); 63 agricultural labourers (i.e. people who worked someone else's land in return for payment); 2 workers in livestock, forestry, fishing, hunting, plantations, orchards, etc.; 0 in mining and quarrying; 7 household industry workers; 5 workers employed in other manufacturing, processing, service, and repair roles; 0 construction workers; 18 employed in trade and commerce; 0 employed in transport, storage, and communications; and 14 in other services.
