= Alinagar =

Alinagar ("Ali city" in Indic languages) may refer to several places:

- A short-lived name during the history of Kolkata, India, set in 1756 by the Bengali ruler Siraj ud-Daulah.
  - Treaty of Alinagar, signed in Kolkata in 1757
- Alinagar (Vidhan Sabha constituency), an electoral district in Bihar, India.
- Alinagar, a union council in Beanibazar Upazila, Bangladesh.
- Ali Nagar Roda, a village in Punjab, Pakistan.
- Ali Nagar Pali, a village in Bihar, India.
- Alinagar, a village in Jinnaram Mendal, Medak district, Telangana, India.
- Alinagar, a village in Aonla, Uttar Pradesh, India

== See also ==
- Alipur (disambiguation)
- Aliabad (disambiguation)
