= Muhibullah =

Muhibullah, also spelled Mohebullah, Mohibullah, Mohibbullah, and in other ways, is a masculine Muslim given name meaning God lover. It may refer to:

- Muhibullah Allahabadi, Indian Sufi poet and scholar
- Muhibbullah Babunagari (born 1934), Bangladeshi Islamic scholar
- Muhibullah Bihari (died 1707), an Indian Islamic scholar
- Moheb Ullah Borekzai (born 1982), Afghan held in Guantanamo
- Muhibbullah Lari Nadwi (1917 – 1993), Indian Islamic scholar
- Mohibullah "Mo" Khan (died 1995), Pakistani squash player
- Mohibullah Khan, Pakistani squash player (not the same as the one above)
- Mohibbullah Nadvi (born 1976), Indian Islamic scholar and politician
- Mohibullah Samim (born 1965), Afghan provincial governor
- Muhibullo Abdulkarim Umarov (born 1980), Tajik held in Guantanamo
- Muhebullah (Guantanamo detainee 974) (born c. 1981), Afghan

== See also ==
- Mohib Ullah (1971–2021), Rohingya peace activist murdered in 2021
