= Hasanpur (disambiguation) =

Hasanpur is a city in Uttar Pradesh, India.

Hasanpur may also refer to:

- Hasanpur, Uttar Pradesh Assembly constituency, in the city of Hasanpur
- Hasanpur, Bihar Assembly constituency, in Samastipur district, Bihar, India
- Hasanpur, Delhi, a village in Nangla, Delhi, India
- Hassanpur (Ludhiana West), a village located in the Ludhiana West tehsil, of Ludhiana district, Punjab
- Hasanpur, Maharajganj, Raebareli, a village Uttar Pradesh, India
- Hasanpur, Singhpur, Raebareli, a village in Uttar Pradesh, India
- Hasanpur, Nepal, a village development committee in Bhojpur District, Kosi Zone, Nepal
- Hasanpur, Mansehra, a small village in Khyber Pakhtunkhwa Province, Pakistan
- Hassanpur, a town in Palwal district, Haryana
