= Rajapur Kanspur =

Rajapur Kanspur Rājapur Kanspur
- Village
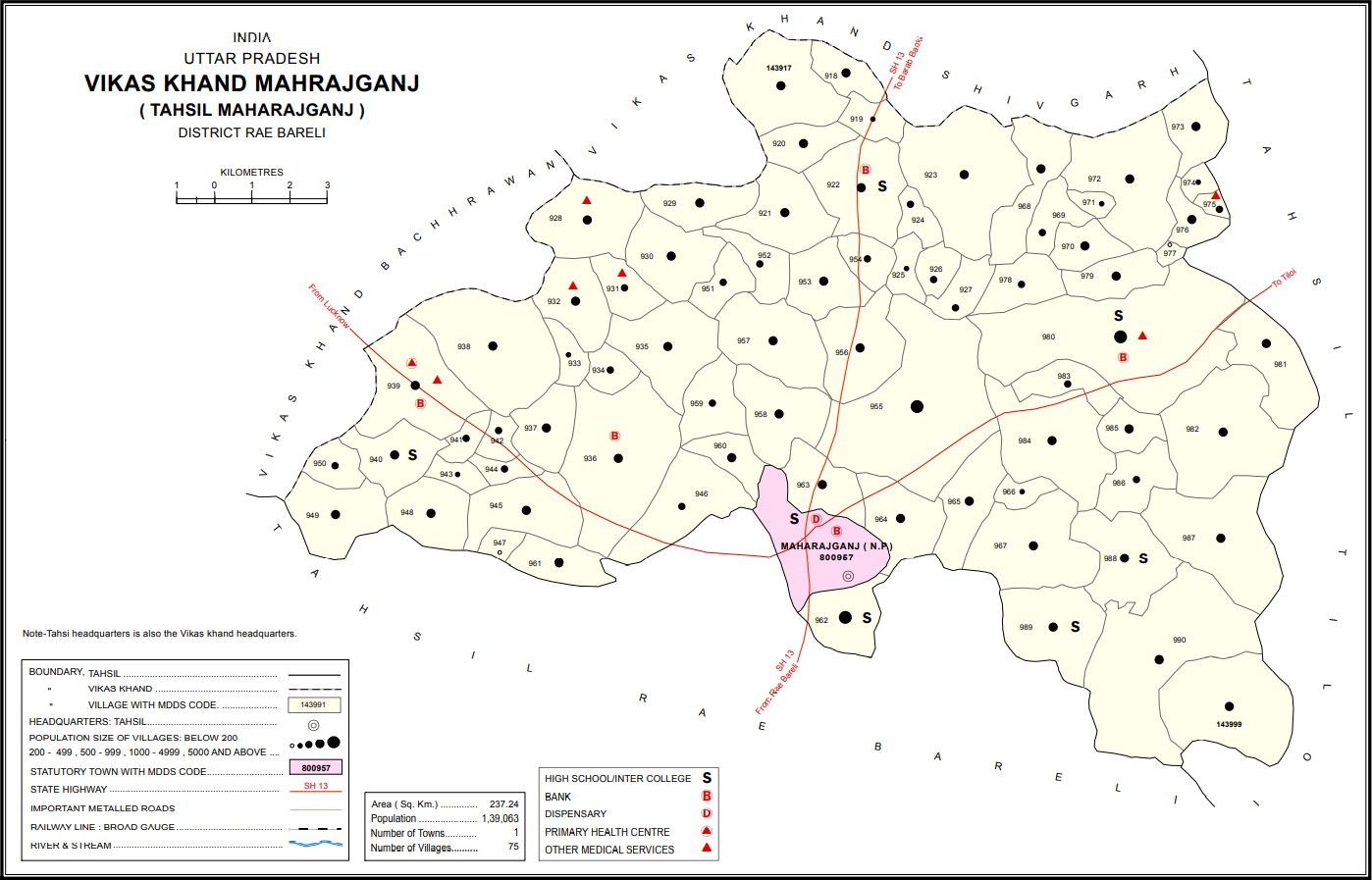
- Map showing Rajapur Kanspur (#954) in Maharajganj CD block

- Location in Uttar Pradesh, India
- Coordinates: 26.44582°N 81.288872°E
- Country India: India
- State: Uttar Pradesh
- District: Raebareli

Area
  - Total: 1.30 km^{2} (0.50 sq mi)

Population (2011)
  - Total: 964
  - Density: 742/km^{2} (1,920/sq mi)

Languages
  - Official: Hindi
- Time zone: UTC+5:30 (IST)
- Vehicle registration: UP-35

Rajapur Kanspur is a village in Maharajganj block of Rae Bareli district, Uttar Pradesh, India. As of 2011, its population is 964, in 160 households. It has one primary school and no healthcare facilities. It is located 9 km from Maharajganj, the block headquarters. The main staple foods are wheat and rice.

The 1961 census recorded Rajapur Kanspur as comprising 2 hamlets, with a total population of 422 people (216 male and 206 female), in 101 households and 99 physical houses. The area of the village was given as 337 acres.

The 1981 census recorded Rajapur Kanspur as having a population of 476 people, in 105 households, and having an area of 135.98 hectares.
