= Muraini =

- Village
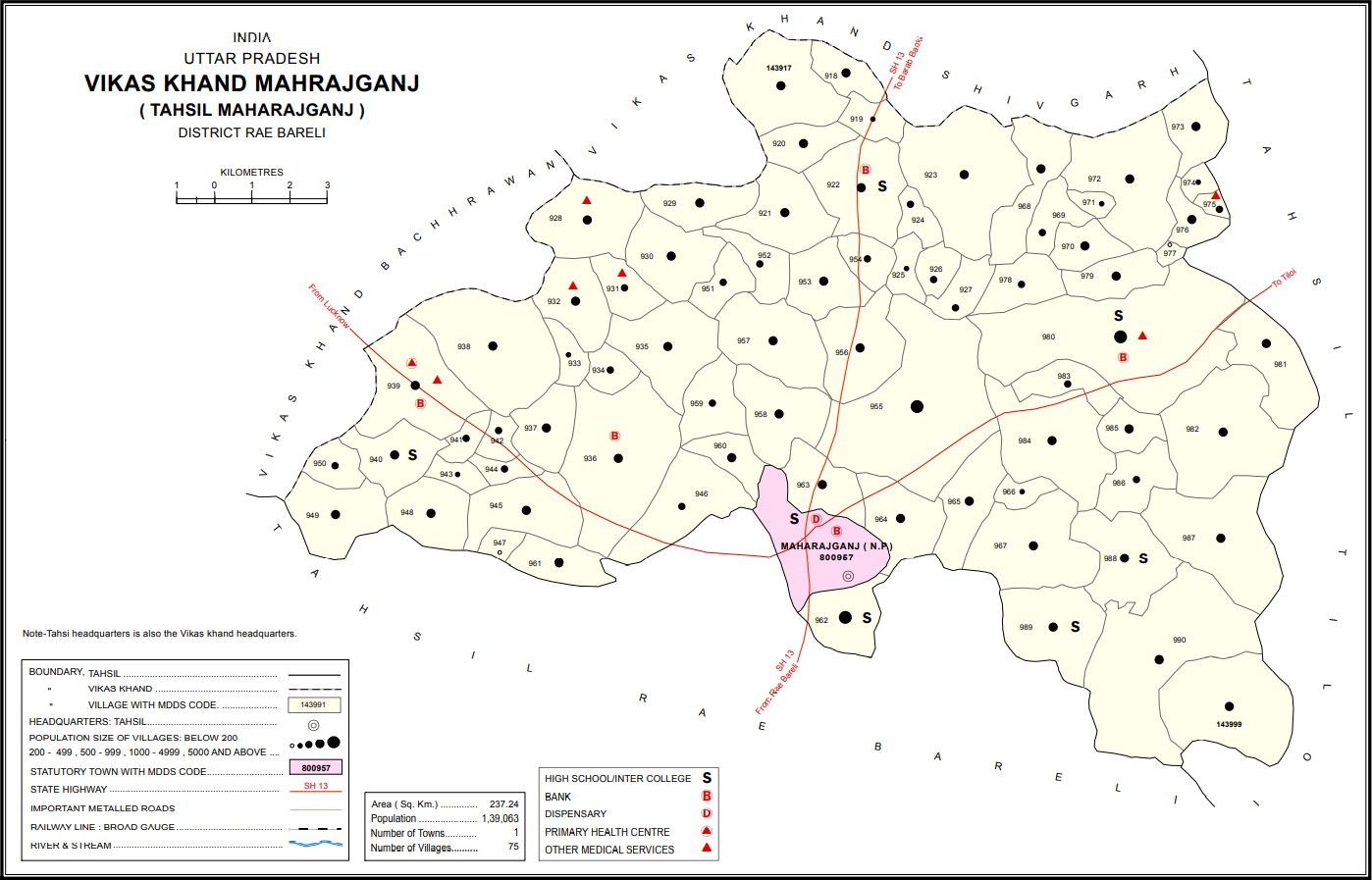
- Map showing Muraini (#984) in Maharajganj CD block

- Location in Uttar Pradesh, India
- Coordinates: 26.408888°N 81.343364°E
- Country India: India
- State: Uttar Pradesh
- District: Raebareli

Area
  - Total: 6.208 km^{2} (2.397 sq mi)

Population (2011)
  - Total: 3,028
  - Density: 487.8/km^{2} (1,263/sq mi)

Languages
  - Official: Hindi
- Time zone: UTC+5:30 (IST)
- Vehicle registration: UP-35

Muraini is a village in Maharajganj block of Rae Bareli district, Uttar Pradesh, India. As of 2011, its population is 3,028, in 545 households. It has one primary school and no healthcare facilities. It is located 8 km from Maharajganj, the block headquarters. The main staple foods are wheat and gram.

The 1961 census recorded Muraini as comprising 9 hamlets, with a total population of 1,367 people (690 male and 677 female), in 291 households and 278 physical houses. The area of the village was given as 1,456 acres.

The 1981 census recorded Muraini as having a population of 1,746 people, in 348 households, and having an area of 623.32 hectares.
