= Simrauta =

Semrauta
- Village
- Nickname: Semrauta
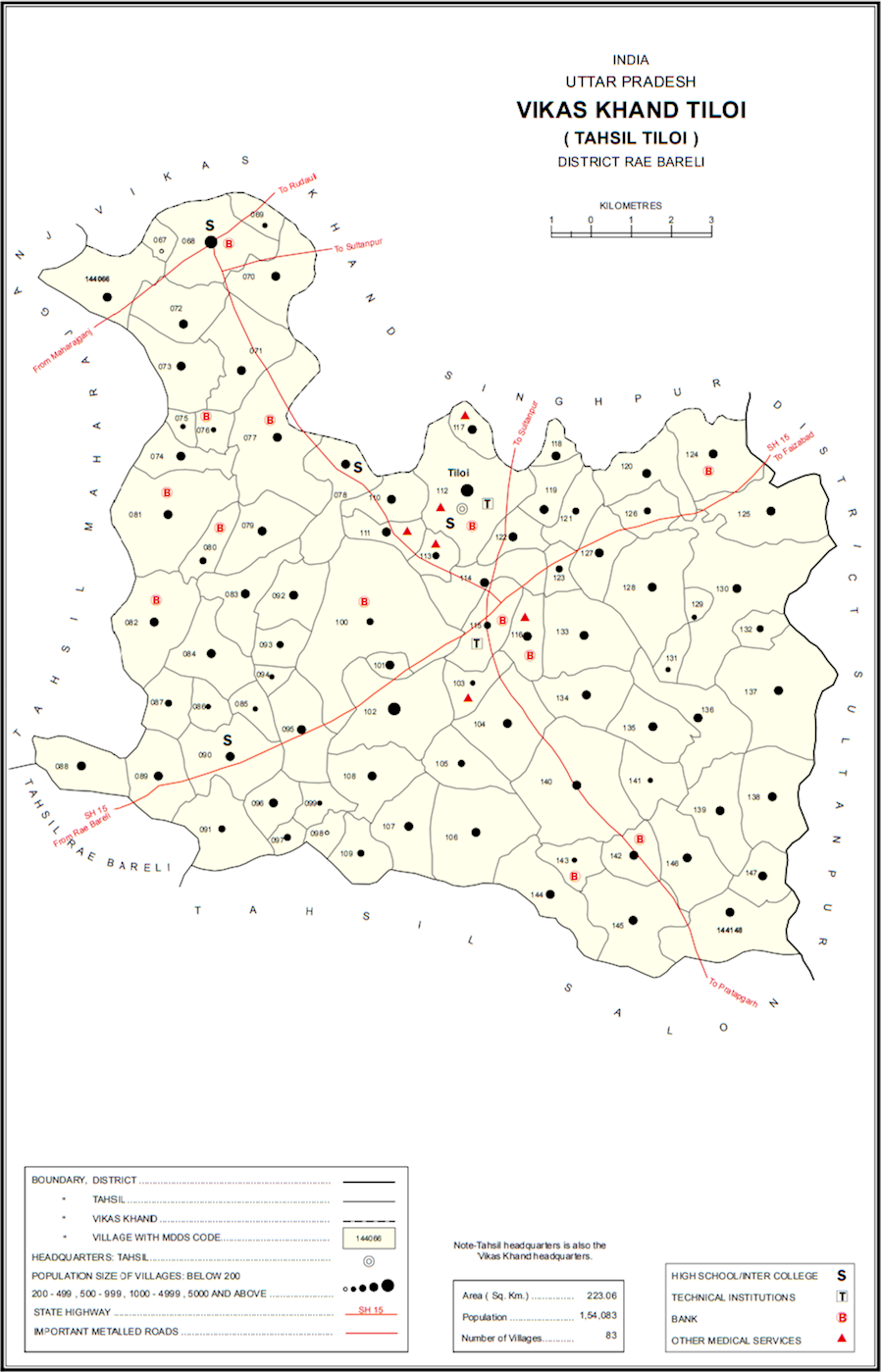
- Map showing Semrauta (#068) in Tiloi CD block

- Location in Uttar Pradesh, India
- Coordinates: 26.455122°N 81.413675°E
- Country India: India
- State: Uttar Pradesh
- District: Raebareli

Area
  - Total: 6.172 km^{2} (2.383 sq mi)

Population (2011)
  - Total: 6,243
  - Density: 1,012/km^{2} (2,620/sq mi)

Languages
  - Official: Hindi
- Time zone: UTC+5:30 (IST)
- PIN: 229126
- Vehicle registration: UP-36

Semrauta is a village in Tiloi block of Rae Bareli district, Uttar Pradesh, India. It is located at the intersection of the Maharajganj-Inhauna and Mohanganj-Haidargarh roads, about 20 km from Maharajganj, the tehsil headquarters. Although now eclipsed by Maharajganj, Semrauta was historically a relatively important village that served as the headquarters of a pargana and the capital of a branch of the Kanhpuria Rajputs, who later became known as the Rajas of Chandapur. As of 2011, the population of Simrauta is 6,423, in 1,031 households.

Semrauta hosts a Dhanush Yagya festival annually on Agrahayana Sudi 15. It is dedicated to worship of Rama. Vendors bring sweets, toys, and everyday items to sell at the fair. Siemrauta also hosts a general market twice per week, on Wednesdays and Sundays.

== History ==
Semrauta was historically the seat of a pargana. At the time of Akbar in the late 1500s, the area that would later form the pargana was then split between the mahals of Jais (in the sarkar of Manikpur) and Subeha (in the sarkar of Awadh).

Simrauta was also the seat of a taluqdari estate held by a branch of the Kanhpuria Rajputs. According to tradition, five generations after the original Kanhpuria conquest of the region, the clan's territories were divided between three brothers: Janga Singh, the oldest, received Tiloi; Man Singh, the second-oldest, received Atheha (in today's Pratapgarh district), and Madan Singh, the youngest, received Simrauta. For several generations, basically nothing is known about the Simrauta branch. The sixth-generation descendant, Jagat Singh, supposedly was in good standing with the Mughal emperor. The Simrauta estate was later divided between the brothers Mandhata Singh and Jaswant Singh, who were Jagat Singh's grandsons and contemporaries of Saadat Ali Khan I, the first Nawab of Awadh. Mandhata Singh received Simrauta, while his younger brother Jaswant Singh founded the Siwan estate. Mandhata Singh was in good standing with the Nawab, and was given a mansab of 7,000. At some point, the Simrauta taluqdars shifted their main residence to Chandapur.

At the turn of the 20th century, Simrauta was described as a mostly agricultural village with a small market. Maharajganj had overtaken it by that point. It had a large primary school and belonged to the Raja of Chandapur, who had a residence on the east side of the village. Simrauta's population in 1901 was 2,886 people, including a large proportion of Brahmins.

The 1961 census recorded Simrauta (under the spelling "Semrauta") as comprising 8 hamlets, with a total population of 2,573 people (1,297 male and 1,276 female), in 573 households and 565 physical houses. The area of the village was given as 1,560 acres and it had a post office at the time. Average attendance of the annual Dhanush Yagya festival was then about 1,000 people, while average attendance of the twice-weekly market was about 100.

The 1981 census recorded Simrauta (again as "Semrauta") as having a population of 2,897 people, in 706 households, and having an area of 631.31 hectares.
