= Ramgaon, Raebareli =

Ramgaon Rāmgāon
- Village
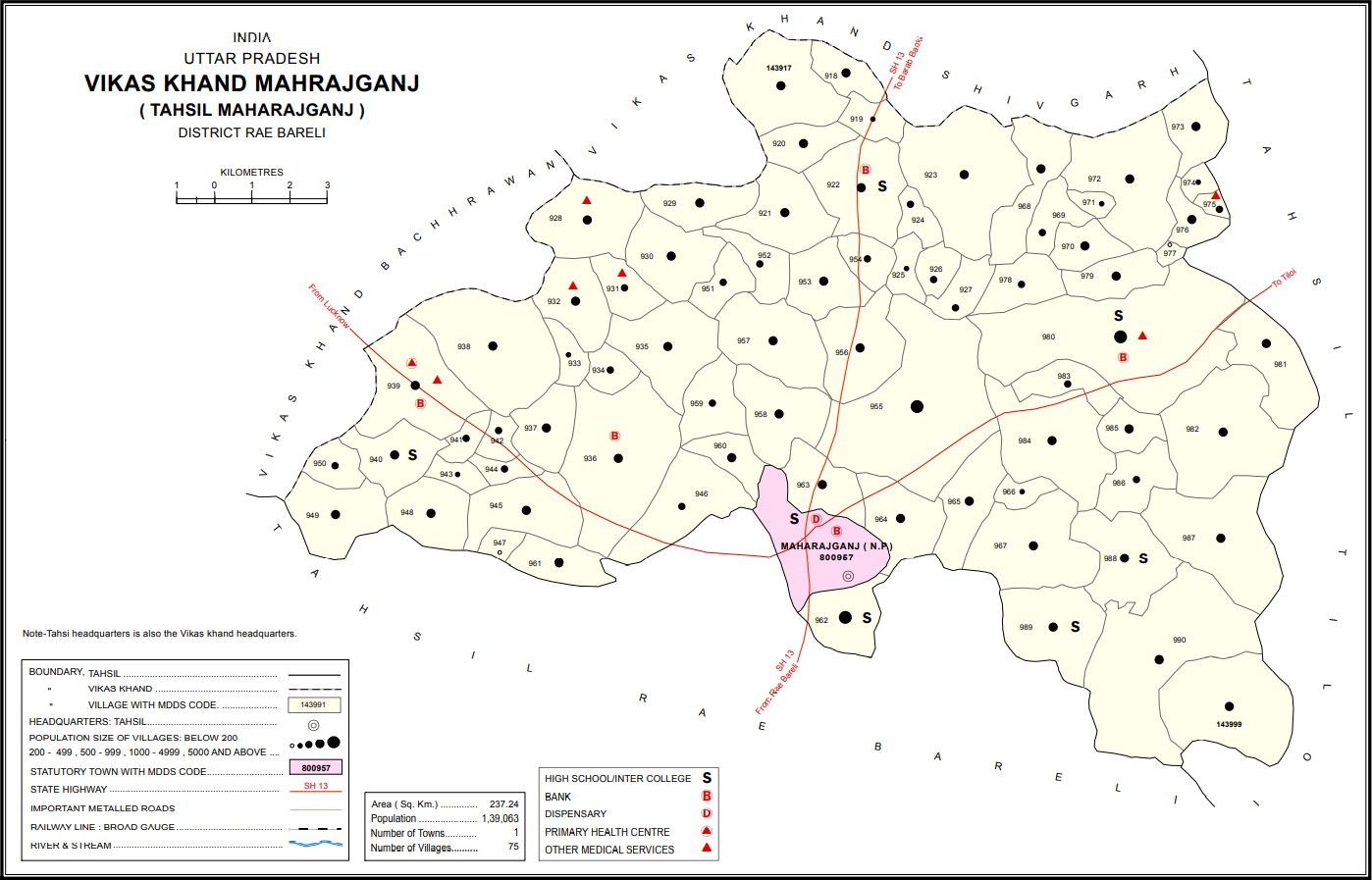
- Map showing Ramgaon (#931) in Maharajganj CD block

- Location in Uttar Pradesh, India
- Coordinates: 26.442059°N 81.228545°E
- Country India: India
- State: Uttar Pradesh
- District: Raebareli

Area
  - Total: 1.596 km^{2} (0.616 sq mi)

Population (2011)
  - Total: 978
  - Density: 613/km^{2} (1,590/sq mi)

Languages
  - Official: Hindi
- Time zone: UTC+5:30 (IST)
- Vehicle registration: UP-35

Ramgaon is a village in Maharajganj block of Rae Bareli district, Uttar Pradesh, India. As of 2011, its population is 978, in 163 households. It is located 8 km from Maharajganj, the block headquarters. The main staple foods are wheat and rice.

The 1961 census recorded Ramgaon as comprising 4 hamlets, with a total population of 417 people (231 male and 186 female), in 50 households and 48 physical houses. The area of the village was given as 417 acres.

The 1981 census recorded Ramgaon as having a population of 555 people, in 212 households, and having an area of 168.75 hectares.
