= Para Kalan =

Para Kalan Pāra Kalān
- Village
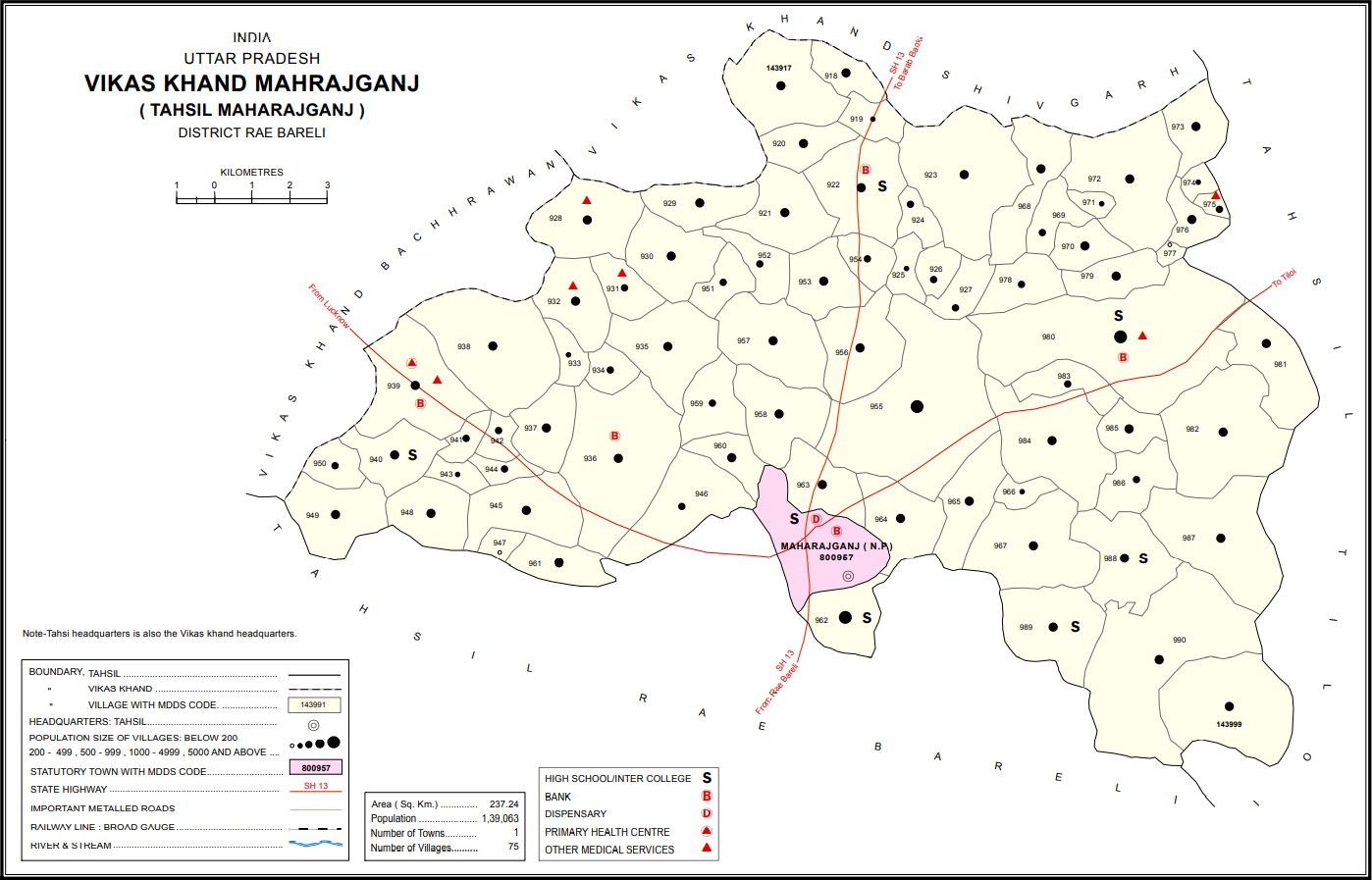
- Map showing Para Kalan (#930) in Maharajganj CD block

- Location in Uttar Pradesh, India
- Coordinates: 26.447784°N 81.243822°E
- Country India: India
- State: Uttar Pradesh
- District: Raebareli

Area
  - Total: 3.254 km^{2} (1.256 sq mi)

Population (2011)
  - Total: 2,217
  - Density: 681.3/km^{2} (1,765/sq mi)

Languages
  - Official: Hindi
- Time zone: UTC+5:30 (IST)
- Vehicle registration: UP-35

Para Kalan is a village in Maharajganj block of Rae Bareli district, Uttar Pradesh, India. As of 2011, its population is 2,217, in 435 households. It has one primary school and no healthcare facilities. It is located 9 km from Maharajganj, the block headquarters. The main staple foods are wheat and rice.

The 1961 census recorded Para Kalan as comprising 8 hamlets, with a total population of 1,028 people (541 male and 487 female), in 217 households and 200 physical houses. The area of the village was given as 804 acres.

The 1981 census recorded Para Kalan as having a population of 1,377 people, in 390 households, and having an area of 325.37 hectares.
