= Maharajganj, Raebareli =

Maharajganj Mahrajganj
- Nagar panchayat
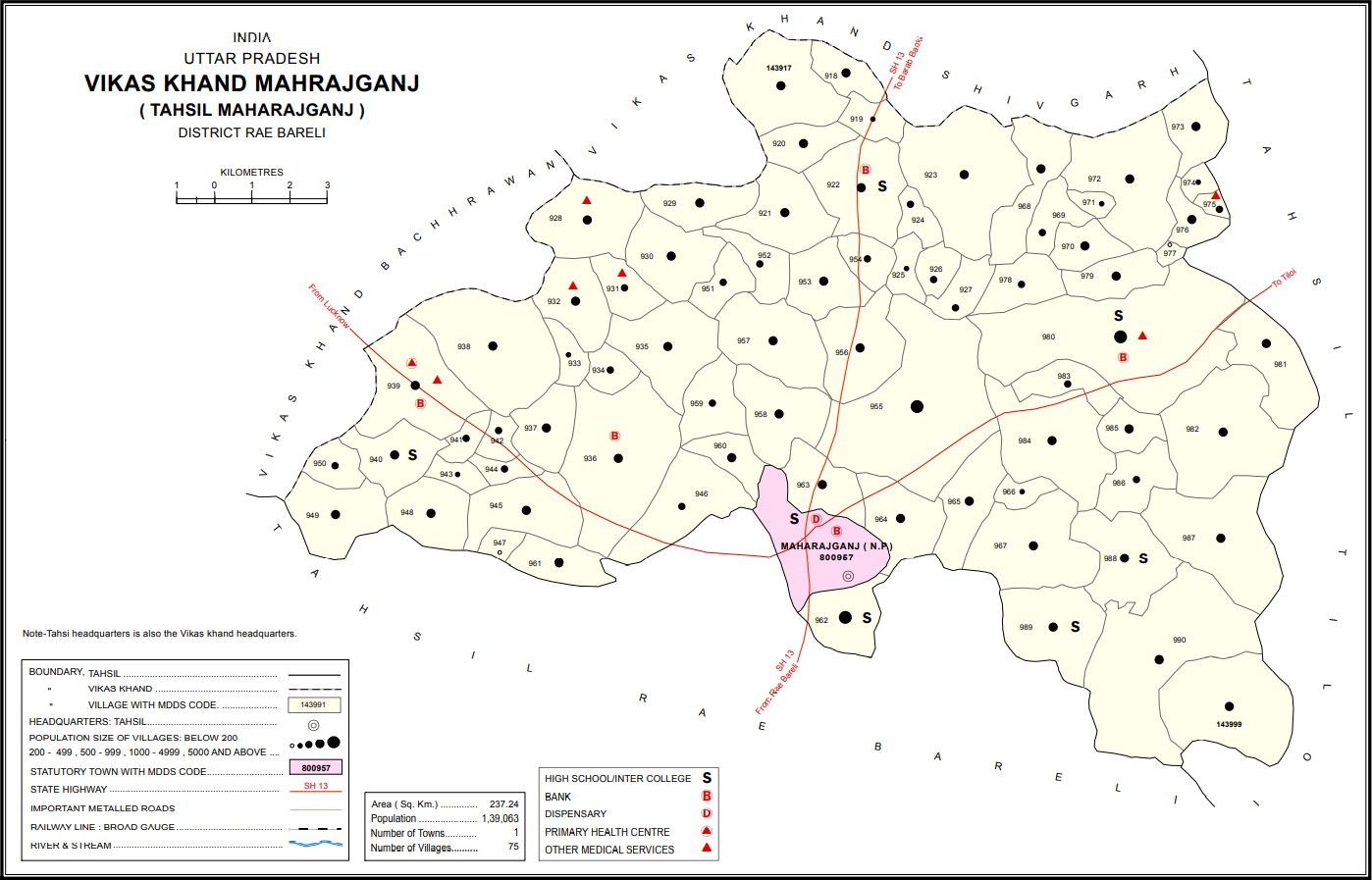
- Map of Maharajganj CD block

- Location in Uttar Pradesh, India
- Coordinates: 26°23′N 81°17′E
- Country: India
- State: Uttar Pradesh
- District: Rae Bareli

Area
  - Total: 1.69 km^{2} (0.65 sq mi)

Population (2011)
  - Total: 6,673
  - Density: 3,950/km^{2} (10,200/sq mi)

Languages
  - Official: Hindi
- Time zone: UTC+5:30 (IST)
- PIN: 229306

Maharajganj is a town and nagar panchayat in Rae Bareli district, Uttar Pradesh, India. It serves as the headquarters of a tehsil. As of 2011, its population is 6,673, in 1,037 households.

== History ==
Maharajganj was originally called Drigbijaiganj, after a bazar founded by Raja Drigbijai Singh in the village of Atrehta And appointed Sheikh Shubhan, the Zamindar of Jihawa, as the Zilladar of Digvijay Ganj Bazar.Later, Sheikh Shubhan changed the name of the market to Maharajganj in honor of Raja Sahib.For years, the rule of Sheikh Shubhan and his descendants continued on the Maharajganj market.Shaykh Shubhan, whose ancestors were from the lineage of the first Caliph of Islam, Abu Bakr Siddiqui, came to India from Arabia via Iran in 11th century.In 1935, Sheikh Bashir Ahmed Siddiqui, the grandson of Sheikh Shubhan, got Maharajganj the status of town area from the then British government. Drigjibai Singh was the Kanhpuria raja of Simrauta and the ancestors of the rajas of Chandapur.

Maharajganj was made the seat of a tehsil in 1869 when Raebareli district underwent a major administrative overhaul. The tehsil was made up of 6 parganas: Mohanganj, Simrauta, Inhauna, Kumhrawan, Bachhrawan, and Hardoi. Maharajganj itself was in Simrauta pargana.

At the turn of the 20th century, Maharajganj was administratively counted as part of the village of Atrehta. It had the tehsil headquarters, a police station, a dispensary, a post office, an inspection bungalow, a cattle pound, and a large middle school. The bazar then functioned as the main market in the northern part of Raebareli district.

Maharajganj was first upgraded from village to town status in 1935, at the same time as Bachhrawan, Dalmau, Jais, and Lalganj.

Maharajganj was declassified as a town during the 1961 census due to non-fulfilment of urban conditions. It was recorded as comprising 4 hamlets, with a total population of 2,619 people (1,363 male and 1,256 female), in 626 households and 612 physical houses. Its area was given as 169 acres. It was described as holding a market twice per week, on Mondays and Fridays; the market specialised in leather and utensils and had an average attendance of about 2,000. At that point, Maharajganj had a hospital and a post office, as well as the following small industrial establishments: 5 grain mills, 7, miscellaneous food processing facilities, 5 makers of clothing, 1 maker of products made from cork/bamboo/cane/leaves, 4 shoe manufacturers, 1 maker of brass and/or bell metal products, 7 bicycle repair shops, 15 makers of jewellery and/or precious metal items, and 1 manufacturer/repairer not assigned to any category.

Maharajganj was returned to town status at the 1981 census. At that time, its main imports were listed as brass sheets, cloth, and jaggery; the main items manufactured were brass utensils, leather, and pulses; and the main exports were leather, wheat, and pulses.

== Demographics ==
Historical population
Year	Pop.	±%
1941	1,993	—
1951	2,084	+4.6%
1961	Not given	—
1971	Not given	—
1981	3,837	—
1991	5,010	+30.6%
2001	6,015	+20.1%
2011	6,673	+10.9%
Source: 2011 Census of India

According to the 2011 census, Maharajganj has a population of 6,673 people, in 1,037 households. The town's sex ratio is 915 females to every 1000 males; 3,485 of Maharajganj's residents are male (52.2%) and 3,188 are female (47.8%). The 0-6 age group makes up about 13.1% of the town's population; the sex ratio for this group is 923, which is above the district-wide urban ratio of 909 for this group. Members of Scheduled Castes make up 13.59% of the town's population, while no members of Scheduled Tribes were recorded. The town's literacy rate was 80.75% (counting only people age 7 and up); literacy was higher among men and boys (86.74%) than among women and girls (74.19%). The scheduled castes literacy rate is 69.89% (78.6% among men and boys, and 59.95% among women and girls).

In terms of employment, 20.11% of Maharajganj residents were classified as main workers (i.e. people employed for at least 6 months per year) in 2011. Marginal workers (i.e. people employed for less than 6 months per year) made up 11.45%, and the remaining 68.44% were non-workers. Employment status varied significantly according to gender, with 49.58% of men being either main or marginal workers, compared to 11.86% of women.

51.69% of Maharajganj residents live in slum conditions as of 2011. There are 5 slum areas in Maharajganj: Vaishya Nagar, Shanti Nagar, Rudra Nagar, Aryanagar, and Gandhi Nagar Ward No. 1. These range in size from about 95 to 135 households and have between 22 and 44 tap water access points. The number of flush toilets installed in people's homes ranges from 15 to 35. All 5 areas are serviced by a mix of open and closed sewers.

== Villages ==
Maharajganj CD block has the following 75 villages:

Village name	Total land area (hectares)	Population (in 2011)
Alipur	539	3,461
Majhigawan	181	1,782
Nahariya	64	421
Bhatsara	141	1,220
Purasi	379	1,894
Samaspur Halor	459	4,871
Jamurawan	825.5	4,448
Kakkerpur Urf Bhtijepur	84.2	751
Barwaliya	55	476
Belwa	99	630
Kanspur	58	515
Tauli	382.2	2,753
Para Khurd	397	1,848
Para Kalan	325.4	2,217
Ramgaon	159.6	978
Ghurauna	251.4	1,029
Juniha	85.4	441
Narayanpur	124.3	684
Hasanpur	416.4	2,340
Salethu	850.8	4,782
Asni	218.2	1,279
Radhopur	787	4,849
Hardoi	526.4	2,308
Atara	209.2	1,279
Hajipur	124.3	507
Sultanpur	80.2	575
Balai Mau	39.1	376
Chilauli	101.2	519
Bara Huwan	335.1	1,732
Indaura	156.9	914
Benipur	26.8	120
Parwanpur	262.4	1,044
Oee	312.5	1,829
Rai Mau	148.5	807
Jamurwa	131.3	904
Baskata	139.9	515
Kusuri Sagarpur	268.4	1,945
Rajapur Kanspur	130	964
Mon	1,267	6,262
Kuvana	346.4	1,595
Kotwa Madaniya	342.7	2,191
Pokharani	407.2	2,736
Took	180	929
Odhi	135.4	1,098
Jihwa	363.5	2,491
Atrehta	648.1	5,628
Pali	343	1,571
Kayar	303	2,489
Kusmahura	298	2,240
Balipur	56	407
Jyona	499.4	3,940
Manjh Gaon	357	2,579
Hilha	156	835
Jamoliya	157	1,383
Bhaiyapur	52	323
Mohamdabad Kotwa	626.9	3,017
Bari Gohanna	464.6	1,334
Gangapur	41.5	288
Kadariya	42	506
Sersa	96.4	1,000
Utehibad Farosa	17.5	132
Pure Achali	197	689
Kairawa	218.9	1,658
Mau	1,239	7,323
Sikandarpur	389.2	3,029
Mungtal	601.5	1,162
Depar Mau	128.6	947
Muraini	620.8	3,028
Tajuddinpur	132.5	1,090
Andupur	221.3	901
Tisa Khanapur	615.2	2,778
Domapur	367.9	2,254
Chandapur	348.2	2,342
Janai	984.5	3,991
Dautra	583.9	2,890
