= Janai, Raebareli =

Janai
- Village
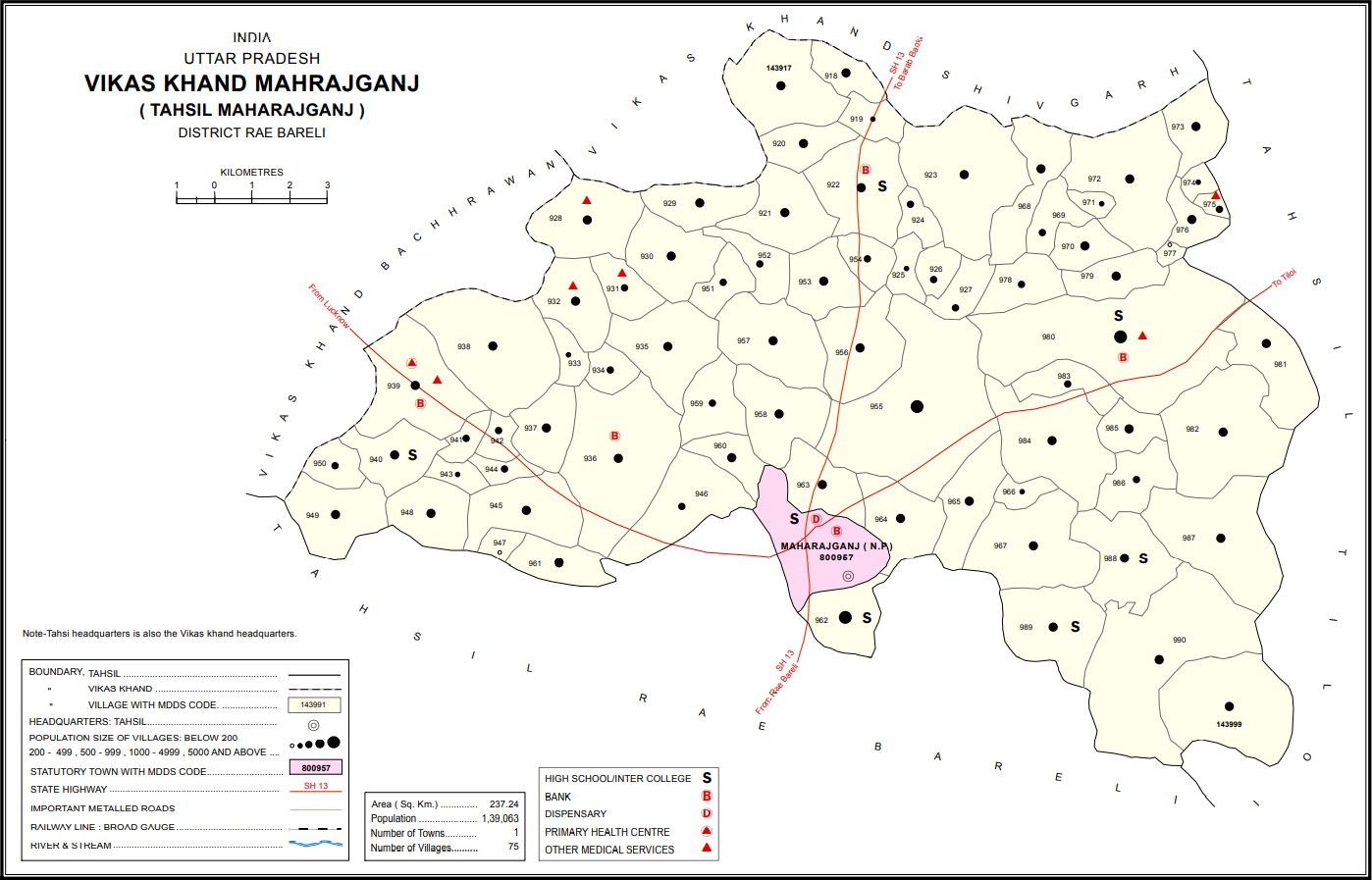
- Map showing Janai (#990) in Maharajganj CD block

- Location in Uttar Pradesh, India
- Coordinates: 26.364629°N 81.359682°E
- Country India: India
- State: Uttar Pradesh
- District: Raebareli

Area
  - Total: 9.845 km^{2} (3.801 sq mi)

Population (2011)
  - Total: 3,991
  - Density: 405.4/km^{2} (1,050/sq mi)

Languages
  - Official: Hindi
- Time zone: UTC+5:30 (IST)
- Vehicle registration: UP-35

Janai is a village in Maharajganj block of Rae Bareli district, Uttar Pradesh, India. As of 2011, its population is 3,991, in 425 households. It has 3 primary schools and no healthcare facilities. It is located 10 km from Maharajganj, the block headquarters. The main staple foods are wheat and rice.

The 1961 census recorded Janai as comprising 9 hamlets, with a total population of 1,922 people (985 male and 937 female), in 406 households and 394 physical houses. The area of the village was given as 2,430 acres and it had a post office at that point.

The 1981 census recorded Janai as having a population of 2,275 people, in 438 households, and having an area of 980.54 hectares.

== Archaeology ==
In the late 1990s, archaeologists D. P. Tewari and Anoop Kumar Singh discovered remains of a brick temple and stone sculptures at Janai, which they dated to approximately the 9th or 10th century.
