= Bhatsara =

- Village
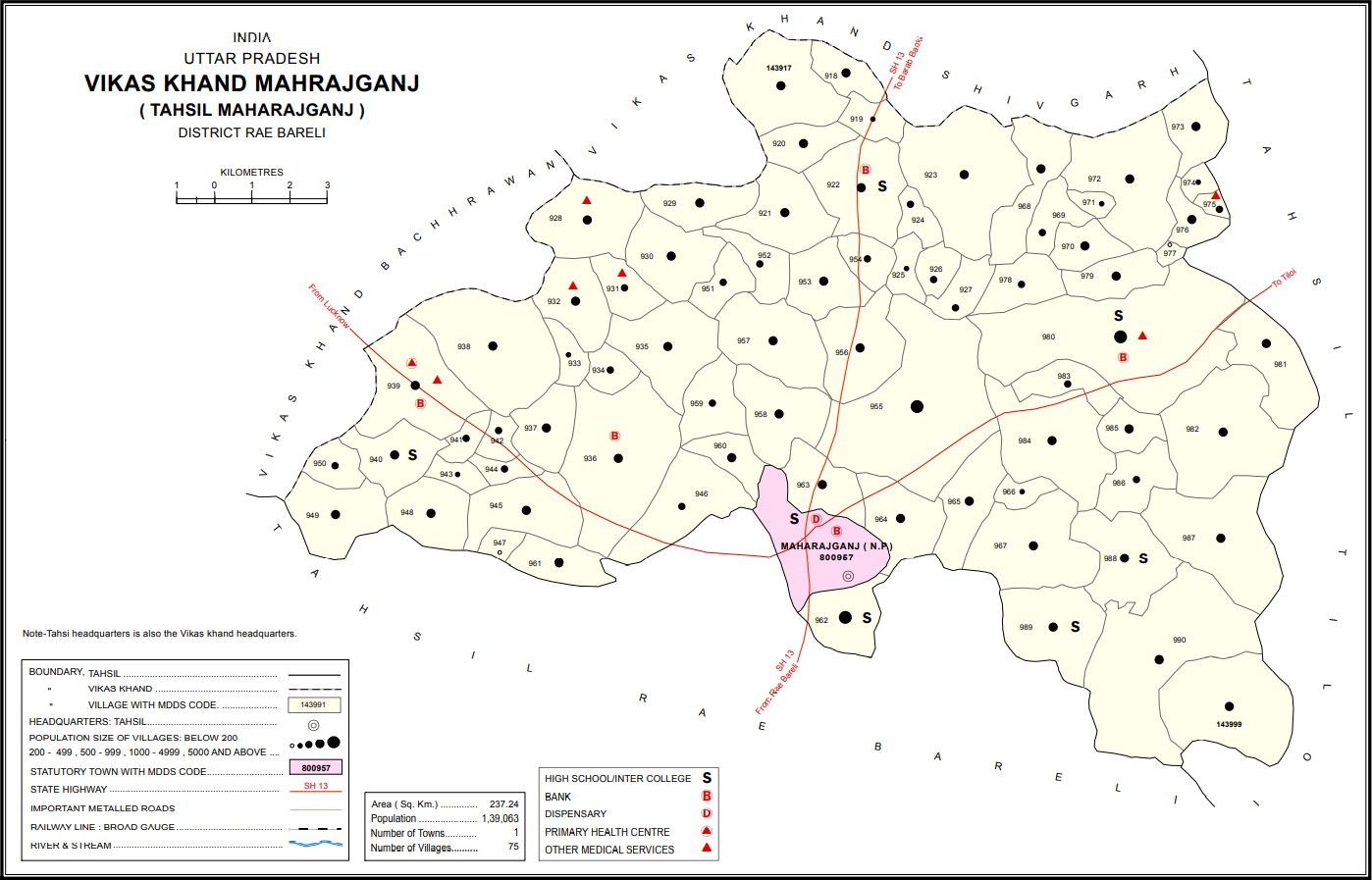
- Map showing Bhatsara (#920) in Maharajganj CD block

- Location in Uttar Pradesh, India
- Coordinates: 26.472627°N 81.273367°E
- Country India: India
- State: Uttar Pradesh
- District: Raebareli

Area
  - Total: 1.41 km^{2} (0.54 sq mi)

Population (2011)
  - Total: 1,220
  - Density: 865/km^{2} (2,240/sq mi)

Languages
  - Official: Hindi
- Time zone: UTC+5:30 (IST)
- Vehicle registration: UP-35

Bhatsara is a village in Maharajganj block of Rae Bareli district, Uttar Pradesh, India. As of 2011, its population is 1,220, in 232 households. It has one primary school and no healthcare facilities. It is located 12 km from Maharajganj, the block headquarters. The main staple foods are wheat and rice.

The 1961 census recorded Bhatsara as comprising 5 hamlets, with a total population of 678 people (302 male and 376 female), in 112 households and 106 physical houses. The area of the village was given as 355 acres.

The 1981 census recorded Bhatsara as having a population of 727 people, in 143 households, and having an area of 144.08 hectares. It had no amenities other than drinking water at the time.
