= Narayanpur, Maharajganj, Raebareli =

Narayanpur Narāyanpur
- Village
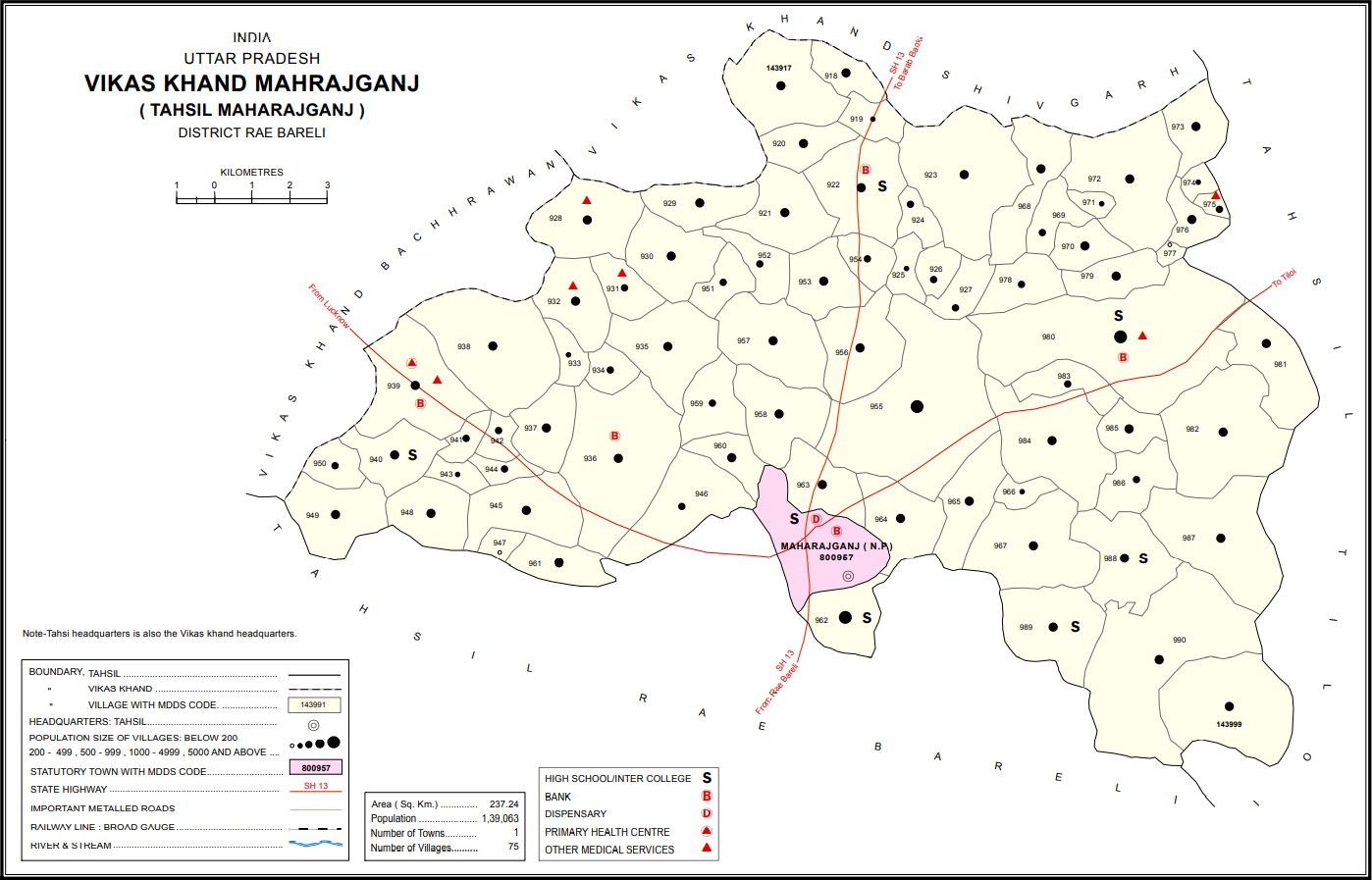
- Map showing Narayanpur (#934) in Maharajganj CD block

- Location in Uttar Pradesh, India
- Coordinates: 26.418813°N 81.229465°E
- Country India: India
- State: Uttar Pradesh
- District: Raebareli

Area
  - Total: 1.243 km^{2} (0.480 sq mi)

Population (2011)
  - Total: 684
  - Density: 550/km^{2} (1,430/sq mi)

Languages
  - Official: Hindi
- Time zone: UTC+5:30 (IST)
- Vehicle registration: UP-35

Narayanpur is a village in Maharajganj block of Rae Bareli district, Uttar Pradesh, India. As of 2011, its population is 684, in 136 households. It has one primary school and no healthcare facilities. It is located 9 km from Maharajganj, the block headquarters. The main staple foods are wheat and rice.

The 1961 census recorded Narayanpur (as "Narainpur") as comprising 1 hamlets, with a total population of 219 people (131 male and 88 female), in 58 households and 58 physical houses. The area of the village was given as 300 acres.

The 1981 census recorded Narayanpur (also as "Narainpur") as having a population of 382 people, in 136 households, and having an area of 121.82 hectares.
