= Pali, Raebareli =

Pali Pāli
- Village
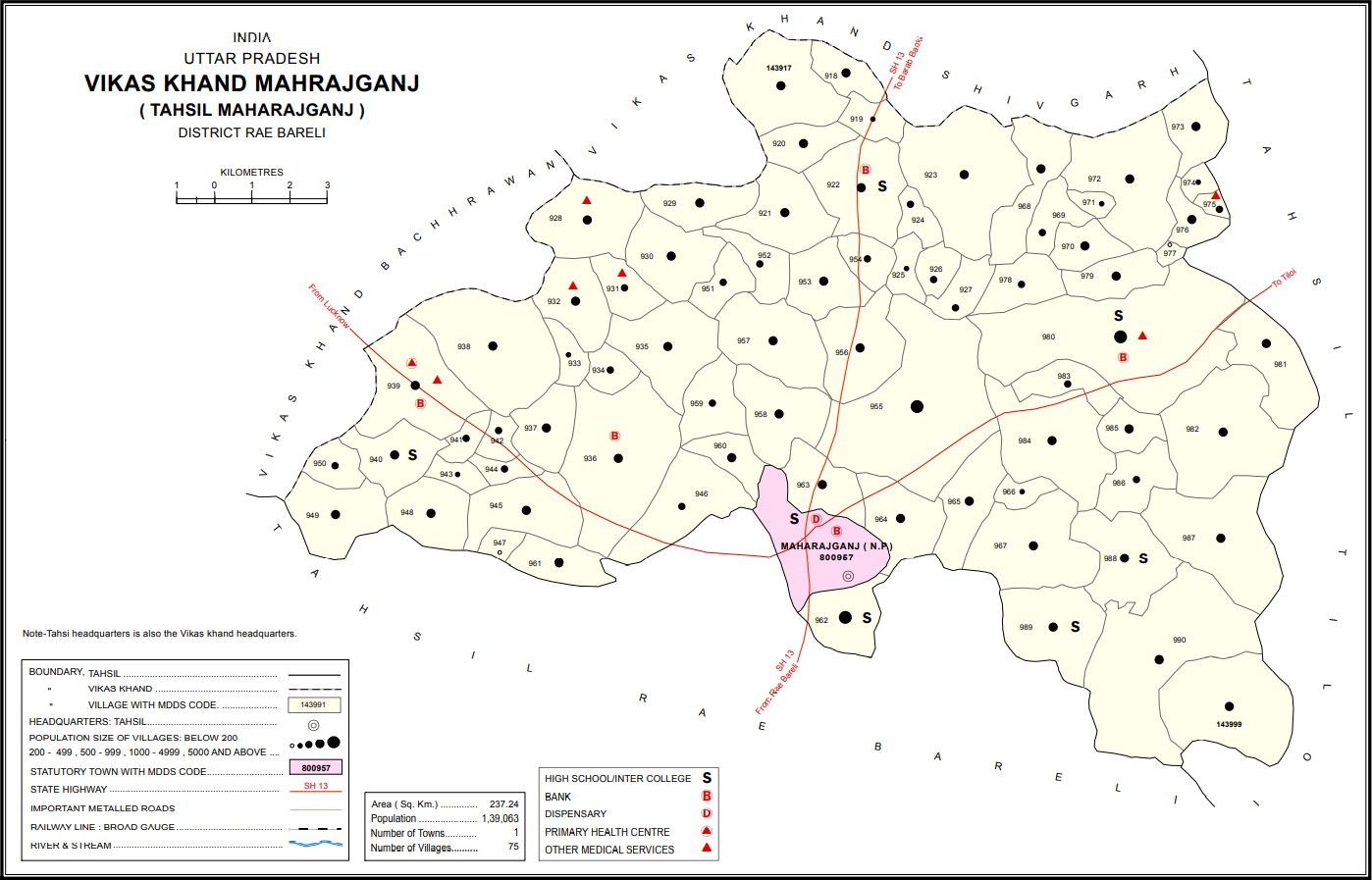
- Map showing Pali (#963) in Maharajganj CD block

- Location in Uttar Pradesh, India
- Coordinates: 26.398769°N 81.280202°E
- Country India: India
- State: Uttar Pradesh
- District: Raebareli

Area
  - Total: 3.43 km^{2} (1.32 sq mi)

Population (2011)
  - Total: 1,571
  - Density: 458/km^{2} (1,190/sq mi)

Languages
  - Official: Hindi
- Time zone: UTC+5:30 (IST)
- Vehicle registration: UP-35

Pali is a village in Maharajganj block of Rae Bareli district, Uttar Pradesh, India. As of 2011, its population is 1,571, in 270 households. It has one primary school and no healthcare facilities. It is located 2 km from Maharajganj, the block headquarters.

The 1961 census recorded Pali as comprising 5 hamlets, with a total population of 500 people (286 male and 214 female), in 94 households and 94 physical houses. The area of the village was given as 879 acres.

The 1981 census recorded Pali as having a population of 806 people, in 138 households, and having an area of 359.77 hectares.
