= Hardoi, Raebareli =

Hardoi
- Village
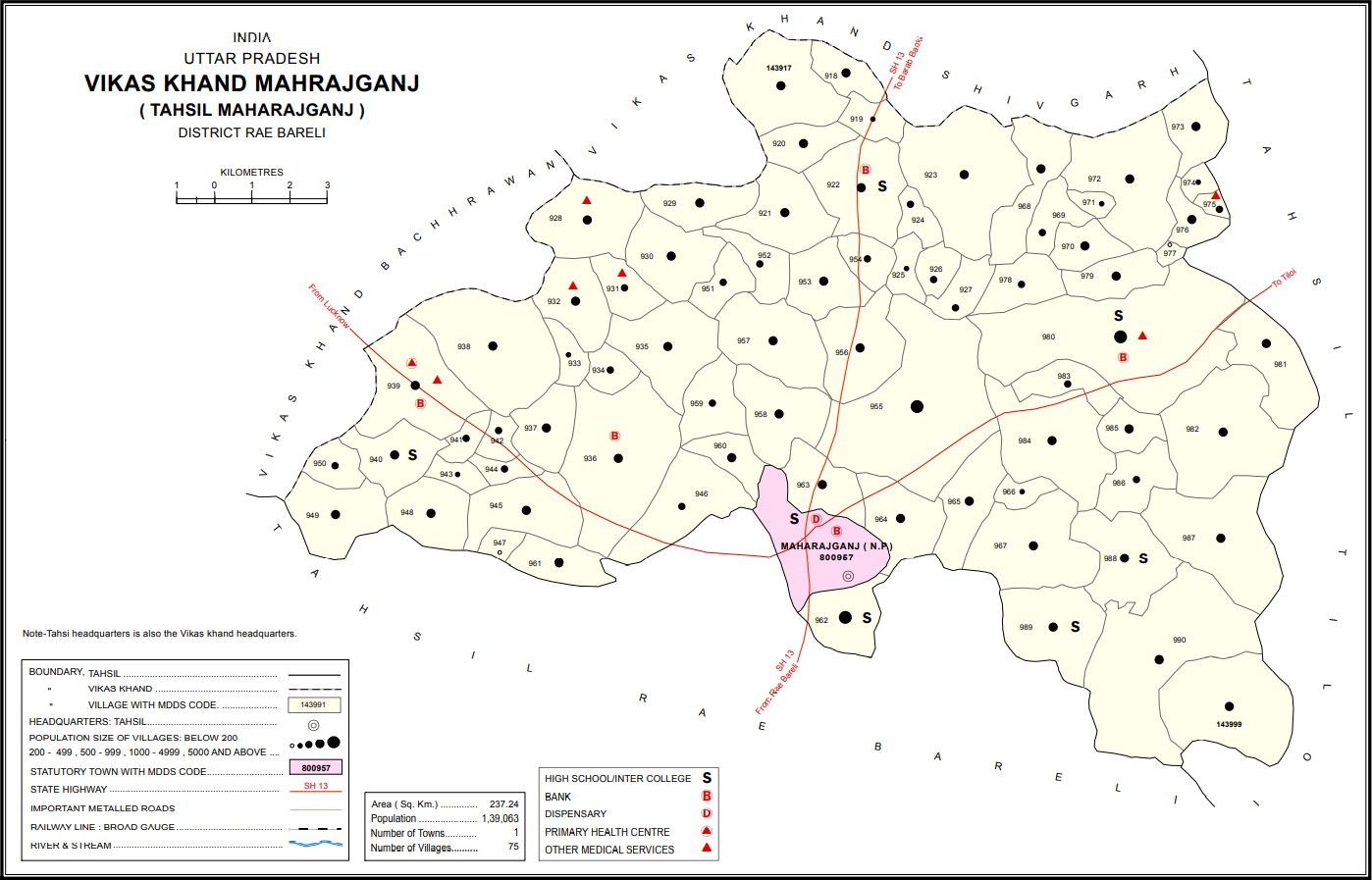
- Map showing Hardoi (#939) in Maharajganj CD block

- Location in Uttar Pradesh, India
- Coordinates: 26.41018°N 81.183741°E
- Country India: India
- State: Uttar Pradesh
- District: Raebareli

Area
  - Total: 5.264 km^{2} (2.032 sq mi)

Population (2011)
  - Total: 2,308
  - Density: 438.4/km^{2} (1,136/sq mi)

Languages
  - Official: Hindi
- Time zone: UTC+5:30 (IST)
- Vehicle registration: UP-35

Hardoi is a village in Maharajganj block of Rae Bareli district, Uttar Pradesh, India. Located on the road from Maharajganj to Bachhrawan, Hardoi historically served as the seat of a pargana and has a now-ruined fort built in the early 1400s under the Jaunpur Sultanate. As of 2011, its population is 2,308, in 415 households.

== History ==
Hardoi was supposedly founded by and named after a Bhar named Hardeo. The Bhars were the original rulers of the region and are said to have successfully repelled an invasion by the Muslim folk hero Ghazi Sayyid Salar Masud in the 11th century. Agha Shahid, an attendant of Malik Taj-ud-Din of Bachhrawan, arrived to reinforce Salar Masud's forces but was killed in battle and is buried here. An old tradition connected with Agha Shahid's tomb holds that if someone disputes the authenticity of a legal document, then its holder places it on the tomb and the challenger tries to tear it off. According to legend, if the document is genuine, then the challenger's thumb will tear off instead of the paper.

The Bhars of Hardoi were subjugated in the early 15th century by Ibrahim Shah Sharqi of the Jaunpur Sultanate. Ibrahim Shah had a mud fort (now in ruins) built here and granted the place to a follower of his named Sayyid Jalal-ud-Din. Later, at the end of the 16th century, Hardoi was listed in the Ain-i-Akbari as a mahal of the sarkar of Lucknow. Its proprietors were listed as Brahmins, it was assessed at a value of 359,748 dams, and it supplied a force of 300 infantry to the Mughal army.

The 1901 census recorded Hardoi as having a population of 1,378 people, all of whom were Hindu and most of whom were Kurmis. The village was held by Kurmi tenants and it had 15 masonry houses, with the rest being built from mud.

The 1961 census recorded Hardoi as comprising 2 hamlets, with a total population of 1,311 people (680 male and 631 female), in 355 households and 333 physical houses. The area of the village was given as 1,287 acres. At that point, it had a post office, 2 grain mills, 3 small manufacturers of clothing, and 2 small establishments involved in stone dressing, stone crushing, and/or making structural stone goods.

The 1981 census recorded Hardoi as having a population of 1,640 people, in 339 households, and having an area of 526.51 hectares.
