= Balipur, Maharajganj, Raebareli =

Balipur
- Village
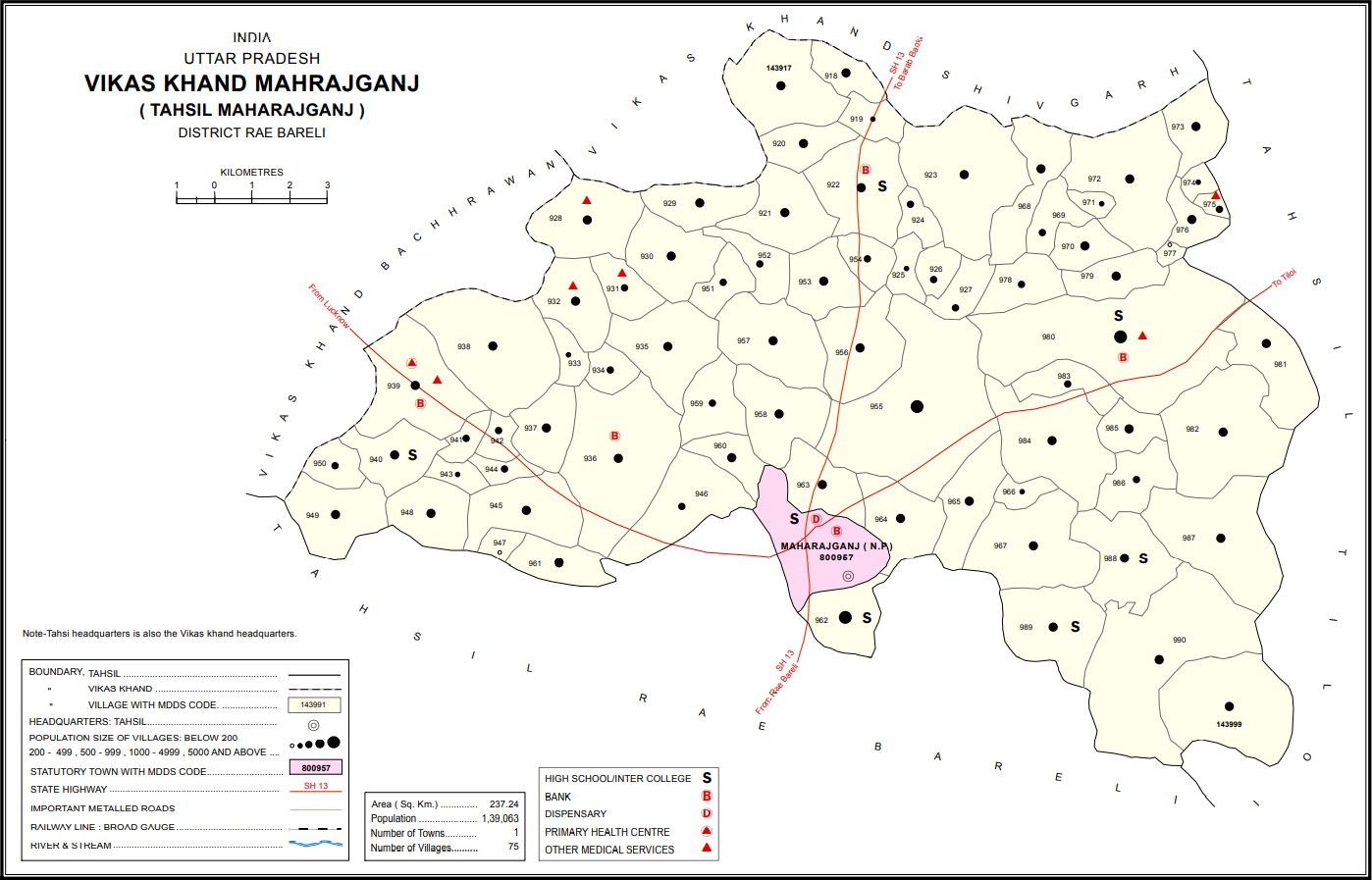
- Map showing Balipur (#966) in Maharajganj CD block

- Location in Uttar Pradesh, India
- Coordinates: 26.395675°N 81.326886°E
- Country India: India
- State: Uttar Pradesh
- District: Raebareli

Area
  - Total: 0.56 km^{2} (0.22 sq mi)

Population (2011)
  - Total: 407
  - Density: 730/km^{2} (1,900/sq mi)

Languages
  - Official: Hindi
- Time zone: UTC+5:30 (IST)
- Vehicle registration: UP-35

Balipur is a village in Maharajganj block of Rae Bareli district, Uttar Pradesh, India. As of 2011, its population is 407, in 71 households. It has one primary school and no healthcare facilities. It is located 4 km from Maharajganj, the block headquarters. The main staple foods are wheat and rice.

The 1961 census recorded Balipur as comprising 2 hamlets, with a total population of 149 people (81 male and 68 female), in 33 households and 29 physical houses. The area of the village was given as 135 acres.

The 1981 census recorded Balipur as having a population of 203 people, in 45 households, and having an area of 495.54 hectares.
