= Purasi =

Purasi Purāsi
- Village
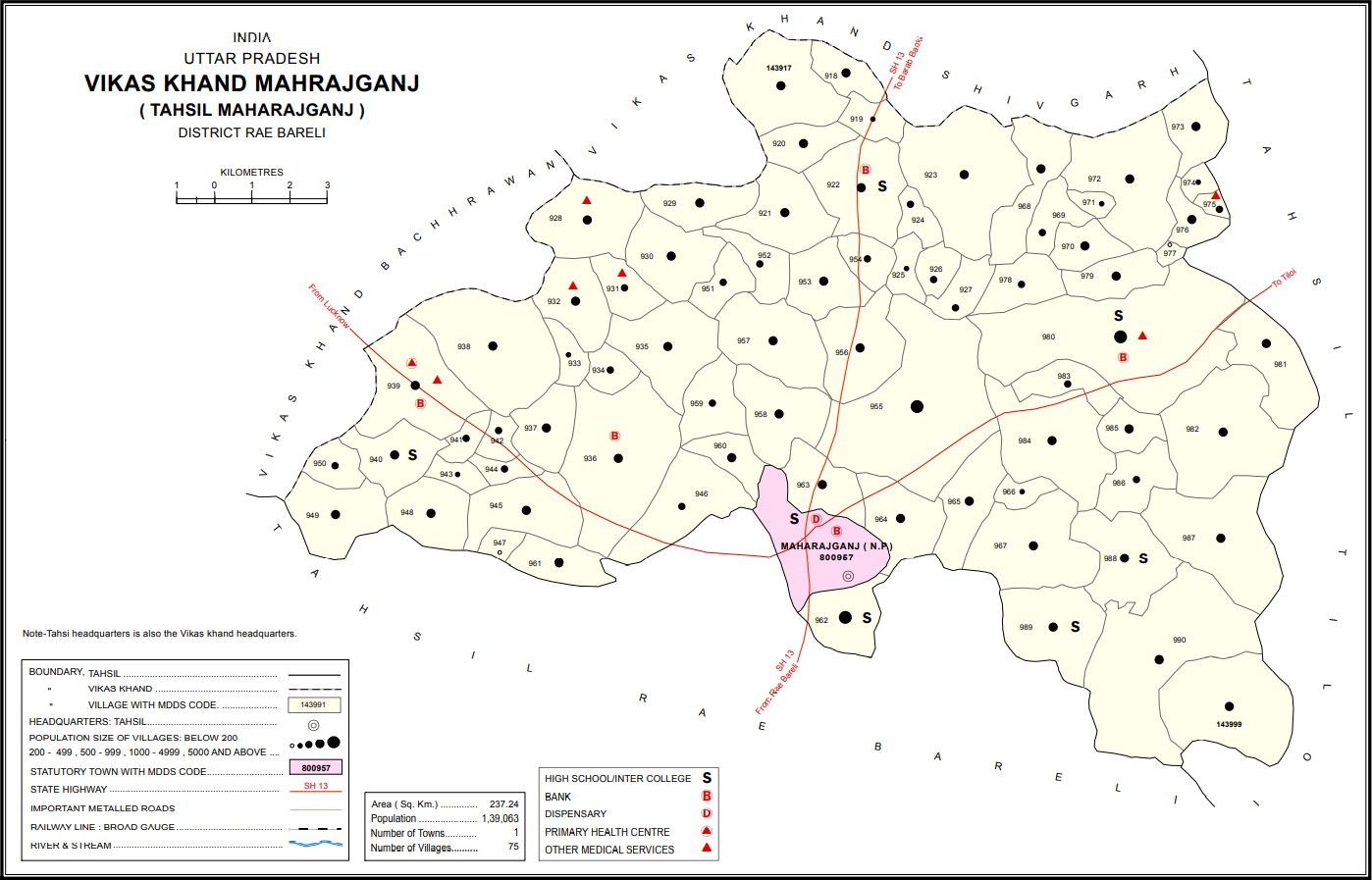
- Map showing Purasi (#921) in Maharajganj CD block

- Location in Uttar Pradesh, India
- Coordinates: 26.453522°N 81.273569°E
- Country India: India
- State: Uttar Pradesh
- District: Raebareli

Area
  - Total: 3.79 km^{2} (1.46 sq mi)

Population (2011)
  - Total: 1,894
  - Density: 500/km^{2} (1,290/sq mi)

Languages
  - Official: Hindi
- Time zone: UTC+5:30 (IST)
- Vehicle registration: UP-35

Purasi is a village in Maharajganj block of Rae Bareli district, Uttar Pradesh, India. As of 2011, its population is 1,894, in 354 households. It has one primary school and no healthcare facilities. It is located 10 km from Maharajganj, the block headquarters. The main staple foods are wheat and rice.

The 1961 census recorded Purasi as comprising 6 hamlets, with a total population of 787 people (414 male and 473 female), in 204 households and 190 physical houses. The area of the village was given as 946 acres.

The 1981 census recorded Purasi as having a population of 1,155 people, in 220 households, and having an area of 382.84 hectares.
