= Atrehta =

- Village
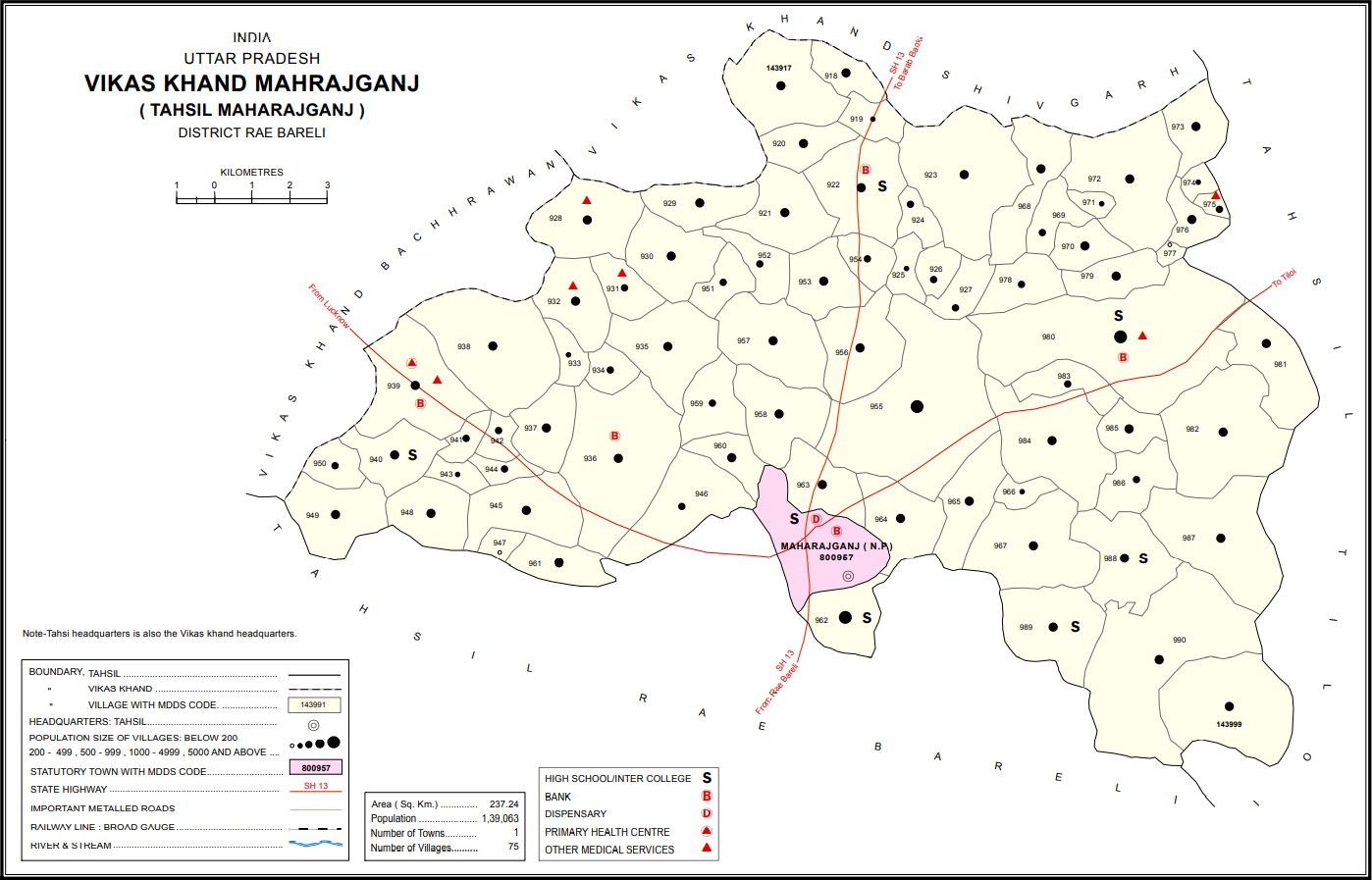
- Map showing Atrehta (#962) in Maharajganj CD block

- Location in Uttar Pradesh, India
- Coordinates: 26.380096°N 81.287358°E
- Country India: India
- State: Uttar Pradesh
- District: Raebareli

Area
  - Total: 6.481 km^{2} (2.502 sq mi)

Population (2011)
  - Total: 5,628
  - Density: 868.4/km^{2} (2,249/sq mi)

Languages
  - Official: Hindi
- Time zone: UTC+5:30 (IST)
- Vehicle registration: UP-35

Atrehta is a village in Maharajganj block of Rae Bareli district, Uttar Pradesh, India. Located 1 km from Maharajganj, the block headquarters, it is the village whose lands the Maharajganj bazar was originally founded on. As of 2011, Atrehta has a population of 5,628, in 1,056 households. It has two primary schools and no healthcare facilities.

The 1961 census recorded Atrehta as comprising 12 hamlets, with a total population of 1,800 people (896 male and 904 female), in 391 households and 386 physical houses. The area of the village was given as 1,617 acres.

The 1981 census recorded Atrehta as having a population of 2,797 people, in 541 households, and having an area of 359.77 hectares.
