= Salethu =

- Village
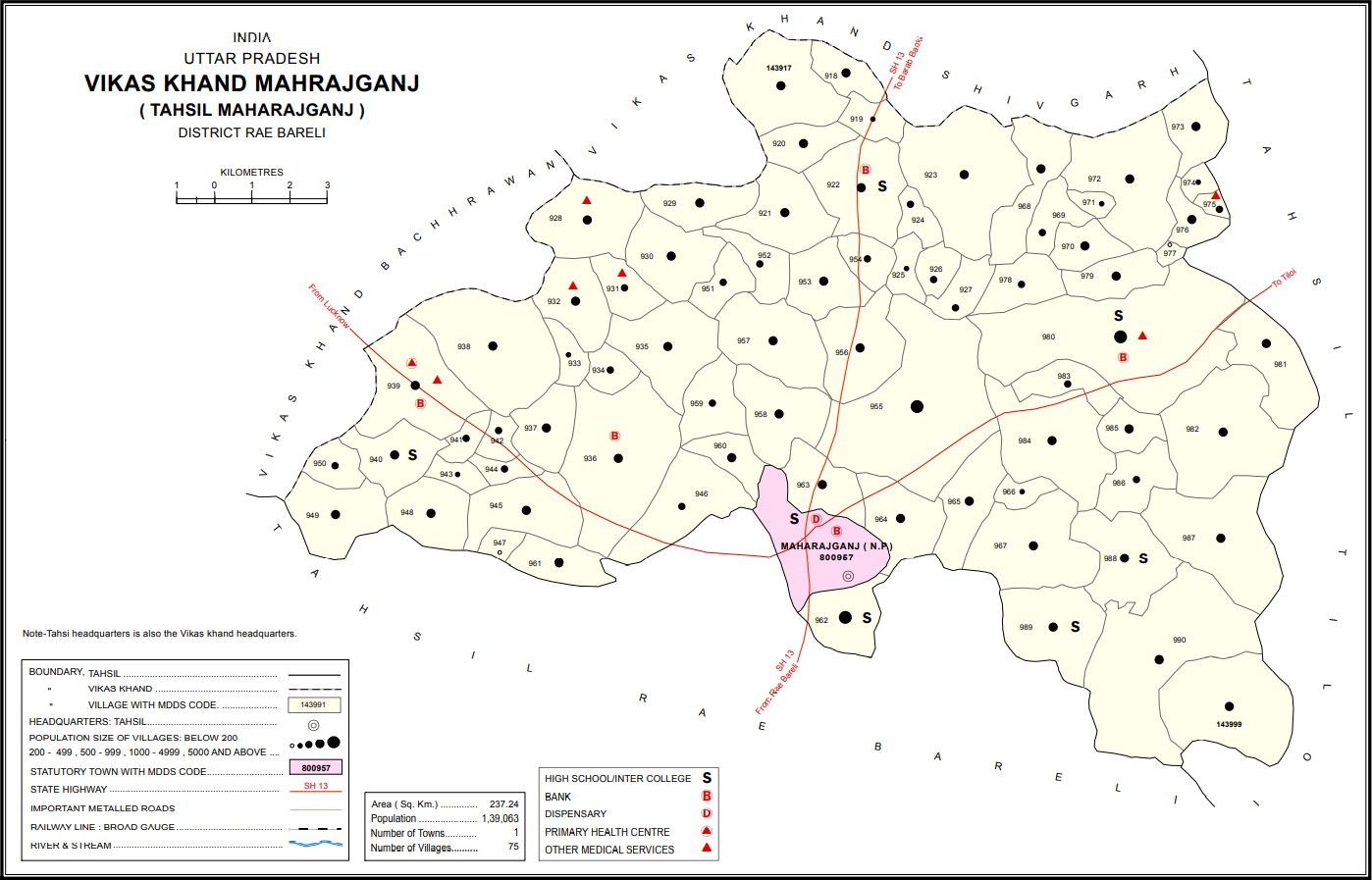
- Map showing Salethu (#936) in Maharajganj CD block

- Location in Uttar Pradesh, India
- Coordinates: 26.405029°N 81.229253°E
- Country India: India
- State: Uttar Pradesh
- District: Raebareli

Area
  - Total: 8.508 km^{2} (3.285 sq mi)

Population (2011)
  - Total: 4,782
  - Density: 562.1/km^{2} (1,456/sq mi)

Languages
  - Official: Hindi
- Time zone: UTC+5:30 (IST)
- Vehicle registration: UP-35

Salethu is a village in Maharajganj block of Rae Bareli district, Uttar Pradesh, India. Located 8 km from Maharajganj, the block headquarters, Salethu has a lake which is fairly deep and narrow but dries up during the summer. As of 2011, the village's population is 4,782, in 858 households. It has two pre-primary schools and no healthcare facilities.

The 1961 census recorded Salethu as comprising 9 hamlets, with a total population of 1,904 people (943 male and 961 female), in 429 households and 416 physical houses. The area of the village was given as 2,103 acres.

The 1981 census recorded Salethu as having a population of 2,588 people, in 475 households, and having an area of 851.05 hectares.
