= Asni, Maharajganj, Raebareli =

Asni
- Village
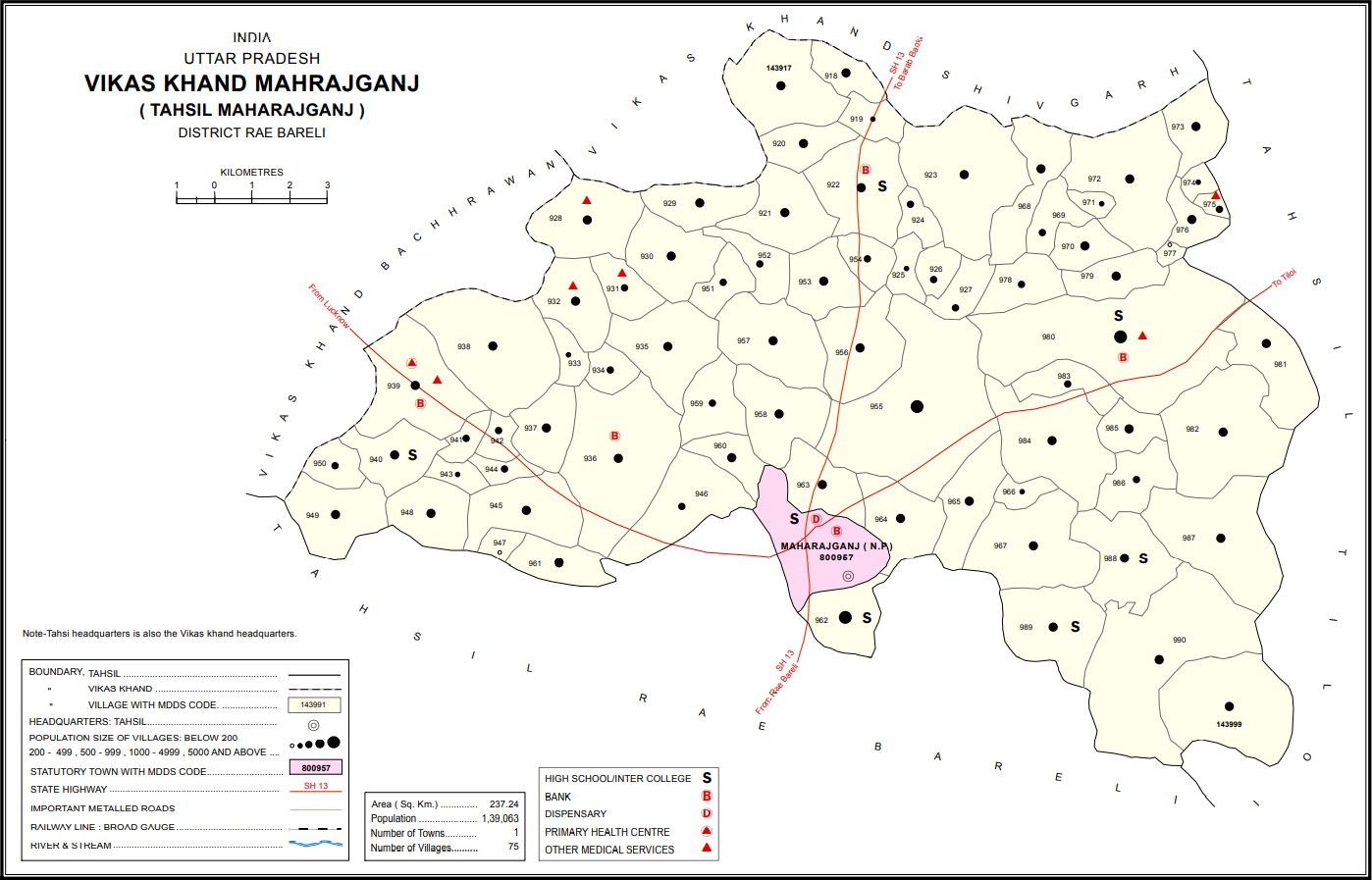
- Map showing Asni (#937) in Maharajganj CD block

- Location in Uttar Pradesh, India
- Coordinates: 26.408508°N 81.212105°E
- Country India: India
- State: Uttar Pradesh
- District: Raebareli

Area
  - Total: 2.182 km^{2} (0.842 sq mi)

Population (2011)
  - Total: 1,279
  - Density: 586.2/km^{2} (1,518/sq mi)

Languages
  - Official: Hindi
- Time zone: UTC+5:30 (IST)
- Vehicle registration: UP-35

Asni is a village in Maharajganj block of Rae Bareli district, Uttar Pradesh, India. As of 2011, its population is 1,279, in 238 households. It has one primary school and no healthcare facilities. It is located 9 km from Maharajganj, the block headquarters. The main staple foods are wheat and rice.

The 1961 census recorded Asni as comprising 2 hamlets, with a total population of 638 people (332 male and 306 female), in 167 households and 157 physical houses. The area of the village was given as 544 acres.

The 1981 census recorded Asni as having a population of 710 people, in 157 households, and having an area of 265.48 hectares.
