= Mon, Raebareli =

Mon
- Village
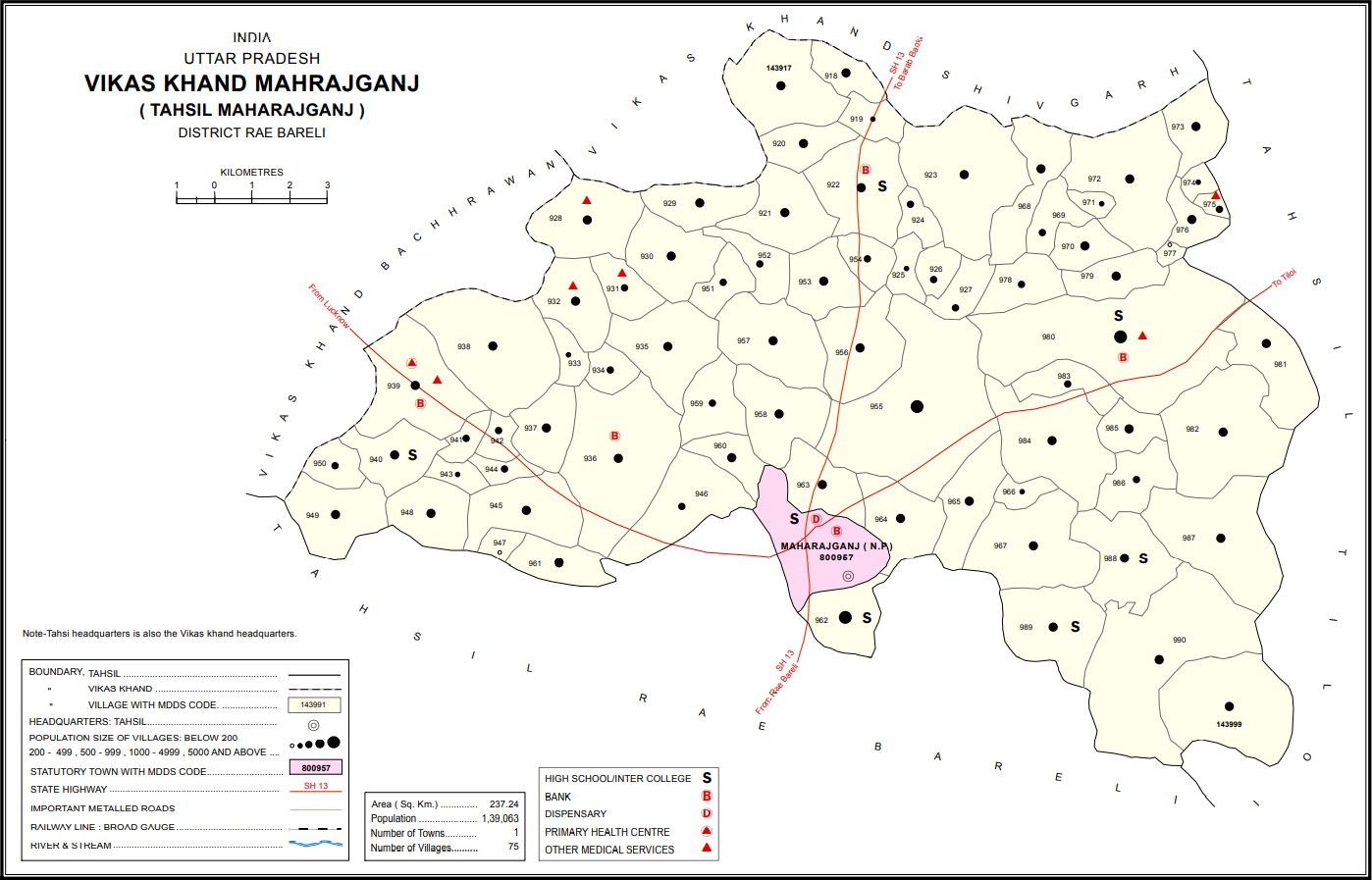
- Map showing Mon (#955) in Maharajganj CD block

- Location in Uttar Pradesh, India
- Coordinates: 26.405525°N 81.304662°E
- Country India: India
- State: Uttar Pradesh
- District: Raebareli

Area
  - Total: 1.267 km^{2} (0.489 sq mi)

Population (2011)
  - Total: 6,262
  - Density: 4,942/km^{2} (12,800/sq mi)

Languages
  - Official: Hindi
- Time zone: UTC+5:30 (IST)
- Vehicle registration: UP-35

Mon is a village in Maharajganj block of Rae Bareli district, Uttar Pradesh, India. As of 2011, its population is 6,262, in 1,056 households. It has 4 primary schools and no healthcare facilities. It is located 4 km from Maharajganj, the block headquarters. The main staple foods are wheat and rice.

The 1961 census recorded Mon as comprising 19 hamlets, with a total population of 2,405 people (1,275 male and 1,130 female), in 457 households and 430 physical houses. The area of the village was given as 3,129 acres, and it had a post office at that point.

The 1981 census recorded Mon as having a population of 3,367 people, in 605 households, and having an area of 1,265.85 hectares.

== Archaeology ==
In the late 1990s, archaeologists D. P. Tewari and Anoop Kumar Singh discovered remains of a brick temple at Mon, along with samples of redware and grey ware. They did not list a date for any of these.
