= Para Khurd =

Para Khurd Pāra Khurd
- Village
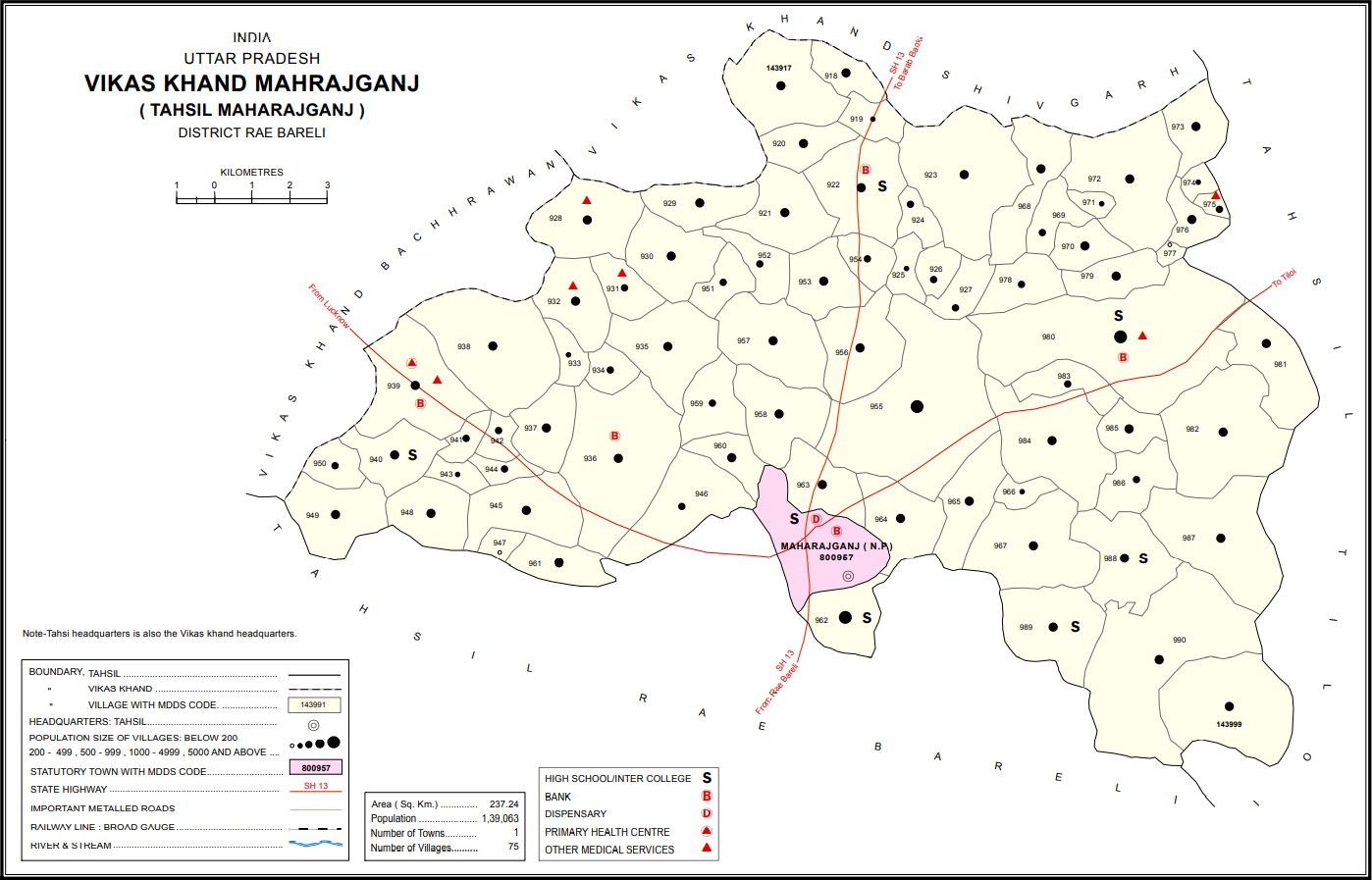
- Map showing Para Khurd (#929) in Maharajganj CD block

- Location in Uttar Pradesh, India
- Coordinates: 26.454162°N 81.247426°E
- Country India: India
- State: Uttar Pradesh
- District: Raebareli

Area
  - Total: 3.97 km^{2} (1.53 sq mi)

Population (2011)
  - Total: 1,848
  - Density: 465/km^{2} (1,210/sq mi)

Languages
  - Official: Hindi
- Time zone: UTC+5:30 (IST)
- Vehicle registration: UP-35

Para Khurd is a village in Maharajganj block of Rae Bareli district, Uttar Pradesh, India. As of 2011, its population is 1,848, in 353 households. It has 4 primary schools and no healthcare facilities. It is located 8 km from Maharajganj, the block headquarters. The main staple foods are wheat and rice.

The 1961 census recorded Para Khurd as comprising 5 hamlets, with a total population of 790 people (402 male and 388 female), in 185 households and 166 physical houses. The area of the village was given as 697 acres.

The 1981 census recorded Para Khurd as having a population of 1,138 people, in 231 households, and having an area of 289.35 hectares.
