= Alipur, Ludhiana =

Alipur
- village
- Location in Punjab, India Alipur (India)
- Coordinates: 30°41′49.8″N 76°18′20.38″E
- Country: India
- State: Punjab
- District: Ludhiana

Population (2010)
  - Total: 755

Languages
  - Official: Punjabi
  - Regional: Punjabi
- Time zone: UTC+5:30 (IST)

Alipur is a village located in Khanna tehsil, in the Ludhiana district of Punjab, India. The total population of the village is about 755.
