= Alipur, Raebareli =

Alipur
- Village
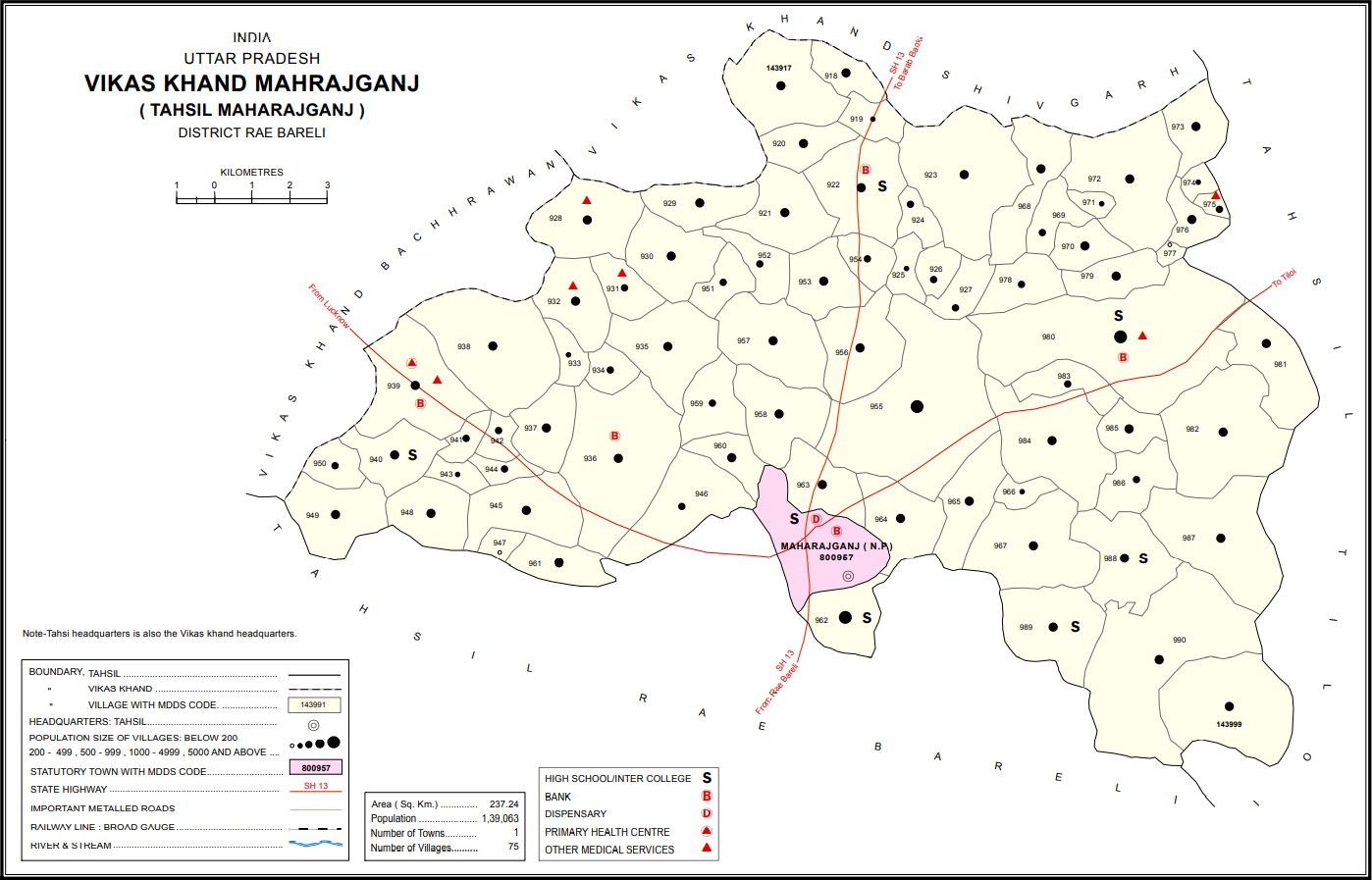
- Map showing Alipur (#143917) in Maharajganj CD block

- Location in Uttar Pradesh, India
- Coordinates: 26.482952°N 81.275512°E
- Country India: India
- State: Uttar Pradesh
- District: Raebareli

Area
  - Total: 5.39 km^{2} (2.08 sq mi)

Population (2011)
  - Total: 3,461
  - Density: 642/km^{2} (1,660/sq mi)

Languages
  - Official: Hindi
- Time zone: UTC+5:30 (IST)
- Vehicle registration: UP-35

Alipur is a village in Maharajganj block of Rae Bareli district, Uttar Pradesh, India. As of 2011, its population is 3,461, in 600 households. It has one primary school and no healthcare facilities. It is located 14 km from Maharajganj, the block headquarters. The main staple foods are wheat and rice.

The 1961 census recorded Alipur as comprising 15 hamlets, with a total population of 1,660 people (827 male and 833 female) in 391 households and 380 physical houses. The area of the village was given as 1,406 acres.

The 1981 census recorded Alipur as having a population of 2,061 people in 439 households, and having an area of 568.99 hectares.
