= Alipur, Bihar =

Alipur
- village
- Location in Bihar, India Alipur (India)
- Coordinates: 24.93°N 84.83°E
- Country: India
- State: Bihar
- District: Gaya

Languages
  - Official: Magahii, Hindi
- Time zone: UTC+5:30 (IST)
- ISO 3166 code: IN-BR
- Nearest city: Tekari
- Climate: Humid Subtropical (Köppen)

Alipur is a village in Gaya district, in the state of Bihar, in eastern India.

== Overview ==
Alipur is a village located 9 km from the commercial town of Tikari in Gaya district in Bihar, India. Alipur has a population of 4,825 as of 2011. Alipur village has a marketplace. The local police station was established in 2001. Here, there is a Government school up to class 8 as well as a Government hospital Health and wellness center is also established here. Alipur is a big marketplace for the nearby villages. The Mukhiya of Chaita Panchayat (Smt Mini Devi) is from Alipur.Bharatiya Janata Party leader and social activist Ramanand Sharma is also from this village. Alipur's economy is primarily agricultural. However, some people own businesses and others have jobs in the public and private sectors. Alipur has its own marketplace. Some people from the village have businesses there. Tekari is about 9 km away and serves as a larger market for goods and services that Alipur cannot provide.

== Religion ==
Alipur Village is home to a number of Hindu temples, namely:

- Shiv Temple
- Thakurbari
- Devi Maa
- Sankat Mochan Hanuman Mandir
- Sun Temple
- Ram Janki Mandir (under construction)

== Geography ==
Alipur is located at 24.93°N 84.83°E. It has an average elevation of 82 metres (269 feet). It is located near the boundary of the Gaya district. The Village is bounded on the southeast by the Jahanabad district, on the south by Keshpa Village, on the west by Arwal, and on the northwest by Tikari Town. Alipur is 9 km from the city of Tekari, and is connected via a link road to the main road connecting Gaya to Jehanabad.

== Demographics ==
The village has a sizeable population of the Bhumihar caste

== Notable people ==
- Muhibullah Bihari
