= Chandapur, Raebareli =

Chandapur Chandāpur
- Village
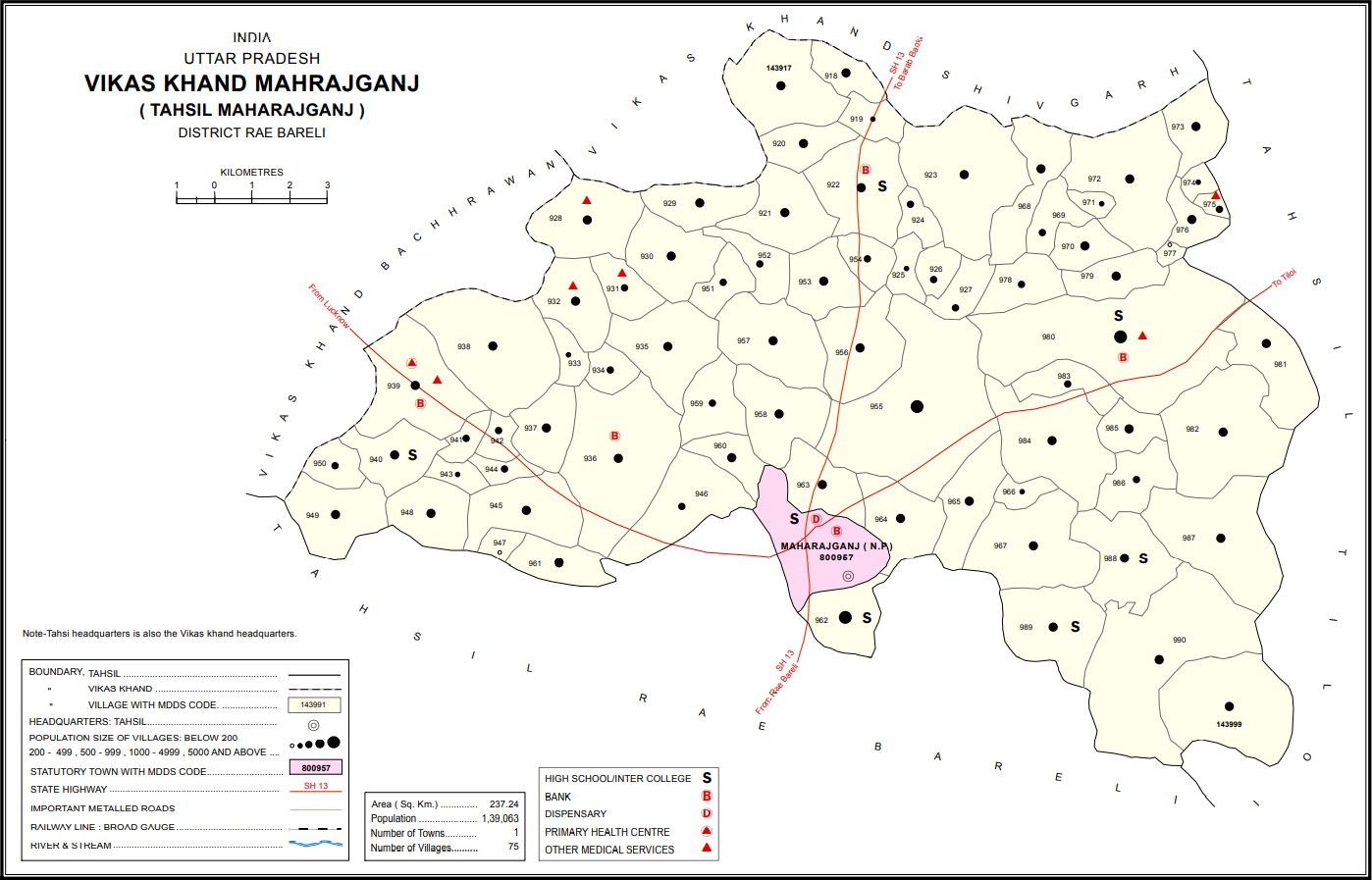
- Map showing Chandapur (#989) in Maharajganj CD block

- Location in Uttar Pradesh, India
- Coordinates: 26.369243°N 81.331595°E
- Country India: India
- State: Uttar Pradesh
- District: Raebareli

Area
  - Total: 3.482 km^{2} (1.344 sq mi)

Population (2011)
  - Total: 2,342
  - Density: 672.6/km^{2} (1,742/sq mi)

Languages
  - Official: Hindi
- Time zone: UTC+5:30 (IST)
- Vehicle registration: UP-35

Chandapur is a village in Maharajganj block of Rae Bareli district, Uttar Pradesh, India. Located 4 miles (6.4 km) east of Maharajganj, the block headquarters, it historically was the seat of the Kanhpuria rajas of Chandapur. In 2011, Chandapur had a population of 2,342, in 425 households. It has two primary schools and no healthcare facilities. It has a bazar known as Sheodarshanganj, which holds markets twice per week. The village also hosts the Anna Purna Devi fair on Phalguna Badi 13, which is associated with Maha Shivaratri. Vendors bring sweets, toys and everyday items to sell at the fair.

== History ==
Chandapur was founded by Drigbijai Singh, the Kanhpuria raja of Simrauta, and it was the seat of the rajas of Chandapur. The old fort was originally built in an area surrounded by jungle, much of which remained at the turn of the 20th century. The 1901 census recorded Chandapur as having a population of 1,177, with Ahirs being the predominant group.

The 1961 census recorded Chandapur as comprising nine hamlets, with a total population of 787 (433 male and 354 female) in 193 households and 185 physical houses. The area of the village was given as 908 acres (367 ha) and it had a post office and a medical practitioner at that time.

The 1981 census recorded Chandapur as having a population of 1,356 in 280 households and having an area of 382.43 hectares (945.0 acres).
