= Alipur, Netrokona =

Alipur আলীপুর
- Location in Bangladesh
- Coordinates: 24°39.1′N 90°50.6′E
- Country: Bangladesh
- Division: Mymensingh Division
- District: Netrokona District
- Upazila: Kendua Upazila
- Municipality: Kendua Municipality
- Village: Alipur

Area
  - Total: 0.3 km^{2} (0.12 sq mi)
- Time zone: UTC+6 (BST)
- Post code: 2480

Alipur (Bengali: আলীপুর) is a village of Kendua Upazila in Netrokona District in the Division of Mymensingh, Bangladesh.

== Geography ==
Alipur is located at 24.6510°N 90.8427°E. It has 500 households and a total area of 0.3 km^{2}.
