= Ali Nagar Roda =

Coordinates: 30.64589°N 72.35837°E

- Village
- Interactive map of Ali Nagar Roda
- Country: Pakistan
- Region: Toba Tek Singh
- District: Toba Tek Singh District
- Time zone: UTC+5 (PST)

Ali Nagar Roda is a village located in central Punjab province of Pakistan. It is part of the Pir Mahal Tehsil of Toba Tek Singh District. There is a mosque and Imam Bargah in this village. It consists of more than hundred houses. Syed families are the ruling authority there.

The village has produced doctors and engineers who work in companies nationwide and internationally. Several national singers are native to the area.
