= Hasanpur, Maharajganj, Raebareli =

Hasanpur
- Village
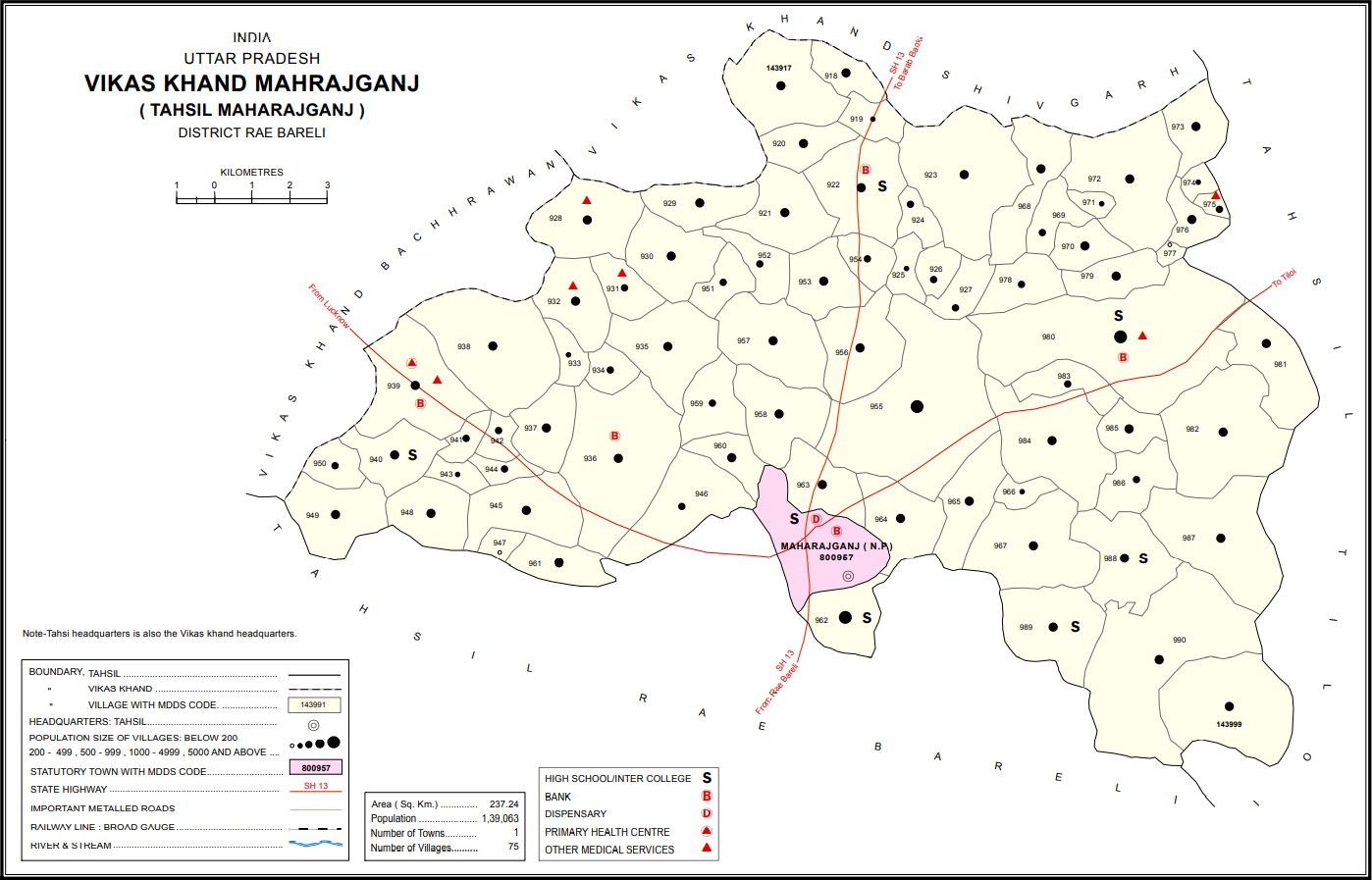
- Map showing Hasanpur (#935) in Maharajganj CD block

- Location in Uttar Pradesh, India
- Coordinates: 26.42832°N 81.240086°E
- Country India: India
- State: Uttar Pradesh
- District: Raebareli

Area
  - Total: 4.164 km^{2} (1.608 sq mi)

Population (2011)
  - Total: 2,340
  - Density: 562/km^{2} (1,460/sq mi)

Languages
  - Official: Hindi
- Time zone: UTC+5:30 (IST)
- Vehicle registration: UP-35

Hasanpur is a village in Maharajganj block of Rae Bareli district, Uttar Pradesh, India. As of 2011, its population is 2,340, in 445 households. It has one primary school and no healthcare facilities. It is located 10 km from Maharajganj, the block headquarters. The main staple foods are wheat and rice.

The 1961 census recorded Hasanpur as comprising 2 hamlets, with a total population of 962 people (495 male and 467 female), in 222 households and 212 physical houses. The area of the village was given as 1,052 acres.

The 1981 census recorded Hasanpur as having a population of 1,463 people, in 291 households, and having an area of 425.33 hectares.
