= Alipur, Kapurthala =

Alipur
- Village
- Location in Punjab, India Alipur (India)
- Coordinates: 31.2722633°N 75.5771573°E
- Country: India
- State: Punjab
- District: Kapurthala

Government
  - Type: Panchayati raj (India)
  - Body: Gram panchayat

Population (2011)
  - Total: 110
- Sex ratio 57/53♂/♀

Languages
  - Official: Punjabi
  - Other spoken: Hindi
- Time zone: UTC+5:30 (IST)
- PIN: 144804
- Telephone code: 01822
- ISO 3166 code: IN-PB
- Vehicle registration: PB-09
- Website: kapurthala.gov.in

Alipur is a village in Kapurthala district of Punjab State, India. It is located 13 kilometres (8.1 mi) from Kapurthala, which is both district and sub-district headquarters of Alipur. The village is administrated by a Sarpanch, who is an elected representative.

== Demography ==
According to the report published by Census India in 2011, Alipur has a total number of 17 houses and population of 110 of which include 57 males and 53 females. Literacy rate of Alipur is 74.47%, lower than state average of 75.84%. The population of children under the age of 6 years is 16 which is 14.55% of total population of Alipur, and child sex ratio is approximately 1667 higher than state average of 846.

== Population data ==
Particulars	Total	Male	Female
Total No. of Houses	17	-	-
Population	110	57	53
Child (0–6)	16	6	10
Schedule Caste	24	9	15
Schedule Tribe	0	0	0
Literacy	74.47 %	76.47 %	72.09 %
Total Workers	28	25	3
Main Worker	26	0	0
Marginal Worker	2	2	0

== Air travel connectivity ==
The closest airport to the village is Sri Guru Ram Dass Jee International Airport.
