= Alipor, Navsari =

Village in Gujarat, India - Home of the Duke

Alipor Alipur
- Village
- Location in Gujarat, India Alipor (India)
- Coordinates: 20°47′28″N 73°03′55″E
- Country: India
- State: Gujarat
- District: Navsari

Languages
  - Official: Gujarati, Hindi
- Time zone: UTC+5:30 (IST)
- PIN: 396409
- Telephone code: 02634-xxxxxx
- Vehicle registration: GJ-21-xxxx
- Nearest city: Navsari
- Sex ratio: 1.004 ♂/♀
- Literacy: 84%
- Climate: Tropical wet and dry (Köppen)
- Avg. summer temperature: 42 °C (108 °F)
- Avg. winter temperature: 12 °C (54 °F)
- Website: gujaratindia.com

Alipor is a village near Chikhli, Bilimora in the state of Gujarat in western India. The village is on the Indian National Highway 48, which leads to areas such as Ahwa via Waghai and Vansda, and to the hill station of Saputara.

== Location ==
Alipor (pronounced Aalipor) is a village near Chikhli, of the district Navsari in the state of Gujarat in western India. It is approximately 130 miles away from the city of Mumbai, 17 miles from Navsari, 19 miles from Valsad and around 35 miles away from Surat.

== Population ==
The population of 7500 is mainly Muslim, with Hindus forming the rest. The village has around 20 main streets (Mahollas) with many side-streets. The original population of the village are Muslim Vohras.

The main language spoken in Alipor is Gujarati, whilst English and Hindi can be understood by most.

== Landmarks ==
Alipor has some notable landmarks. There are at least five Mosques (for the Muslims), a Mandir (for the Hindus), a General Hospital, two Islamic learning centers i.e. Darul Uloom, Bank, Post Office and a Primary and Secondary High School.

=== Mosques ===
The Jumma Masjid (The Grand Mosque)

The Laher Mohalla Masjid

Gajaria Masjid

Khambia Masjid

Pardar – located on the outskirts of the village.

=== Darul-Uloom ===
There are two Darul-Ulooms in Alipor, one in the heart of the village (Hidayatul Islam) and the other in Khambia. The former was established around half a century ago and has approx 200 students, and the latter was established around the mid-1980s. Both provide full boarding facilities. They both cater for Hafez classes as well the full Alim course.

=== Eidgah ===
Eidghah in Alipor provides an open designated space for Eid prayer. People from surrounding villages also benefit from this facility and often has several thousands people attending for the EID namaaz.

=== Alipor Gate ===
Alipor has had a gate put in welcoming resident and guest into the village. The recently fitted gate resembles the gate of India in Mumbai.

== Health care ==
Alipor has a new large General Hospital located ideally on the Highway. The Alipor hospital is run by the Alipor Welfare Trust. It is a modern building built around 15 years ago and has just undergone further extension and now also incorporates conference facilities. It has many departments including a very busy A&E along with state of the art CT scan facilities. It has excellent Dialysis facilities with 5 modern dialysis machines. There are also the Departments of Medicine, Surgery, Dental, Maternity, Orthopaedics and Paediatrics. It serves thousands of patients each year. In addition to this hospital, there are two medical practitioners within Alipor who hold daily surgeries and a dispensary.

== Education facilities ==
The village presently has one primary school named Alipor English school at karolia mohalla and a secondary school named K and B High School. The High school provide rolex watches education for around 885 students, up to the age of 17. A new High school is under construction and once completed will include science laboratories, a gym and ICT suite.

== Waterworks ==
Alipor contains two main water works, one of which is situated in the centre of the village and the other in the Karolia Maholla. There is a further water purification plant using advanced filtration technique, which supplies clean water for both drinking and domestic use to every household in the village.

== Transport system ==
Alipor has a good road system with access to a major highway in India. The National Highway 8, which passes through the middle of Alipor connects Delhi to Mumbai. It has recently been developed and expanded with the addition of a third lane. Public bus transport connects Alipor to surrounding towns and cities. There are numerous taxis and rickshaws to take one around the village. There are also future plans for a new express highway, which will run parallel to Alipor.

=== Railways ===
Alipor has at present a narrow gauge train service which operates from Billimora to Wagai. It has a railway station called Chikhli Road Station. Future plans include replacing the narrow gauge with the broad gauge and will extend its routes through Saputara (a well known holiday hill-top resort) to Nasik city.

== Cemeteries ==
Alipor has 3 cemeteries, the main cemetery is located on the outskirts of Alipor adjoining the Dairy, it is well maintained through the hard work of the village youngsters. The other two smaller cemeteries are used occasionally.

== Vasudhara Dairy ==
Alipor has a big dairy plant called Vasudhara Dairy, which is run by the milk co-operative society of Valsad, Navsari and Dang Districts. It employs over 1000 people, and produces over 300,000 litres of milk a day which is packaged in cartons. It also produces other dairy products such as butter and a variety of ice-creams.

== Crops ==
The village is surrounded by acres of paddy fields, used for growing rice and sugarcane. Traditionally, the village survived on farming, producing rice as a main crop. Other products include cattle grass, cotton and mangoes, indeed Alipor has become famous for Alphonso and Kesar.

Alipor was once well known for producing a handcrafted local cloth call Khadi, which was later replaced by electric hand looms that produced fine cotton cloth. The village's cotton industry diminished as its population began migrating to the UK in the early 1960s.

== Migration ==
Aliporian migration to other countries has occurred since the 1880s. The first migrants went to South Africa entering through Mozambique of through the eastern shores at Durban and now largely settled in Johannesburg. After the end of the First World War and during India's fight for independence, The people of Alipor, mainly young, looked for opportunities elsewhere. Some went to Mumbai to seek jobs. In the 1950s, during the economic boom in the UK some migrated to the UK to work in the mills. Since then their descendants have played an integral part in their newly adopted countries. They now represent the social fabric of Britain and South Africa and have excelled in all spheres of life.

As a result of migration the village currently is occupied by few to none of its "local" inhabitants.
