= Muhibullah Bihari =

Mughal jurist (d. 1707)

Qāḍī Muhibullah al-Bihārī
- مُحِبُ‌الله البِهاری

Personal life
- Born: Muhib, Alipur, Bihar (present-day India)
- Died: 1119 AH / 1707 CE
- Main interest(s): Islamic logic (Mantiq), Usul al-Fiqh
- Notable work: Sullam al-ʿUlūm (“Ladder of the Sciences”)

Religious life
- Religion: Islam
- Denomination: Sunni
- Jurisprudence: Hanafi

Muslim leader
- Influenced: Later madrasa scholars and commentators on his work

Qadi Muhibullah al-Bihārī (also known as Muḥibballāh b. ʿAbd Shakūr al-Bihārī; died 1119 AH / 1707 AD) was a Hanafi jurist, logician, and scholar active in late Mughal India. Known particularly for his contributions to Islamic logic and Usul al-Fiqh (principles of jurisprudence), he was a prolific author whose Salm al-Ulum became a basic textbook in the madaris of the Subcontinent, creating a vast exegetical tradition.

== Early life and background ==
Muhibullah was born in Muhib, Alipur, Bihar (present-day India). In his early youth, he migrated to Awadh, where he pursued advanced studies in Islamic sciences and philosophy.

=== Scholarly career ===
Muhibullah emerged as a leading figure in the scholarly and religious circles of northern India during the late seventeenth century. He served as the Qadi of Lucknow under Mughal administration. His legal expertise is also noted in connection with the monumental compilation of the Fatawa 'Alamgiri, a comprehensive digest of Hanafi jurisprudence commissioned by Emperor Aurangzeb.

== Works ==
- Sullam al-ʻulūm: Muhibullah’s most renowned work is Sullam al-ʿUlūm (“The Ladder of Sciences”), completed before his death in 1707. It became an essential part of the Dars-i-Nizami curriculum and earned great popularity in madrasas and scholarly circles across India and beyond. The work attracted numerous commentaries by later scholars.
- Musallim al-thubūt مسلم الثبوت. 1879.
- "كتاب ال"مستصفى من علم الاصول. "ال"مطبعة الاميرية،. 1904.

== Intellectual influence ==
Bihari is remembered as part of the tradition of Indian Muslim scholars who contributed to philosophy, metaphysics, and rational sciences. Alongside figures such as Mulla Mahmud Jaunpuri and Mulla Ghulam Yahya Bihari.
