= Inhauna =

- Village
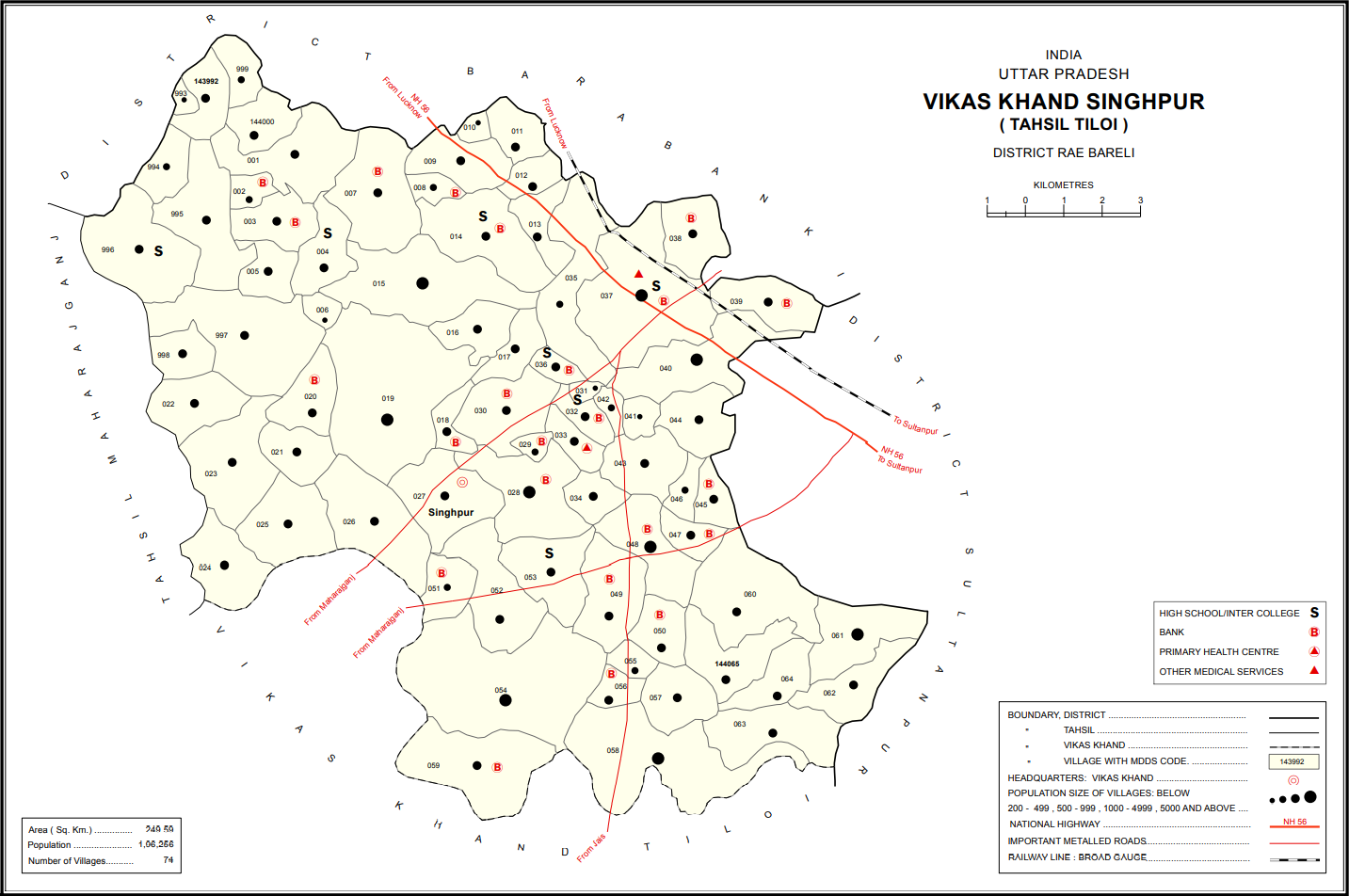
- Map showing Inhauna (#037) in Singhpur CD block

- Location in Uttar Pradesh, India
- Coordinates: 26.524578°N 81.492961°E
- Country: India
- State: Uttar Pradesh
- District: Raebareli

Area
  - Total: 8.62 km^{2} (3.33 sq mi)

Population (2011)
  - Total: 13,049
  - Density: 1,510/km^{2} (3,920/sq mi)

Languages
  - Official: Hindi
- Time zone: UTC+5:30 (IST)
- PIN: 229308
- Vehicle registration: UP-33

Inhauna is a village in the Singhpur block of Rae Bareli district, Uttar Pradesh, India. As of 2011, it has a population of 13,049 in 2,021 households.

Located at the junction of the Raebareli-Rudauli and Lucknow-Jaunpur roads, Inhauna is an old town that once served as the seat of a pargana and briefly as a tehsil. It has the ruins of an old fort built under the Nawabs of Awadh.

The old marketplace, known as Ratanganj, was built in 1863 by the tahsildar Ratan Narain. Markets are held twice a week, on Mondays and Thursdays, with most of the trade focused on livestock.

== History ==
Inhauna is listed in the late 16th-century Ain-i-Akbari as a mahal in the sarkar of Awadh. It retained this status under the Nawabs of Awadh, during which a fort was constructed in the southern part of the village. After the British annexed the Oudh State in 1856, Inhauna was designated as a tehsil headquarters in the Sultanpur district. However, it lost this status in 1869 when it was transferred to the Raebareli district as part of a broader administrative reorganisation. Following this change, Inhauna became part of the Maharajganj tehsil. With the relocation of the tehsil headquarters and police station, Inhauna experienced a decline in prominence, with its population decreasing from 3,974 in 1869 to 3,373 in 1901.

At the turn of the 20th century, Inhauna was described as the only sizeable town in the pargana. It was surrounded by orchards and had a post office, a cattle pound, and a middle vernacular school. North of the road to Lucknow was a designated military encampment ground.

The 1961 census recorded Inhauna as consisting of 12 hamlets, with a total population of 4,024 people (2,017 males and 2,007 females) in 906 households and 854 physical houses. The area of the village was recorded as 2,236 acres. The average attendance at the twice-weekly market was approximately 3,000 people.

The 1981 census recorded Inhauna as having a population of 4,905 people in 1,198 households, with an area of 851.05 hectares.
