= Ali Nagar Pali =

Ali Nagar Pali or simply Pali is a village in Kako Block, Jehanabad district in the Indian state of Bihar.

== Description ==
Pali village had a population of 1,693 as per the 2011 Census, with a literacy rate of 71.82%, higher than the Bihar state average. Scheduled Castes make up about 28.71% of village's population, while Scheduled Tribes account for only 0.06%.

In late 2024, a School Management Committee (Shiksha Samiti) was formed at the Government Middle School in the village. Preeti Raj was selected as the committee secretary. Local officials and community members took part in the event, stressing the importance of working together to run the school effectively.
