= Alipur, Punjab, Pakistan =

Alipur على پُور
- City
- Location of Alipur Alipur (Pakistan) Alipur (South Asia)
- Coordinates: 29°22′55″N 70°54′35″E
- Country: Pakistan
- Region: Punjab, Pakistan
- District: Muzaffargarh
- Elevation: 107 m (351 ft)

Population (2023)
  - Total: 74,095
- Time zone: UTC+5 (PST)
  - Summer (DST): UTC+6 (PDT)

Alipur (Urdu: على پُور), is a city of Muzaffargarh District that falls in DG Khan Division, in the Punjab province of Pakistan.

== Demographics ==
Population

According to 2023 census Alipur town had a population of 74,095 inhabitants.

Historical population
Year	Pop.	±% p.a.
1998	28,601	—
2017	44,504	+2.35%
2023	74,095	+8.87%

Languages

Languages of Alipur city (2023 Census)
1. Saraiki (76.5%)
2. Urdu (17.2%)
3. Punjabi (5.40%)
4. Others (0.90%)
