= Tiloi =

Tiloi Tīloi
- Town
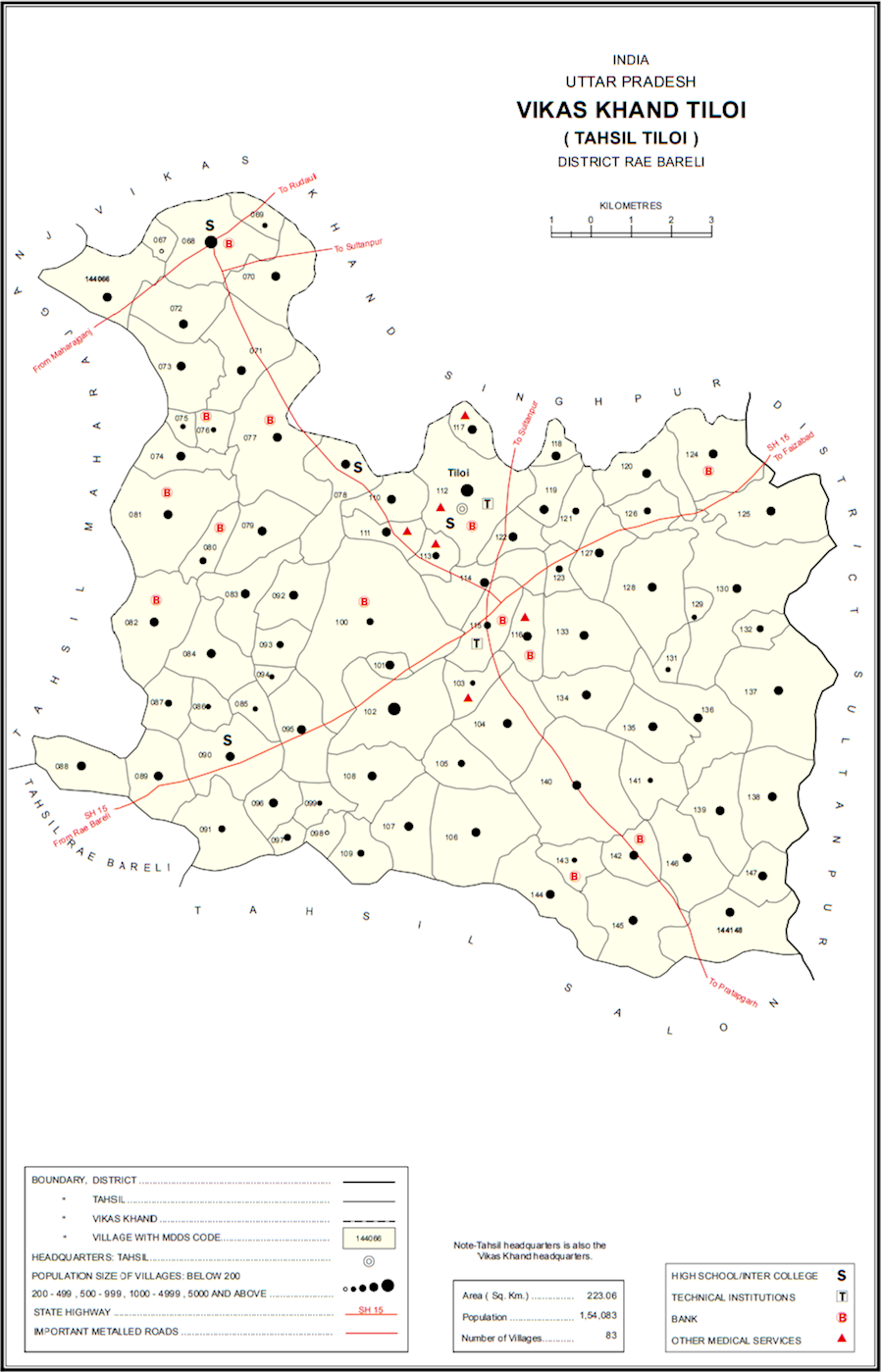
- Map of Tiloi CD block

- Location in Uttar Pradesh, India
- Coordinates: 26.392714°N 81.475942°E
- Country: India
- State: Uttar Pradesh
- District: Amethi

Area
  - Total: 5.35 km^{2} (2.07 sq mi)

Population (2011)
  - Total: 6,956
  - Density: 1,300/km^{2} (3,370/sq mi)

Languages
  - Official: Hindi
- Time zone: UTC+5:30 (IST)
- PIN: 229308
- Vehicle registration: UP-35

Tiloi is a town and tehsil headquarters in Amethi district of Uttar Pradesh, India. Located near Mohanganj on the Jais-Inhauna road, Tiloi is notable as the historical seat of a major taluqdari estate held by the Kanhpuriya clan of Rajputs. As of 2011, its population was 6,956, in 1,257 households.

Tiloi hosts a Ramlila festival annually on Dussehra, involving a dramatic reenactment of the Ramayana.

== History ==
Tiloi was historically the seat of a large taluqdari estate held by a branch of the Kanhpuria Rajputs. At the turn of the 20th century, Tiloi was the second-largest taluqa in Raebareli district, after Khajurgaon. The Kanhpurias of Tiloi were descendants of Rahas, one of the two sons of the eponymous founder Kanh (the other branch, descended from his brother Sahas, was mostly based in what is now Pratapgarh district). Five generations after Rahas was Parshad Singh, who divided his lands among his three sons. The oldest, Janga Singh, was based at Tiloi and ruled over what was then the entire pargana of Jais. (This corresponds with the later parganas of Rokha-Jais, Simrauta, Mohanganj, and Gaura-Jamun in what is now Sultanpur district.) Janga Singh's brothers were based at Ateha and Simrauta respectively.

The Tiloi estate was first divided upon the death of Janga Singh's grandson, Jagdis Rai. His younger son, Indrajit, inherited the territory of Gaura-Jamun and was the ancestor of several branches of the dynasty including the rajas of Katari and taluqdars of Jamun, Raisi, Baraulia, and Bhawan-Shahpur. Jagdis Rai's elder son, Mitrajit, kept Tiloi. His son, Kandhe Rai, unsuccessfully attacked the Pathans of Pahremau. Kandhe Rai's two sons, Udebhan and Gulal Sah, again divided the estate, with Udebhan receiving Tiloi and Gulal Sah receiving Shahmau. During Udebhan's reign, the Kurmis took up arms against the Kanhpurias and were not defeated until after his death.

Surat Singh, who was blind and succeeded Udebhan as raja of Tiloi sometime between 1670 and 1680, was an energetic ruler who "thoroughly established his position as head of the entire clan". He finally defeated the Kurmis and supposedly came to rule over 14 parganas. He came into conflict with the Sombansis of Pratapgarh district, but was defeated in battle by them at Hindaur. Surat Singh's successor, Gopal Singh, had a relatively unremarkable reign. He favoured his younger son, Niwal Singh, which outraged his older son, the one-eyed Mohan Singh, so much that he had Gopal Singh murdered and installed himself on the Tiloi throne by force. Mohan Singh was another energetic ruler who went on several military campaigns and lived to an old age before dying in 1743.

Mohan Singh's son Pem Singh ruled for only five years and died in 1748. His son Balbhaddar Singh, though, was a renowned warrior who joined forces with the Mughals against the Marathas and was given a mansab of 5,000, becoming one of the highest-ranking Awadhi grandees at the imperial court. Balbhaddar Singh eventually died in battle while rebelling against the Nawab of Awadh; as he was childless, one of his widows invested Chhatardhari Singh of Shahmau as the next raja of Tiloi, but this was contested by the rest of the Kanhpurias. Another widow of Balbhaddar Singh adopted Shankar Singh of Asni as heir to the Tiloi throne, and a 15-year-long war of succession followed. This was eventually resolved by a compromise where both claimants received the title of Raja, but neither was given the throne of Tiloi. However, Shankar Singh later gained control of Tiloi through peaceful means.

The messy succession meant that the Tiloi estate had become broken up, and Shankar Singh's successor Bunyad Singh inherited "only a fraction" of the large territory once held by Balbhaddar Singh. His adopted nephew Raja Jagpal Singh at first joined the Indian Rebellion of 1857 but later switched sides and joined the British, and was later rewarded with a large grant of confiscated lands. The hereditary title of Raja was confirmed by the British in 1877, and then in 1882 this was further elaborated to Raja Bahadur.

At the turn of the 20th century, Tiloi was described as a market village whose importance mainly derived from its status as the estate capital. The market was small but of some significance, and it was held twice per week on Wednesdays and Sundays. There was also a primary school and the taluqdar's residence. Its population in 1901 was 2,768 people, including 359 Muslims and a fair number of Banias.

The 1961 census recorded Tiloi (as "Teoli") as comprising 16 hamlets, with a total population of 2,205 people (1,070 male and 1,136 female), in 492 households and 481 physical houses. The area of the village was given as 1,366 acres. It had a medical practitioner and a post office at that time, as well as a government-run dispensary. The S.P.N. Higher Secondary School in Tiloi, founded in 1953, had in 1961 a faculty of 14 teachers (all male) and a student body of 341 males and 9 females. Average attendance of the biweekly market was given as about 1,000 people at the time, while attendance of the annual Ramlila festival was about 15,000.

The 1981 census recorded Tiloi as having a population of 3,682 people, in 874 households, and having an area of 552.41 hectares.

== Villages ==
Tiloi CD block has the following 83 villages:

Village name	Total land area (hectares)	Population (in 2011)
Thokarpur	303.5	2,707
Maheshpur	43.1	99
Semrauta	617.2	6,243
Pure Laximan Dei	28.6	228
Basantpur	311.5	1,990
Rajapur Halim	367	1,469
Satgawan	292.6	2,747
Ambarpur Farsi	289.2	2,188
Ramnagar	166.9	1,389
Kisunpur	63.6	374
Pure Baheliya	76.8	478
Kamae	630.5	3,816
Chingahi	736.6	1,768
Bhadmar	288.7	2,038
Revata Deeh	90.3	671
Biraj	559.4	3,716
Bhadsana	426.2	1,862
Ashapur Gari	295.4	2,026
Kotwa	225.6	1,544
Saidpur	103.1	474
Karaunka	96.4	378
Pure Dwandi	203.8	518
Sijni	272	1,210
Ondeeh	272	2,115
Alaipur	393.9	1,632
Chhichha	283.2	996
Besarwa	216.4	1,484
Pure Manimanohar	133.5	959
Pure Manga	57.2	294
Baghauna	260.3	1,291
Uttarpara	189.4	1,263
Chaura	67.4	507
Rajwapur	86.6	191
Dhanhuwa	72.4	349
Satwa	93.6	743
Ramae	395.1	2,529
Pakar Gaon	1,054.5	6,266
Chetra Khurd	105.3	384
Chetra Bujurg	426.8	3,836
Bardharme	195.3	960
Saimbasi	472.5	2,420
Sangrampur	180.4	1,053
Barkot	373.3	2,428
Savitapur	158.8	849
Pashchim Tiloi	166.3	1,042
Devkali	242.4	1,127
Tiloi (block headquarters)	535	6,956
Sangipur	98	742
Ashapur Ruru	132.8	3,477
Bhelai Khurd	189.9	736
Bhelai Kalan	220.4	3,120
Kutmara	113.7	1,026
Rajanpur	88.2	1,052
Lodhwariya	181.2	2,073
Ariyawan	177.9	2,437
Saraiya	139.1	747
Nasaratpur	178	1,069
Kamapur	64.6	570
Chathuwa	334.5	3,482
Marhauna	342	3,530
Khanapur Ban	133.2	781
Rajamau	256.5	2,171
Garehari	458.4	3,085
Jagdishpur	41.4	435
Jamurwa	672.1	4,533
Murtajapur	63.9	436
Todarpur	77.4	533
Hanswa	394	2,326
Asni	241.9	2,244
Dhorhanpur	447.8	3,586
Lihi	271.9	1,618
Ahuri	741.1	4,606
Meera Mau	212.1	1,350
Berara	270.4	2,195
Koora	912.4	4,722
Narayanpur	133.2	467
Shah Mau	144.4	1,647
Balapur	111.5	437
Janapur	249.5	2,221
Agauna	442.3	2,478
Bhagirathpur	302.1	2,743
Tama Mau	148.3	1,577
Belwa Hasanpur	400	2,224
