= Kanhpuriya =

Kanhpuriya or Kanhvanshi
Languages
- Hindi and Awadhi

Religion
- Hinduism

Kanhpuriya or Kanhvanshi are a dynasty of Kshatriyas (Rajput). They are from the Chandravansh. Maharaja Kanhdev was the originator of Kanhpuria dynasty, by the name of Maharaja Kanhdev and due to residence in Kanhpur (situated in Salon Rae Bareli on the banks of river Sai). This dynasty is known as Kanhpuria or Kanhvanshi.

Kanpur city was founded by Maharaja Kanhdev in the year 1217. Kanpur is a distorted name of Kanhpur. Most historians consider Maharaja Kanhdev to be the founder of Kanpur.

Kanhapuria Kshatriyas are mainly found in Amethi, Rae Bareli, Pratapgarh, Sultanpur of Awadh and some villages are found in Kaushambi, Jaunpur, Prayagraj, Riva Satna districts of MP, Bihar and in Nepal, Mahottari rural municipality, village Damhi.

== History ==
Maharaja Kanhadev's father Raja Karnadev was a commander in the army of Raja Jaichand Gaharwar of Kannauj. In the battle of Chandawar, he fought against Mohammad Ghori and killed the enemy commander Abdul Rahim, but Raja Karnadev was also martyred in the war. When King Karnadev was killed, Maharaja Kanhadev was in his childhood, Father Raja Karnadev was married to Bindumati (Bhagwant Kunwari Gaharwar daughter of Raja Manik Chand Gaharwar, whose son was Maharaja Kanhadev, Raja Manik Chand was the maternal grandfather of Maharaja Kanhadev. In childhood, Kanhadev received education in scriptures and weapons from Rishi Sukshma Muni in Gogaso Ashram Raebareli. When he became young, Kanhadev asked Guru Sukshma Muni, "What should I do now?" Gurudev blessed him and said, "You are the originator of the new Kanhapuria Kshatriya dynasty." Be "and expand your empire for seven days and will be victorious"

Then Maharaja Kanhadev took his army and established his kingdom in 14 Parganas of Awadh. Maharaja Kanhdev made Kanhpur the capital of his kingdom on the banks of river Sai and after the expansion of the empire, in 1217 he established Kanhpur (today's city of Kanpur) on the banks of river Ganga, but later he donated the land of Kanpur to a Brahmin, due to which descendants of Maharaja Kanhadev are not found in Kanpur.

Maharaja Kanhdev was the grandson of Raja Manik Chand Gaharwar. According to some information, he also inherited Manikpur from his maternal grandfather, but due to some reasons, Maharaja Kanhdev left the throne of Manikpur,

He married twice, first to the daughter of Visen Kshatriya dynasty of Majhauli State, second to the daughter of Trilokchandi Bais Kshatriya clan of Hajipur State, Bihar. He had three sons Raja Sahas, Raja Rahas and Raja Udaan

King Sahas established the kingdom of Kathola and his descendants established the kingdoms of Karhiya and Nayan.

Raja Rahas established the kingdom in Gaura Katari region, his descendants established estates like Katari, Chandapur, Simrauta, Tiloi, Shahmau, Tekari, Dakhinwara, Bhuvanshahpur, Hargaon, Atheha, Rajapur, Umrar, Jamo, Baraulia, Resi.

Later, there were many Babuans related to these concessions which were inherited by the kings of the princely states to their sons who had the title of Babu like Bhagirathpur, Berara, Goriyaabad, Gangagarh, Miramau, Mukhetiya, Chiluli, Pichura Kot, Gopalpur, etc.

There were many warriors among the Kanhapuria Kshatriyas who fought against the invading Mughals, Nawabs and the British and protected the country, religion and people.
