= Gaimau =

Gaimau Gāimau
- Village
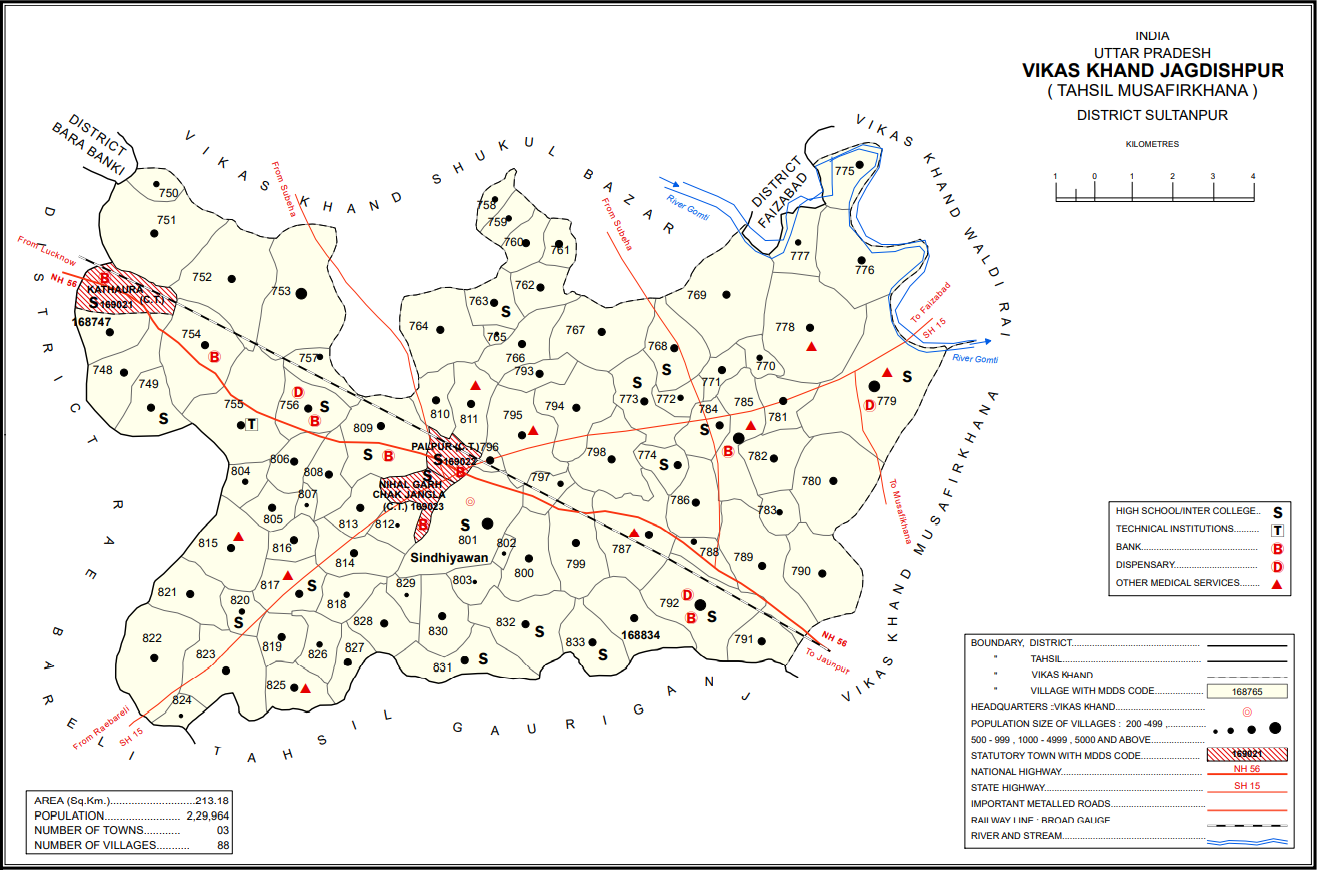
- Map showing Gaimau (#168834) in Jagdishpur CD block

- Location in Uttar Pradesh, India
- Coordinates: 26.427998°N 81.669326°E
- Country: India
- State: Uttar Pradesh
- Division: Faizabad division
- District: Sultanpur

Area
  - Total: 2.556 km^{2} (0.987 sq mi)

Population (2011)
  - Total: 1,617
  - Density: 632.6/km^{2} (1,639/sq mi)

Languages
  - Official: Hindi, Urdu
- Time zone: UTC+5:30 (IST)

Gaimau is a village in Jagdishpur block of Sultanpur district, Uttar Pradesh, India. It is located 50 km from Sultanpur, the district headquarters. As of 2011, it has a population of 1,617 people, in 255 households. It has one primary school and no healthcare facilities and does not host a permanent market or weekly haat. It belongs to the nyaya panchayat of Harimau.

The 1951 census recorded Gaimau (as "Gai Mau") as comprising 6 hamlets, with a total population of 571 people (284 male and 287 female), in 124 households and 123 physical houses. The area of the village was given as 662 acres. 28 residents were literate, all male. The village was listed as belonging to the pargana of Jagdishpur and the thana of Jagdishpur.

The 1961 census recorded Gaimau as comprising 6 hamlets, with a total population of 694 people (301 male and 393 female), in 141 households and 135 physical houses. The area of the village was given as 661 acres. Gaimau was part of Jamo block then.

The 1981 census recorded Gaimau as having a population of 838 people, in 152 households, and having an area of 267.51 hectares. The main staple foods were listed as wheat and rice.

The 1991 census recorded Gaimau as having a total population of 1,051 people (556 male and 495 female), in 172 households and 171 physical houses. The area of the village was listed as 267.51 hectares. Members of the 0-6 age group numbered 208, or 20% of the total; this group was 51% male (106) and 49% female (102). Members of scheduled castes numbered 78, or 7% of the village's total population, while no members of scheduled tribes were recorded. The literacy rate of the village was 16% (125 men and 13 women, counting only people age 7 and up). 291 people were classified as main workers (274 men and 17 women), while 0 people were classified as marginal workers; the remaining 760 residents were non-workers. The breakdown of main workers by employment category was as follows: 171 cultivators (i.e. people who owned or leased their own land); 115 agricultural labourers (i.e. people who worked someone else's land in return for payment); 0 workers in livestock, forestry, fishing, hunting, plantations, orchards, etc.; 0 in mining and quarrying; 0 household industry workers; 0 workers employed in other manufacturing, processing, service, and repair roles; 0 construction workers; 0 employed in trade and commerce; 0 employed in transport, storage, and communications; and 5 in other services.
