= Gaura, Jamo =

Gaura
- Village
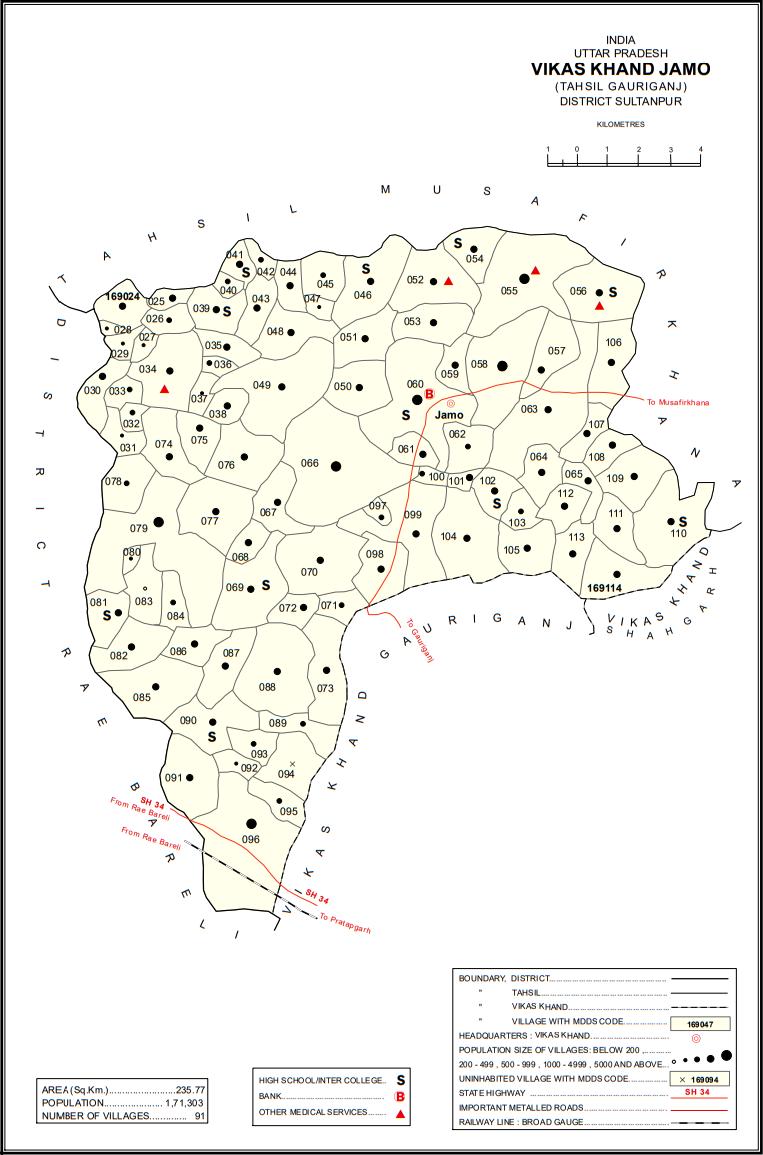
- Map showing Gaura (#052) in Jamo CD block

- Location in Uttar Pradesh, India
- Coordinates: 26.400771°N 81.675882°E
- Country: India
- State: Uttar Pradesh
- Division: Faizabad division
- District: Amethi

Area
  - Total: 4.887 km^{2} (1.887 sq mi)

Population (2011)
  - Total: 4,349
  - Density: 889.9/km^{2} (2,305/sq mi)

Languages
  - Official: Hindi, Urdu
- Time zone: UTC+5:30 (IST)

Gaura is a village in Jamo block of Amethi district, Uttar Pradesh, India. The namesake of the historical pargana of Gaura Jamun, Gaura consists of a main site called Gaura khas in the northeast surrounded by several smaller hamlets. The village lands are fertile and contain many orchard groves. In the east-central part there is a large jhil which provides a convenient source of irrigation but also sometimes overflows and floods the surrounding fields. Gaura is located just north of Jamo on the Gauriganj-Jagdishpur road, and another road also leads off to Musafirkhana.

As of 2011, Gaura has a population of 4,349 people, in 700 households. It has 3 primary schools and a family welfare centre and it does not host a regular market or weekly haat. It serves as the seat of a nyaya panchayat which also includes 6 other villages.

== History ==
At the turn of the 20th century, Gaura was described as a fairly large but otherwise rather insignificant village that belonged to the taluqdari estate of Katari. It had a primary school, and an area of high nazul land indicated that there also used to be a fort here. As of 1901, Gaura's population was 1,448 people, of which the majority were Ahirs and also including a Muslim minority of 131.

The 1951 census recorded Gaura as comprising 17 hamlets, with a total population of 1,731 people (824 male and 907 female), in 368 households and 366 physical houses. The area of the village was given as 1,282 acres. 146 residents were literate, 126 male and 20 female. The village was listed as belonging to the pargana of Gaura Jamo and the thana of Jagdishpur. The village had a district board-run primary school with 177 students in attendance as of 1 January 1951.

The 1961 census recorded Gaura as comprising 22 hamlets, with a total population of 1,770 people (889 male and 881 female), in 381 households and 356 physical houses. The area of the village was given as 1,282 acres and it had a post office at that point.

The 1981 census recorded Gaura as having a population of 2,557 people, in 465 households, and having an area of 518.83 hectares. The main staple foods were listed as wheat and rice.

The 1991 census recorded Gaura as having a total population of 2,795 people (1,435 male and 1,360 female), in 523 households and 515 physical houses. The area of the village was listed as 490.00 hectares. Members of the 0-6 age group numbered 556, or 20% of the total; this group was 53% male (294) and 47% female (262). Members of scheduled castes numbered 430, or 15% of the village's total population, while no members of scheduled tribes were recorded. The literacy rate of the village was 32% (579 men and 148 women, counting only people age 7 and up). 837 people were classified as main workers (687 men and 150 women), while 145 people were classified as marginal workers (5 men and 140 women); the remaining 1,813 residents were non-workers. The breakdown of main workers by employment category was as follows: 392 cultivators (i.e. people who owned or leased their own land); 256 agricultural labourers (i.e. people who worked someone else's land in return for payment); 12 workers in livestock, forestry, fishing, hunting, plantations, orchards, etc.; 0 in mining and quarrying; 45 household industry workers; 4 workers employed in other manufacturing, processing, service, and repair roles; 0 construction workers; 77 employed in trade and commerce; 8 employed in transport, storage, and communications; and 43 in other services.
