= Shahmau =

Shahmau Shāhmau
- Village
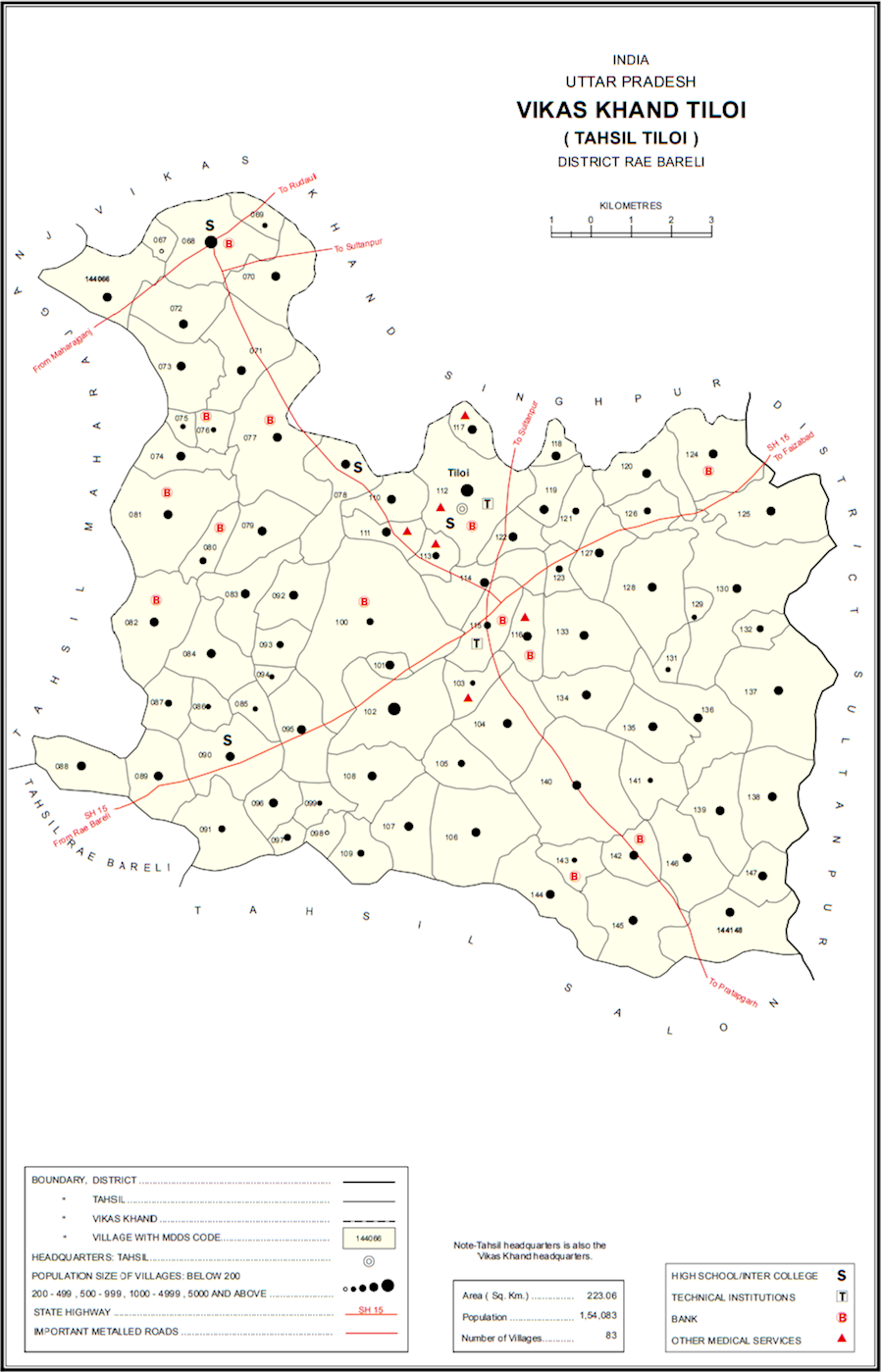
- Map showing Shahmau (#142) in Tiloi CD block

- Location in Uttar Pradesh, India
- Coordinates: 26.315492°N 81.514807°E
- Country India: India
- State: Uttar Pradesh
- District: Amethi

Area
  - Total: 1.444 km^{2} (0.558 sq mi)

Population (2011)
  - Total: 1,647
  - Density: 1,141/km^{2} (2,954/sq mi)

Languages
  - Official: Hindi
- Time zone: UTC+5:30 (IST)
- PIN: 229308
- Vehicle registration: UP-35

Shahmau is a village panchayat in Tiloi block of district Amethi, Uttar Pradesh, India. It is located 22 km (14 mi) from Gauriganj the district headquarters Amethi , on the road from Mohanganj to Jais. Historically, Shahmau was the taluqdari (state) held by a branch of the Kanhpuria Kshatriya (Rajput), the Ruler taluqdars bore the hereditary title of Raja. As of 2011, its population is 1,647, in 286 households.

Shahmau hosts a large Ramlila festival annually on Dussehra, involving a dramatic reenactment of the Ramayana. Vendors bring cloth, metal utensils, earthenware pottery, toys, and bangles to sell at the fair.

History

Shahmau was the estate of Kanhpuria Kshatriya, In the 11th generation of Maharaja Kanhdev, the first king of Tiloi state was Raja Kandhe rai, his fourth younger son Raja Gulal Shah got Shahmau Raj in succession, the area was named Shahmau after Raja Gulal Shah and his son Babu Kalyan Shah,

Bhagirathpur is the family of Shahmau Raj, in this Bhagirathpur there were staunch Hindu brave warriors like Babu Jang Bahadur Singh, who did not allow Hindu religion to bow down even in the cruel Nawabi rule of Faizabad.

Shahmau had pious kings like Raja Dirgaj Singh, who saw Maa Ashtabhuja in a dream and said take me from here, later Raja Dirgaj Singh goes to the place where the excavation was going on, from there he returns to Shahmau with the idol. And they build temples outside the shahmau fort.

== History ==
Shahmau was historically the seat of a taluqdari estate held by a branch of the Kanhpuria Rajputs.

Shahmau was the estate of Kanhpuria Kshatriya, In the 11th generation of Maharaja Kanhdev, the first king of Tiloi state was Raja Kandhe rai, his fourth younger son Raja Gulal Shah got Shahmau Raj in succession, the area was named Shahmau after Raja Gulal Shah and his son Babu Kalyan Shah,

Bhagirathpur is the family of Shahmau Raj, in this Bhagirathpur there were staunch Hindu brave warriors like Babu Jang Bahadur Singh, who did not allow Hindu religion to bow down even in the cruel Nawabi rule of Faizabad.

Shahmau had pious kings like Raja Dirgaj Singh, who saw Maa Ashtabhuja in a dream and said take me from here, later Raja Dirgaj Singh goes to the place where the excavation was going on, from there he returns to Shahmau with the idol. And they build temples outside the shahmau fort.

It was formed by a partition of the Tiloi estate between the sons of Kandhe Rai. The older son, Udebhan (who died sometime between 1670 and 1680), received Tiloi, while the younger son, Gulab Sah, received Shahmau. The reason for the establishment of the Shahmau branch had something to do with Udebhan's weak leadership. For four generations, though, the Shahmau branch remained relatively weak and essentially existed in subjection to the rajas of Tiloi.

However, when the renowned Tiloi raja Balbhaddar Singh died in battle, his widow named the fifth-generation descendant of Gulab Sah, Chhatardhari Singh, as heir to the Tiloi throne. Most of the Kanhpurias did not accept Chhatardhari Singh's claim, instead nominating Shankar Singh of Asni, and a 15-year-long war of succession followed. The eventual outcome was the consolidation of the Shahmau estate and the creation of a second title of Raja for its holder. Chhatardhari Singh's second son later went on to establish the separate Tikari estate.

At the turn of the 20th century, Shahmau was described as a small village (its population in 1901 was 671) that was dominated by the raja's house and its grounds. It had an aided school and a bazar, known as Sukhmangalganj. The village lands were divided between the Raja of Shahmau and the other Kanhpuria taluqdars of Tikari and Guriabad.

The 1961 census recorded Shahmau as comprising 10 hamlets, with a total population of 564 people (284 male and 280 female), in 127 households and 126 physical houses. The area of the village was given as 364 acres and it had a post office at the time. Average attendance of the annual Ramlila festival was then about 25,000.

The 1981 census recorded Shahmau as having a population of 757 people, in 160 households, and having an area of 146.50 hectares.
