= Nuruddinpur =

Nuruddinpur Nūruddīnpur
- Village
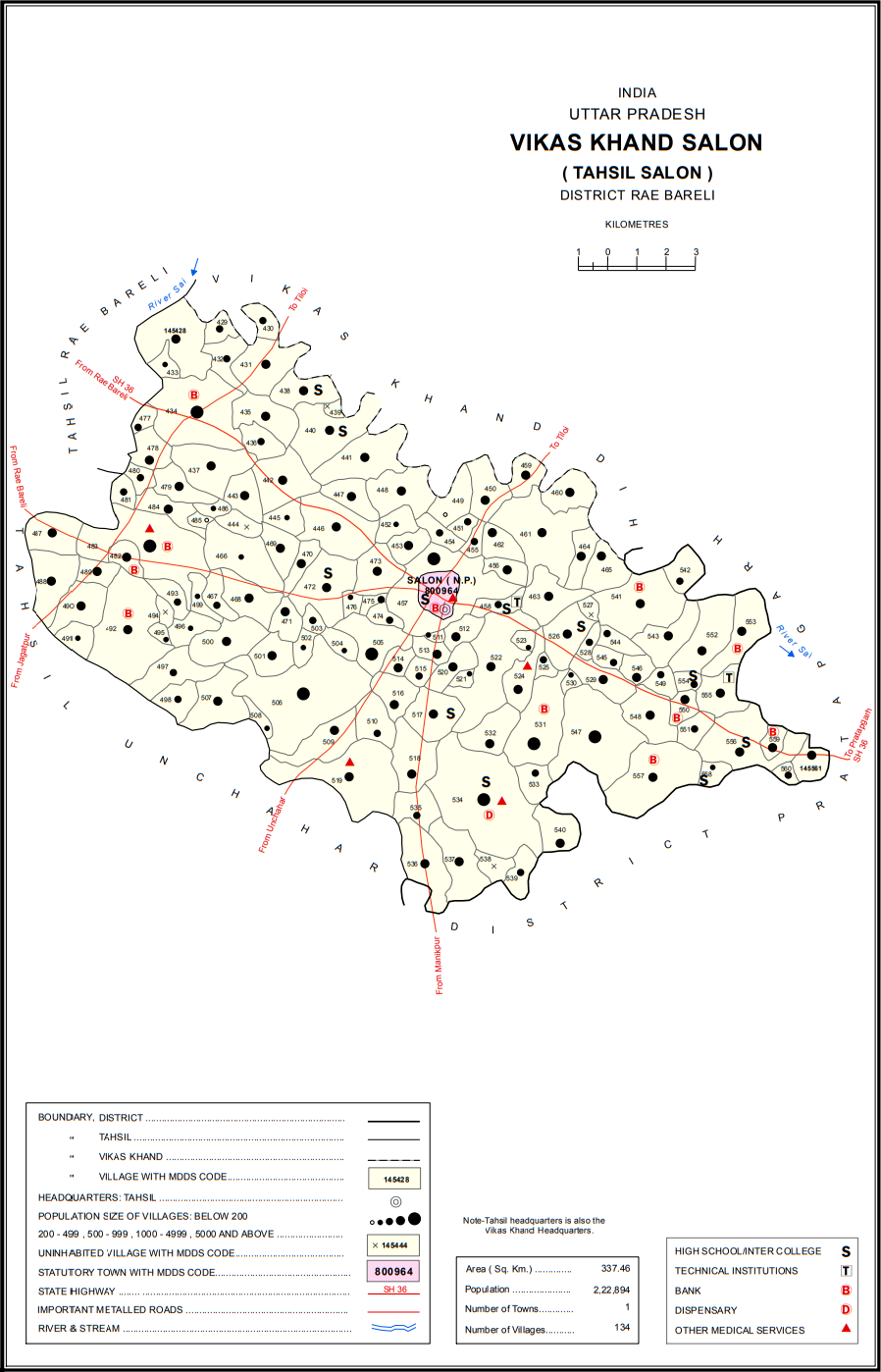
- Map showing Nuruddinpur (#556) in Salon CD block

- Location in Uttar Pradesh, India
- Coordinates: 25.987144°N 81.562333°E
- Country: India
- State: Uttar Pradesh
- District: Raebareli

Area
  - Total: 4.829 km^{2} (1.864 sq mi)

Population (2011)
  - Total: 3,882
  - Density: 803.9/km^{2} (2,082/sq mi)

Languages
  - Official: Hindi
- Time zone: UTC+5:30 (IST)
- Vehicle registration: UP-35

Nuruddinpur is a village in Salon block of Rae Bareli district, Uttar Pradesh, India. It is located 43 km from Raebareli, the district headquarters. As of 2011, Nuruddinpur has a population of 3,882 people, in 667 households. It has 2 primary schools and no healthcare facilities. It is connected to national highways and hosts a periodic haat but not a permanent market.

Nuruddinpur was historically the seat of a taluqdari estate held by a branch of the Kanhpuria Rajputs. The Nuruddinpur branch was an offshoot of the Rajas of Kaithaula (in what is now Pratapgarh district, which itself claims descent from Kanh, the dynasty's legendary founder, through his son Sahas. The Kaithaula raja Kalyan Singh had two sons; one of them, Jurawan Singh, was the one who established the Nuruddinpur branch. He supposedly gained land in the pargana of Salon by being adopted by one Bahadur Singh of Kuturia, although this Bahadur Singh is not attested anywhere else. Jageshwar Bakhsh Singh (d. 1854), a sixth-generation descendant of Jurawan Singh, was pressured into signing a deed transferring the estate to one Muazzam Khan, but his widow Babuain Qadam Kunwar secured the sanad for the estate and it remained a family possession until the 20th century.

The 1961 census recorded Nuruddinpur as comprising 12 hamlets, with a total population of 1,076 people (543 male and 533 female), in 290 households and 276 physical houses. The area of the village was given as 1,216 acres and it had access to electricity at that point. Thuthasimar The 1981 census recorded Nuruddinpur (as "Nurudinpur") as having a population of 1,829 people, in 500 households, and having an area of 491.70 hectares. The main staple foods were given as wheat and rice.
