= Pure Mani Manohar =

- Village
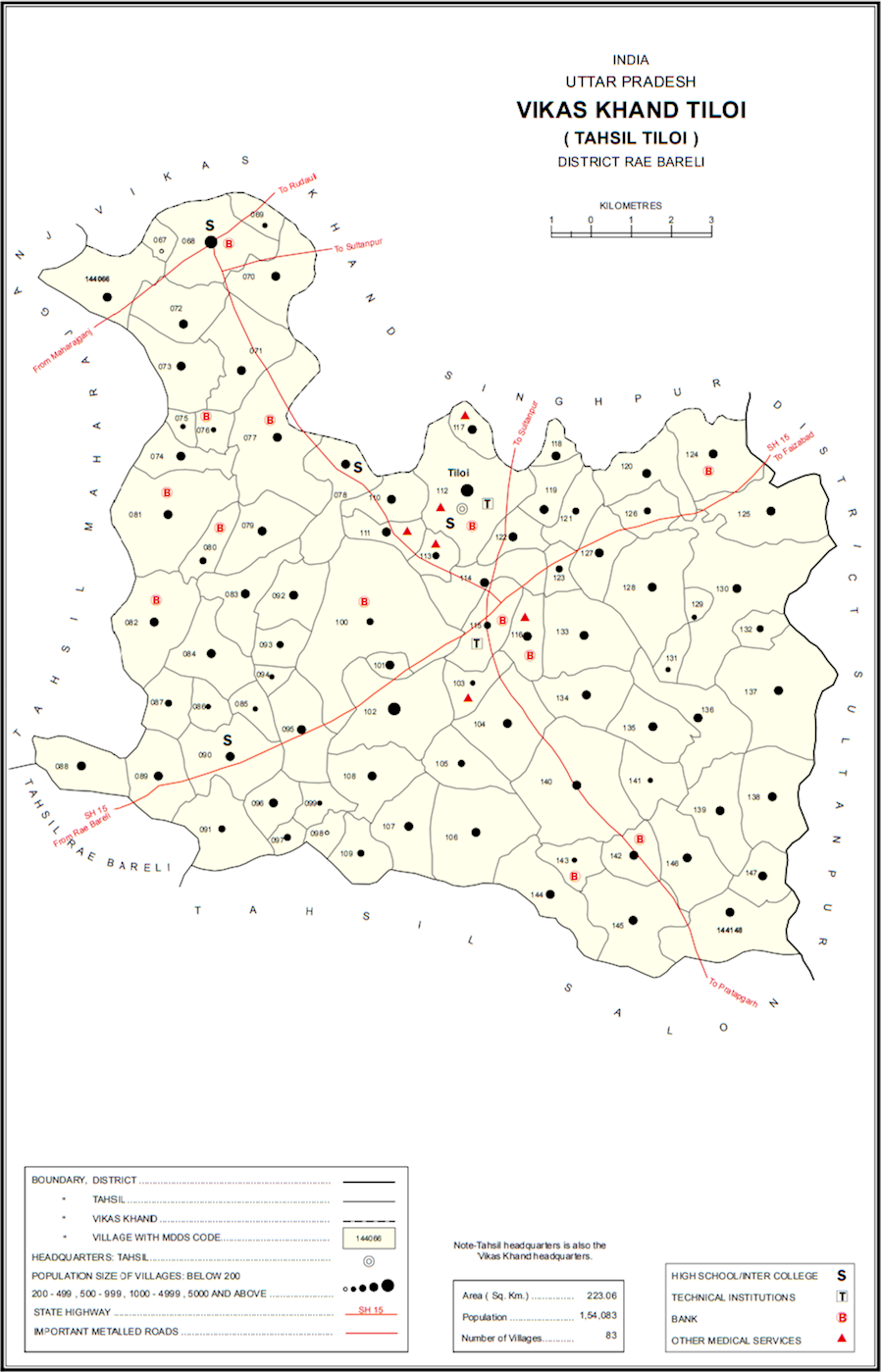
- Map showing Pure Mani Manohar (#093) in Tiloi CD block

- Location in Uttar Pradesh, India
- Coordinates: 26.363159°N 81.42934°E
- Country India: India
- State: Uttar Pradesh
- District: Raebareli

Area
  - Total: 1.335 km^{2} (0.515 sq mi)

Population (2011)
  - Total: 959
  - Density: 718/km^{2} (1,860/sq mi)

Languages
  - Official: Hindi
- Time zone: UTC+5:30 (IST)
- PIN: 229308
- Vehicle registration: UP-35

Pure Mani Manohar is a village in Tiloi block of Rae Bareli district, Uttar Pradesh, India. As of 2011, its population is 959, in 186 households. It has one primary school and no healthcare facilities.

== Name ==
Pure is a regional form of the word Purā, which is the prefix form of the common place name element -pur.

== Demographics ==
The 1981 census recorded Pure Mani Manohar as having a population of 446 people, in 90 households, and having an area of 140.43 hectares.

The 1961 census recorded Pure Mani Manohar as comprising 2 hamlets, with a total population of 351 people (180 male and 171 female), in 76 households and 71 physical houses. The area of the village was given as 346 acres.
