= Belwa Hasanpur =

- Village
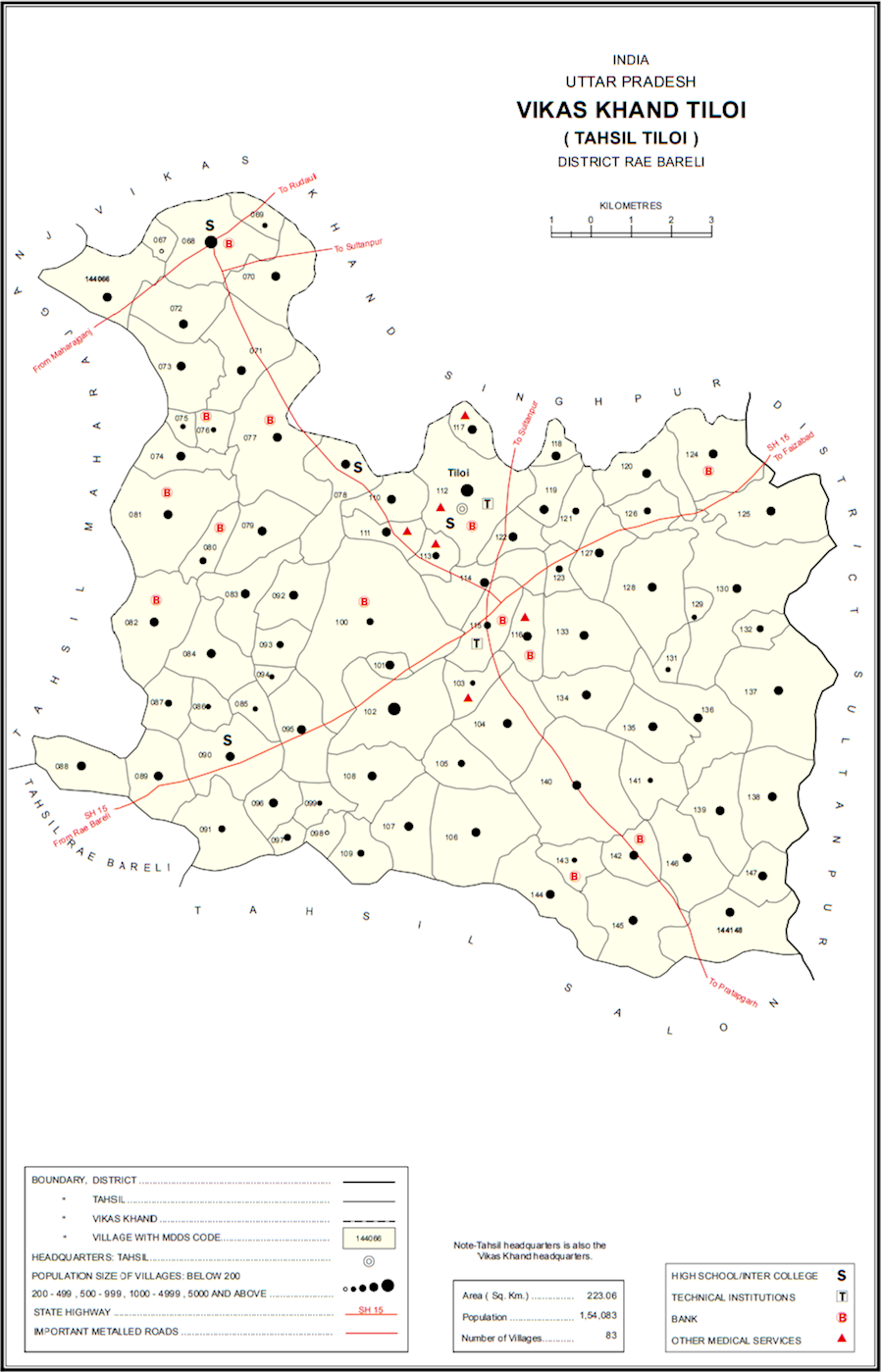
- Map showing Belwa Hasanpur (#144148) in Tiloi CD block

- Location in Uttar Pradesh, India
- Coordinates: 26.304961°N 81.53693°E
- Country India: India
- State: Uttar Pradesh
- District: Raebareli

Area
  - Total: 4.00 km^{2} (1.54 sq mi)

Population (2011)
  - Total: 2,224
  - Density: 556/km^{2} (1,440/sq mi)

Languages
  - Official: Hindi
- Time zone: UTC+5:30 (IST)
- PIN: 229308
- Vehicle registration: UP-35

Belwa Hasanpur is a village in Tiloi block of Rae Bareli district, Uttar Pradesh, India. It is located 32 km from Raebareli, the district headquarters. As of 2011, its population is 2,224, in 400 households. It has two primary schools and no healthcare facilities.

The 1961 census recorded Belwa Hasanpur as comprising 10 hamlets, with a total population of 744 people (373 male and 371 female), in 161 households and 160 physical houses. The area of the village was given as 976 acres.

The 1981 census recorded Belwa Hasanpur as having a population of 1,144 people, in 232 households, and having an area of 411.17 hectares.
