= Rajamau, Tiloi =

Rajamau Rājāmau
- Village
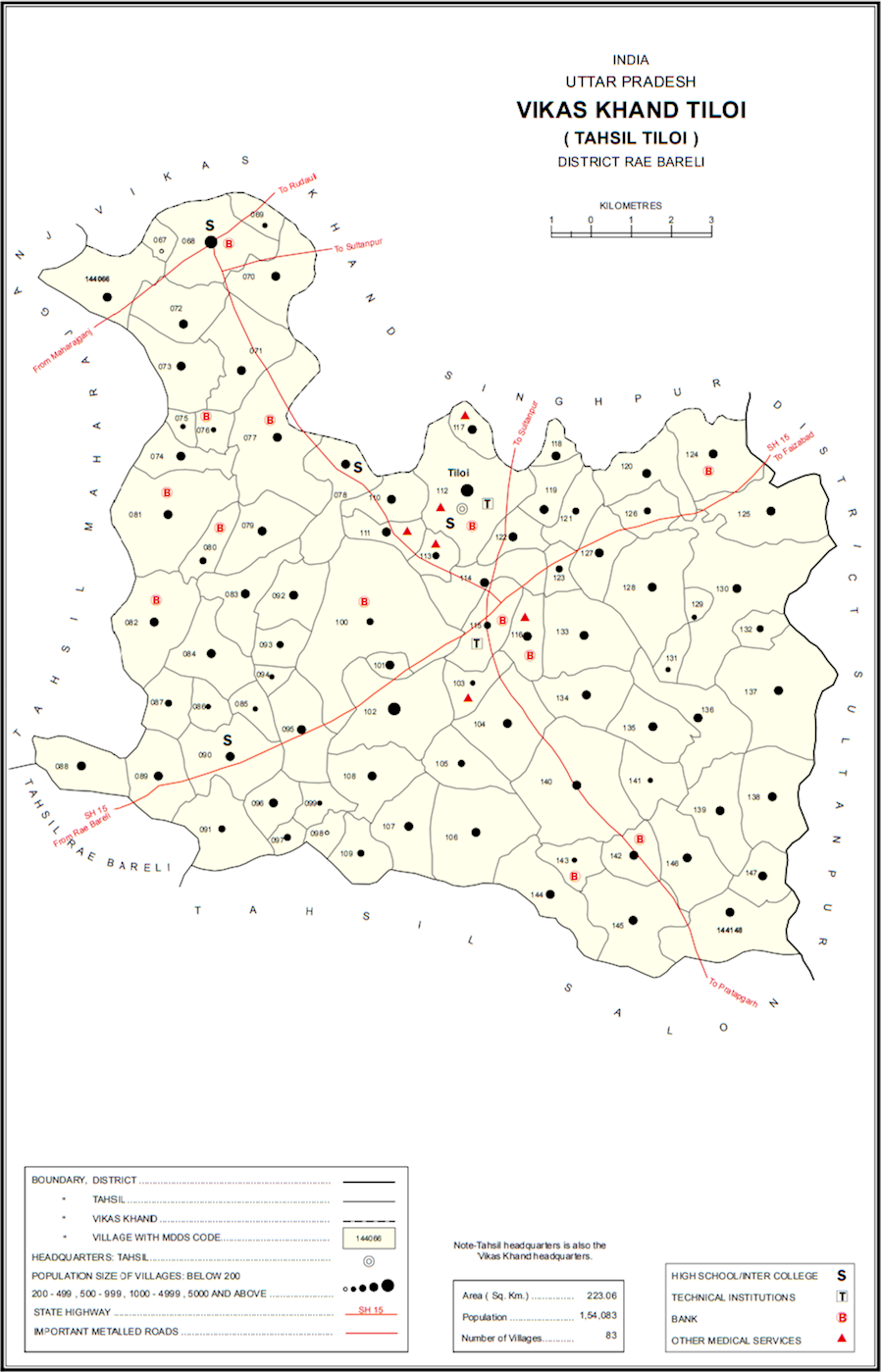
- Map showing Rajamau (#127) in Tiloi CD block

- Location in Uttar Pradesh, India
- Coordinates: 26.391365°N 81.509421°E
- Country India: India
- State: Uttar Pradesh
- District: Raebareli

Area
  - Total: 2.565 km^{2} (0.990 sq mi)

Population (2011)
  - Total: 2,171
  - Density: 846.4/km^{2} (2,192/sq mi)

Languages
  - Official: Hindi
- Time zone: UTC+5:30 (IST)
- PIN: 229308
- Vehicle registration: UP-35

Rajamau is a village in Tiloi block of Rae Bareli district, Uttar Pradesh, India. As of 2011, its population is 2,171, in 329 households. It has one primary school and no healthcare facilities.

The 1961 census recorded Rajamau as comprising 5 hamlets, with a total population of 861 people (410 male and 451 female), in 165 households and 155 physical houses. The area of the village was given as 687 acres and it had a post office at the time.

The 1981 census recorded Rajamau as having a population of 1,206 people, in 249 households, and having an area of 278.02 hectares.
