= Deenanath Sewak =

Indian politician

Deenanath Sewak (also known as Dina Nath) was a politician from the Raebareli district of Uttar Pradesh.

== Early life and family ==
He was born at Baraut in the Meerut district in a lower-middle-class family, where his father Ram Harsha Chaudhary was a head mason at a brick factory. He was originally resident in Atheha village of Pratapgarh district of Uttar Pradesh. He was married to Rajkumari and had two children, Prakash Nath Sewak and Ravindra Nath Sewak.

== Political career ==
He was elected as a Member of the Legislative Assembly from the Salon Constituency of Raebareli for two times, once from Bhartiya Kranti Dal in 1974 and once from Janta Party in 1977. He also served as Minister of Social Welfare and Minister of Rural Industries in the then Government of Uttar Pradesh. Later, he joined the Indian National Congress and was appointed as the chairman of Uttar Pradesh Rajya Bhandaragar Nigam Limited and Uttar Pradesh Upbhokta Sahkari Sangh Limited.

He contested the State Legislative Election in 1980 from Rampur Khas but lost to Pramod Tiwari. Later on, he joined the Samajwadi Janta Party after the Congress Party denied him the ticket for the upcoming elections of Uttar Pradesh Vidhan Sabha. He contested on the ticket of the Samajwadi Janta Party from the Salon Constituency but lost the seat to Dal Bahadur Kori.

After the separation of the Samajwadi Janta Party into Samajwadi Party and Janta Party, he went with the Samajwadi Party due to his closeness to Mulayam Singh Yadav. He also served as District Chairman of the Samajwadi Party in the Raebareli district for a long period.
