= Pure Manga =

- Village
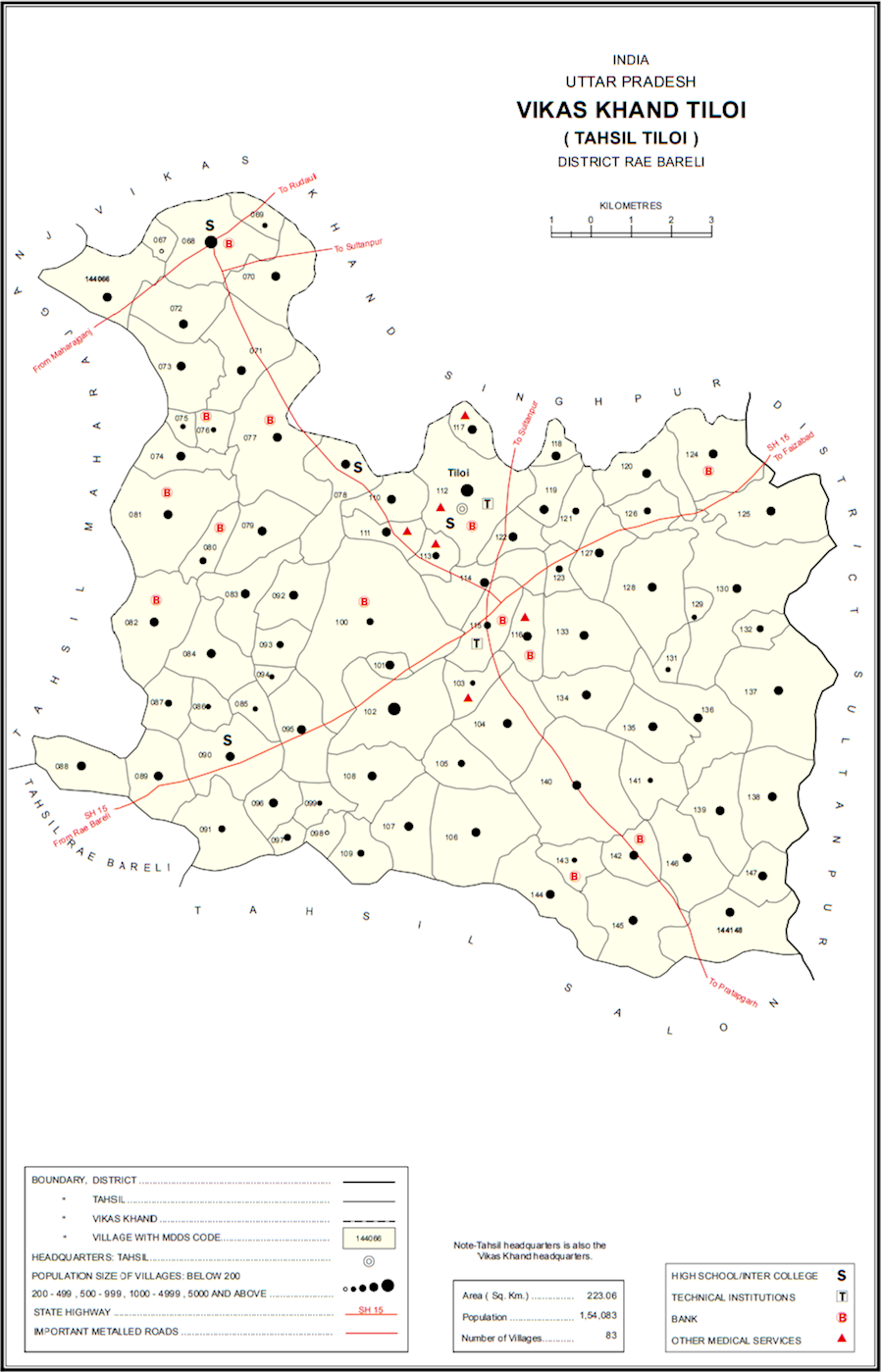
- Map showing Pure Manga (#094) in Tiloi CD block

- Location in Uttar Pradesh, India
- Coordinates: 26.356285°N 81.426846°E
- Country India: India
- State: Uttar Pradesh
- District: Raebareli

Area
  - Total: 0.572 km^{2} (0.221 sq mi)

Population (2011)
  - Total: 294
  - Density: 514/km^{2} (1,330/sq mi)

Languages
  - Official: Hindi
- Time zone: UTC+5:30 (IST)
- PIN: 229308
- Vehicle registration: UP-35

Pure Manga is a village in Tiloi block of Rae Bareli district, Uttar Pradesh, India. As of 2011, its population is 294, in 52 households. It has no schools and no healthcare facilities.

== Name ==
Pure is a regional form of the word Purā, which is the prefix form of the common place name element -pur.

== Demographics ==
The 1981 census recorded Pure Manga as having a population of 113 people, in 25 households, and having an area of 59.49 hectares.

The 1961 census recorded Pure Manga as comprising 1 hamlet, with a total population of 83 people (40 male and 43 female), in 11 households and 11 physical houses. The area of the village was given as 147 acres.
