= Pakargaon =

Pakargaon Pākargāon
- Village
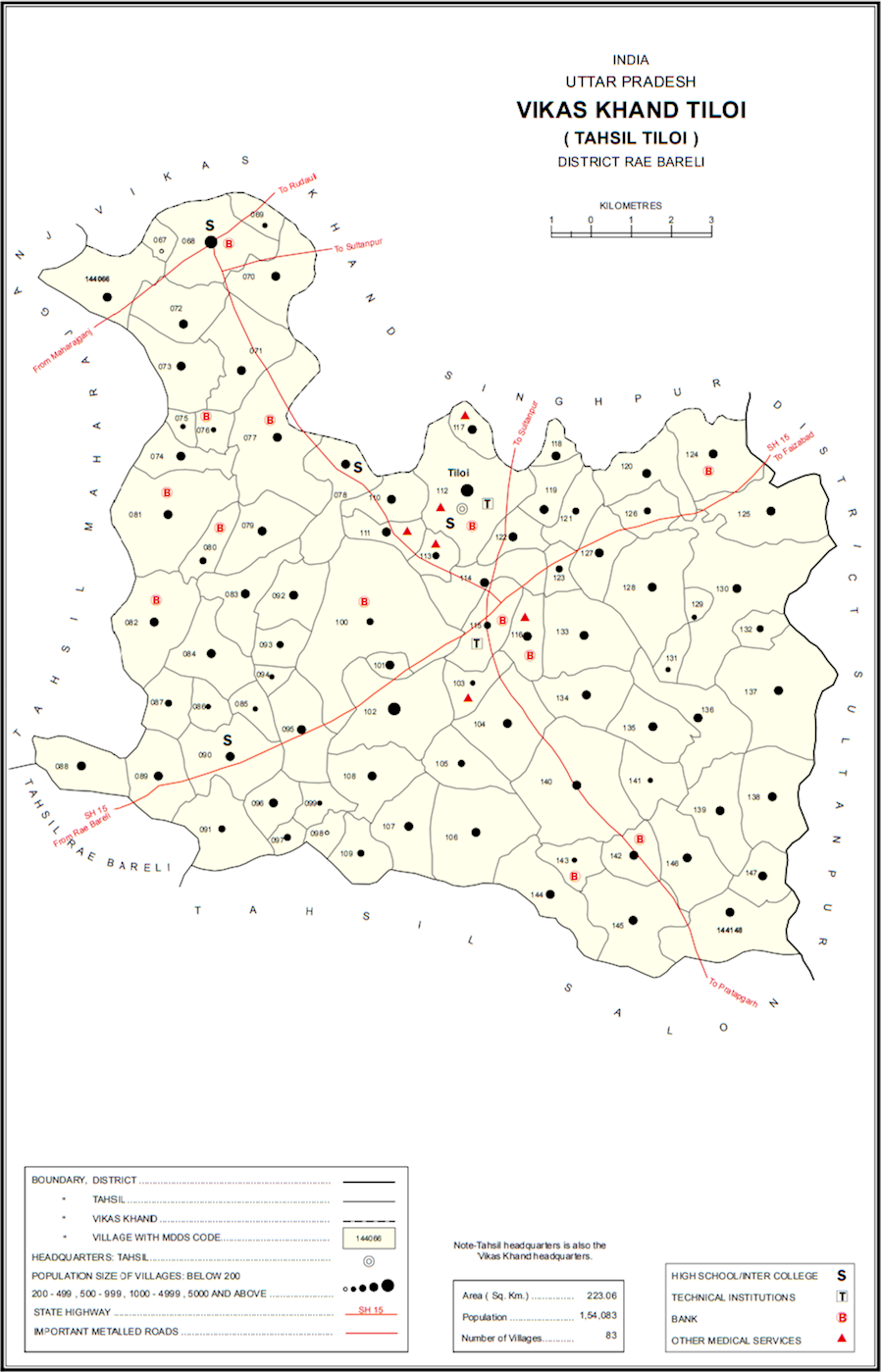
- Map showing Pakargaon (#102) in Tiloi CD block

- Location in Uttar Pradesh, India
- Coordinates: 26.371128°N 81.449159°E
- Country India: India
- State: Uttar Pradesh
- District: Raebareli

Area
  - Total: 10.545 km^{2} (4.071 sq mi)

Population (2011)
  - Total: 6,266
  - Density: 594.2/km^{2} (1,539/sq mi)

Languages
  - Official: Hindi
- Time zone: UTC+5:30 (IST)
- PIN: 229308
- Vehicle registration: UP-35

Pakargaon is a village in Tiloi block of Rae Bareli district, Uttar Pradesh, India. As of 2011, its population is 6,266, in 1,156 households. It has two primary schools and no healthcare facilities.

The 1961 census recorded Pakargaon as comprising 13 hamlets, with a total population of 2,682 people (1,316 male and 1,366 female), in 207 households and 205 physical houses. The area of the village was given as 2,604 acres and it had a post office at that point.

The 1981 census recorded Pakargaon as having a population of 3,748 people, in 741 households, and having an area of 1,054.20 hectares.
