= Bhadmar =

- Village
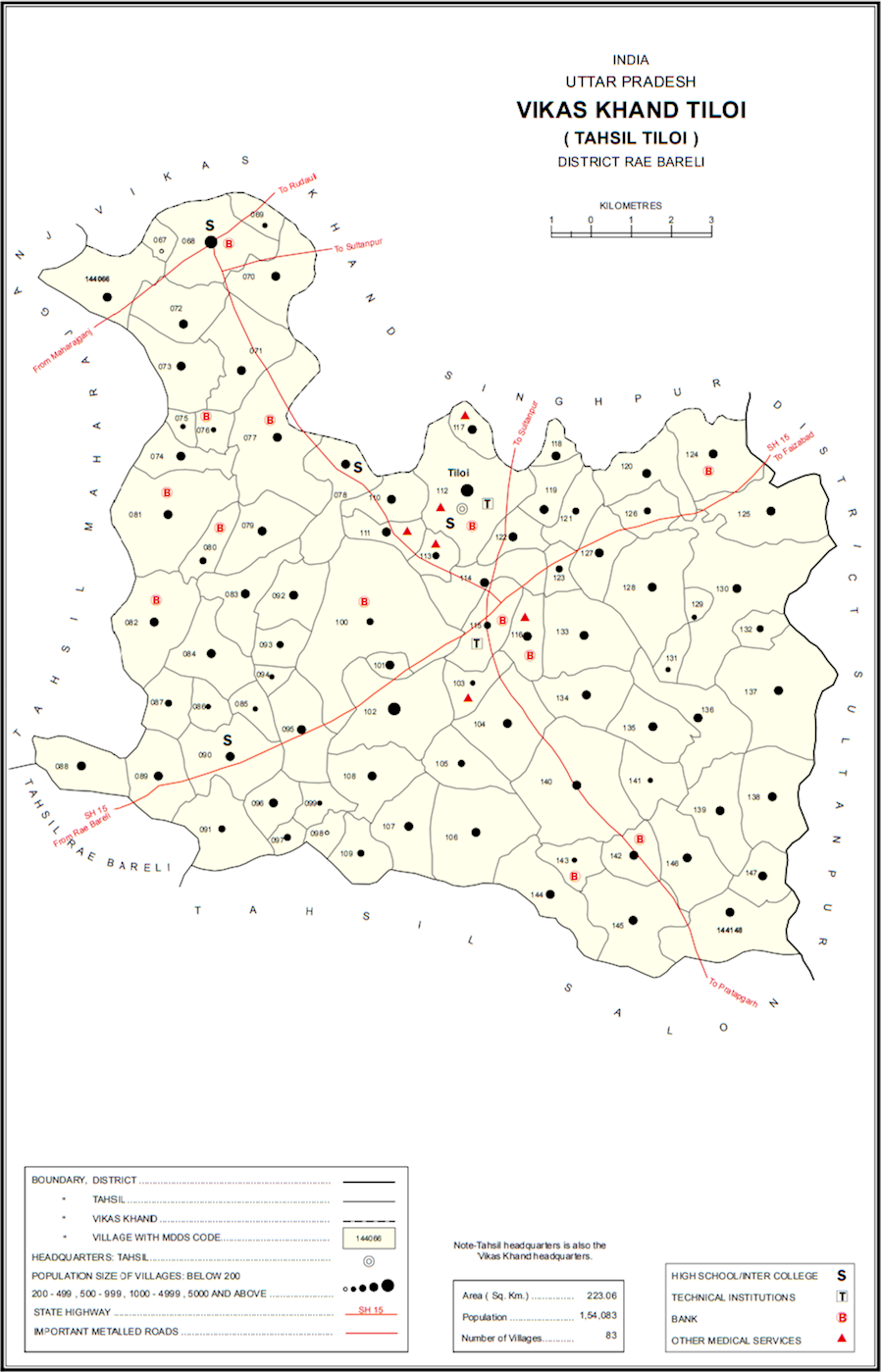
- Map showing Bhadmar (#079) in Tiloi CD block

- Location in Uttar Pradesh, India
- Coordinates: 26.392052°N 81.417511°E
- Country India: India
- State: Uttar Pradesh
- District: Raebareli

Area
  - Total: 2.887 km^{2} (1.115 sq mi)

Population (2011)
  - Total: 2,038
  - Density: 705.9/km^{2} (1,828/sq mi)

Languages
  - Official: Hindi
- Time zone: UTC+5:30 (IST)
- PIN: 229308
- Vehicle registration: UP-35

Bhadmar is a village in Tiloi block of Rae Bareli district, Uttar Pradesh, India. As of 2011, its population is 2,038, in 349 households.

The 1961 census recorded Bhadmar as comprising 8 hamlets, with a total population of 929 people (468 male and 461 female), in 180 households and 171 physical houses. The area of the village was given as 768 acres.

The 1981 census recorded Bhadmar (here spelled "Bhadmra") as having a population of 1,070 people, in 209 households, and having an area of 308.77 hectares.
