= Chingahi =

Chingahi Chingāhi
- Village
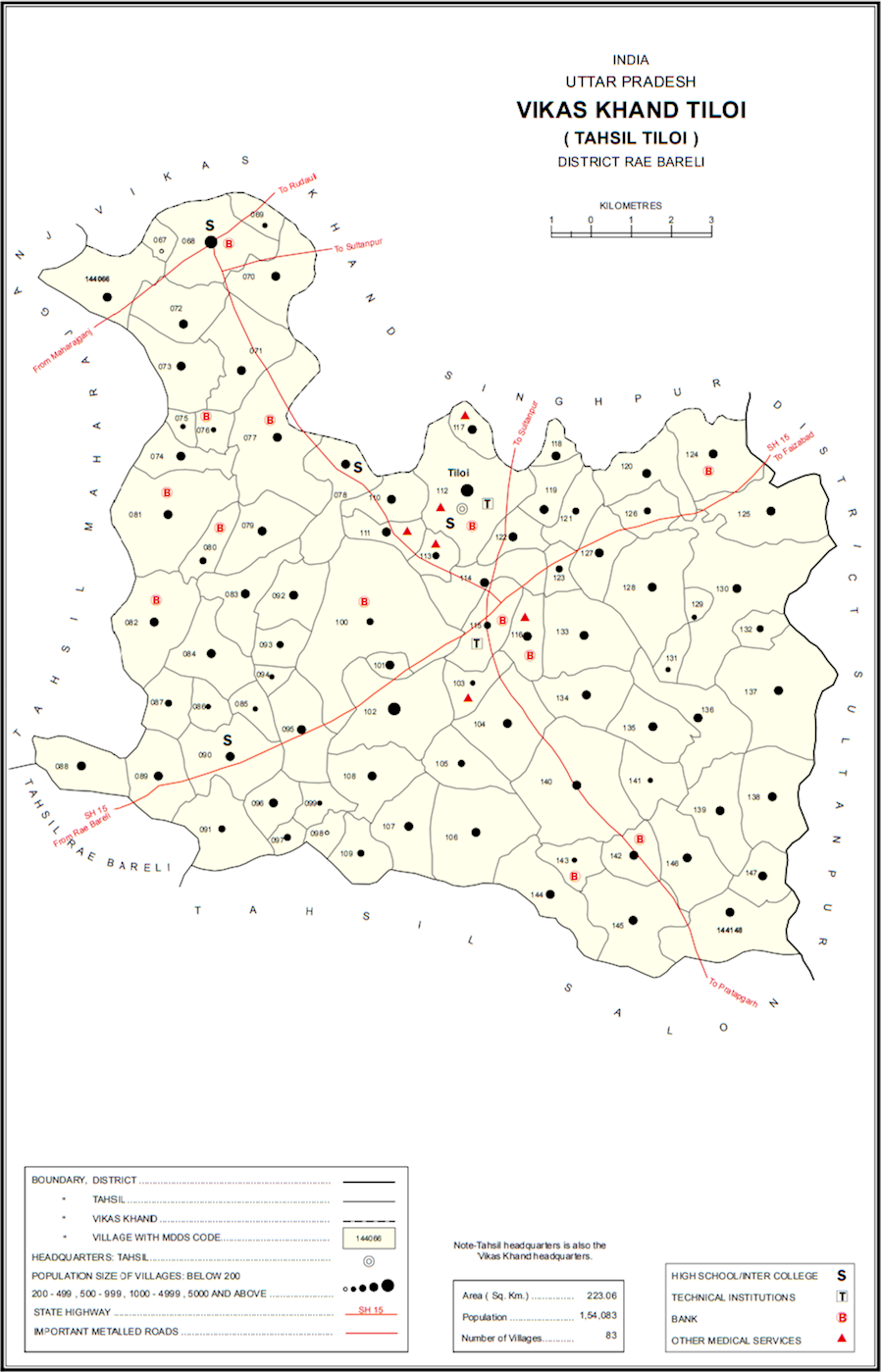
- Map showing Chingahi (#078) in Tiloi CD block

- Location in Uttar Pradesh, India
- Coordinates: 26.391206°N 81.439587°E
- Country India: India
- State: Uttar Pradesh
- District: Raebareli

Area
  - Total: 7.366 km^{2} (2.844 sq mi)

Population (2011)
  - Total: 1,768
  - Density: 240.0/km^{2} (621.7/sq mi)

Languages
  - Official: Hindi
- Time zone: UTC+5:30 (IST)
- PIN: 229308
- Vehicle registration: UP-35

Chingahi is a village in Tiloi block of Rae Bareli district, Uttar Pradesh, India. As of 2011, its population is 1,768, in 303 households. It has one primary school and no healthcare facilities.

The 1961 census recorded Chingahai as comprising 4 hamlets, with a total population of 883 people (424 male and 459 female), in 167 households and 148 physical houses. The area of the village was given as 675 acres.

The 1981 census recorded Chingahai as having a population of 1,123 people, in 200 households, and having an area of 272.76 hectares.
