= Bhadsana =

- Village
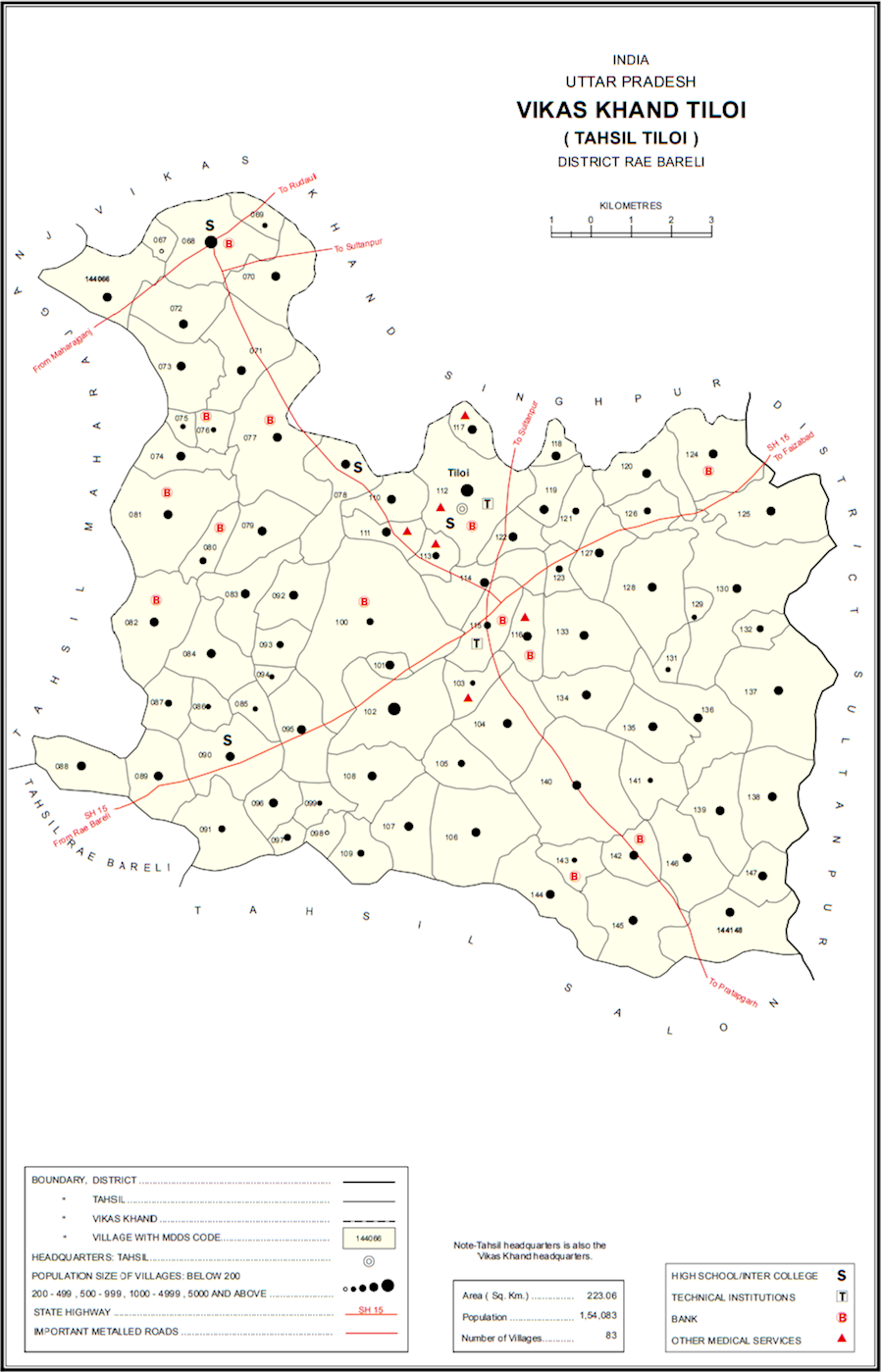
- Map showing Bhadsana (#082) in Tiloi CD block

- Location in Uttar Pradesh, India
- Coordinates: 26.366906°N 81.397562°E
- Country India: India
- State: Uttar Pradesh
- District: Raebareli

Area
  - Total: 4.262 km^{2} (1.646 sq mi)

Population (2011)
  - Total: 1,862
  - Density: 436.9/km^{2} (1,132/sq mi)

Languages
  - Official: Hindi
- Time zone: UTC+5:30 (IST)
- PIN: 229308
- Vehicle registration: UP-35

Bhadsana is a village in Tiloi block of Rae Bareli district, Uttar Pradesh, India. As of 2011, its population is 1,862, in 343 households.

The 1961 census recorded Bhadsana as comprising 7 hamlets, with a total population of 880 people (454 male and 426 female), in 203 households and 194 physical houses. The area of the village was given as 1,103 acres.

The 1981 census recorded Bhadsana as having a population of 1,132 people, in 235 households, and having an area of 447.18 hectares.
