= Ahuri =

Ahuri Āhūri
- Village
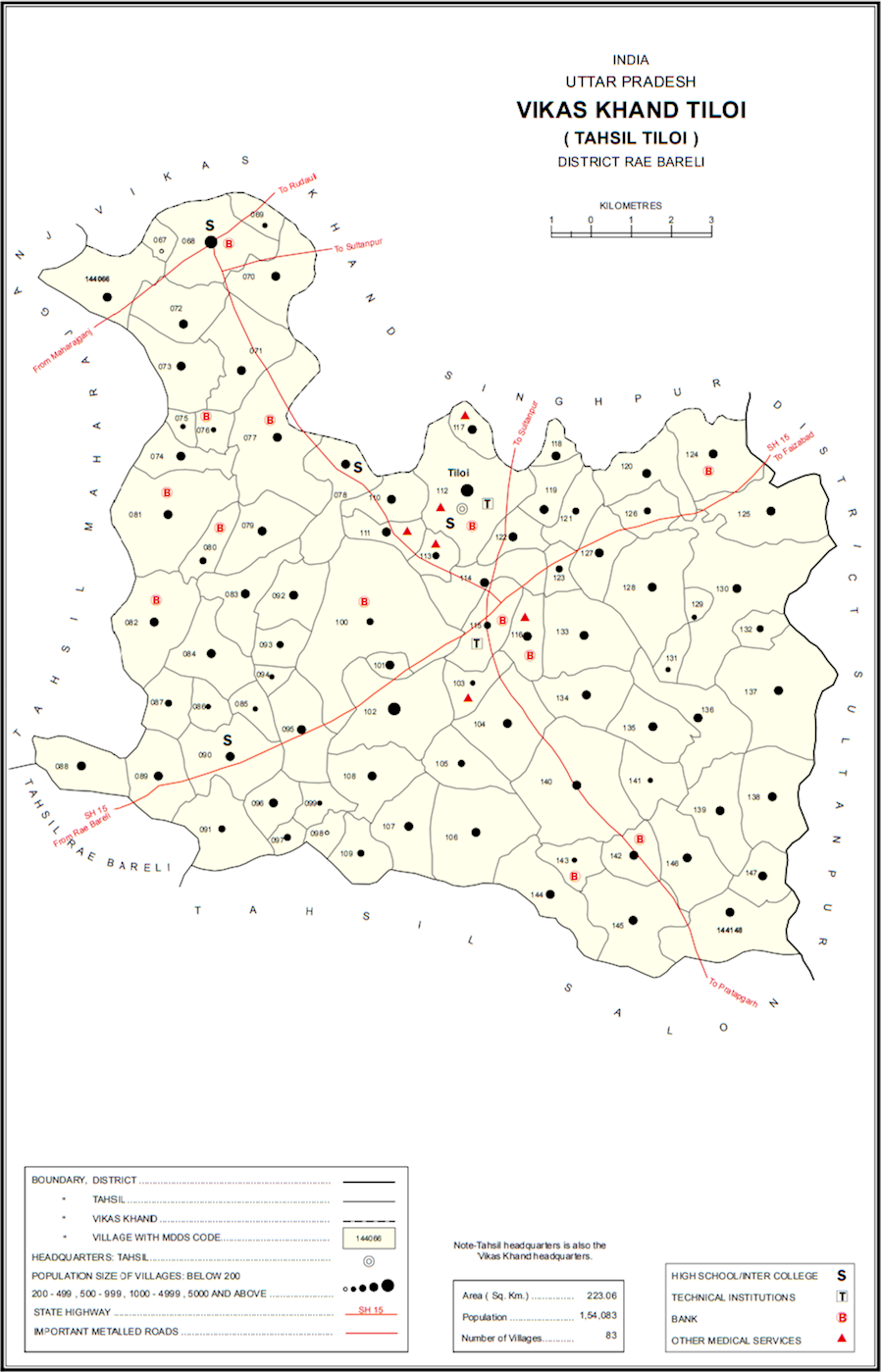
- Map showing Ahuri (#137) in Tiloi CD block

- Location in Uttar Pradesh, India
- Coordinates: 26.358414°N 81.550148°E
- Country India: India
- State: Uttar Pradesh
- District: Raebareli

Area
  - Total: 7.411 km^{2} (2.861 sq mi)

Population (2011)
  - Total: 4,606
  - Density: 621.5/km^{2} (1,610/sq mi)

Languages
  - Official: Hindi
- Time zone: UTC+5:30 (IST)
- PIN: 229308
- Vehicle registration: UP-35

Ahuri is a village in Tiloi block of Rae Bareli district, Uttar Pradesh, India. As of 2011, its population is 1,647, in 286 households. It has one primary school and no healthcare facilities.

The 1961 census recorded Ahuri as comprising 23 hamlets, with a total population of 2,193 people (1,093 male and 1,100 female), in 497 households and 478 physical houses. The area of the village was given as 1,939 acres and it had a post office at the time.

The 1981 census recorded Ahuri as having a population of 2,879 people, in 600 households, and having an area of 781.05 hectares.
