= Dakhinwara, Amethi =

Dakhinwara Dakhinwāra
- Village
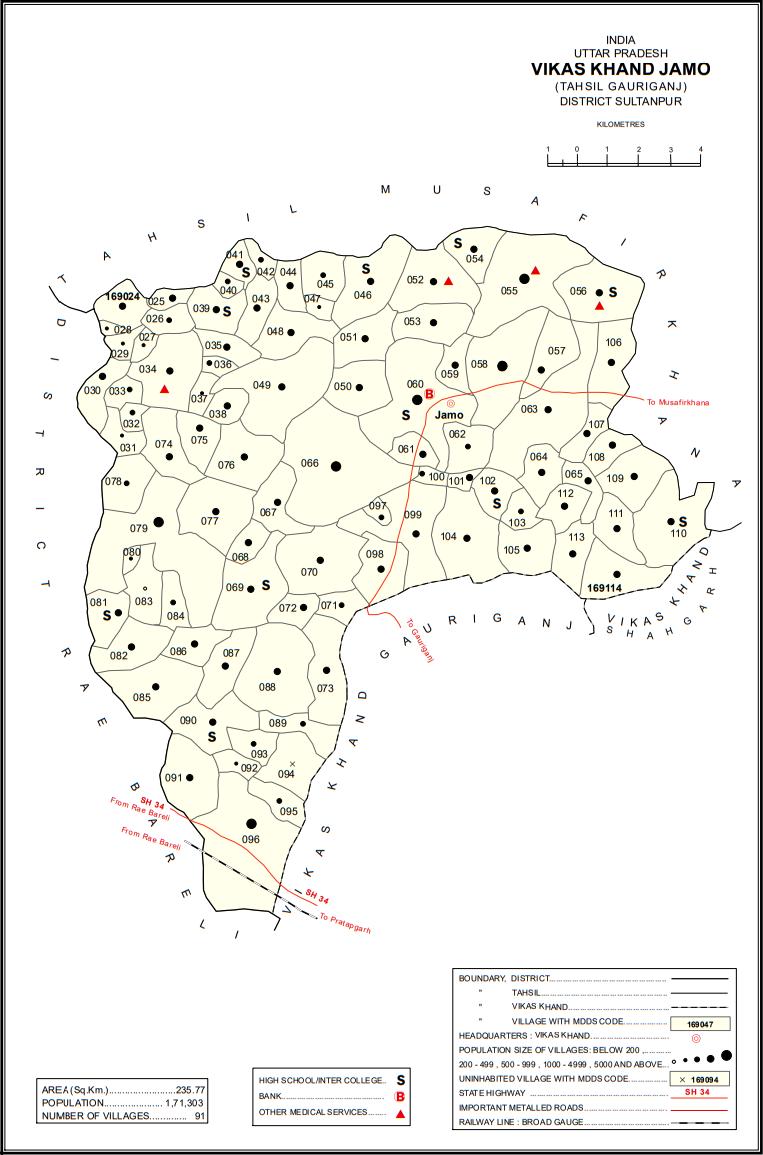
- Map showing Dakhinwara (#034) in Jamo CD block

- Location in Uttar Pradesh, India
- Coordinates: 26.384175°N 81.579738°E
- Country: India
- State: Uttar Pradesh
- Division: Faizabad division
- District: Amethi

Area
  - Total: 3.804 km^{2} (1.469 sq mi)

Population (2011)
  - Total: 3,840
  - Density: 1,010/km^{2} (2,610/sq mi)

Languages
  - Official: Hindi, Urdu
- Time zone: UTC+5:30 (IST)

Dakhinwara is a village in Jamo block of Amethi district, Uttar Pradesh, India. As of 2011, it has a population of 3,840 people, in 613 households. It has two primary schools and one maternity and child welfare centre and it hosts a weekly haat but not a periodic market. It belongs to the nyaya panchayat of Jamo.

The 1951 census recorded Dakhinwara (as "Dakhin Wara") as comprising 16 hamlets, with a total population of 1,309 people (664 male and 645 female), in 270 households and 265 physical houses. The area of the village was given as 966 acres. 67 residents were literate, 64 male and 3 female. The village was listed as belonging to the pargana of Gaura Jamo and the thana of Jagdishpur. The village had a district board-run primary school with 111 students in attendance as of 1 January 1951.

The 1961 census recorded Dakhinwara as comprising 19 hamlets, with a total population of 914 people (448 male and 466 female), in 298 households and 277 physical houses. The area of the village was given as 966 acres.

The 1981 census recorded Dakhinwara as having a population of 2,002 people, in 409 households, and having an area of 390.94 hectares. The main staple foods were listed as wheat and rice.

The 1991 census recorded Dakhinwara as having a total population of 2,610 people (1,290 male and 1,320 female), in 464 households and 454 physical houses. The area of the village was listed as 380.00 hectares. Members of the 0-6 age group numbered 573, or 22% of the total; this group was 52% male (297) and 48% female (276). Members of scheduled castes numbered 961, or 37% of the village's total population, while no members of scheduled tribes were recorded. The literacy rate of the village was 37% (555 men and 203 women, counting only people age 7 and up). 736 people were classified as main workers (663 men and 73 women), while 0 people were classified as marginal workers; the remaining 1,874 residents were non-workers. The breakdown of main workers by employment category was as follows: 393 cultivators (i.e. people who owned or leased their own land); 293 agricultural labourers (i.e. people who worked someone else's land in return for payment); 6 workers in livestock, forestry, fishing, hunting, plantations, orchards, etc.; 0 in mining and quarrying; 1 household industry worker; 6 workers employed in other manufacturing, processing, service, and repair roles; 0 construction workers; 10 employed in trade and commerce; 0 employed in transport, storage, and communications; and 27 in other services.
