= Katari, Amethi =

Katari Katāri
- Village
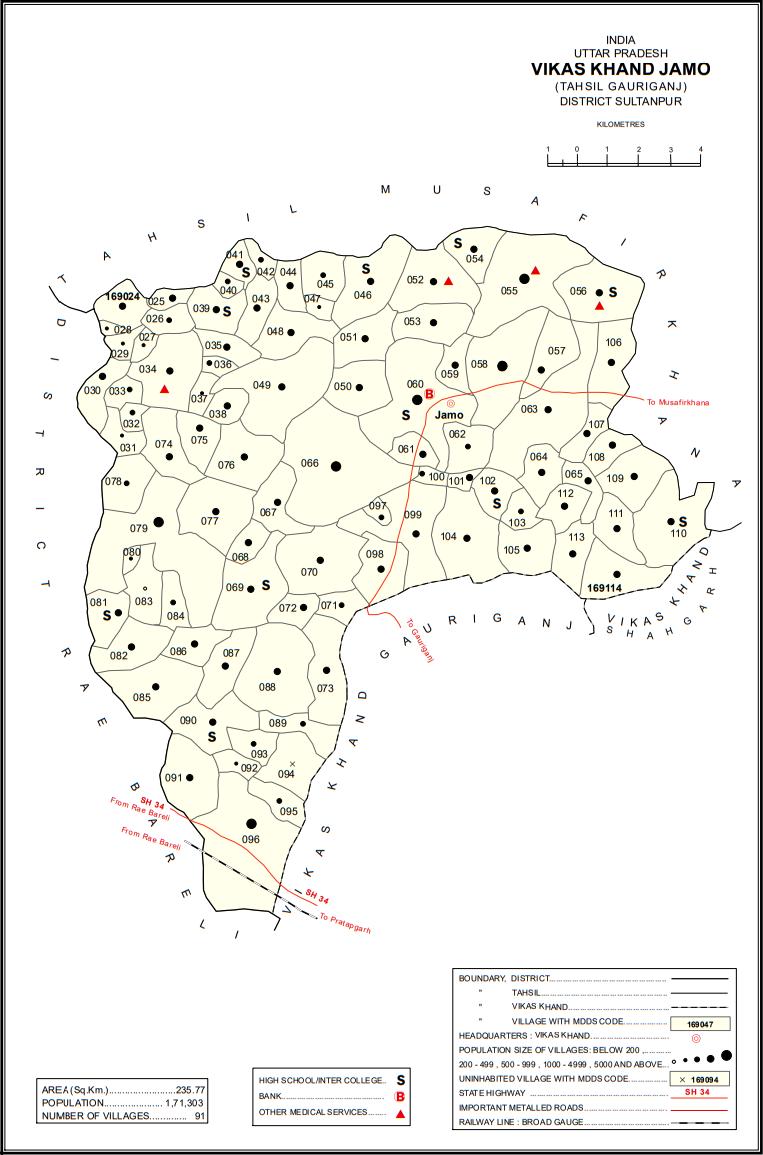
- Map showing Katari (#055) in Jamo CD block

- Location in Uttar Pradesh, India
- Coordinates: 26.403678°N 81.696967°E
- Country: India
- State: Uttar Pradesh
- Division: Ayodhya
- District: Amethi

Area
  - Total: 7.115 km^{2} (2.747 sq mi)

Population (2011)
  - Total: 6,500
  - Density: 910/km^{2} (2,400/sq mi)

Languages
  - Official: Hindi, Urdu
- Time zone: UTC+5:30 (IST)

Katari is a village in Jamo block of Amethi district, Uttar Pradesh, India. It is located by a stream called the Naiya or Kandu nala, which flows east toward the Gomti River. The main highway from Lucknow to Jaunpur passes further north. Katari was historically the seat of a taluqdari estate held by a leading branch of the Kanhpuria Rajputs.

As of 2011, Katari has a population of 6,500 people, in 1,075 households. It has 4 primary schools and a family welfare centre and it does not host a regular market or weekly haat. It belongs to the nyaya panchayat of Gaura.

== History ==
At the turn of the 20th century, Katari was described as a large village in the northeastern corner of the pargana of Gaura Jamun. The road to Jamo was of poor quality at the time and was prone to flooding during the rainy season. The population as of 1901 was 2,402 people, including 218 Muslims and a large proportion of Brahmins. Katari served as the seat of a taluqdari estate held by Raja Partab Bahadur Singh, who held 13 villages at the time and was a leading member of the Kanhpuria Rajputs.

The 1951 census recorded Katari as comprising 18 hamlets, with a total population of 2,438 people (1,258 male and 1,180 female), in 539 households and 533 physical houses. The area of the village was given as 1,815 acres. 146 residents were literate, 126 male and 20 female. The village was listed as belonging to the pargana of Gaura Jamo and the thana of Jagdishpur. The village had a district board-run primary school for girls with 91 students in attendance as of 1 January 1951.

The 1961 census recorded Katari as comprising 19 hamlets, with a total population of 2,703 people (1,357 male and 1,346 female), in 581 households and 580 physical houses. The area of the village was given as 1,815 acres and it had a post office at that point. It was also listed as hosting a haat twice per week, on Thursdays and Sundays, mostly dealing in grain and vegetables and having an average attendance of around 100 people.

The 1981 census recorded Katari as having a population of 3,775 people, in 731 households, and having an area of 734.53 hectares. The main staple foods were listed as wheat and rice.

The 1991 census recorded Katari as having a total population of 4,331 people (2,311 male and 2,020 female), in 778 households and 775 physical houses. The area of the village was listed as 735.00 hectares. Members of the 0-6 age group numbered 855, or 20% of the total; this group was 51% male (439) and 49% female (416). Members of scheduled castes numbered 1,364, or 31.5% of the village's total population, while no members of scheduled tribes were recorded. The literacy rate of the village was 34.5% (919 men and 281 women, counting only people age 7 and up). 1,334 people were classified as main workers (1,136 men and 198 women), while 60 people were classified as marginal workers (1 man and 59 women); the remaining 2,937 residents were non-workers. The breakdown of main workers by employment category was as follows: 850 cultivators (i.e. people who owned or leased their own land); 367 agricultural labourers (i.e. people who worked someone else's land in return for payment); 14 workers in livestock, forestry, fishing, hunting, plantations, orchards, etc.; 0 in mining and quarrying; 39 household industry workers; 7 workers employed in other manufacturing, processing, service, and repair roles; 2 construction workers; 9 employed in trade and commerce; 7 employed in transport, storage, and communications; and 39 in other services.
