= Bakhshgarh =

- Village
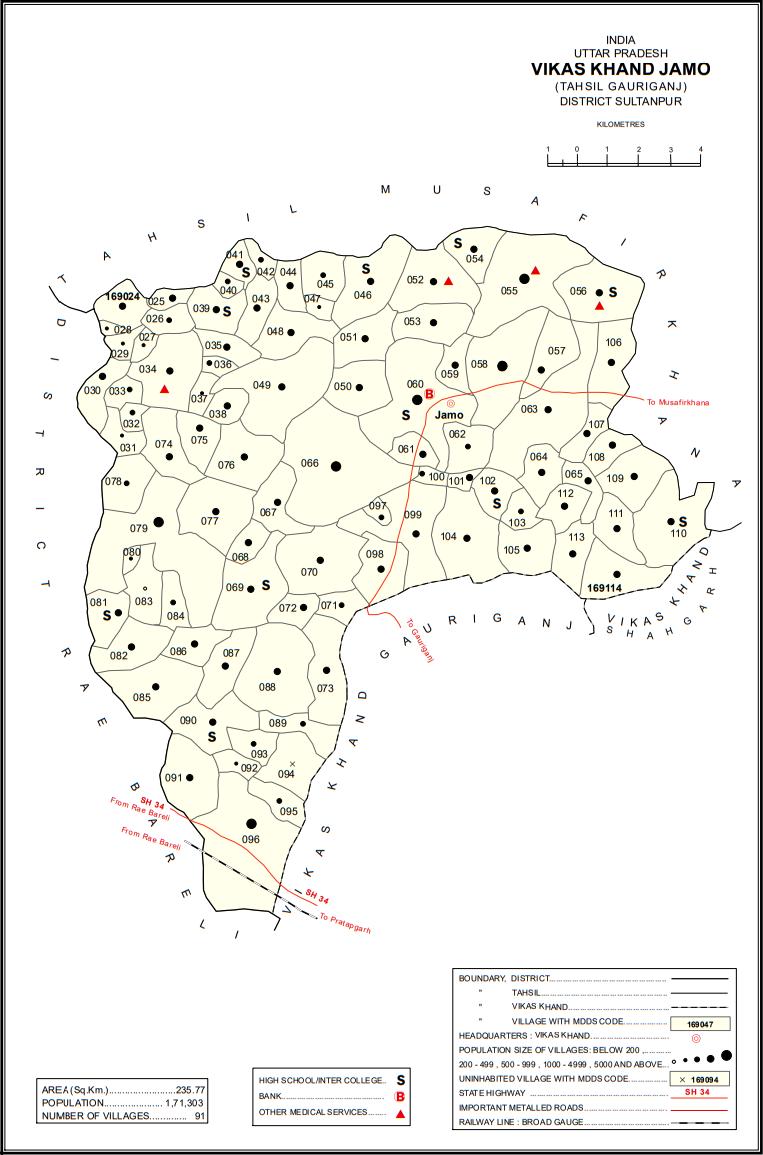
- Map showing Bakhshgarh (#073) in Jamo CD block

- Location in Uttar Pradesh, India
- Coordinates: 26.30422°N 81.634864°E
- Country: India
- State: Uttar Pradesh
- Division: Faizabad division
- District: Amethi

Area
  - Total: 3.611 km^{2} (1.394 sq mi)

Population (2011)
  - Total: 1,628
  - Density: 450.8/km^{2} (1,168/sq mi)

Languages
  - Official: Hindi, Urdu
- Time zone: UTC+5:30 (IST)

Bakhshgarh is a village in Jamo block of Amethi district, Uttar Pradesh, India. As of 2011, it has a population of 1,628 people, in 275 households. It has one primary school and no healthcare facilities and it does not host a weekly haat or a permanent market. It belongs to the nyaya panchayat of Mawai.

The 1951 census recorded Bakhshgarh as comprising 10 hamlets, with a total population of 781 people (397 male and 384 female), in 152 households and 146 physical houses. The area of the village was given as 846 acres. 11 residents were literate, all male. The village was listed as belonging to the pargana of Gaura Jamo and the thana of Gauriganj.

The 1961 census recorded Bakhshgarh (as "Bakshgarh") as comprising 10 hamlets, with a total population of 802 people (424 male and 378 female), in 169 households and 169 physical houses. The area of the village was given as 846 acres.

The 1981 census recorded Bakhshgarh (as "Bakshgarh") as having a population of 1,010 people, in 229 households, and having an area of 342.38 hectares. The main staple foods were listed as wheat and rice.

The 1991 census recorded Bakhshgarh (as "Bakshgarh") as having a total population of 1,116 people (612 male and 504 female), in 254 households and 254 physical houses. The area of the village was listed as 361.00 hectares. Members of the 0-6 age group numbered 197, or 18% of the total; this group was 52% male (103) and 48% female (94). Members of scheduled castes numbered 262, or 23.5% of the village's total population, while no members of scheduled tribes were recorded. The literacy rate of the village was 23% (188 men and 27 women, counting only people age 7 and up). 415 people were classified as main workers (358 men and 57 women), while 32 people were classified as marginal workers (all women); the remaining 669 residents were non-workers. The breakdown of main workers by employment category was as follows: 265 cultivators (i.e. people who owned or leased their own land); 132 agricultural labourers (i.e. people who worked someone else's land in return for payment); 1 worker in livestock, forestry, fishing, hunting, plantations, orchards, etc.; 0 in mining and quarrying; 6 household industry workers; 2 workers employed in other manufacturing, processing, service, and repair roles; 0 construction workers; 1 employed in trade and commerce; 0 employed in transport, storage, and communications; and 8 in other services.
