= Satwa, Tiloi =

Satwa
- Village
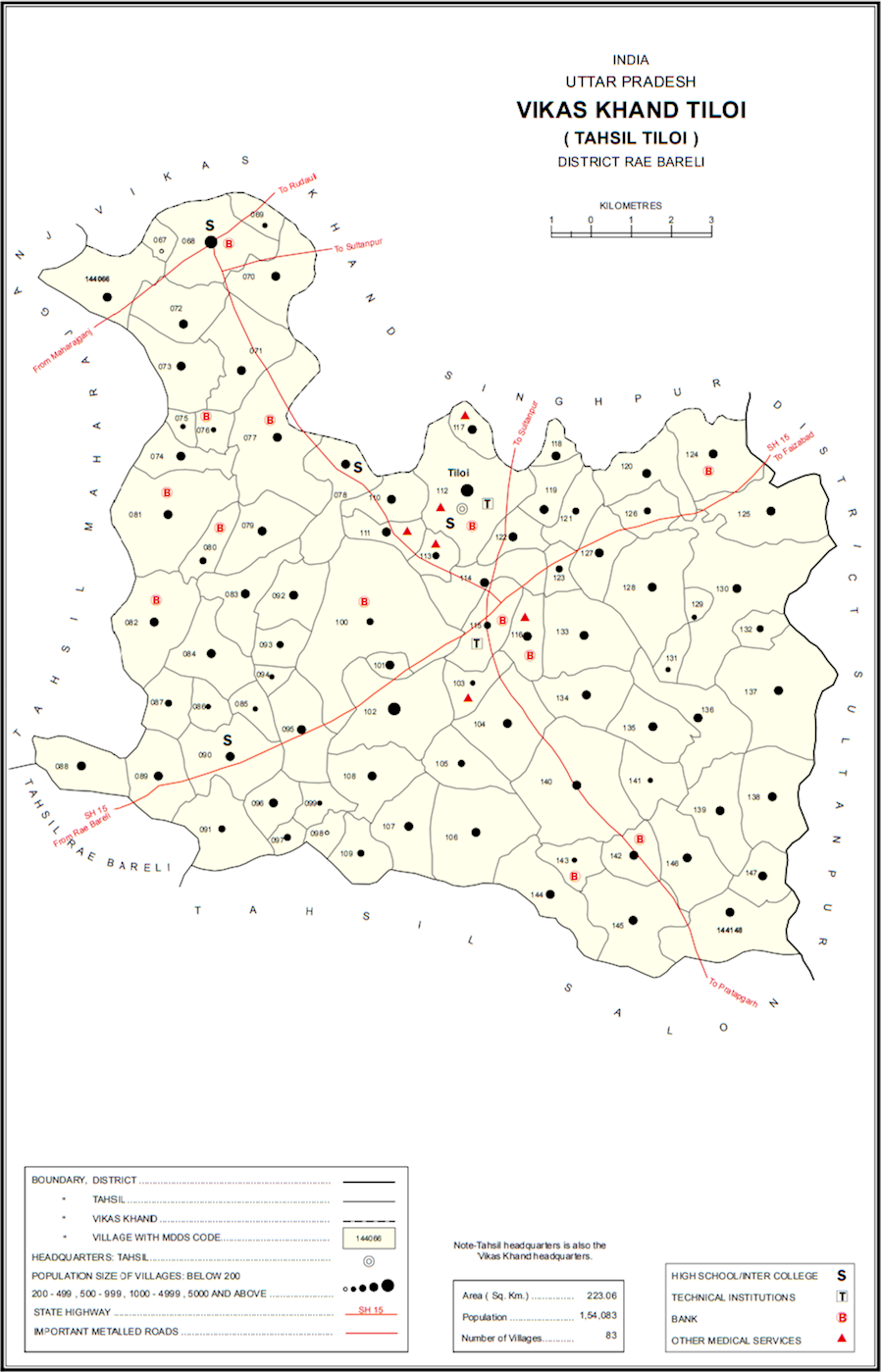
- Map showing Satwa (#100) in Tiloi CD block

- Location in Uttar Pradesh, India
- Coordinates: 26.358274°N 81.454613°E
- Country India: India
- State: Uttar Pradesh
- District: Raebareli

Area
  - Total: 0.936 km^{2} (0.361 sq mi)

Population (2011)
  - Total: 743
  - Density: 794/km^{2} (2,060/sq mi)

Languages
  - Official: Hindi
- Time zone: UTC+5:30 (IST)
- PIN: 229308
- Vehicle registration: UP-35

Satwa is a village in Tiloi block of Rae Bareli district, Uttar Pradesh, India. As of 2011, its population is 743, in 147 households. It has one primary school and no healthcare facilities.

The 1961 census recorded Satwa as comprising 1 hamlet, with a total population of 276 people (135 male and 141 female), in 71 households and 67 physical houses. The area of the village was given as 241 acres and it had a post office at that point.

The 1981 census recorded Satwa (here spelled "Setwa") as having a population of 377 people, in 17 households, and having an area of 97.54 hectares.
