= Ramnagar, Tiloi =

Ramnagar Rāmnagar
- Village
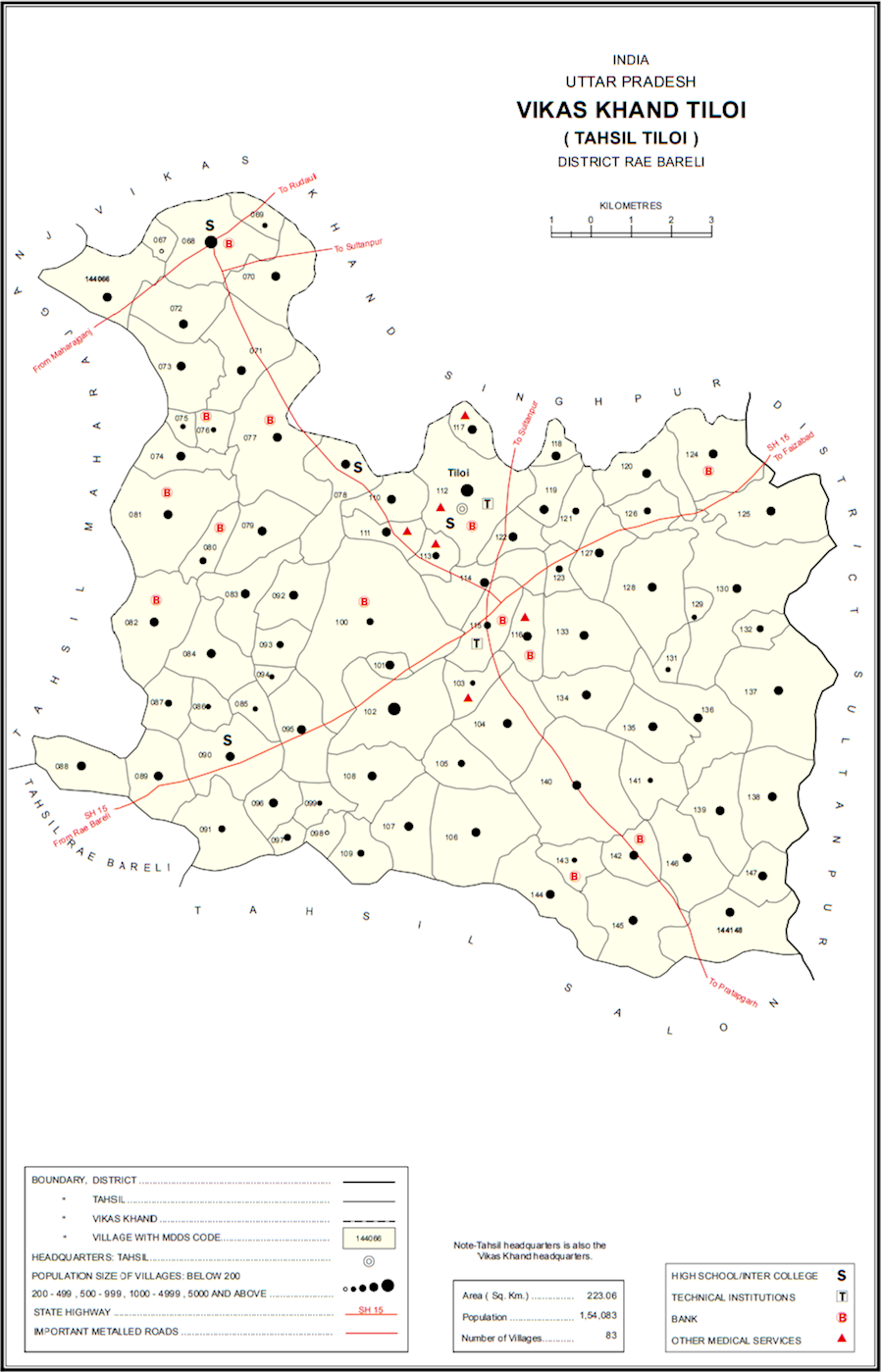
- Map showing Ramnagar (#074) in Tiloi CD block

- Location in Uttar Pradesh, India
- Coordinates: 26.406313°N 81.397868°E
- Country India: India
- State: Uttar Pradesh
- District: Raebareli

Area
  - Total: 1.669 km^{2} (0.644 sq mi)

Population (2011)
  - Total: 1,389
  - Density: 832.2/km^{2} (2,155/sq mi)

Languages
  - Official: Hindi
- Time zone: UTC+5:30 (IST)
- PIN: 229308
- Vehicle registration: UP-35

Ramnagar is a village in Tiloi block of Rae Bareli district, Uttar Pradesh, India. As of 2011, its population is 1,389, in 248 households.

The 1961 census recorded Ramnagar as comprising 3 hamlets, with a total population of 626 people (307 male and 319 female), in 143 households and 133 physical houses. The area of the village was given as 436 acres.

The 1981 census recorded Ramnagar (here spelled "Rannagar") as having a population of 737 people, in 155 households, and having an area of 169.15 hectares.
