= Atheha, India =

Atheha, Uttar Pradesh Atheha, India
- Town
- Location in Uttar Pradesh, India Atheha, Uttar Pradesh (India)
- Coordinates: 26.11798°N 81.61029°E
- Country: India
- State: Uttar Pradesh
- District: Pratapgarh

Government
  - Type: Municipal corporation
  - Body: Nagar Palika

Languages
  - Official: HindiAwadhi
- Time zone: UTC+5:30 (IST)
- Vehicle registration: UP
- Website: up.gov.in

Atheha is a Town in Lalganj tehsil, Pratapgarh district of Indian state Uttar Pradesh.

== Geography ==
Atheha is located at 26.11798°N 81.61029°E.

=== Notable Person ===
- Deenanath Sewak (Ex. M.L.A. and Ex. Minister, Government of Uttar Pradesh)
