= Asni, Tiloi =

Asni
- Village
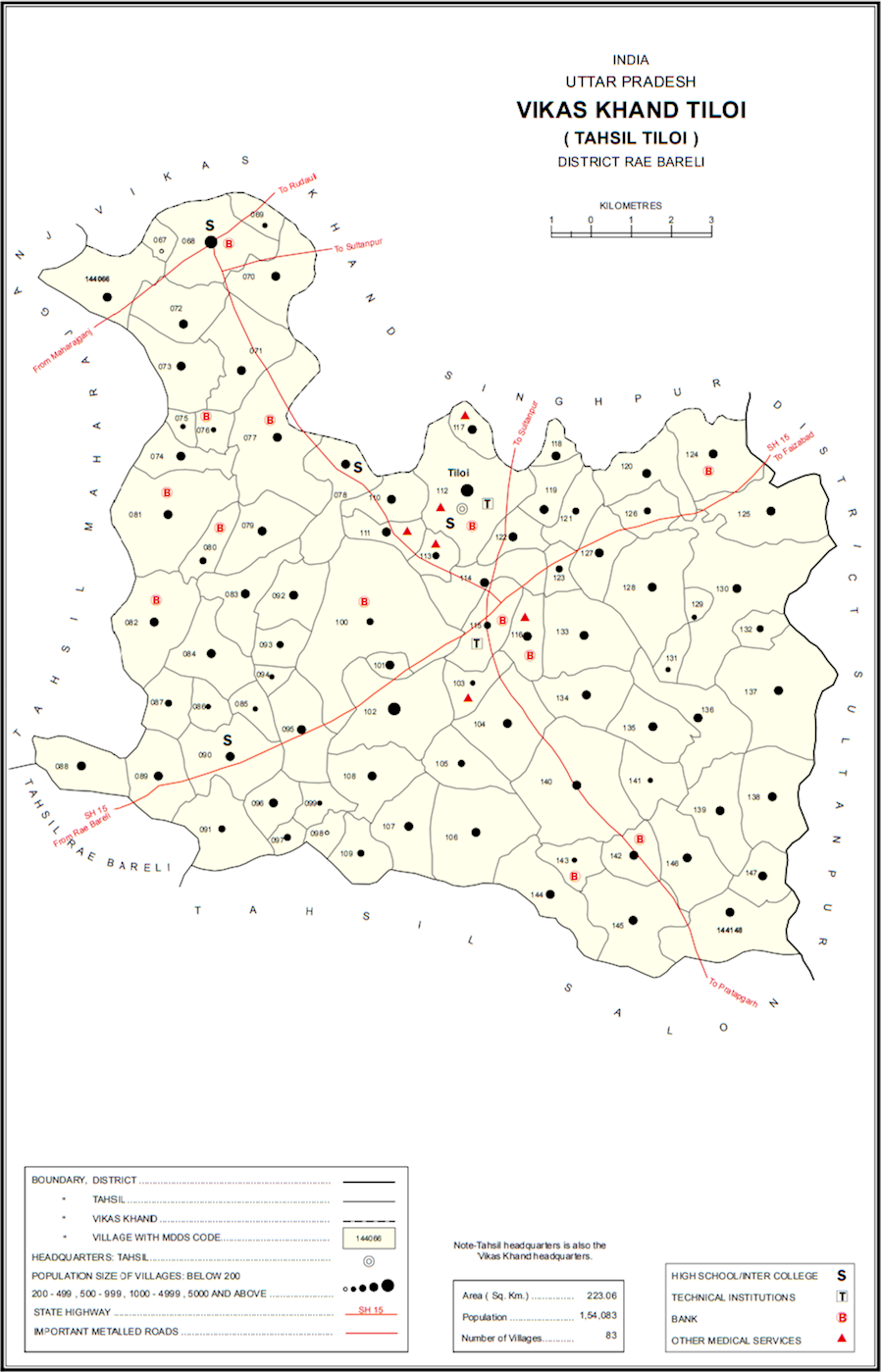
- Map showing Asni (#134) in Tiloi CD block

- Location in Uttar Pradesh, India
- Coordinates: 26.354799°N 81.505662°E
- Country India: India
- State: Uttar Pradesh
- District: Raebareli

Area
  - Total: 2.419 km^{2} (0.934 sq mi)

Population (2011)
  - Total: 2,244
  - Density: 927.7/km^{2} (2,403/sq mi)

Languages
  - Official: Hindi
- Time zone: UTC+5:30 (IST)
- PIN: 229308
- Vehicle registration: UP-35

Asni is a village in Tiloi block of Rae Bareli district, Uttar Pradesh, India. As of 2011, its population is 2,244, in 401 households. It has one primary school and no healthcare facilities.

The 1961 census recorded Asni as comprising 4 hamlets, with a total population of 814 people (404 male and 410 female), in 195 households and 190 physical houses. The area of the village was given as 656 acres.

The 1981 census recorded Asni as having a population of 1,053 people, in 229 households, and having an area of 265.07 hectares.
