= Jamo, Uttar Pradesh =

Jamo Jāmo, Jāmun, Jamon
- Village
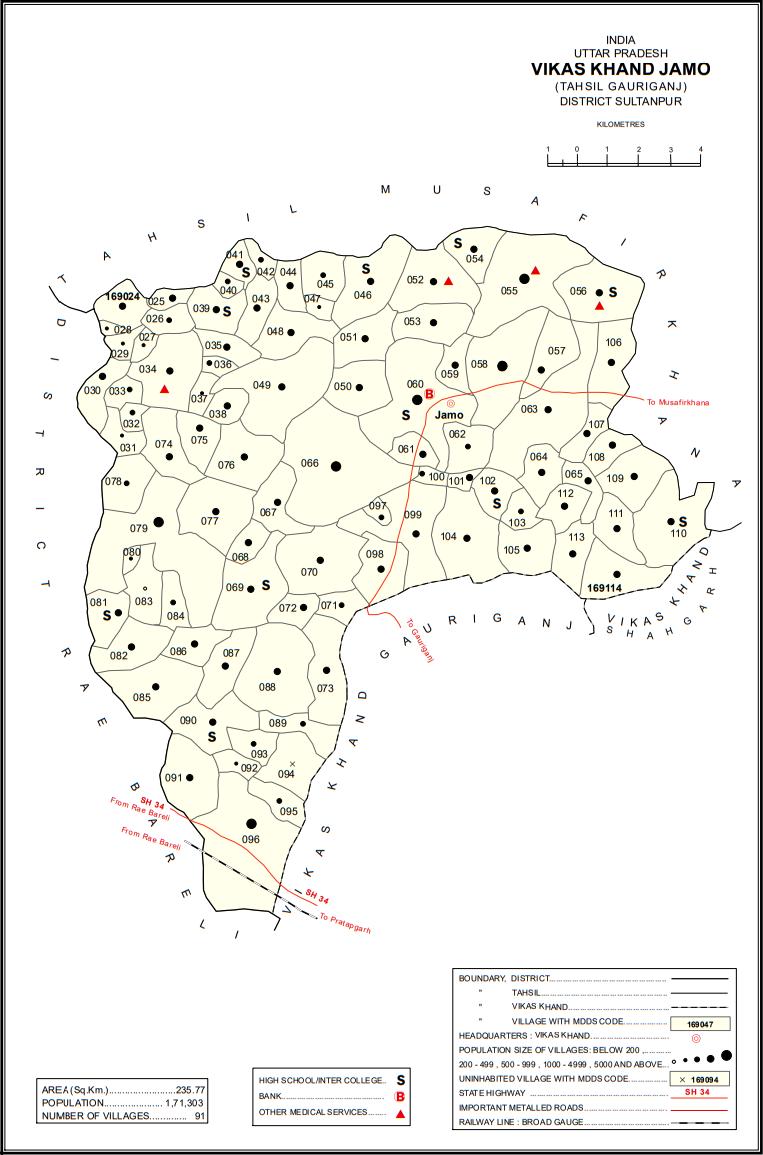
- Map showing Jamo (#060) in Jamo CD block

- Location in Uttar Pradesh, India
- Coordinates: 26.368758°N 81.664°E
- Country: India
- State: Uttar Pradesh
- Division: Ayodhya division
- District: Amethi

Area
  - Total: 6.088 km^{2} (2.351 sq mi)

Population (2011)
  - Total: 6,734
  - Density: 1,106/km^{2} (2,865/sq mi)

Language
  - Official: Hindi
  - Additional official: Urdu
  - Spoken: Awadhi
- Time zone: UTC+5:30 (IST)

Jamo (Jāmo), also spelled Jamun or Jamon, is a village and community development block headquarters in Gauriganj tehsil of Amethi district, Uttar Pradesh, India. As of 2011, it had a population of 6,734 people, in 1,182 households. It was historically the capital of the pargana of Gaura Jamun. It is located at the intersection of four minor district roads, some of which are prone to flooding during the rainy season.

== History ==
Jamo was historically the capital of the pargana called Gaura Jamun. It was also the seat of a taluqdari estate held by a branch of the Kanhpuria. The Jamo branch originated in a partition of lands among the four sons of one Balbhaddar Singh; the other three branches were Katari, Bhawan-Shahpur, and Raisi. The Baraulia taluqa was later formed as a junior branch of the Jamo taluqa.

At the turn of the 20th century, Jamo was described as consisting of a built-up block surrounded by a moat and 21 dependant hamlets. It had an aided school, maintained by the taluqdar and with only a few students. It had a village bank. The population as of 1901 was 1,967 people, and the majority of them were Brahmins, including the leading family of some prosperous moneylenders who owned several large houses in town. The village was described as good for agriculture with many shallow depressions providing plenty of water for irrigation. At that time, the Jamo taluqdar Mahabir Bakhsh Singh held 17 villages, all in the pargana of Gaura Jamun, but he was severely in debt and the estate was in effect mortgaged to a nobleman from Rewah State.

The 1951 census recorded Jamo as comprising 20 hamlets, with a total population of 2,170 people (1,065 male and 1,105 female), in 468 households and 447 physical houses. The area of the village was given as 1,525 acres. 70 residents were literate, all male. The village was listed as belonging to the pargana of Gaura Jamo and the thana of Jagdishpur. The village had a district board-run primary school with 124 students in attendance as of 1 January 1951.

The 1961 census recorded Jamo (as "Jamon") as comprising 20 hamlets, with a total population of 2,075 people (1,041 male and 1,034 female), in 508 households and 454 physical houses. The area of the village was given as 1,525 acres and it had a post office at that point, as well as a government-run dispensary with 2 male and 2 female beds. The Uma Raman Higher Secondary School, established in August 1950, had a staff of 15 teachers (all male) and an attendance of 463 students (all male) that year.

The 1981 census recorded Jamo as having a population of 3,261 people, in 679 households, and having an area of 617.17 hectares. The main staple foods were listed as wheat and rice.

The 1991 census recorded Jamo as having a total population of 3,514 people (1,938 male and 1,576 female), in 731 households and 719 physical houses. The area of the village was listed as 617.00 hectares. Members of the 0-6 age group numbered 579, or 16.5% of the total; this group was 51% male (297) and 49% female (282). Members of scheduled castes numbered 1,062, or 30% of the village's total population, while no members of scheduled tribes were recorded. The literacy rate of the village was 32.5% (755 men and 200 women, counting only people age 7 and up). 1,231 people were classified as main workers (1,098 men and 133 women), while 3 people were classified as marginal workers (all women); the remaining 2,280 residents were non-workers. The breakdown of main workers by employment category was as follows: 612 cultivators (i.e. people who owned or leased their own land); 283 agricultural labourers (i.e. people who worked someone else's land in return for payment); 4 workers in livestock, forestry, fishing, hunting, plantations, orchards, etc.; 0 in mining and quarrying; 61 household industry workers; 41 workers employed in other manufacturing, processing, service, and repair roles; 14 construction workers; 73 employed in trade and commerce; 8 employed in transport, storage, and communications; and 135 in other services.

== Villages ==
Jamo CD block has the following 91 villages:

Village name	Total land area (hectares)	Population (in 2011)
Adilpur	163.8	1,817
Gautampur	45.3	1,126
Majhgawan	102.3	572
Machharia	41.8	401
Lakhnapur	89.4	401
Basantpur	177.8	1,864
Gopalpur	97.6	243
Lalupurdhabiya	80.2	566
Bahadurpur	59.6	562
Dakhinwara	380.4	3,840
Chituhala	151	1,338
Debra	47.9	759
Maharajpur	36.4	296
Rajamau	255.4	2,521
Ahad	211	1,207
Pure Dhanesh Dei	33.1	693
Achal Pur	138.8	1,279
Dulapur	92.4	821
Digha Gopalpur	158.1	1,071
Kamalpur	130	1,204
Parbatpur	193.4	821
Samahai	449.1	4,342
Baghaiyapur	64.1	480
Hargaon	270.3	2,124
Ghatampur	441	4,190
Babupur	243.8	2,513
Gaura	488.7	4,349
Rampurchaudhari	192.2	1,503
Purab Gaura	251.5	2,048
Katari	711.5	6,500
Richhaura	479.2	1,275
Munghi	251.1	2,143
Sukhi Baz Garh	592.6	5,476
Alipur	134.6	1,192
Jamo (block headquarters)	608.8	6,734
Lalupur Dhabiya	126.5	1,453
Dalilpur	165.1	915
Resi	504.6	4,554
Biripur	192.8	1,725
Angrawan	138.8	1,332
Balbhaddarpur	1,023.6	6,140
Shahpur	194.7	1,367
Bhawanigarh	150.4	1,227
Mawai	442.7	3,019
Umaradih	501.5	3,397
Ramgarhi	79.3	663
Bhikhipur	162.3	1,496
Bakhshgarh	361.1	1,628
Janapur	301.9	1,778
Kapasi	240.4	1,945
Ajabgarh	320.8	1,561
Suratgarh	392.8	1,529
Garhilal Shah	228.1	936
Goriya Bad	853.2	5,814
Puredhanesh Giri	25.8	286
Pure Chitai	393.7	1,689
Harkampur	253	1,960
Alpi Misir	19.6	47
Deosi Pur	111.3	711
Orra	404.3	2,046
Heruwa	175	1,274
Duramau	265.5	1,496
Barauliya	611.2	3,878
Jodhanpur	192.8	852
Hardo	358.4	2,395
Bajgarhi	452	2,215
Pure Ausan Singh	67.4	272
Rampur Naurangabad	144.6	741
Talmasiyan	277	0
Lalpur	144.7	572
Aidhi	930.1	7,690
Godipur	38.8	573
Gogamau	252.8	2,148
Bhoe	488	3,396
Ramshahpur	62.1	543
Naupur	93.7	1,249
Lorikpur	200.6	1,353
Dhanepur	116.2	995
Sarme	458.4	3,795
Paras Rampur	245.8	1,694
Barehti	309.4	1,685
Tikra	166.2	1,244
Shahpur Resi	150.2	1,044
Mayas	281.5	2,207
Nadiwan	486.5	2,549
Atrauli	190.1	1,220
Sirkhiri	145.9	1,058
Nimi	195.5	1,382
Ghosiyan	291.9	1,564
Block total	23,577.1	171,303
Village name	Total land area (hectares)	Population (in 2011)
