= Baraulia =

Baraulia Barauliya
- Village
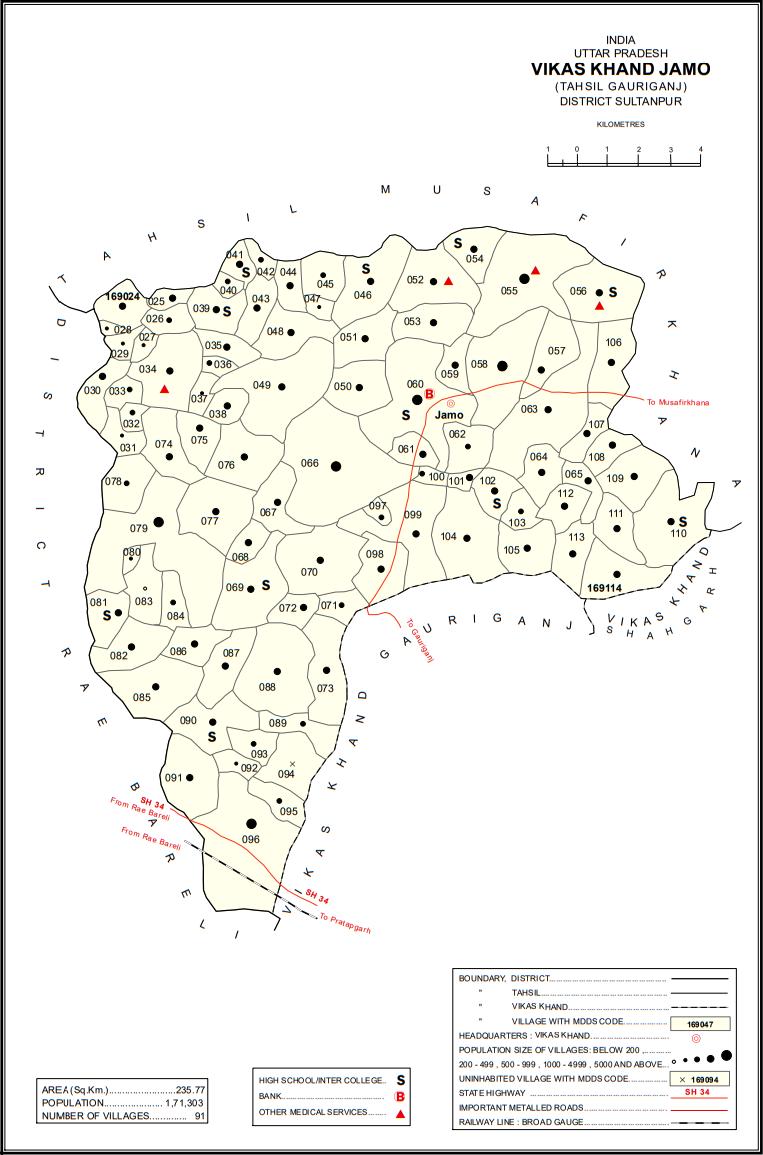
- Map showing Baraulia (#088) in Jamo CD block

- Location in Uttar Pradesh, India
- Coordinates: 26.286675°N 81.613381°E
- Country: India
- State: Uttar Pradesh
- Division: Faizabad division
- District: Amethi

Area
  - Total: 6.112 km^{2} (2.360 sq mi)

Population (2011)
  - Total: 3,878
  - Density: 634.5/km^{2} (1,643/sq mi)

Languages
  - Official: Hindi, Urdu
- Time zone: UTC+5:30 (IST)

Baraulia is a village in Jamo block of Amethi district, Uttar Pradesh, India. As of 2011, it has a population of 3,878 people, in 691 households. It has one primary school and no healthcare facilities and it hosts both a regular market and a weekly haat. It belongs to the nyaya panchayat of Hardo.

== History ==
Baraulia was historically the seat of a taluqdari estate that was established as a cadet branch of the Jamo estate in the sixth generation. At the turn of the 20th century, the Baraulia taluqdar held 13 villages in the pargana of Gaura Jamun, making him one of the primary landowners in the pargana.

The 1951 census recorded Baraulia as comprising 10 hamlets, with a total population of 1,703 people (902 male and 801 female), in 377 households and 349 physical houses. The area of the village was given as 1,481 acres. 45 residents were literate, 42 male and 3 female. The village was listed as belonging to the pargana of Gaura Jamo and the thana of Gauriganj.

The 1961 census recorded Baraulia as comprising 10 hamlets, with a total population of 1,957 people (990 male and 967 female), in 423 households and 391 physical houses. The area of the village was given as 1,481 acres.

The 1981 census recorded Baraulia as having a population of 2,481 people, in 570 households, and having an area of 599.36 hectares. The main staple foods were listed as wheat and rice.

The 1991 census recorded Baraulia (as "Barauliya") as having a total population of 2,622 people (1,390 male and 1,232 female), in 633 households and 625 physical houses. Members of the 0-6 age group numbered 458, or 17% of the total; this group was 54% male (246) and 46% female (212). Members of scheduled castes numbered 852, or 32.5% of the village's total population, while no members of scheduled tribes were recorded. The literacy rate of the village was 20% (382 men and 55 women, counting only people age 7 and up). 917 people were classified as main workers (776 men and 141 women), while 206 people were classified as marginal workers (2 men and 204 women); the remaining 1,499 residents were non-workers. The breakdown of main workers by employment category was as follows: 726 cultivators (i.e. people who owned or leased their own land); 172 agricultural labourers (i.e. people who worked someone else's land in return for payment); 0 workers in livestock, forestry, fishing, hunting, plantations, orchards, etc.; 0 in mining and quarrying; 1 household industry worker; 1 worker employed in other manufacturing, processing, service, and repair roles; 0 construction workers; 1 employed in trade and commerce; 1 employed in transport, storage, and communications; and 15 in other services.
