= Jagdishpur, Sultanpur =

Jagdishpur Jagdīspur
- Town
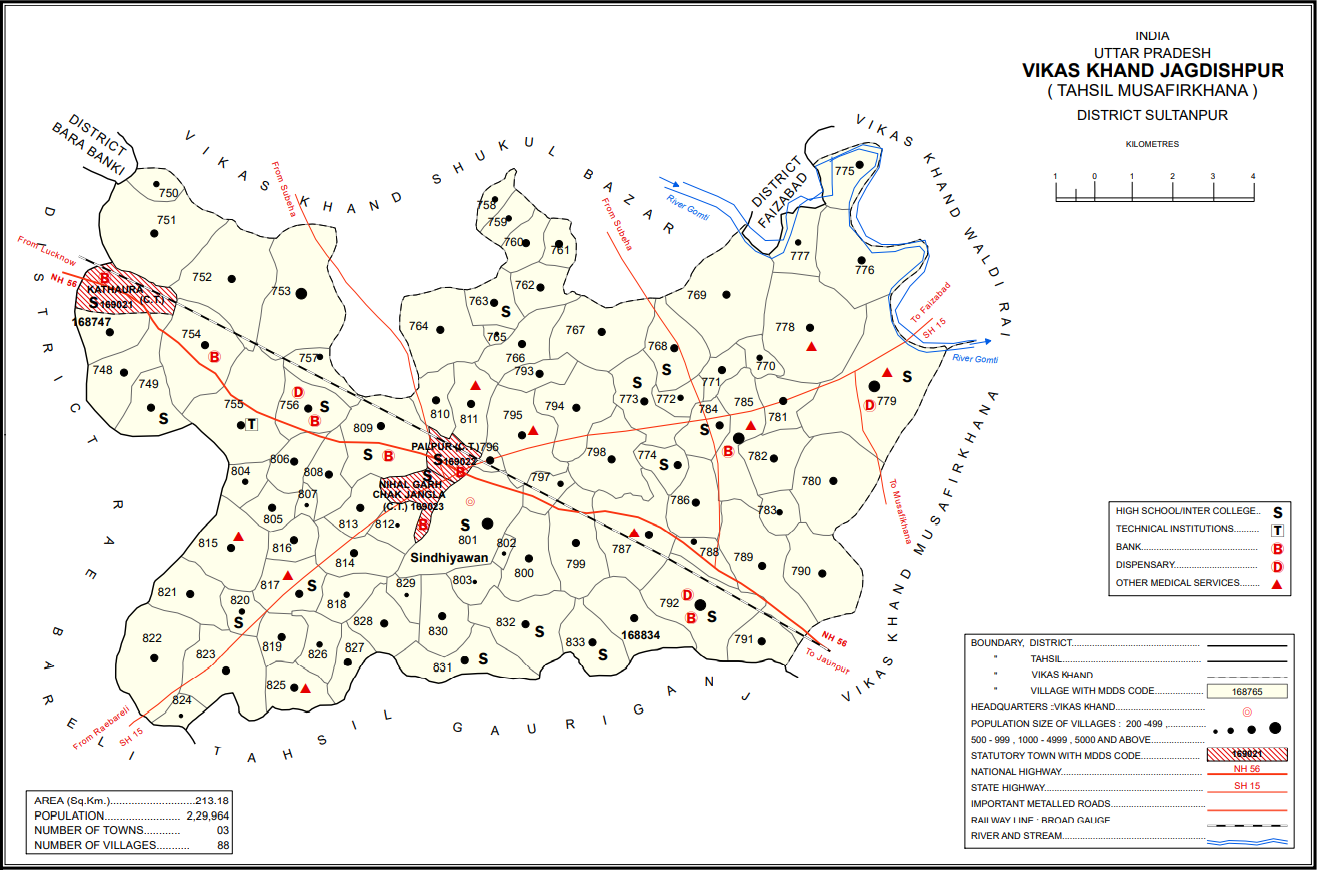
- Map showing Jagdishpur CD block

- Location in Uttar Pradesh, India
- Coordinates: 26.456357°N 81.618961°E
- Country: India
- State: Uttar Pradesh
- Division: Faizabad
- District: Amethi
- Elevation: 70 m (230 ft)

Languages
  - Official: Hindi, Urdu
- Time zone: UTC+5:30 (IST)
- Postal code: 227806
- Website: www.upgov.in

Jagdishpur is a town, community development block, and former pargana in Musafirkhana tehsil of Amethi district, Uttar Pradesh, India. It is also called Nihalgarh, Chak Jangla, or Nihalgarh-Jagdispur. The distinction is that Jagdishpur was the original village, Chak Jangla was an outlying hamlet of Jagdishpur, and Nihalgarh was a fort built in Chak Jangla in the early 1700s and that no longer exists. The town is located at the crossroads between the Lucknow-Jaunpur and Raebareli-Faizabad highways.

== History ==
Jagdishpur was originally named after a Brahmin zamindar named Jagdis who lived at the time when the area was ruled by the Bhars. In 1715, the Bhale Sultan leader Nihal Khan established a fort at the outlying hamlet of Chak Jangla. He named the fort Nihalgarh after himself, and a town sprang up around it that came to eclipse Jagdishpur proper. In 1750, the tehsildar Mirza Latif Beg besieged and captured Nihalgarh; he then made it his residence. Up to that time, there had been two parganas in the area at Kishni and Sathin (or Satanpur), but either Nihal Khan or Mirza Latif Beg united the two parganas into one based at Jagdishpur. Sometime after 1750 but before the 20th century, the fort of Nihalgarh was torn down.

At the turn of the 20th century, the town of Jagdishpur/Nihalgarh had a police station, a middle vernacular school with about 150 students, and a registration office located at the Gulabganj sarai. It also had a small bazar, which mostly dealt in everyday goods like food and clothing, as well as brass vessels made by the Thatheras. There was only one masonry house, which had been built by a wealthy Agarwal Bania named Balmukand who had acquired a small estate by purchase and mortgage. Balmukand's successor, Bibi Rampiari, owned seven villages and two pattis in the area at the time. As of 1901, the population of the town was 2,121 people, including 1,168 Muslims.

The 1951 census recorded Jagdishpur as having a district board-run primary school, with 197 students in attendance as of 1 January of the year.

The 1961 census recorded Jagdishpur as having a police force of 2 sub-inspectors, 1 head constable, and 14 constables. It had a dispensary run by a local body with 12 male beds and 8 female beds, a maternity and child welfare centre, and a post office. Average attendance of the Dussehra festival was about 1,500 people then.

== Villages ==
Jagdishpur CD block has the following 91 villages:

Village name	Total land area (hectares)	Population (in 2011)
Banbhariya	756.9	4,800
Sitauli	358.8	2,338
Dhudehri	326.9	3,087
Rajkheta	108	725
Palia Paschim	477.8	3,541
Koilesh Mubaraqpur	499.3	3,841
Sendurwa	494	5,506
Kamrauli	396.3	4,453
Utelwa	429.2	2,552
Niyawa	209.9	2,760
Sarai Alam	120.9	652
Ankara	70.6	701
Shahpur Allad Husain	107.3	793
Mangrauli	97	1,783
Bagmira	108	1,255
Rasta Mau	274.7	3,943
Lakhanipur	155.4	1,817
Daulatpur Nisura	358.9	3,169
Pure Moti Shukul	30.2	366
Mirapur	199.5	1,058
Gadriya Dih	314.5	4,187
Deokali	269.8	4,602
Mau Atwara	554.6	4,551
Makhdum Pur	117.8	865
Nihal Pur	82.6	1,525
Mohuddinpur	70.8	854
Katehti	237.5	2,658
Ashrafpur	86.1	1,224
Matiyari Kalan	207.6	1,165
Pichhuti	421.4	2,686
Nasirabad	128.5	870
Kachnaaw	530.2	4,989
Thauri	731.4	6,916
Dichauli	503.3	4,346
Alinagar	80.3	1,024
Purab Gaon	224.8	2,680
Jalalpur Mafi	79.6	691
Bhikhanpur	66.7	1,643
Daulatpur Lonhat	407.5	6,910
Moh Mau	390.1	4,412
Husain Ganj Kalan	480.2	4,009
Namadar Pur	46.8	722
Kaima	307.6	2,332
Imli Gaon	373.9	4,386
Bechu Garh	163.6	1,237
Tanda	558.9	5,851
Khairatpur	183.2	2,278
Parwej Pur	126.5	1,039
Mangauli	359.4	2,866
Sohrat Singh	27.5	1,175
Ranka Pur	76.3	835
Mohabbat Pur	353.9	2,341
Misharauli	269.2	2,120
Bagahi	258.1	2,292
Sindhiyawan	466.8	7,418
Arifpur	23.7	296
Loshan Pur	90.8	461
Garha	83.7	874
Malawa	113.3	1,496
Mangraura	128.6	1,585
Sarai Hetan	42.3	447
Dulari Nagar	835.8	2,846
Jalal Pur Tiwari	362.4	3,588
Urwa	135.1	1,047
Nisura	205.9	2,283
Mirapur Nisura	41.6	288
Mubarakpur	102.4	1,658
Maraucha Tetarpur	236.3	1,216
Uttar Gaon	305.1	3,272
Siryari	119.9	1,094
Saresar	176.8	2,971
Mohammad Pur	108.6	701
Kapuripur	102.8	1,235
Purab Gaon	89.7	779
Badhauli	215.6	2,111
Mudupur Umraula	381	2,938
Naudand	328.6	2,948
Rampur Gosai	55.7	473
Babu Pur Sharia	180.4	2,672
Khau Pur	148.4	761
Shesh Pur	98	1,315
Hasawa Sukhn Pur	165.4	1,721
Hasan Pur Jareye	78.5	338
Itraur	204.4	2,105
Dakkhin Gaon Mau	323.1	3,443
Harimau	246.7	4,001
Gunge Mau	195.4	1,893
Gaimau	255.6	1,617
