= Asian Paints =

Indian multinational paint company

- Formerly: Asian Oil and Paint Company Pvt. Ltd. (1945–1965); Asian Paints (India) Pvt. Ltd. (1965–1973)
- Type: Public
- Traded as: BSE: 50082; NSE: ASIANPAINT; BSE SENSEX constituent; NSE NIFTY 50 constituent
- ISIN: INE021A01026
- Industry: Chemicals
- Founded: 1 February 1942; 84 years ago
- Founders: Champaklal Choksey; Chimanlal Choksi; Suryakant Dani; Arvind Vakil
- Headquarters: Mumbai, Maharashtra, India
- Area served: Worldwide
- Key people: Manish Choksi (Vice Chairman); Amit Syngle (CEO)
- Products: Chemicals; Decorative paints; Industrial finishing products; Coatings
- Revenue: ▲₹36,183 crore (US$3.8 billion) (2024)
- Operating income: ▲₹7,215 crore (US$750 million) (2024)
- Net income: ▲₹5,558 crore (US$580 million) (2024)
- Total assets: ▲₹29,924 crore (US$3.1 billion) (2024)
- Total equity: ▲₹19,424 crore (US$2.0 billion) (2024)
- Number of employees: 11,111 permanent & 22,490 contractual (2025)
- Website: asianpaints.com
- Footnotes; Financials as of 31 March 2024.

Asian Paints is an Indian multinational paint company, headquartered in Mumbai, India. The company is engaged in the business of manufacturing, selling and distribution of paints, coatings, products related to home décor, bath fittings and providing related services. Asian Paints is India's largest paints company by market share.

The company has 27 paint manufacturing facilities in 15 countries, servicing consumers in over 60 countries. Asian Paints is also present in the home improvement and décor space in India.

== History ==
The company was started in a garage in Gaiwadi, Girgaon, Mumbai by four Jain friends Champaklal Choksey, Chimanlal Choksi, Suryakant Dani and Arvind Vakil, in February 1942. During World War II and the Quit India Movement of 1942, a temporary ban on paint imports left only foreign companies and Shalimar Paints in the market. Asian Paints took up the market and reported an annual turnover of ₹23 crore in 1952 but with only 2% PBT margin. By 1967, it became the leading paints manufacturer in the country.

Asian Paints established its first overseas subsidiary in 1978 in Fiji, before expanding into Nepal in 1983. The company made its first international acquisition in 1999, when it took over Sri Lanka's second largest paint company, Delmege Forsyth & Co. In 2000, it began operations in Oman through a joint venture with the Al Hassan Group.

In 2002, Asian Paints acquired a 60% stake in Egyptian paint manufacturer SCIB Chemicals for ₹24.5 crore (US$5.04 million).It also acquired a 50.1% stake in the SGX-listed Berger International Singapore, which had operations in 11 countries across Southeast Asia, West Asia, the Caribbean, China and Malta, for US$20.8 million. Later that year, it entered the Bangladesh market by incorporating a joint venture with Confidence Group.

In 2003, it acquired Taubmans Paints, which functioned in Fiji and Samoa; this added to Asian Paints' existing presence in the region under Apco Coatings brand in Fiji, Solomon Islands, Vanuatu and Tonga. In 2004, the company sold its stake in the Malta subsidiary, which was its only venture in Europe. By 2010, it ceased its loss-making operations in Malaysia, Hong Kong, Thailand and China.

In 2013, Asian Paints increased its stake in Berger International Singapore to 96.48%. In 2014, it entered Indonesia through the Singapore subsidiary. In India, the company ventured into home improvement and décor with the acquisitions of modular kitchen manufacturer Sleek International and bathroom fittings company Ess Ess.

In 2015, Asian Paints completed the acquisition of a 51% controlling stake in Ethiopia-based Kadisco Paint for US$18.95 million. In 2017, it acquired 100% of Sri Lanka's Causeway Paints for ₹387 crore (US$59.43 million).

In 2020, Asian Paints started its personalised interior design service called Beautiful Homes, and launched experiential studios across India under the same name.

In 2022, Asian Paints acquired a 49% stake in the Indian decorative lighting company White Teak for ₹180 crore (US$22.9 million), before buying another 11% the following year.

== Corporate structure ==
=== Ownership ===
The families of the four founders (Choksey, Choksi, Dani and Vakil) together held the majority shares of the company. But disputes started over the global rights in 1990s when the company expanded beyond India. Champaklal Choksey died in July 1997 and his son Atul took over. After failed collaboration talks with the British company Imperial Chemical Industries, Choksey family's 13.7% shares were mutually bought by the remaining three families and Unit Trust of India. As of 2008, the Choksi, Dani and Vakil families hold a share of 47.81%. Ashwin Dani, the non-executive director of Asian Paints, died on 28 September 2023 at the age of 79. As per the Forbes list of India's 100 richest tycoons, dated 9 October 2024, Dani family is ranked 36th with a net worth of $8.1 billion.

=== Shareholding pattern ===
As of 12 August 2024

Category of Shareholder	Shareholding
Promoter Group	52.63%
FII	15.27%
DII	12.36%
Public	19.68%
Others	0.06%
Total	100%

== Manufacturing locations ==
The company along with its subsidiaries have 27 manufacturing facilities across 15 countries serving customer globally in over 60 countries.

S.No.	Country	Number of manufacturing plants	Location/operating brand
1	India	10	Ankleshwar & Sarigam (Gujarat), Patancheru (Telangana), Kasna (Uttar Pradesh), Sriperumbudur (Tamil Nadu), Rohtak (Haryana), Khandala & Taloja (Maharashtra), Mysuru (Karnataka), Visakhapatam (Andhra Pradesh)
2	Sri Lanka	2	Asian Paints Causeway
3	Nepal	2	Asian Paints
4	Bangladesh	2	Asian Paints
5	Indonesia	1	Asian Paints
6	Fiji	1	Apco Coatings & Taubmans
7	Samoa	1	Taubmans
8	Vanuatu		Apco Coatings
9	Solomon Islands		Apco Coatings
10	Oman	1	Asian Paints Berger
11	Bahrain	1	Asian Paints Berger
12	UAE	1	Asian Paints Berger
13	Egypt	2	SCIB Paints
14	Ethiopia	3	Kadisco Asian Paints
Total		27	

== Marketing and advertising ==
Logo used until 2012

In 1950s, the company launched a "washable distemper", which was a balance between the cheap dry distemper that peeled easily and the more expensive plastic emulsions. Promoting their brand Tractor Distemper, the company used "Don't lose your temper, use Tractor Distemper" in their advertisings. In 1954, "Gattu" – a mischievous boy with a paint bucket in his hand – was launched as mascot. Created by R. K. Laxman, the mascot found appeal with the middle-classes.

In the 1980s, the festive advertising tagline "Har Ghar Kuch Kehta Hai" (Every home has a story to tell) was introduced. The company revamped its corporate identity in 2000s and axed Gattu as their mascot, and later changed its "Asian Paints" logo to the shorter "AP" mnemonic. Since 2004, Asian Paints has also run ColourNext – an annual colour and material forecast unique to the subcontinent – which announced "Moonlit Silk" as the Colour of the Year for 2026, described as "the colour of slow joy", alongside forecast directions such as IRL, Pastoral, Solar Punk, and Day Dream.
