= Rani Khera, Shivgarh =

Rani Khera Rāni Khera
- Village
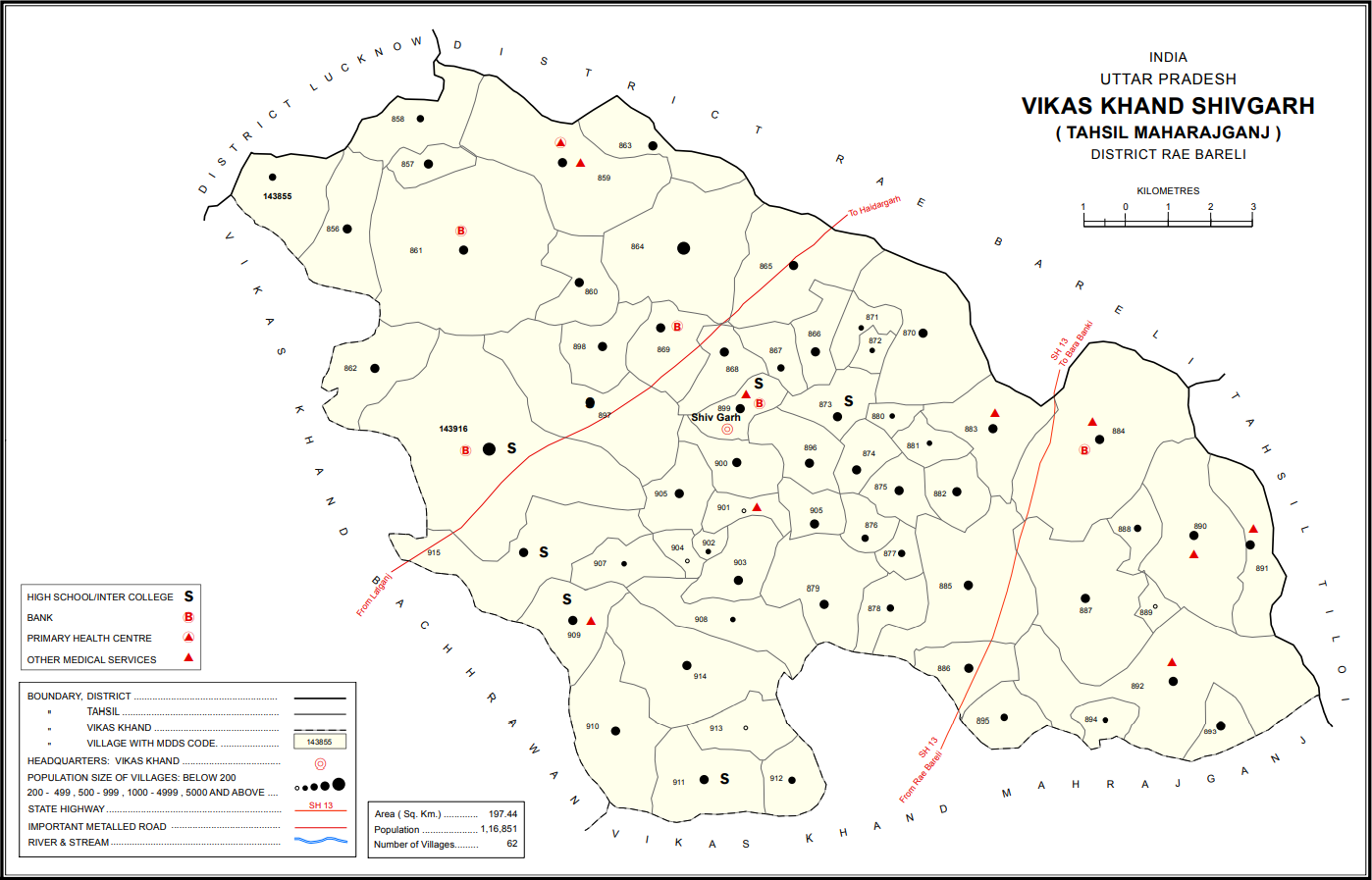
- Map showing Rani Khera (#880) in Shivgarh CD block

- Location in Uttar Pradesh, India
- Coordinates: 26.538293°N 81.282973°E
- Country India: India
- State: Uttar Pradesh
- District: Raebareli

Area
  - Total: 0.58 km^{2} (0.22 sq mi)

Population (2011)
  - Total: 368
  - Density: 630/km^{2} (1,600/sq mi)

Languages
  - Official: Hindi
- Time zone: UTC+5:30 (IST)
- Vehicle registration: UP-35

Rani Khera is a village in Shivgarh block of Rae Bareli district, Uttar Pradesh, India. As of 2011, its population is 368, in 75 households. It has one primary school and no healthcare facilities. It is located 20 km from Maharajganj, the tehsil headquarters. The main staple foods are wheat and rice.

The 1961 census recorded Rani Khera as comprising 1 hamlet, with a total population of 156 people (80 male and 76 female), in 36 households and 31 physical houses. The area of the village was given as 147 acres.

The 1981 census recorded Rani Khera as having a population of 195 people, in 43 households, and having an area of 59.89 hectares.
