= Kumhrawan =

- Village
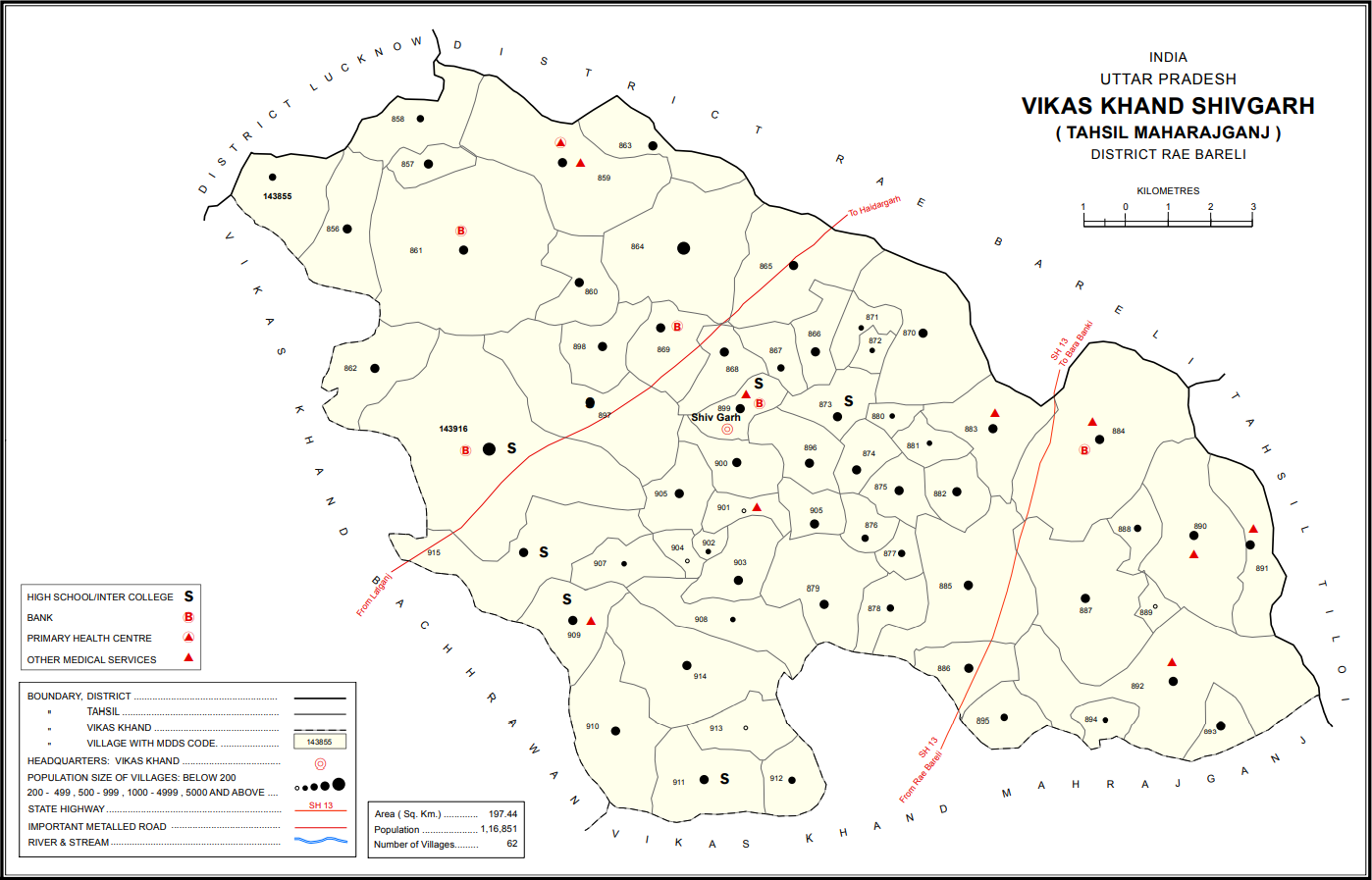
- Map showing Kumhrawan (#873) in Shivgarh CD block

- Location in Uttar Pradesh, India
- Coordinates: 26.540423°N 81.26387°E
- Country India: India
- State: Uttar Pradesh
- District: Raebareli

Area
  - Total: 2.966 km^{2} (1.145 sq mi)

Population (2011)
  - Total: 2,441
  - Density: 823.0/km^{2} (2,132/sq mi)

Languages
  - Official: Hindi
- Time zone: UTC+5:30 (IST)
- Vehicle registration: UP-35

Kumhrawan is a village in Shivgarh block of Rae Bareli district, Uttar Pradesh, India. Formerly a pargana headquarters, it consists of a main village and several scattered hamlets. As of 2011, Kumhrawan has a population of 2,441, in 426 households.

== History ==
Kumhrawan was for a long time the seat of a taluqdar estate held by a branch of the Amethia Rajputs. It originally was in the pargana of Haidergarh, but under the nazim Almas Ali Khan it was split off to form a separate pargana because of conflicts between the Amethia taluqdars of Kumhrawan and Pokhra Ansari. Kumhrawan lost its status as headquarters of the taluqdars when a fort was built at Sheogarh to the west; the old fort at Kumhrawan was then abandoned and by the early 1900s it no longer existed and its location had become farmland. By that point it was described as a minor village with a population of 763 as of the 1901 census.

The 1961 census recorded Kumhrawan as comprising 4 hamlets, with a total population of 984 people (521 male and 463 female), in 198 households and 184 physical houses. The area of the village was given as 743 acres.

The 1981 census recorded Kumhrawan as having a population of 1,271 people, in 238 households, and having an area of 300.68 hectares.
