= Narayanpur, Shivgarh =

Narayanpur Narāyanpur
- Village
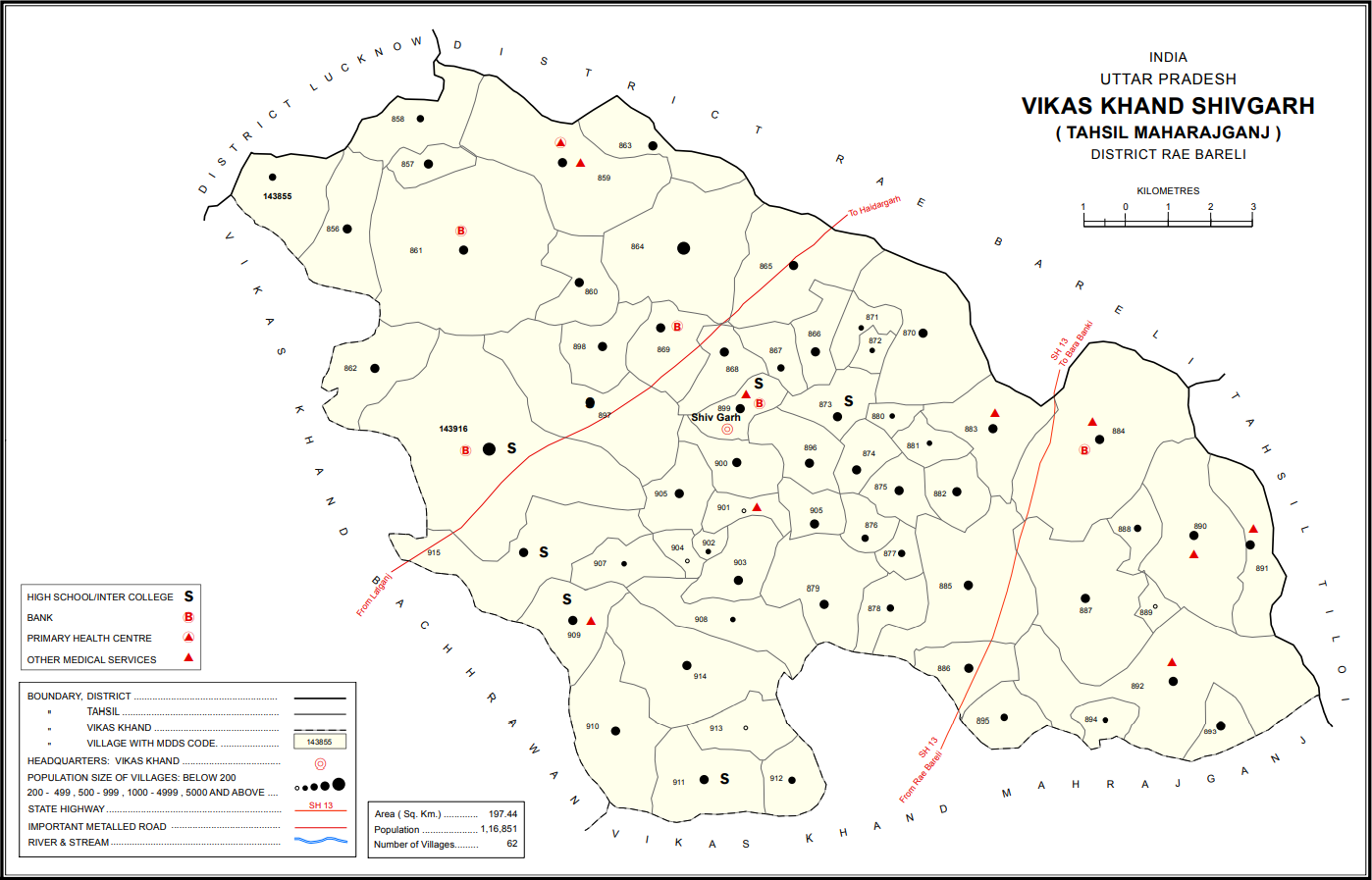
- Map showing Narayanpur (#914) in Shivgarh CD block

- Location in Uttar Pradesh, India
- Coordinates: 26.494863°N 81.227706°E
- Country India: India
- State: Uttar Pradesh
- District: Raebareli

Area
  - Total: 5.083 km^{2} (1.963 sq mi)

Population (2011)
  - Total: 1,634
  - Density: 321.5/km^{2} (832.6/sq mi)

Languages
  - Official: Hindi
- Time zone: UTC+5:30 (IST)
- Vehicle registration: UP-35

Narayanpur is a village in Shivgarh block of Rae Bareli district, Uttar Pradesh, India. As of 2011, its population is 1,634, in 320 households. It has two primary schools and no healthcare facilities. It is located 15 km from Maharajganj, the block headquarters. The main staple foods are wheat and rice.

The 1961 census recorded Narayanpur as comprising 7 hamlets, with a total population of 713 people (381 male and 332 female), in 157 households and 153 physical houses. The area of the village was given as 1,215 acres.

The 1981 census recorded Narayanpur as having a population of 848 people, in 87 households, and having an area of 492.11 hectares.
