= Rajapur, Shivgarh =

Rajapur Rājāpur
- Village
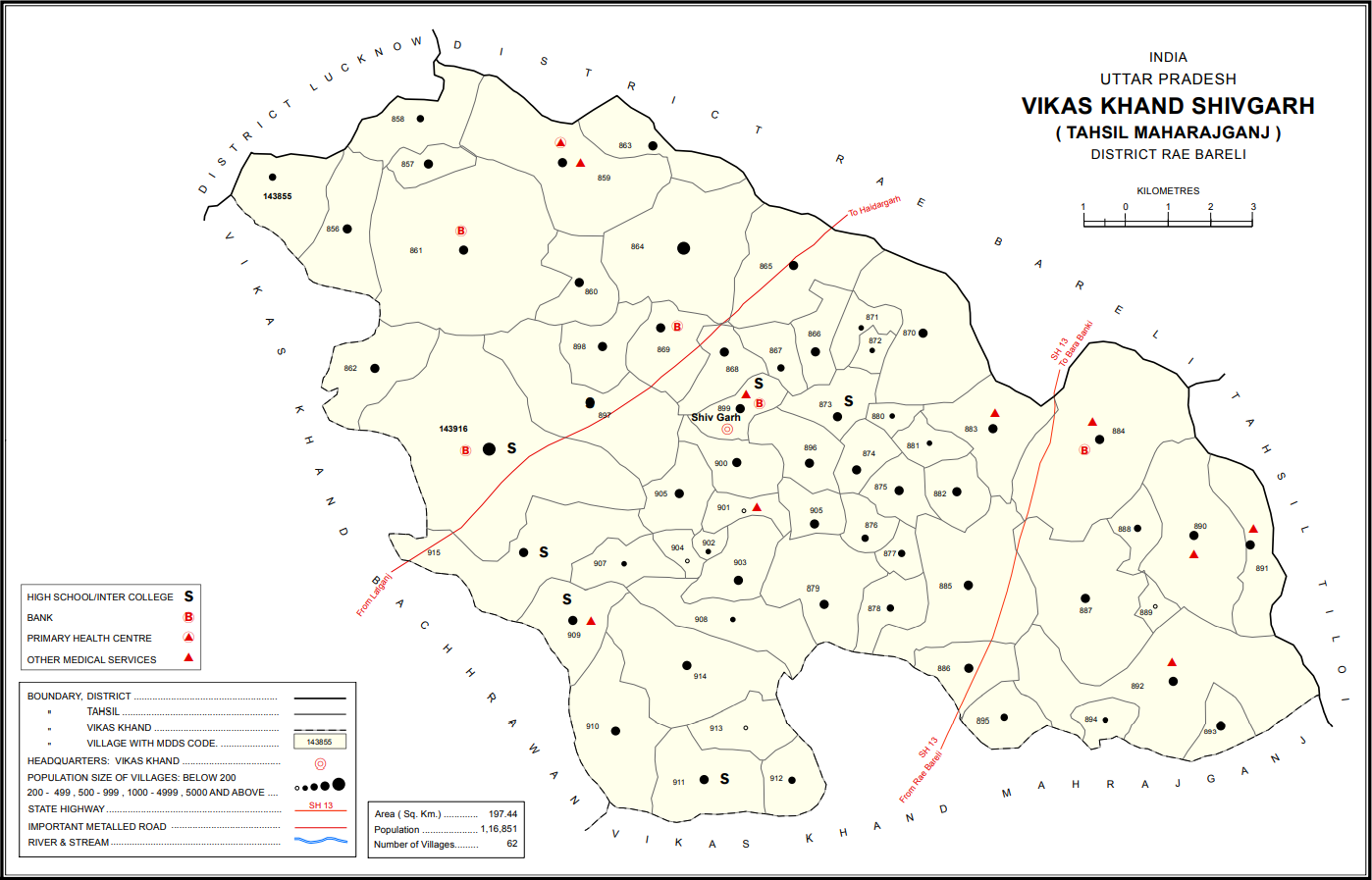
- Map showing Rajapur (#876) in Shivgarh CD block

- Location in Uttar Pradesh, India
- Coordinates: 26.51773°N 81.272049°E
- Country India: India
- State: Uttar Pradesh
- District: Raebareli

Area
  - Total: 0.532 km^{2} (0.205 sq mi)

Population (2011)
  - Total: 767
  - Density: 1,440/km^{2} (3,730/sq mi)

Languages
  - Official: Hindi
- Time zone: UTC+5:30 (IST)
- Vehicle registration: UP-35

Rajapur is a village in the Shivgarh block of Rae Bareli district, Uttar Pradesh, India. As of 2011, its population was 767, in 140 households. It has one primary school and no healthcare facilities. It is located 18 km from Maharajganj, the tehsil headquarters. The main staple foods are wheat and rice.

The 1961 census recorded Rajapur as comprising 4 hamlets, with a total population of 351 people (178 male and 173 female), in 66 households and 63 physical houses. The area of the village was given as 235 acres.

The 1981 census recorded Rajapur as having a population of 496 people, in 80 households, and an area of 95.10 hectares.
