= Pipri, Raebareli =

Pipri
- Village
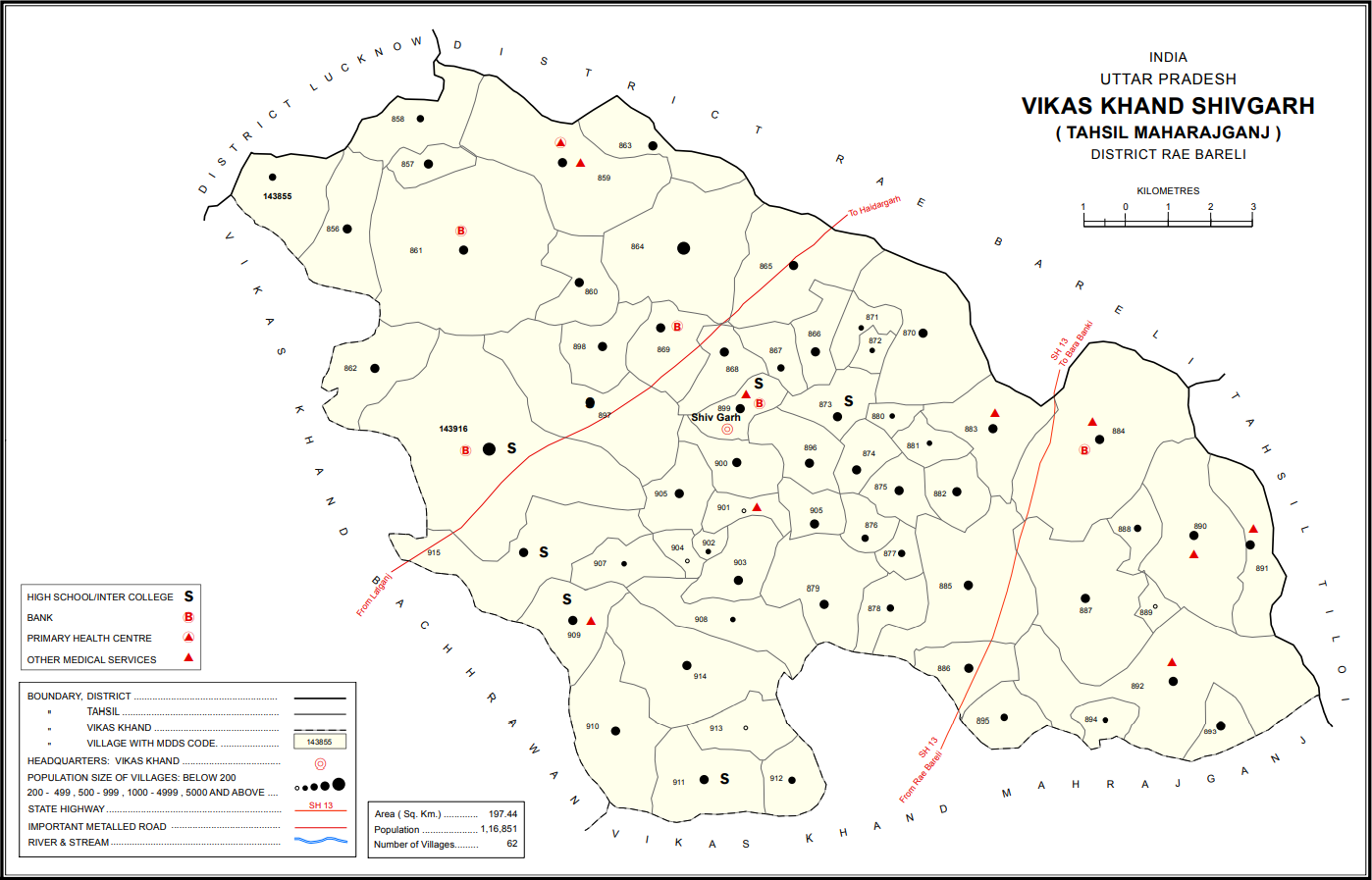
- Map showing Pipri (#868) in Shivgarh CD block

- Location in Uttar Pradesh, India
- Coordinates: 26.553284°N 81.244822°E
- Country India: India
- State: Uttar Pradesh
- District: Raebareli

Area
  - Total: 1.02 km^{2} (0.39 sq mi)

Population (2011)
  - Total: 1,263
  - Density: 1,240/km^{2} (3,210/sq mi)

Languages
  - Official: Hindi
- Time zone: UTC+5:30 (IST)
- Vehicle registration: UP-35

Pipri is a village in Shivgarh block of Rae Bareli district, Uttar Pradesh, India. As of 2011, its population is 1,263, in 222 households. It has one primary school and no healthcare facilities.

The 1961 census recorded Pipri as comprising 3 hamlets, with a total population of 617 people (322 male and 295 female), in 121 households and 113 physical houses. The area of the village was given as 252 acres.

The 1981 census recorded Pipri as having a population of 736 people, in 152 households, and having an area of 101.98 hectares.
