= Sarai Chhatardhari =

Sarai Chhatardhari Sarāi Chhatardhāri
- Village
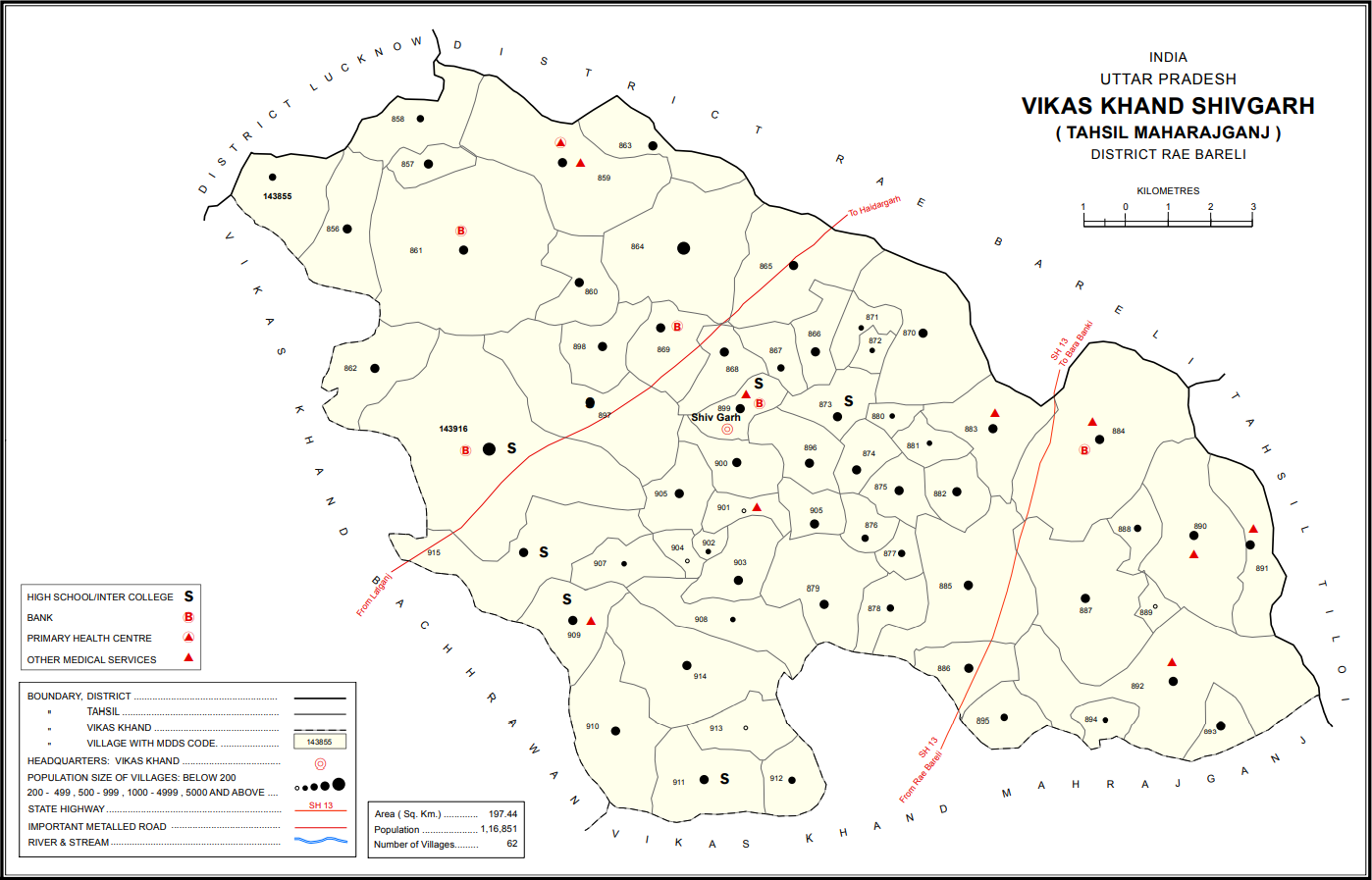
- Map showing Sarai Chhatardhari (#896) in Shivgarh CD block

- Location in Uttar Pradesh, India
- Coordinates: 26.530806°N 81.257996°E
- Country India: India
- State: Uttar Pradesh
- District: Raebareli

Area
  - Total: 2.42 km^{2} (0.93 sq mi)

Population (2011)
  - Total: 1,932
  - Density: 798/km^{2} (2,070/sq mi)

Languages
  - Official: Hindi
- Time zone: UTC+5:30 (IST)
- Vehicle registration: UP-35

Sarai Chhatardhari is a village in Shivgarh block of Rae Bareli district, Uttar Pradesh, India. As of 2011, its population is 1,932, in 351 households. It has one primary school and no healthcare facilities.

The 1961 census recorded Sarai Chhatardhari as comprising 5 hamlets, with a total population of 953 people (480 male and 473 female), in 209 households and 183 physical houses. The area of the village was given as 616 acres.

The 1981 census recorded Sarai Chhatardhari as having a population of 1,145 people, in 230 households, and having an area of 244.83 hectares.
