= Shergarh, Raebareli =

Shergarh
- Village
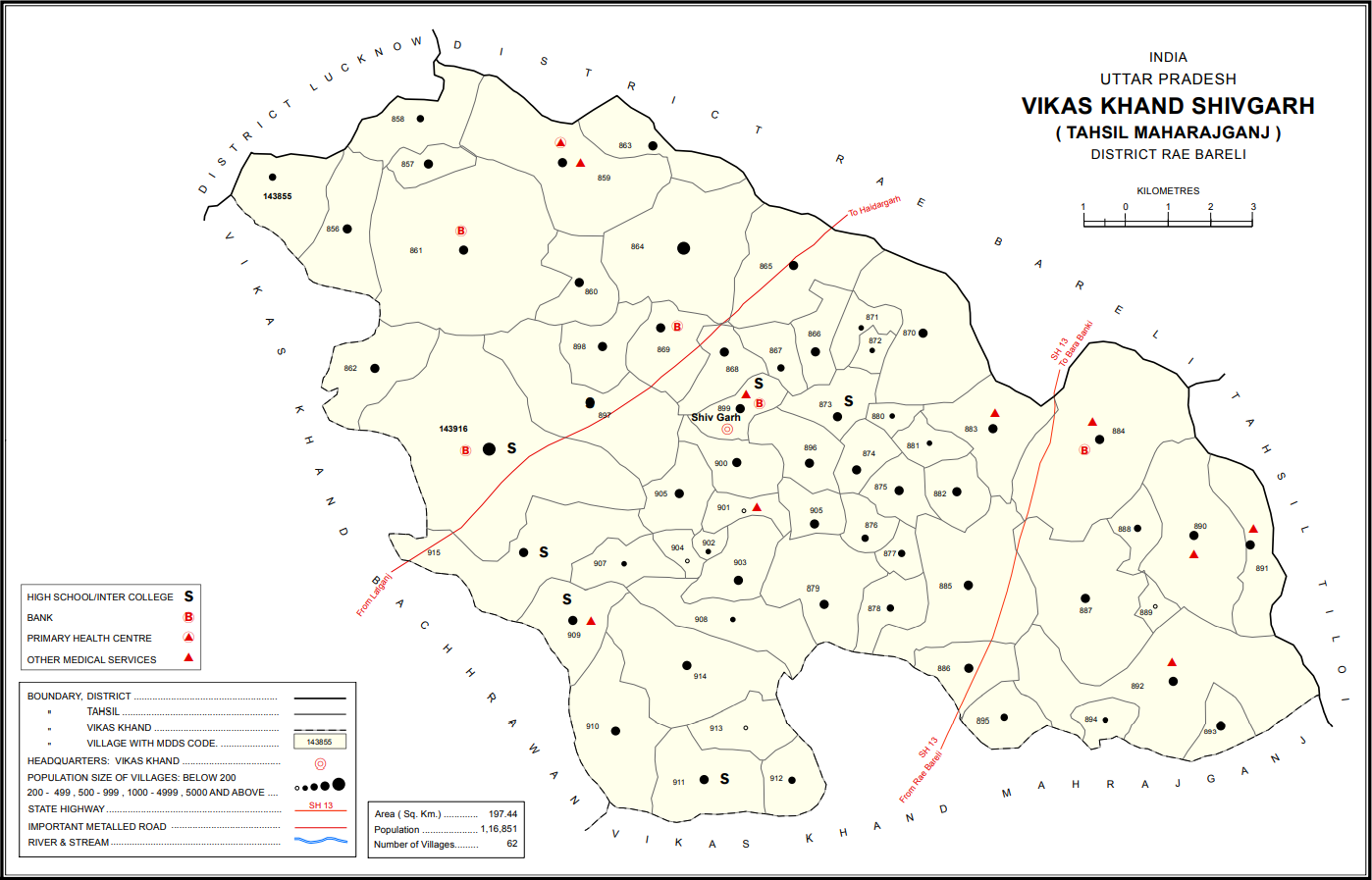
- Map showing Shergarh (#877) in Shivgarh CD block

- Location in Uttar Pradesh, India
- Coordinates: 26.50955°N 81.281958°E
- Country India: India
- State: Uttar Pradesh
- District: Raebareli

Area
  - Total: 0.774 km^{2} (0.299 sq mi)

Population (2011)
  - Total: 548
  - Density: 708/km^{2} (1,830/sq mi)

Languages
  - Official: Hindi
- Time zone: UTC+5:30 (IST)
- Vehicle registration: UP-35

Shergarh is a village in Shivgarh block of Rae Bareli district, Uttar Pradesh, India. As of 2011, its population is 548, in 111 households. It has no schools and no healthcare facilities. It is located 11 km from Maharajganj, the tehsil headquarters. The main staple foods are wheat and rice.

The 1961 census recorded Shergarh as comprising 3 hamlets, with a total population of 294 people (161 male and 133 female), in 58 households and 53 physical houses. The area of the village was given as 203 acres.

The 1981 census recorded Shergarh as having a population of 333 people, in 74 households, and having an area of 82.15 hectares.
