= Masapur =

Masapur Masāpur
- Village
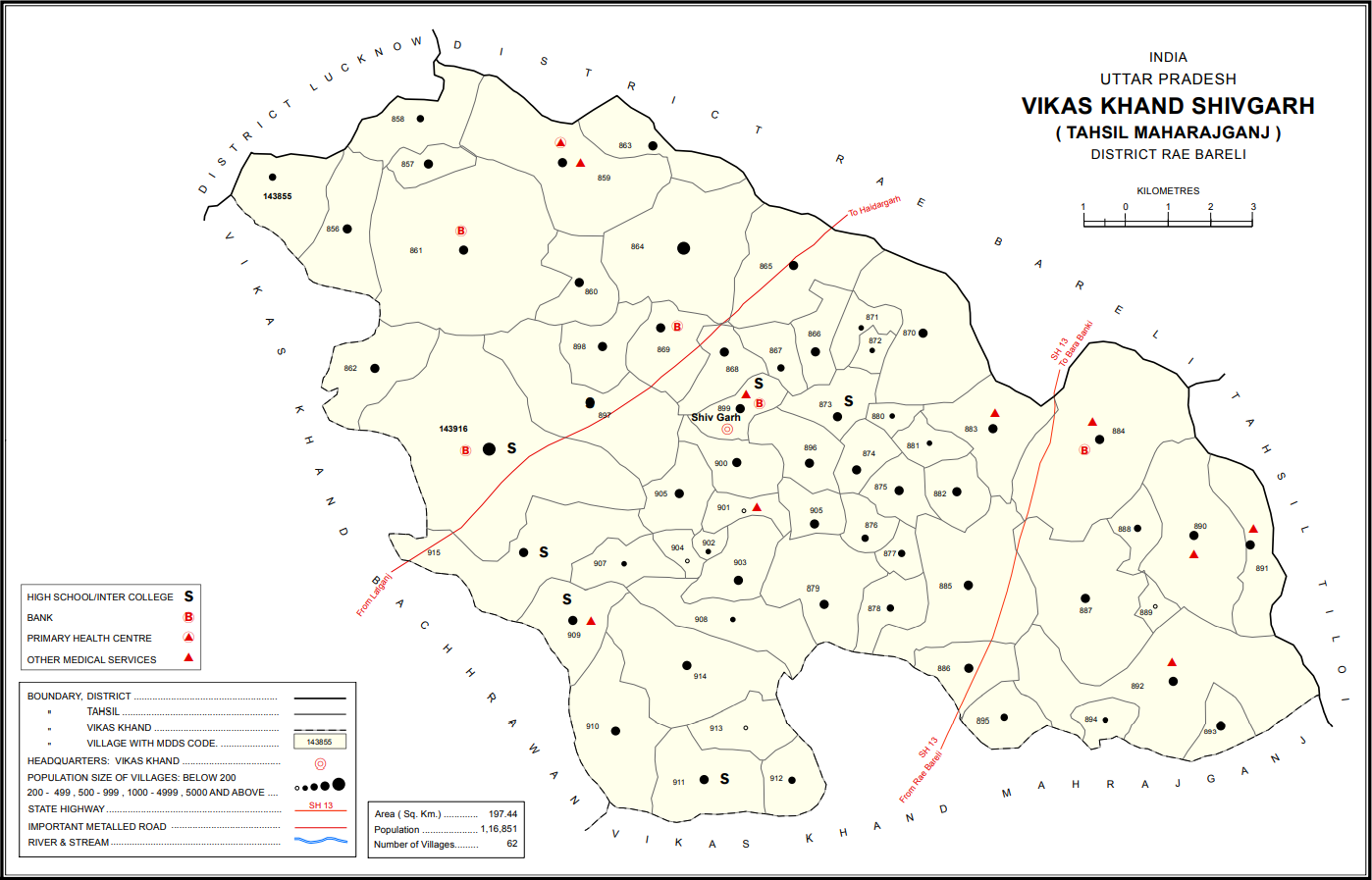
- Map showing Masapur (#872) in Shivgarh CD block

- Location in Uttar Pradesh, India
- Coordinates: 26.551135°N 81.265608°E
- Country India: India
- State: Uttar Pradesh
- District: Raebareli

Area
  - Total: 0.781 km^{2} (0.302 sq mi)

Population (2011)
  - Total: 418
  - Density: 535/km^{2} (1,390/sq mi)

Languages
  - Official: Hindi
- Time zone: UTC+5:30 (IST)
- Vehicle registration: UP-35

Masapur is a village in Shivgarh block of Rae Bareli district, Uttar Pradesh, India. As of 2011, its population is 418, in 76 households. It has one primary school and no healthcare facilities.

The 1961 census recorded Masapur as comprising 2 hamlets, with a total population of 144 people (69 male and 75 female), in 28 households and 26 physical houses. The area of the village was given as 203 acres.

The 1981 census recorded Masapur as having a population of 239 people, in 41 households, and having an area of 82.15 hectares. It had no amenities other than drinking water at the time.
