= Riwan =

Riwan Rīwan
- Village
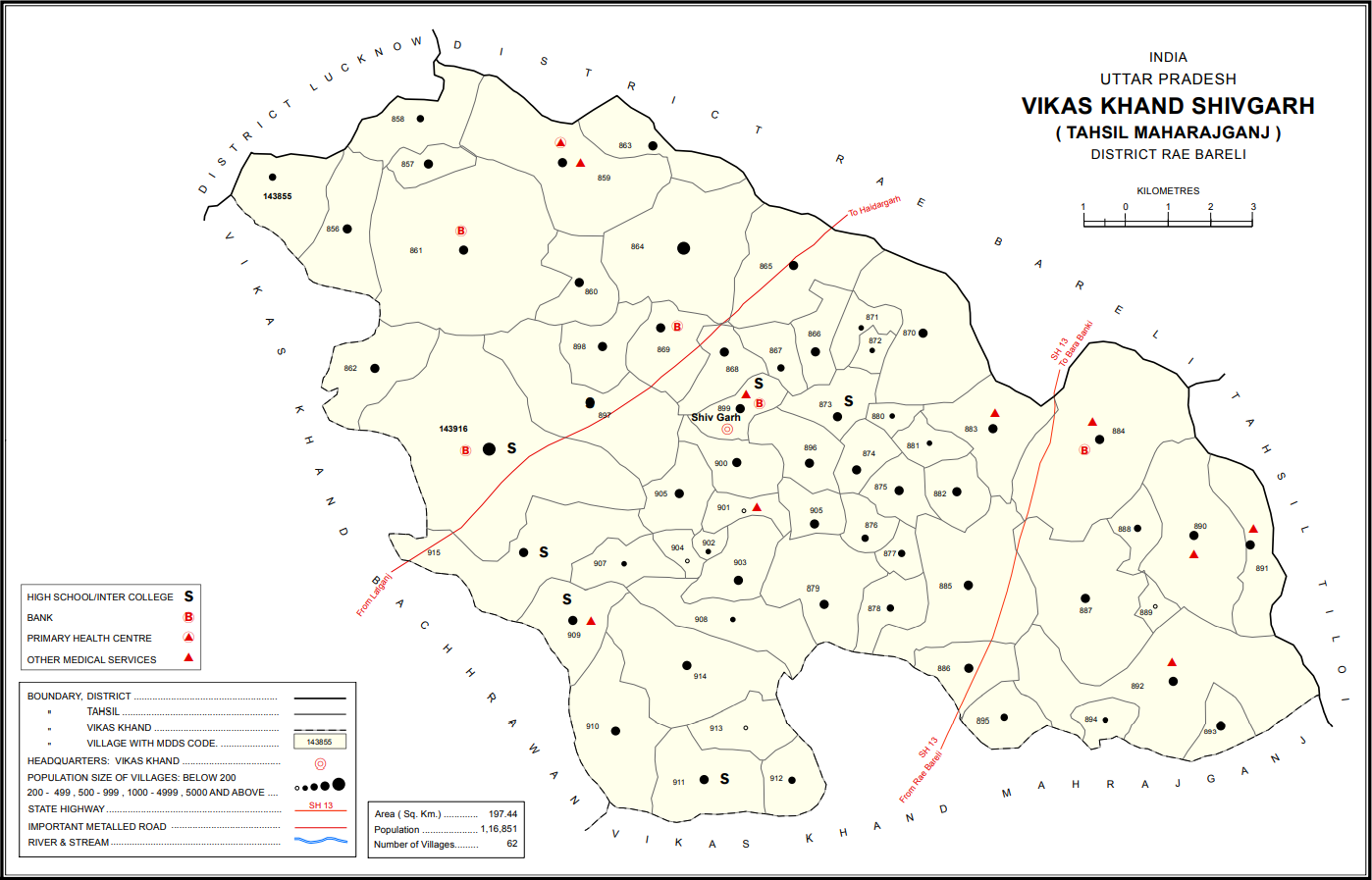
- Map showing Riwan (#885) in Shivgarh CD block

- Location in Uttar Pradesh, India
- Coordinates: 26.503867°N 81.291878°E
- Country India: India
- State: Uttar Pradesh
- District: Raebareli

Area
  - Total: 5.526 km^{2} (2.134 sq mi)

Population (2011)
  - Total: 3,220
  - Density: 583/km^{2} (1,510/sq mi)

Languages
  - Official: Hindi
- Time zone: UTC+5:30 (IST)
- Vehicle registration: UP-35

Riwan is a village in Shivgarh block of Rae Bareli district, Uttar Pradesh, India. As of 2011, its population is 3,220, in 556 households. It has two primary schools and no healthcare facilities.

The 1961 census recorded Riwan as comprising 4 hamlets, with a total population of 1,260 people (672 male and 588 female), in 285 households and 271 physical houses. The area of the village was given as 1,495 acres.

The 1981 census recorded Riwan as having a population of 1,783 people, in 358 households, and having an area of 605.01 hectares.
