= Shivgarh =

- Village
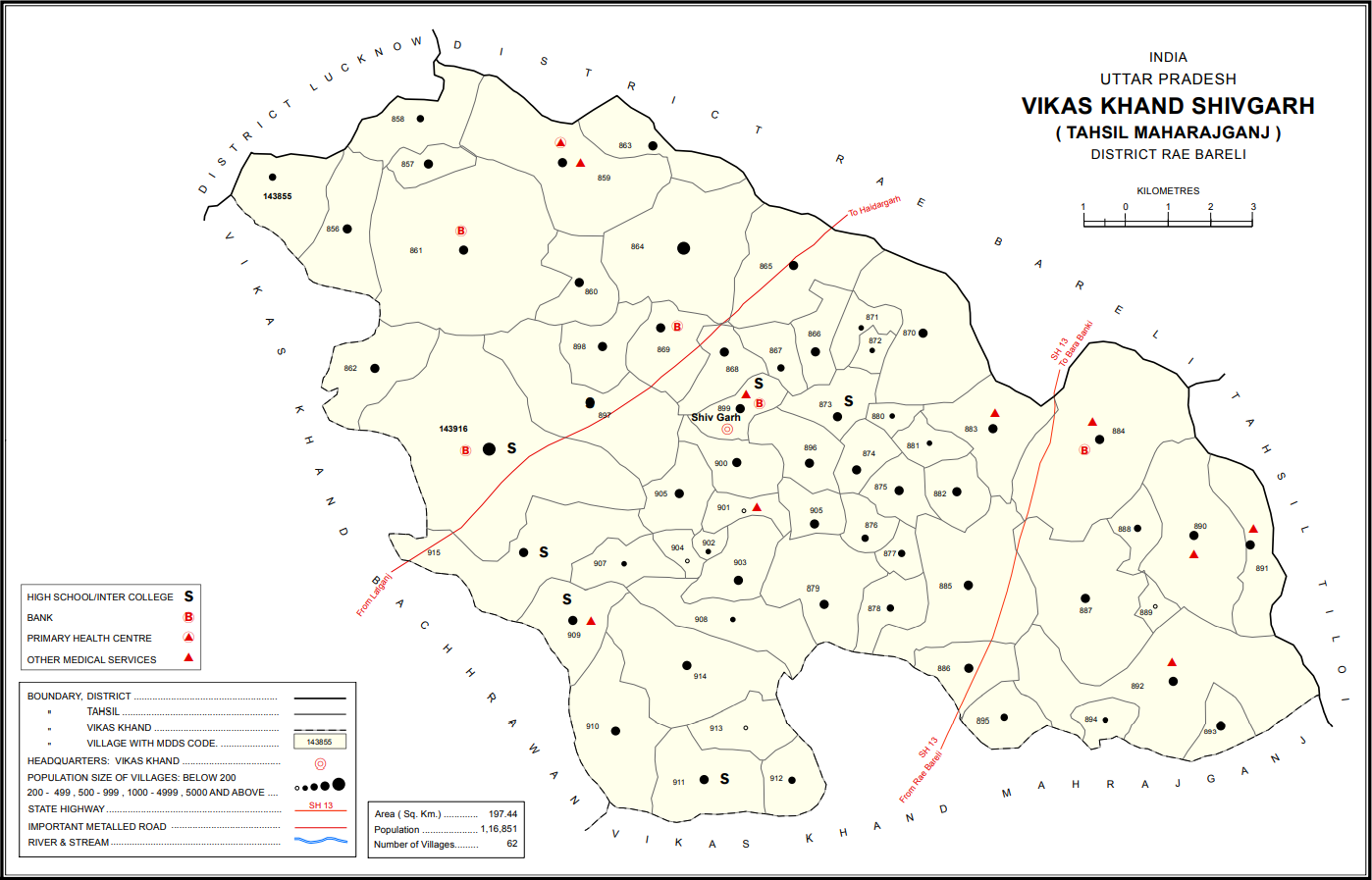
- Map of Shivgarh CD block

- Location in Uttar Pradesh, India
- Coordinates: 26.541677°N 81.250506°E
- Country India: India
- State: Uttar Pradesh
- District: Raebareli

Area
  - Total: 1.56 km^{2} (0.60 sq mi)

Population (2011)
  - Total: 2,812
  - Density: 1,800/km^{2} (4,670/sq mi)

Languages
  - Official: Hindi
- Time zone: UTC+5:30 (IST)
- PIN: 229308
- Vehicle registration: UP-33

Shivgarh is a Nagar Panchayat (Town Panchayat; transl. 'town council') or Notified Area Council (NAC) in Rae Bareli district, Uttar Pradesh, India. As of 2011, its population is 2,812, in 536 households. It has 6 primary schools and 1 healthcare centre. It hosts a Ramlila festival on Agrahayana Sudi 5-11, which involves a dramatic reenactment of the Ramayana. Vendors bring farm tools, earthenware pots, bamboo baskets, toys, and sweets to sell at the festival. Shivgarh also hosts market weekly twice, on Thursdays and Sundays, which mostly deals in grain and kirana.

The 1961 census recorded Shivgarh (here spelled "Sheogarh") as comprising 4 hamlets, with a total population of 952 people (475 male and 429 female), in 212 households and 175 physical houses. The area of the village was given as 395 acres. It had a hospital with 8 beds for males and 6 for females, and it was run by a local body at the time. The Barkhandi Vidyapeeth in Sheogarh, a higher secondary school founded in 1950, had in 1961 a faculty of 23 teachers (all male) and a student body of 451 males and 8 females. Average attendance of the Ramlila festival was recorded as about 3,000 people, while attendance of the twice-weekly market was about 300.

The 1981 census recorded Shivgarh (here also spelled as "Sheogarh") as having a population of 1,588 people, in 351 households, and having an area of 159.86 hectares.

The most busiest route in this town is Shivgarh Main Market route and best English medium School " M.P. Educational Academy" for students to gain knowledge

== Mallu ka purva ==
Shivgarh CD block has the following 62 villages:

Village name	Total land area (hectares)	Population (in 2011)
Mawaiya	288.8	898
Pindauli	355.4	2,094
Bahuda Khurd	123.6	1,852
Bahuda Kalan	250.2	988
Deheli	710.2	4,109
Chitwaniya	329.1	2,314
Bedaru	1,128.2	4,924
Banka Garh	375.1	1,576
Surajpur, Raebareli	295.8	2,018
Baiti	595.8	5,456
Kumbhi	446	3,547
Dhekwa	194	1,594
Rampur Muligarha	118	777
Pipri	102	1,263
Sivli	271	3,366
Dahigawan	544.1	4,230
Math Goshaee	29.1	471
Masapur	78.1	418
Kumharawan	296.6	2,441
Badaver	186	1,037
Kasna	135.2	1,191
Rajapur	53.2	767
Shergarh	77.4	548
Padariya	173.3	869
Jaraw Ganj	303.1	2,100
Rani Khera	58	368
Jugrajpur	77.2	375
Aimapur	195	1,296
Gumawan	388.2	2,482
Nerthuwa	897	4,340
Riwan	552.6	3,220
Variyarpur	230.4	1,217
Basantpur Sakatpur	786	2,831
Shahpur	112	966
Katkouli	36.2	130
Achhai	591.2	2,652
Raipur	294	1,981
Siwan	926	3,437
Rajapur Mustsil Siwan	123	1,059
Jamunipur	103	402
Kamalpur Awadih	153.3	680
Sarain Chhatradhari	242	1,932
Bhawani Garh	633.2	3,770
Dhodhawapur	240.2	2,069
Shiv Garh (block headquarters)	156	2,812
Rampur Khas	163	1,386
Bansinghpur	43	72
Natai	34	345
Kotwa	307.2	1,613
Niyat Kunwar Khera	33	165
Raipur Neruwa	280.2	1,197
Jagdishpur	415	1,953
Basant Kunwar Khera	41	290
Rampur Padumnath	143	351
Bhausi	359.3	2,594
Govindpur	435.7	1,884
Osah	522	3,341
Rampur Tikara	137	973
Bhawaniyapur	57	134
Narayanpur	508.3	1,634
Khajuron	633.5	3,620
Gurha	1,377.9	6,432
