= Siwan, Raebareli =

Siwan
- Village
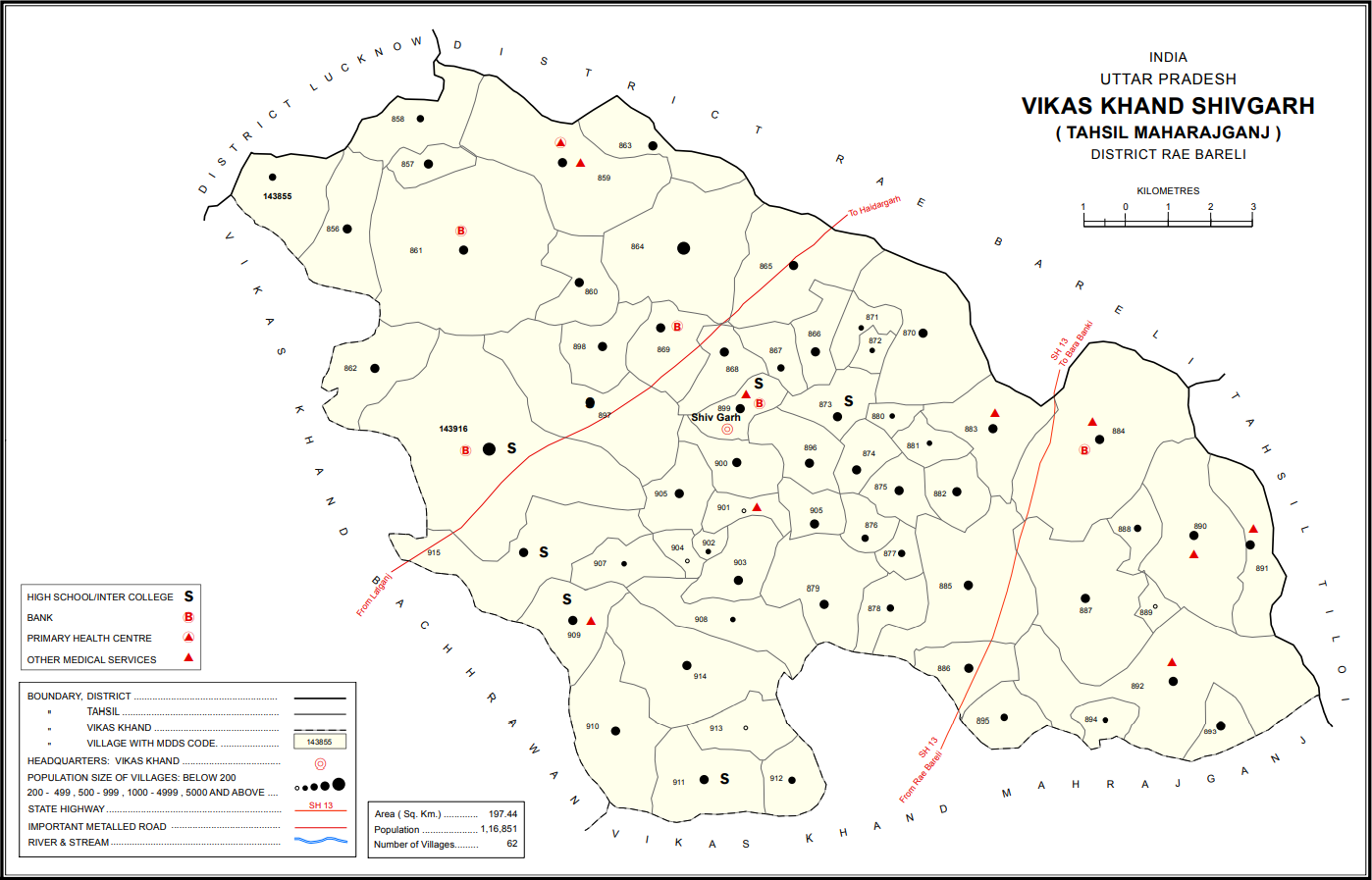
- Map showing Siwan (#892) in Shivgarh CD block

- Location in Uttar Pradesh, India
- Coordinates: 26.484406°N 81.341447°E
- Country India: India
- State: Uttar Pradesh
- District: Raebareli

Area
  - Total: 9.26 km^{2} (3.58 sq mi)

Population (2011)
  - Total: 3,437
  - Density: 371/km^{2} (961/sq mi)

Languages
  - Official: Hindi
- Time zone: UTC+5:30 (IST)
- Vehicle registration: UP-35

Siwan is a village in Shivgarh block of Rae Bareli district, Uttar Pradesh, India. As of 2011, its population is 3,437, in 665 households. It has one primary school and one small clinic.

The 1961 census recorded Siwan as comprising 15 hamlets, with a total population of 1,544 people (818 male and 726 female), in 291 households and 277 physical houses. The area of the village was given as 2,296 acres.

The 1981 census recorded Siwan as having a population of 2,027 people, in 412 households, and having an area of 926.33 hectares.
