= Bhausi =

- Village
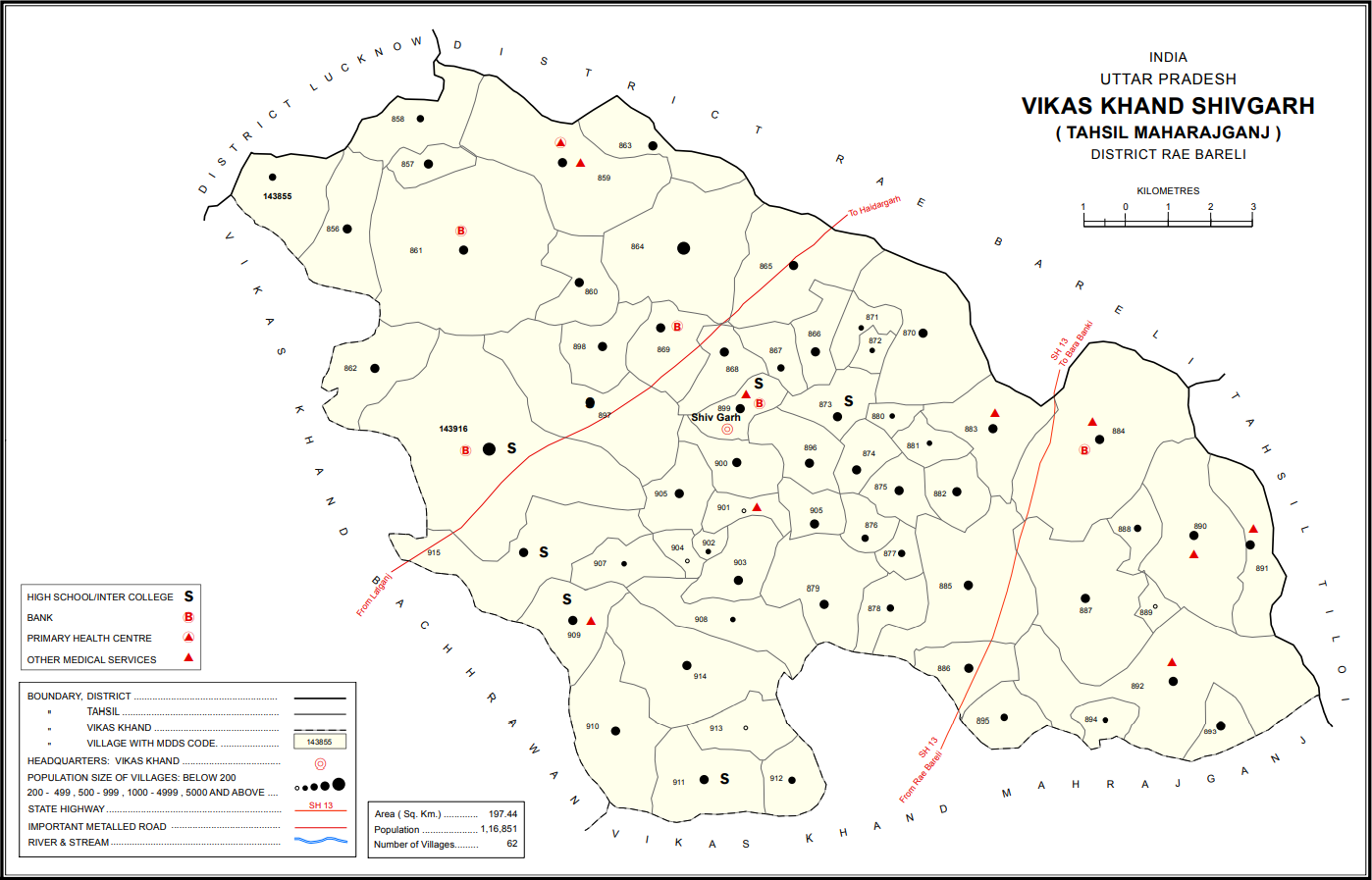
- Map showing Bhausi (#909) in Shivgarh CD block

- Location in Uttar Pradesh, India
- Coordinates: 26.505001°N 81.215057°E
- Country India: India
- State: Uttar Pradesh
- District: Raebareli

Area
  - Total: 3.593 km^{2} (1.387 sq mi)

Population (2011)
  - Total: 2,594
  - Density: 722.0/km^{2} (1,870/sq mi)

Languages
  - Official: Hindi
- Time zone: UTC+5:30 (IST)
- Vehicle registration: UP-35

Bhausi is a village in Shivgarh block of Rae Bareli district, Uttar Pradesh, India. As of 2011, its population is 2,594 people, in 502 households. It has two primary schools and one small medical clinic. Bhausi hosts a Ramlila festival annually on Agrahayana Sudi 15 at the premises of the Temple of BhawshyareVeer Baba, the Grāmadevatā, lit. 'village deity', which involves a dramatic reenactment of the Ramayana. Vendors bring sweets, toys, and everyday items to sell at the festival.

The 1961 census recorded Bhausi as comprising 7 hamlets, with a total population of 1,161 people (608 male and 553 female), in 240 households and 222 physical houses. The area of the village was given as 916 acres. Average attendance of the Ramlila festival was recorded as being about 600 people at the time.

The 1981 census recorded Bhausi as having a population of 1,610 people, in 302 households, and having an area of 370.29 hectares.
