= Achhai =

LDA Colony
- Village
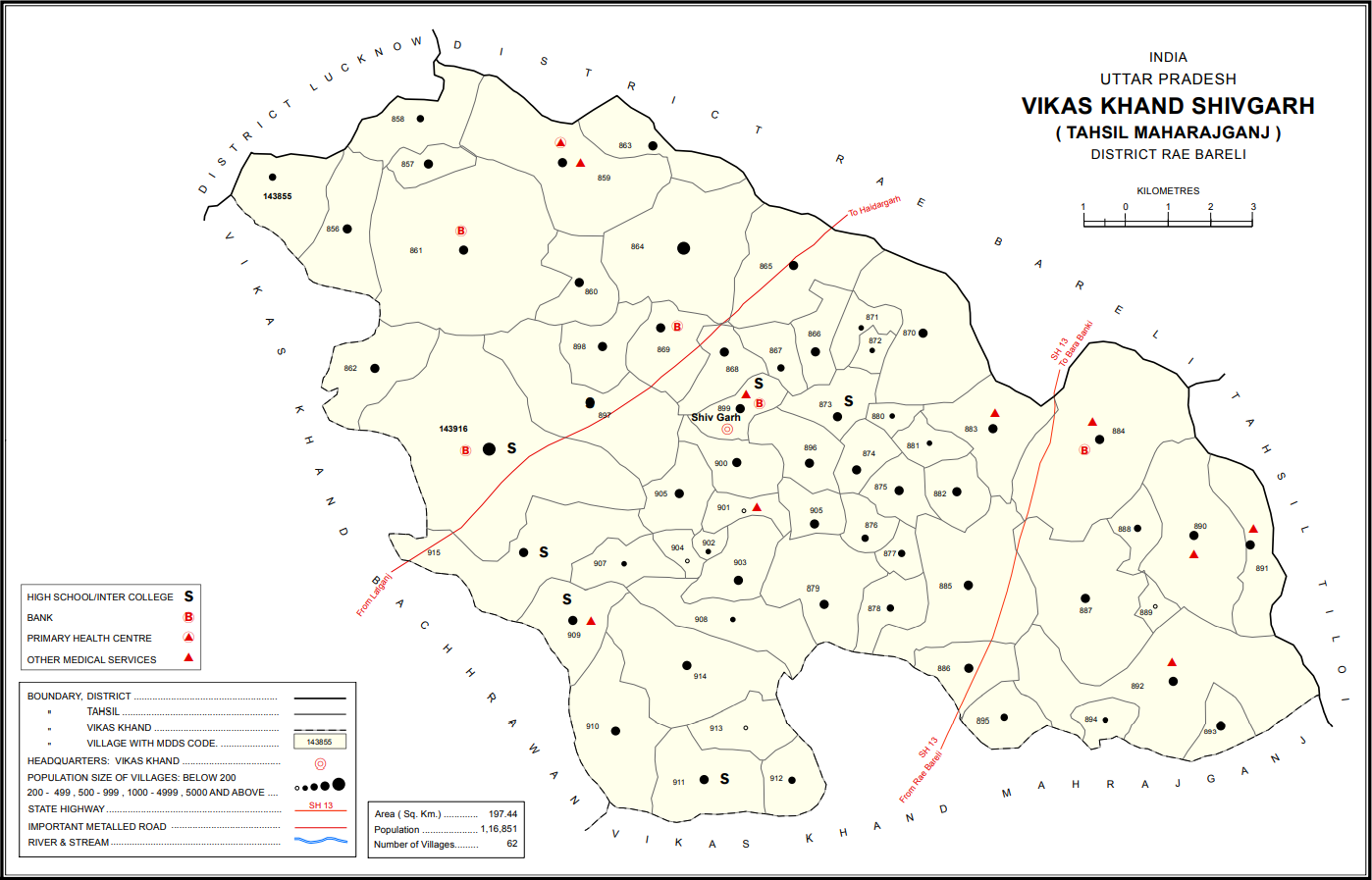
- Map showing Achhai (#890) in Shivgarh CD block

- Location in Uttar Pradesh, India
- Coordinates: 26.516002°N 81.342947°E
- Country India: India
- State: Uttar Pradesh
- District: Raebareli

Area
  - Total: 5.912 km^{2} (2.283 sq mi)

Population (2011)
  - Total: 2,652
  - Density: 448.6/km^{2} (1,162/sq mi)

Languages
  - Official: Hindi
- Time zone: UTC+5:30 (IST)
- Vehicle registration: UP-35

Achhai is a village in Shivgarh block of Rae Bareli district, Uttar Pradesh, India. As of 2011, its population is 2,652 people, in 537 households.

The 1961 census recorded Achhai as comprising 8 hamlets, with a total population of 1,292 people (632 male and 660 female), in 275 households and 263 physical houses. The area of the village was given as 1,546 acres.

The 1981 census recorded Achhai as having a population of 1,594 people, in 326 households, and having an area of 625.65 hectares.
