= Kasna =

- Village
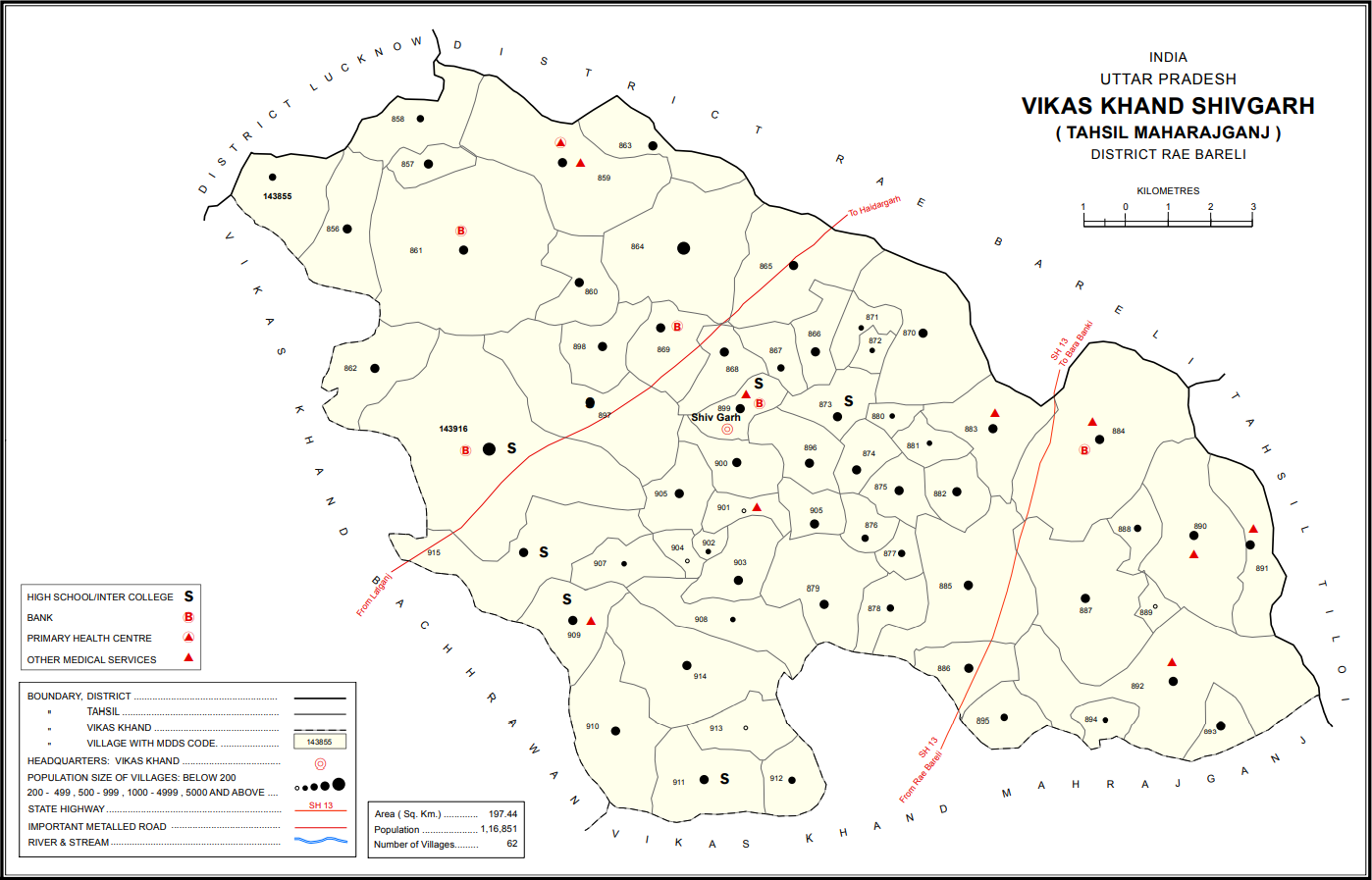
- Map showing Kasna (#875) in Shivgarh CD block

- Location in Uttar Pradesh, India
- Coordinates: 26.523587°N 81.280977°E
- Country India: India
- State: Uttar Pradesh
- District: Raebareli

Area
  - Total: 1.352 km^{2} (0.522 sq mi)

Population (2011)
  - Total: 1,191
  - Density: 880.9/km^{2} (2,282/sq mi)

Languages
  - Official: Hindi
- Time zone: UTC+5:30 (IST)
- Vehicle registration: UP-35

Kasna is a village in Shivgarh block of Rae Bareli district, Uttar Pradesh, India. As of 2011, its population is 1,191, in 222 households. It has one primary school and no healthcare facilities.

The 1961 census recorded Kasna as comprising 2 hamlets, with a total population of 574 people (307 male and 267 female), in 99 households and 87 physical houses. The area of the village was given as 336 acres.

The 1981 census recorded Pipri as having a population of 729 people, in 136 households, and having an area of 135.98 hectares.
