= Experiential interior design =

Interior design practice

Experiential interior design (EID) is the practice of employing experiential or phenomenological values in interior experience design. EID is a human-centered design approach to interior architecture based on modern environmental psychology emphasizing human experiential needs. The notion of EID emphasizes the influence of the designed environments on human total experiences including sensorial, cognitive, emotional, social, and behavioral experiences triggered by environmental cues. One of the key promises of EID is to offer values beyond the functional or mechanical experiences afforded by the environment.

== Definition ==
Cognitive scholars claim that the human mind has a modular structure (against one central processor) by which her evaluate and respond to environmental triggers. This evaluation of built environment leads to the a multifacet perception of that environment that renders Sensorial Experiences, Emotional Experiences, Intellectual Experiences, Pragmatic Experiences, and Social Experiences. These five categories collectively define the experiential values of the environment. Accordingly, EID can be defined as the process of understanding and embedding experiential values in interior design to engage users in a higher level of sensing, thinking, feeling, interacting, and/or doing.

== Outcomes ==
Experiential design can help to improve the user's evaluation and perception of an environment in different settings such as retail store. For example, three central feelings that can be targeted by EID include pleasure, arousal, and dominance. These feelings are the results of a well-designed environment by practicing EID. Pleasure refers to the degree of happiness, arousal to the degree of excitement, and dominance to the sense of control. These emotions lead to behavioral responses such as approach (vs avoidance). Approach behavior is a positive attitude toward a place, which results in intention to stay, explore, affiliate, or interact.

== In business literature ==
Business literature emphasizes the relationship between interior design and customer experience. For example, Schmitt's experiential marketing framework suggests that commercial environments should consider customers' experiential needs (functional, emotional, behavioral, social, and symbolic/lifestyle) in addition to sensorial experiences.

EID does not recommend a specific style of design, rather it emphasizes a design thinking process in which customers' experiential needs are prioritized. Marketing literature has demonstrated that experiential values can differentiate the offerings. EID helps firms providing symbolic meanings, differentiating brand, and communicating values with unique (branded) environmental experience. The values that associate with this positive experience enhance loyalty and fervent advocacy.
