= Shalimar Paints =

Paints manufacturing company in India

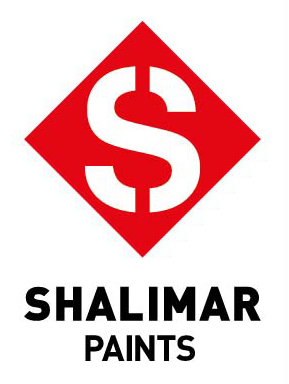
- Type: Public
- Traded as: BSE: 509874; NSE: SHALPAINTS
- Industry: Paint
- Founded: 1902
- Founder: AN Turner, AC Wright
- Headquarters: Gurugram, India
- Products: Paint
- Revenue: ▼₹5,690 million (US$59 million)
- Website: Official Website

Shalimar Paints BSE: 509874 is an Indian paints manufacturing company. The company engages in the manufacturing and marketing of decorative paints and industrial coatings. Some of India's buildings and structures such as the Howrah Bridge, Rashtrapati Bhawan, Salt Lake Stadium, All India Institute of Medical Sciences, and many others, continue to be painted with Shalimar Paints.

== History ==
Shalimar Paints was founded in 1902 by two British entrepreneurs AN Turner and AC Wright as Shalimar Paints Colour & Varnish Ltd. In the same year, the company set up a large scale manufacturing plant in Howrah, West Bengal, the first such plant in entire South East Asia. In 1928, Pinchin Johnson & Associates of UK bought control from the British entrepreneurs AN Turner and AC Wright. In 1963, the company's name was changed to Shalimar Paints Ltd after Turner Morisson & Co stepped in as new management.

With access to high-end technology, the company introduced many firsts in the industrial coatings segment such as high build zinc coatings, radiation resistant coatings for nuclear power plants, polyurethane paint for fighter aircraft and railway coaches, among others. Shalimar was the first company to paint a fighter aircraft for the Indian Army.

In a pivotal move in 1972, Shalimar transitioned into a public domain, marking a strategic milestone in its corporate history. Fast forward to 1989, the company underwent a noteworthy transformation through its acquisition by the influential O.P. Jindal Group in collaboration with the Hong Kong-based S.S. Jhunjhnuwala Group. This strategic partnership not only altered Shalimar's trajectory but also laid the foundation for dynamic developments and collective success.
